= Sandwip Upazila =

Upazila in Chattogram Division, Bangladesh

Sandwip সন্দ্বীপ
- Upazila
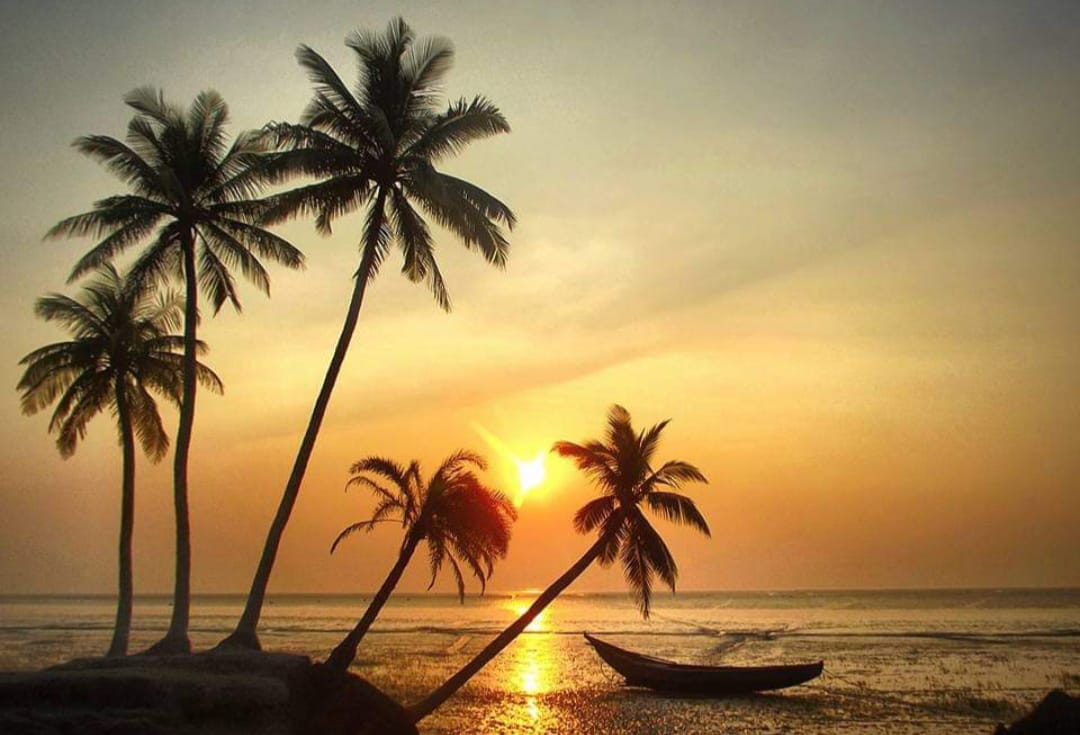
- Sunset of Sandwip island

- Coordinates: 22°29′N 91°26.5′E
- Country: Bangladesh
- Division: Chittagong
- District: Chittagong
- Jatiya Sangsad constituency: Chittagong-3
- Establishment: 1778; 248 years ago
- Upazila: 1984; 42 years ago
- Headquarters: Sandwip Upazila Complex

Government
  - Body: Upazila Council
  - MP: Mostafa Kamal Pasha
  - Chairman: Vacant
  - Chief Executive Officer: Reagan Chakma

Area
  - Total: 762.42 km^{2} (294.37 sq mi)

Population (2022)
  - Total: 327,564
  - Density: 429.64/km^{2} (1,112.8/sq mi)
- Demonym: Sandwippa
- Time zone: UTC+6 (BST)
- Postal code: 4300
- Area code: 03027
- Website: sandwip.gov.bd

Sandwip Upazila mauza geocode map

Sandwip (Bengali: সন্দ্বীপ) is an upazila of Chattogram District in Chattogram Division, Bangladesh. It encompasses the islands of Sandwip and Urir Char.

== History ==
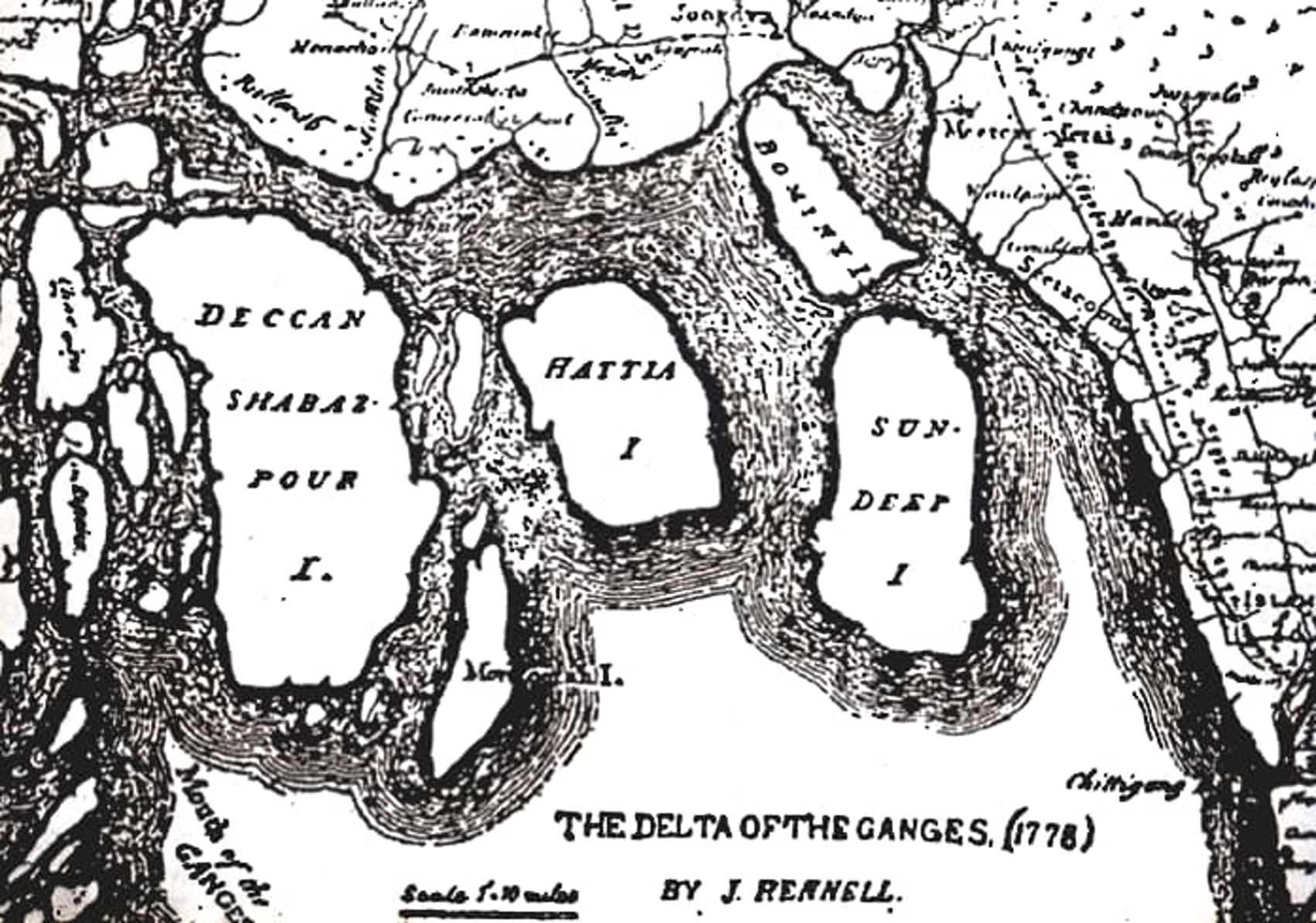
Sandwip in the map of delta of Ganges by surveyor James Rennell created in 1778

Sandwip Thana's status was upgraded to an upazila (sub-district level) in 1984. The construction works of a Bangladesh Navy fleet headquarters at the Sandwip Channel with ship berthing facilities is also going on as part of the Forces Goal 2030. In 2010, the Government of Bangladesh announced a plan to build a dam in Urir Char to reclaim land as it had suffered greatly from Tropical Storm One and the 1991 Bangladesh cyclone among other natural disasters.

== Geography ==
Sandwip is located at 22.4833°N 91.4417°E. It has a total area of 762.42 km^{2}.

== Demographics ==
Religions in Sandwip Upazila (2022)
Religion	Percent
Islam	91.90%
Hinduism	8.07%
Other or not stated	0.03%

According to the 2022 Bangladeshi census, Sandwip Upazila had 74,242 households and a population of 327,564. 10.67% of the population were under 5 years of age. Sandwip had a literacy rate (age 7 and over) of 74.14%: 74.64% for males and 73.69% for females, and a sex ratio of 90.94 males for every 100 females. 157,465 (48.07%) lived in urban areas.

As of the 2011 Census of Bangladesh, Sandwip upazila had 56,617 households and a population of 278,605. 71,657 (25.72%) were under 10 years of age. Sandwip had an average literacy rate of 51.47%, compared to the national average of 51.8%, and a sex ratio of 1166 females per 1000 males. 52,982 (19.02%) of the population lived in urban areas.

According to the 1991 Bangladesh census, Sandwip had a population of 272,179. Males constituted 49.68% of the population, and females 50.32%. The population aged 18 or over was 122,499. Sandwip had an average literacy rate of 35% (7+ years), against the national average of 32.4%.

== Administration ==
Sandwip Upazila is divided into the Sandwip Municipality and 15 union parishads: Amanullah, Azimpur, Bauria, Digghapar, Gachhua, Haramia, Harispur, Kalapania, Magdhara, Maitbhanga, Musapur, Rahmatpur, Santoshpur, Sarikait, and Urirchar. The union parishads are subdivided into 39 mouzas and 34 villages.

Sandwip Municipality is subdivided into 9 wards and 10 mahallas.

=== List of chairmen and rulers ===
List of chairmen
Name	Notes
Muhammad Rafiqullah Chowdhury	1985–1990
Mostafa Kamal Pasha	1990–1995
Master Shahjahan BA	2009–2023
Main Uddin Mission	2023–2024
SM Anwar Hossain	May 2024– Aug 2024

== Education ==
There are 28 secondary schools in Sandwip Upazila, including

- Kargil Government High School, the oldest school in the Upazila founded in 1879
- Gachua Adarsha High School, established in 1987
- Bauria Golam Khalek Academy

In total, the Upazila has 149 state primary schools, one junior high school, 4 colleges, 1 girls college, 19 kindergartens and 3 girls high schools. There are 9 dakhil madrasas, 3 alim madrasas, 3 fazil madrasas and four Kamil madrasas. Notable madrasas include the Bashiria Ahmadia Alhaj Abu Bakar Sidiqque Fazil Madrasa, founded in 1902, and the Kashgar Islamia Fazil Madrasa which was founded in 1929. The upazila has a literacy rate of 51.5%.

== Facilities ==
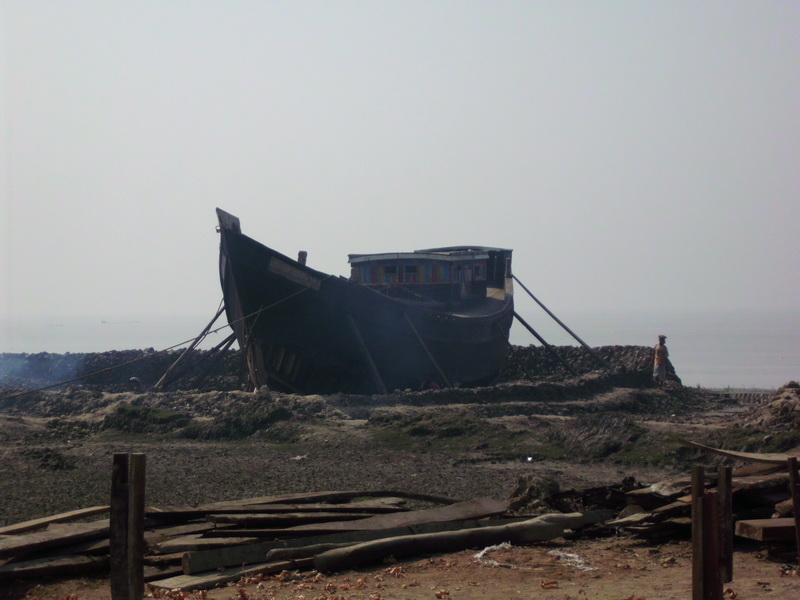
Small ship building yard at the coastal area.

The upazila is home to 10 orphanages, including one governmental orphanage. It has 295 mosques which serve the majority Sunni Muslim population of the sub-district. Notable mosques include Shahabanu Mosque, Faqir Shah Mosque, Sandwip Town Jame Mosque, Sandwip Town Bazar Mosque, and the Abdul Ghani Chowdhury Mosque. There are 32 haat bazaars, two canals, 26 post offices, and 10 banks.

== Notable people ==
- Chowdhury Abu Torab Khan, leader of Bengal's first anti-British uprising
- Abul Kashem Sandwip, educationist and a founder of Bangladesh Betar
- Abdul Hakim, 17th-century poet
- Wali Gandhi (1907-1978), journalist, writer, and political activist
- Abul Fazal Ziaur Rahman, physician and army officer
- AKM Asadul Haq, physician and army officer
- AKM Rafiq Ullah Choudhury, politician and language activist
- Alhaz Mustafizur Rahman, politician
- Belal Muhammad, a founder of Swadhin Bangla Betar Kendra
- Belayet Hossain, Bangladeshi freedom fighter
- Chowdhury Hasan Sarwardy, former lieutenant general of the Bangladesh Army
- Dilal Khan, final independent ruler of Sandwip
- Mahfuzur Rahaman, politician
- M. Obaidul Huq, politician
- Mostafa Kamal Pasha, politician
- Muzaffar Ahmad, politician and journalist
- Mohammed Didarul Alam
- Shamsuddin Qasemi, Islamic scholar and politician
- Lalmohan Sen, revolutionary involved in the Chittagong armoury raid
- Mohit Kamal, psychotherapist
- Muhammad Fouzul Kabir Khan, adviser of the interim government of Bangladesh
- Khaled Belal, writer and journalist.
- Saeed Ahmad Sandwipi, Hadith scholar

== See also ==
- Upazilas of Bangladesh
- Districts of Bangladesh
- Divisions of Bangladesh
