= Magdhara Union =

Mogdhora Union মগধরা
- Union
- Mogdhora Union
- Location in Bangladesh
- Coordinates: 22°30′N 91°31′E
- Country: Bangladesh
- Division: Chattogram Division
- District: Chattogram District
- Upazila: Sandwip Upazila

Area
  - Total: 156.18 km^{2} (60.30 sq mi)

Population (2011)
  - Total: 37,988
  - Density: 243.23/km^{2} (629.97/sq mi)
- Website: magdharaup.chittagong.gov.bd

Mogdhora Union (Bengali: মগধরা) or Magdhara Union is a union parishad located in Sandwip Upazila, within the Chattogram District of Bangladesh. It covers an area of 156.18 square kilometres (60.30 sq mi) and had a population of 37,988 according to the 2011 census.

== Etymology ==
According to historian Syed Murtaza Ali, the locality was named after Raja Dilal's victory over the Mag forces of the Kingdom of Arakan at this place. The term Mag referred to the Arakanese people and, in this historical context, specifically denoted Arakanese raiders who conducted raids along the coastal regions of Bengal.

== History ==
Magdhara is situated on Sandwip, an island in the Meghna estuary in southeastern Bangladesh. During the 16th and 17th centuries, Sandwip was strategically important because of its location along regional maritime trade routes. The island was contested by Mughal authorities, the rulers of Arakan, and Portuguese maritime groups.

During the 17th century, Dilal Khan, also known as Dilal Raja, established an independent or semi-independent rule over Sandwip. According to accounts, he maintained his authority amid political and military competition involving the Mughal Empire and the Kingdom of Arakan. The name of Magdhara has been associated with Dilal Raja's reported victory over Arakanese Magh forces.
