= List of schools in Sandwip =

There are 28 secondary schools in Sandwip, Chittagong District, in the Chittagong Division of Bangladesh.

The secondary schools are:

Name	Educational Institute Identification Number (EIIN)	Headmaster
A.K. Academy Gasua High School	104954	Aminur Rasul Zahir
Abeda Foyez Girls' High School	104963	Dulal Chandra Majumdar
Ayesha Obayed Girls' High School	104940	Md. Didarul Alam
Azimpur High School	104952	Binchapad Roy
Bauria Golam Khalek Academy	104961	Nur Chapa
Dwip Bondhu Mostafizur Rahman High School	104958	MD. Abul Kashem Mollah
East Sandwip Enam Nahar Girls' High School	104951	Tahura Begum
East Sandwip High School	104944	MD. Abdul Mannan
Gachua Adarsha High School	104953	Delwar Hossain
Jeben Nur Sultana High School	104950	Gouranga Chandra Nandi
Kalapania Chowdhury Biddah Nikaton	104967	MD. Saiful Islam Azad
Kalapania High School	104959	MD. Abdul Mannan
Kargil Government High School	104945	MD. Saiful Islam
Katgar Golam Nabi High School	104942	MD. Jashim Uddin
Kazi Afaz Uddin Adarsha High School	104966	MD. Abdul Hannan
Magdhara High School	104948	MD. Baten
Maitbhanga High School	104946	MD. Rafiqul Mowla
Modhya Santospur High School	104947	MD. Jamshedur Rahman
Momena Sekander Govt. Girls' High School	104956	MD. Sirajul Islam
Musapur Bodiuzzaman High School	104962	Md. Anowarul Kabir
Musapur Hajee Abdul Baten High School	104949	MD. Samsul Alam
Rahamatpur High School	104943	MD. Majaharul Islam
Sandwip Ideal High School	104964	MD. Sirajul Islam
Sandwip Model High School	104941	MD. Sharafat Ullah
Sandwip Public High School	104957	Md. Mossadequl Mowla
Santospur High School	104960	MD. Selim Akter
South East Sandwip High School	104965	MD. Aktar Hossain
South Sandwip High School	104955	MD. Abdullah (Acting Head Teacher)

== See also ==
- Education in Bangladesh
- List of schools in Bangladesh
