= Syed Abdul Majid (politician) =

Bengali politician

Advocate Syed Abdul Majid
- সৈয়দ আব্দুল মজীদ

Member of the Bengal Legislative Assembly
- In office 1937–1945
- Succeeded by: Maulana Abdul Hai
- Constituency: Noakhali South

Personal details
- Born: 1893 Sandwip, Noakhali District, Bengal Presidency
- Died: August 25, 1955 (aged 61–62)
- Party: All-India Muslim League
- Education: University of Calcutta; Ripon College

Syed Abdul Majid Wakil (Bengali: সৈয়দ আব্দুল মজীদ উকিল) was a Bengali politician and lawyer.

== Early life and education ==
Abdul Majid was born in 1893 to a Bengali family of Sayyids from the village of Katgarh in Amanullah, located in the island of Sandwip (then under the jurisdiction of the Noakhali District of the Bengal Presidency). He completed his matriculation from the Kargil High School in 1912. Abdul Majid then completed a Bachelor of Arts from the University of Calcutta in 1919. From 1925 to 1926, he served as the general secretary of the Calcutta-based Noakhali Association. Abdul Majid proceeded to complete a Bachelor of Laws from Ripon College, Calcutta, graduating in 1928. He was the fourth graduate in the Muslim community of Sandwip.

== Career ==
Abdul Majid began his career as a lawyer at the Noakhali Bar and was briefly a member of the Dacca University Court. He was elected as a member of the Noakhali District Board as a representative of Sandwip in 1923 and 1924. Abdul Majid was also elected a member of the local board in 1927. In 1944, he was elected chairman of the Noakhali District Board defeating Minister Khan Bahadur Abdul Ghufran, making him the first ever Sandwipi to serve as chairman of Noakhali District Board. As the chairman for 11 consecutive years, he established many hospitals, roads, bridges, schools, and furqania madrasas throughout the district.

Following the 1937 Bengal Legislative Assembly election, he was elected as a member of the Bengal Legislative Assembly for the Noakhali South constituency (consisting of Sandwip Island and Hatia Island). He had represented the All-India Muslim League, defeating his closest rival Zamindar Faizullah Mahdi Chowdhury of Chittagong. Incidentally, voters in the elections were those who paid a minimum of six annas of Chowkidari tax to the local Union Board. Abdul Majid used to go out on election campaigns on market days in a bullock cart. He used to give long speeches in unscheduled meetings held in the market. There was no president in those meetings, no second speaker, no announcements made before the meeting. His election budget in the elections was two thousand taka and he was five feet tall.

In 1940, he was appointed the director of Sandwip Central Bank. Abdul Majid was appointed as a parliamentary secretary in 1943 during the leadership of Prime Minister Khwaja Nazimuddin. He contested in the 1946 Bengal Legislative Assembly election losing to Maulana Abdul Hai. For many years, he was the president of the Noakhali District School Board, the Noakhali District Muslim League and the Bar Association, and the secretary of Uma Girls High School. After the Partition of Bengal (1947), he was a long-serving member of the All-Pakistan Muslim League's working committee and councillor. During the tenure of Liaquat Ali Khan as General Secretary of the Central Muslim League, he served as a member of the Muslim League's executive committee, a councilor of the All India Muslim League, and the president of the Greater Noakhali District Muslim League. He also served as the president of the Noakhali District Bar Association. He also contested as a Muslim League candidate in the 1954 East Bengal Legislative Assembly election, losing to United Front candidate Advocate Mozammel Hussain.

== Death ==
Abdul Majid died on 25 August 1955.
