= Hatiya Island =

Island in Bangladesh

Coordinates: 22°40′N 91°00′E

Hatiya
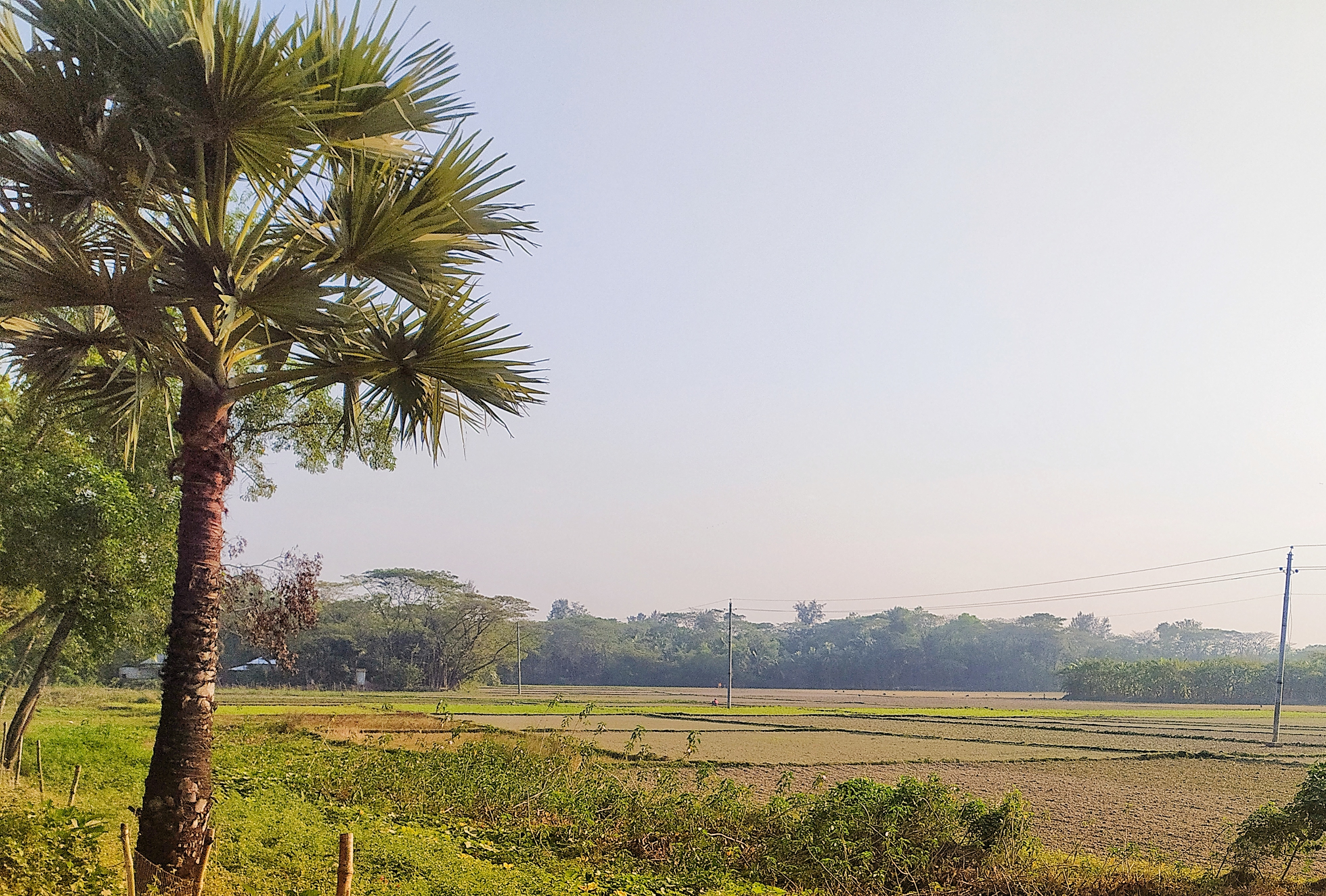
- Fields on Hatiya island

- Location within Chittagong division Location within Bangladesh

Geography
- Adjacent to: Bay of Bengal
- Area: 480 km^{2} (190 sq mi)

Administration
- Bangladesh
- Division: Chittagong
- District: Noakhali
- Upazila: Hatiya

Hatiya Island is an island in the northern Bay of Bengal, Bangladesh, at the mouth of the Meghna river. The island falls under Hatiya Upazila of Noakhali District. The island has an area of 480 km^{2}. Other major offshore islands of this region are Bhola Island (which is the largest) and Manpura Island. All of these islands are densely populated. It is frequently subject to cyclones and destructive ocean waves.

== Geography ==
There are no traces of 100–150 years old left in Hatiya due to the erosion of nature in the face of the heavy flooding of the Meghna and the huge body of water in the Bay of Bengal. Researchers like Suresh Chandra Dutta mentions that every 138 to 140 years, one mile of landmass is created in Hatiya. Taking into account this information, the island's age is estimated to be 5,000 to 6,000 years. At one time the distance with Sandwip was very short. But gradually that distance has now exceeded 60 miles. Constant erosion has created this distance. The game of breaking tools is swinging in a four-way swing. Breaking north, east and west. It is forming in the south again, as well as various types of small and big chars are rising around the mainland. According to a report by an organization called Web Star, the erosion of the northern part of the original territory of Hatiyar began in 1890. Although large tracts of land have been wiped out by river and sea erosion, at the same time the tool size in the north of the island has begun to increase at a rate of about 2 to 5 times the rate of erosion. At that time, the number of chars in the area was as follows: 5 at the mouth of Feni river, 16 at Hatia Island, 5 at Hatia Channel, 3 at the mouth of Meghna and 35 at the mouth of Dakatia river. In the span of 120 years, a lot has changed in accounting. Many chars have been connected to the mainland, some have been lost to erosion. Although it is difficult to determine the exact size due to continuous demolition, according to the estimates of the Upazila Parishad, the current area of the tool is mentioned as 2100 km^{2}.

=== Climate ===
Climate data for Hatiya (1991–2020, extremes 1965-present)
Month	Jan	Feb	Mar	Apr	May	Jun	Jul	Aug	Sep	Oct	Nov	Dec	Year
Record high °C (°F)	30.3 (86.5)	33.5 (92.3)	37.8 (100.0)	39.4 (102.9)	39.7 (103.5)	37.7 (99.9)	36.2 (97.2)	36.0 (96.8)	36.0 (96.8)	37.9 (100.2)	34.4 (93.9)	31.5 (88.7)	39.7 (103.5)
Mean daily maximum °C (°F)	25.5 (77.9)	28.4 (83.1)	31.3 (88.3)	32.4 (90.3)	32.4 (90.3)	31.2 (88.2)	30.3 (86.5)	30.7 (87.3)	31.2 (88.2)	31.3 (88.3)	29.6 (85.3)	26.5 (79.7)	30.1 (86.2)
Daily mean °C (°F)	18.7 (65.7)	21.9 (71.4)	25.8 (78.4)	28.0 (82.4)	28.8 (83.8)	28.6 (83.5)	28.0 (82.4)	28.1 (82.6)	28.2 (82.8)	27.5 (81.5)	24.2 (75.6)	20.2 (68.4)	25.7 (78.3)
Mean daily minimum °C (°F)	13.5 (56.3)	16.4 (61.5)	20.8 (69.4)	24.0 (75.2)	25.1 (77.2)	25.9 (78.6)	25.7 (78.3)	25.7 (78.3)	25.6 (78.1)	24.4 (75.9)	19.8 (67.6)	15.5 (59.9)	21.9 (71.4)
Record low °C (°F)	6.5 (43.7)	9.8 (49.6)	12.5 (54.5)	18.0 (64.4)	18.8 (65.8)	21.5 (70.7)	22.0 (71.6)	21.3 (70.3)	22.0 (71.6)	19.2 (66.6)	13.4 (56.1)	9.9 (49.8)	6.5 (43.7)
Average precipitation mm (inches)	6 (0.2)	18 (0.7)	37 (1.5)	108 (4.3)	313 (12.3)	644 (25.4)	795 (31.3)	575 (22.6)	455 (17.9)	324 (12.8)	47 (1.9)	10 (0.4)	3,332 (131.2)
Average precipitation days (≥ 1 mm)	1	2	2	6	13	21	25	23	19	11	2	1	126
Average relative humidity (%)	76	74	76	79	82	87	89	88	86	84	80	79	82
Mean monthly sunshine hours	226.5	226.7	241.0	232.4	205.4	149.5	143.8	154.5	167.2	220.6	241.7	224.3	2,433.6
Source 1: NOAA
Source 2: Bangladesh Meteorological Department (humidity 1981-2010)

== History ==
Various organisations in Hatiya have published works relating to its medieval history. Along with native elders, Muhammad Amin, the former magistrate of Hatiya Upazila and author of Tilottama Hatia: History and Tradition asserts that the island came to be greatly populated only after the arrival of Muslim traders from Baghdad travelling towards Chittagong. A ninth-century mosque can be found in Hatiya, which is considered the island's first Jame masjid. Preachers such as Sultan Balkhi, Shah Ali Baghdadi and Bayazid Bastami were also rumoured to have visited the island. The Kirats of the island accepted Islam through the invitation of the Arab merchants.

During Bengal's Baro-Bhuiyan period, Hatia was ruled by Kandarpanarayana Rai, the Hindu chief of Bakla. The eighteenth century marked the time in which Hatiya Island was under the hegemony of Chowdhury Abu Torab Khan, a powerful zamindar who led the first rebellion against the British East India Company in Bengal. In 1702, the Hatiya's first Jame mosque sank into the riverbed. On 29 March 1822, Governor-General Francis Rawdon-Hastings incorporated Hatia into the District of Bhulua. Abdul Majid, an engineer from Dhaka, had a mosque built in 1958 on the site of Hatiya's first Jame Mosque. He preserved the former mosque's architectural style, but this second mosque lasted only until 1983.

In 2015, the government of Bangladesh decided to relocate some Rohingyas to Hatiya Island.

== Culture ==
Abdullah Al Mamun's last film Doriya Parer Doulati ("Wealth from the Sea") is based on life in Hatia Island.
