= Gachua Union =

Place in Chittagong District, Sandwip Upazila

Gachua গাছুয়া
- Union Council
- No.3 Gachua Union Parishad
- Location in Bangladesh
- Coordinates: 22°33.5′N 91°29′E
- Country: Bangladesh
- Division: Chittagong Division
- District: Chittagong District
- Upazila: Sandwip Upazila
- Jatiya Sangsad constituency: Chittagong-3
- Formed: 1988; 38 years ago

Government
  - Body: Union Council
  - Chairman: Mohammad Shamsuddin

Area
  - Total: 14.60 km^{2} (5.64 sq mi)

Population (2011)
  - Total: 17,078
  - Density: 1,170/km^{2} (3,030/sq mi)
- Time zone: UTC+6 (BST)
- Postal code: 4300
- Website: gachhuaup.gov.bd

Gachua (Bengali: গাছুয়া) is a union in Sandwip upazila of Chittagong district in Bangladesh.

== Geography ==
Location of Gachua Union is in the northern part of Sandwip upazila. The distance of this union from Upazila Sadar is about 10 kilometers. Santoshpur Union is in the north of this union, Amanullah Union and Kalapania Union is in the west. It is bounded on the south by Bauria Union and on the east by Sandwip Channel, Syedpur Union and Muradpur Union of Sitakunda Upazila.

The area of Gachua Union is 3463 acres (14.08 km^{2}) as of the census of 2006.

Sandwip Channel is located on the east side of Gachua Union. There are also many small canals.

== Population ==
According to the 2011 census, the population of Gachua Union is 16,078. Of these, 7,128 are males and 8,950 are females.

== Administrative structure ==
Gachua Union is No. 3 Union Parishad under Sandwip Upazila. It is part of Jatiya Sangsad Constituency No. 270 Chittagong-3. Administrative activities of the union are under Sandwip police station. It is divided into 3 mouzas.

The villages of this union are:

- Hadia Para
- Mohammadpur Para
- Latif Bhuiyan Para
- Dhaner and Abur Go Para
- Saudar Go Para
- Chobi Rahman Para
- Roushan Ali Para
- Bereer Par Para

== Education system ==
Gachua Union has an average literacy rate of 48.63%. The union has 1 Fazil Madrasa, 3 secondary schools, 11 primary schools and 9 Ananda schools.

== Educational institutions ==
Madrashas

- Katgarh Islamia Fazil Madrasa

Secondary schools

- Abdul Khaleq Academy High School
- Gachua Adarsh High School

Primary schools

- North Azimpur Government Primary School
- Kashem Market Government Primary School
- Gachua AK Government Primary School
- Gachua Ghatmajhir Hat Government Primary School
- Gachua South-West Government Primary School
- Gachua South-East Government Primary School
- Gachua Madhyapara Government Primary School
- Char Hudrakhali Government Primary School
- Dadan Shaheed Belayet Bir Uttam Government Primary School
- Sandwip Gachua Banglabazar Government Primary School
- Sandwip Gachua Scouts Government Primary School

== Communication system ==
The main road from Upazila Sadar to Gachua Union is the Sandwip-Gachua road. There is also Sarikait-Santoshpur road. Means of communication are taxi, motorcycle, rickshaw, bicycle.

== Local markets ==
The main market of Gachua Union are Ghatmajhir Hat, Akbar Hat, Haq Saheb Bazar, Bangla Bazar, Kashem Market and Banir Hat and some part of Ershad Market.

== Illustrious personalities ==
- M Obaidul Haque –– The first Member of Parliament for Sandwip.
- Belayet Hossain –– A heroic freedom fighter with the title of Bir Uttam.
- Master Shafiqul Alam –– Bir Muktijoddha and former chairman.

== Public representative ==
- Current Chairman: Mohammad Shamsuddin

List of chairmen

Sr. No.	Chairman's name	Duration
01	Haji Abdus Sattar	
02	Master Shafiqul Haque	1983-2003
03	Mohammad Walidur Rahman	2003-2011
04	Mohammad Shamsuddin	2011–present
