= Bhasan Char =

Island in Sandwip Upazila, Bangladesh

Bhasan Char Char Bhasani
Native name: ভাসানচর
- Location within Bangladesh

Geography
- Location: Bay of Bengal
- Coordinates: 22°22′30″N 91°23′33″E
- Area: 25 sq mi (65 km^{2})

Administration
- Bangladesh
- Division: Chittagong Division
- District: Chittagong District
- Upazila: Sandwip Upazila

Demographics
- Population: 35,629 (September 2024)
- Ethnic groups: Rohingya (majority)

Additional information
- Time zone: BST (UTC+6)

Bhasan Char (Bengali: ভাসান চর), also known as Char Bhasani (Bengali: চর ভাসানী), is an island in Sandwip Upazila, Chittagong District, Bangladesh. Historically administered under Hatiya Upazila of Noakhali District, the island was officially declared part of Sandwip Upazila in 17 January 2026 following the resolution of a long-standing boundary dispute. Nayamasti Union of Sandwip Upazila was gradually lost due to severe river erosion. Large areas of the union were washed away by the strong currents of the Meghna River, and the eroded soil and sediment were later deposited downstream. Over time, this deposited material accumulated in the estuarine zone and eventually formed a new char, which is now known as Bhasan Char.

Until 2019 it was known as Thengar Char. It is located in the Bay of Bengal, about 6 kilometres (3.7 mi) from Sandwip island and 37 miles (60 km) from the mainland.

== Etymology ==
A char is an island formed by the continuous shifting of a river. Bhasan stands for "floating".

== History ==
The island was formed by Himalayan silt in the Bay of Bengal. While earlier reports suggested it surfaced in 2006, local residents and Forest Department records indicate that land began re-emerging in the 1990s, shortly after the Nayamasti Union of Sandwip completely disappeared into the sea due to erosion in 1992. It spans 40 square kilometres (15 sq mi; 4,000 ha).

=== Administrative dispute and resolution ===
For several years, the island was the subject of a boundary dispute between the residents of Sandwip Upazila (Chittagong District) and Hatiya Upazila (Noakhali District). In 2017, the government issued a gazette placing the island under Hatiya, followed by another notification in 2021 establishing a "Bhasan Char Police Station" under Noakhali jurisdiction. These decisions sparked protests from the residents of Sandwip, who claimed the land was the re-emerged territory of their lost Nayamasti Union.

In January 2026, the Ministry of Land officially resolved the dispute by declaring that the six mouzas of Bhasan Char belong to Sandwip. This decision was based on a report by a technical committee formed by the Chittagong Divisional Commissioner, which analyzed on-spot inspections, historical documents, and satellite images to confirm the island's geographical and historical link to Sandwip.

=== Rohingya relocation ===
In 2015, the government of Bangladesh planned to construct a total of 1,440 buildings, including 120 cyclone shelters, to relocate 100,000 Rohingya refugees from the mainland camps of Cox's Bazar. The proposal was characterized by the United Nations Refugee Agency as "logistically challenging". On January 26, 2017, the Bangladeshi government ordered their resettlement nonetheless. Human Rights Watch called it "a human rights and humanitarian disaster in the making".

In August 2019 the government announced an expansion of the Ashrayan Project (Ashrayan-3) to build 100,000 homes, despite opposition from Rohingya leaders and human rights groups.

A United Nations delegation visited the island for the first time in March 2021. The UN Refugee Agency has signed a memorandum in helping the refugees here. The Rohingya were permitted work and contribute to the economy, but may not move off the island. In principle, the island was seen as a temporary solution until the refugees could return home. Until May 2022, the government has relocated approximately 28,000 Rohingya refugees to Bhasan Char.

== Population ==
As of 30 September 2024, 35,629 people, including 8,477 families live in the island.

== Geography ==
Bhasan Char lies to the immediate southwest of Sandwip. It is a low-lying island formed from silt deposits, and is only accessible by boat and helicopter. As the island’s coastline is constantly shifting due to its newness and its position in the Ganges Delta, the refugee camp is protected by a system of levees. It is vulnerable to the area’s frequent tropical cyclones.

Rohingya refugees arriving at Bhasan Char on 3 March 2021.

== See also ==
- List of islands of Bangladesh
