= Gokul Ghoshal =

Native official of East India Company

Gokul Chandra Ghoshal was a native official of the East India Company who became a prominent and influential landlord by abusing his position and founded the Bhukailash Estate. He and Devi Singh, Diwan of Rangpur, were part of a number of rent collectors of the East India Company who became notorious for their corruption. Ghoshal had become wealthy and powerful through using his link to the East India Company.

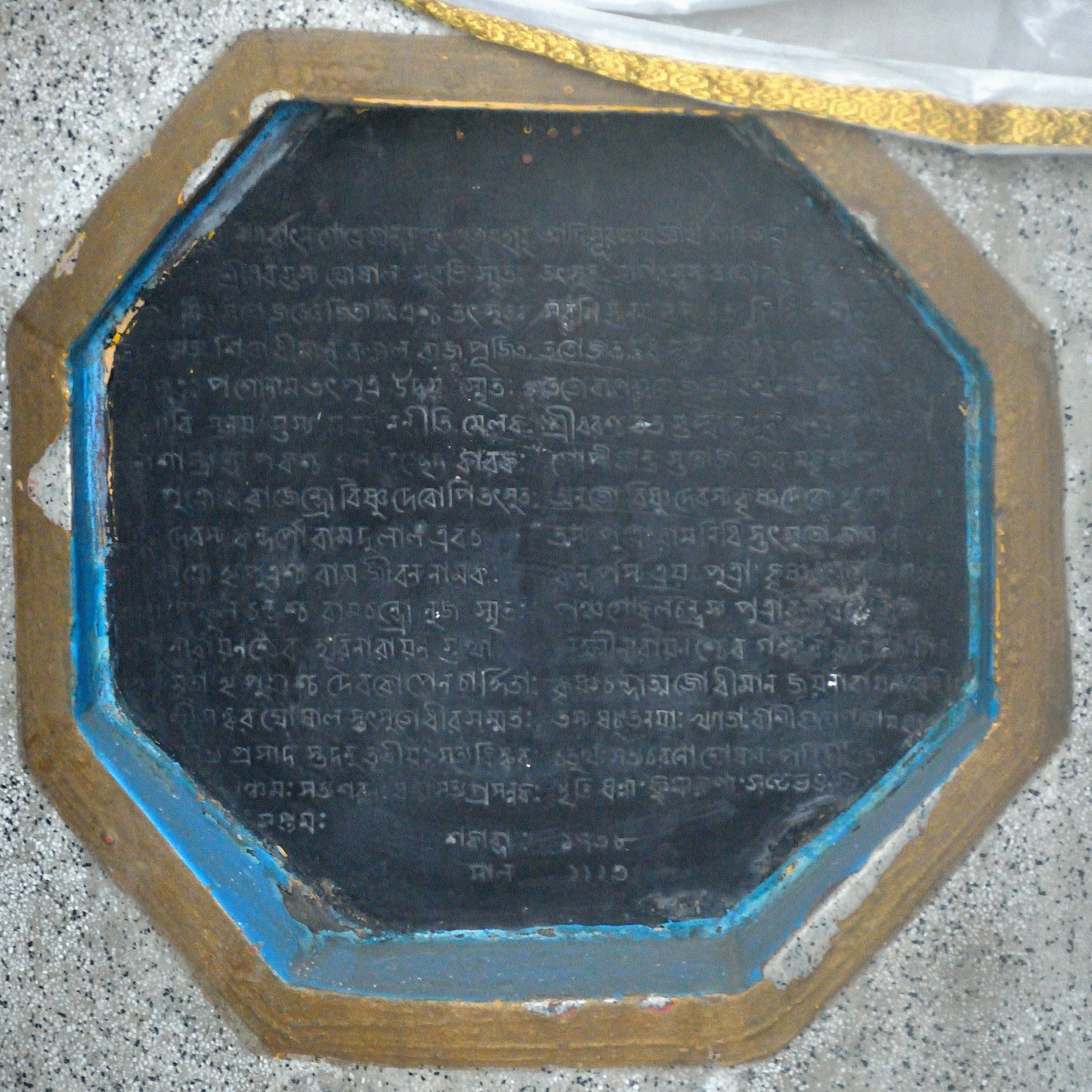
Jaynarain Ghoshal Memorial Plaque at the Joynarain Ghoshal Mausoleum in the Bhukailash Rajbati Estate, Kidderpore, Kolkata.

== Career ==
From 1761 to 1764, Ghoshal was the diwan of Chittagong under the East India Company. He also worked as a salt merchant. He was able to build a significant fortune by abusing the power of his office. He served as the banian (agent) to the Governor of Chittagong (future Governor of Bengal), Harry Verelst. His brother was Maharaja Krishna Chandra Ghoshal. He briefly served as the diwan of 24 Parganas.

Ghoshal was later given the task to revise the land settlement for revenue collection of the Sandwip Island. He dispossessed a number of local zamindars and seized their land for himself. He also secured significant land for his nephew, Joynarain Ghoshal. He had all reclaimed land, known as Noabad Estate, would belong to his nephew, Joynarain Ghoshal, and that he had a written permission for it from Harry Verelst. He also claimed that zamindars and talukdars operating Noabad Estates in Chittagong would need permission from Joynarain. This was immediately challenged by the affected zamindars and talukdars and violence followed. The Chittagong Council declared the written permission a forgery and as such the order illegal in 1797. The land claimed until the cancellation would remain part of the estate of Joynarain.

Ghoshal used a similar forgery order to try to take a portion of a zamidari estate in Rajshahi. He also faced accusations of obstruction from Luis Da Costa, a Portuguese mediator settled in Bengal. He had built a mansion in Kidderpore of Kolkata. He also ran into conflicts with Chowdhury Abu Torab Khan, a zamindar of Sandwip, over revenue collection. This would eventually led a rebellion in Sandwhip against the company and their agents.

When the zamindar of Selimabad in Bakerganj (presently Barisal Division) asked for the administration's help in protecting his land from invasion by an adventurer, Ghoshal was sent. He protected the estate but in payment took half of it. His descendant, Kali Sankar Ghoshal, became a raja through the purchase of bonds of the East India Company and would build a place in Jhalokati District on the land acquired by Ghosal from the zamindar of Selimabad.
