= Kargil Government High School =

- কার্গিল সরকারি উচ্চ বিদ্যালয়

Location
- Haramia, Sandwip; Chittagong District; 4300; Bangladesh; 22.5003°N 91.4560°E

Information
- Type: Secondary School
- Established: 1902
- Founder: Mr. J. D. Kargil
- School board: Chittagong Education Board
- School number: 104945
- School code: 3325
- Headmaster: Md. Saiful Islam
- Grades: Sixth-SSC
- Gender: Co-educational
- Language: Bengali
- Campus: Rural
- Campus size: 1.15 Acres

Kargil Government High School (Bengali: কার্গিল সরকারি উচ্চ বিদ্যালয়) is a secondary school situated at Sandwip in Chittagong District, Bangladesh. It is the first and the oldest school of Sandwip. It is a 6th grade to SSC-level educational institution.

== History ==
A Minor School was started with 12 students at old Sandwip town by distinguished persons on 12 April 1879. Within short time this school was changed to middle English school. Mr. J. D. Kargil, then magistrate of Noakhali visited Sandwip on behalf of the government in December 1901. To expand higher education in Sandwip, he promoted the Middle English school as a secondary school. Mr. Kargil established the foundation of the school on 2 February 1902. The school was named after Mr. Kargil.

Shree Shachindra Guha was the first headmaster of the school. Calcutta University allowed the students of the school to attend the entrance examination. Calcutta University granted this institution permanently on 28 July 1908 and this exits till now. The school area was affected by the cyclone of 1960 and the school building was destroyed. Azam Khan, the then governor of East Pakistan, visited the school and seeing the destruction he assured the reconstruction of the school building. In 1984, H M Ershad, the then president of Bangladesh, visited Sandwip while the school was seeking for nationalization. He granted the school for nationalization. The school area was destroyed by the erosion of the Meghna in 1994 and went under the river water. Then the institution was transferred to Haramia.

== See also ==
- Gachua Adarsha High School
- List of schools in Sandwip
