= Urir Char =

Union Council in Chattogram Division, Bangladesh

Urirchar উড়িরচর
- Union Council
- No. 1 Urirchar Union Parishad
- Location in Bangladesh
- Coordinates: 22°41′34″N 91°20′18″E
- Country: Bangladesh
- Division: Chittagong Division
- District: Chattogram District
- Upazila: Sandwip Upazila
- Jatiya Sangsad constituency: Chittagong-3
- Discovered: 1970-1971
- Union: 1988
- Founder: Sandwip locals
- Named for: Uri grass

Government
  - Body: Union Council
  - Chairman: Muhammad Abdur Rahim
  - Secretary: Qadi Muhammad Mehrajul Islam

Area
  - Total: 105.23 km^{2} (40.63 sq mi)

Population
  - Total: 13,323
  - Density: 126.61/km^{2} (327.91/sq mi)
- Time zone: UTC+6 (BST)
- Postal code: 4302
- Website: Urircharup.gov.bd

Urir Char island, Bangladesh

Urir Char (Bengali: উড়িরচর) is an inhabited island in the Bay of Bengal. It is also a union parishad of Sandwip Upazila under Chattogram District in Chattogram Division, Bangladesh.

== Geography ==
This river island is located north of Sandwip, and is surrounded by the Sandwip Channel in all directions and the Bay of Bengal southwards. To the island's south is Santoshpur Union, to its east is Mirsharai Upazila, to its north is the Musapur Union and finally to its west is Char Elahi and Char Clerk.

== History ==
Around 1970/1971, an island emerged just northwest of Sandwip near the Meghna Estuary. A few days after its emergence, Sandwip's residents began to explore the new island and found that there was a type of grass colloquially known as Uri in abundance across the island. Due to this, the island became known as Urir Char (Bengali: উড়ির চর) which means the river island of Uri. During this time, Asadul Haq Chowdhury (Prakash Saheb Miah) was the Chairman of Sandwip Upazila's Kalapania Union Parishad. Through his initiative, some landless people of Sandwip (whose homes had been lost due to diluvium) were relocated to Urirchar between 1980 and 1981.

In 1985, Urir Char was among a number of islands in the Bay of Bengal that were devastated by Tropical Storm One. The Bangladesh Army flew relief materials in by helicopter. Urirchar also faced many other natural disasters after this such as the 1991 Bangladesh cyclone, 2007 Cyclone Sidr and 2009 Cyclone Aila. The 1985 and 1991 disasters were most harmful to Urirchar.

Tahmina Haq Chowdhury, the wife of Asadul Haq Chowdhury, was made Urirchar's first Union Chairman in 1988. The island has been visited by Hussain Muhammad Ershad, Khaleda Zia and Sheikh Hasina. The Miah Bazar madrasa was founded in 2007 by Mawlana Abdur Rahman. In 2010, the Government of Bangladesh announced a plan to build a dam in Urir Char to reclaim land.

== Administration ==
Urir Char is divided into three mouzas.

List of chairmen
Number	Name	Term	Notes
01	Tahmina Haq Chowdhury	1988-2003	
02	Khayrul Alam Miah	2003-2007	
03	Muhammad Abdur Rahim	2007–present	

== Economy and tourism ==
There are several haat bazaars in the island, such as the New Bazar, Janata Bazar, Wahidpur Bazar, Subil Bazar, Burirpar Bazar, Bangla Bazar, Miah Bazar, Rajib Bazar and Colony Bazar. The Kewra-forest on the seaside is a popular tourist attraction located in the union's 6th ward.

Urirchar also has a significant number of expats contributing to its economy. A number of people from the villages of Narayanpur, Abdullahpur, Burirpar, Wahidpur, Syedpur, Hadipur, Shivanagar, Subil, Raghavpur, Pomkara have migrated to the Middle East, Italy and Malaysia.

== Facilities and education ==
Urir Char has a 26.4% literacy rate. It has one middle school (Urirchar Multilater Lower Middle School), four governmental primary schools (AH Naba Diganta, GU Saikat, Batajora and Meghna) and one playschool in Colony Bazar.

The island has 15 mosques and 8 eidgahs.
