= Abul Kashem Sandwip =

Bangladeshi educationist, journalist and organizer

- Born: 1 April 1944; Sarikait village, Sandwip Upazila, Chittagong District, Bengal Presidency, British India
- Died: 10 December 1995 (aged 51)

Abul Kashem Sandwip (1 April 1944 – 10 December 1995) was a Bangladeshi educationist, journalist and organizer. He is one of the founders of Bangladesh Betar, the national radio service of Bangladesh. He is the second person to read the declaration of the Independence of Bangladesh from the radio.

== Early life and education ==
Sandwip was born in Chittagong. His father was Noor Ahmed. He passed Matriculation examination in 1959 from South Sandwip High School, IA from Chittagong Government I.I College in 1964. He earned BA (Hons) degree in Bangla Literature in 1968 and MA in 1969 from Chittagong University. He was present during the declaration of Independence of Bangladesh.

== Awards ==
- Bangabandhu Gold Medal (1975)
- Azizur Rahman Literary Award (1986)
- Ekushey Padak (1998)
- Chand Sultana Literacy Award (2002)
