= Chowdhury Abu Torab Khan =

18th-century Bengali landowner and rebel

Shahid Chowdhury Abu Torab Khan
- Born: Sandwip, Bengal Subah, Mughal Empire
- Died: 1767; Sandwip, Bengal Presidency
- Known for: Rebellion
- Father: Muhammad Raja Khan

Chowdhury Abu Torab Khan (Bengali: চৌধুরী আবু তোরাব খাঁ), better known simply as Abu Torab (Bengali: আবু তোরাব), was an 18th-century Bengali Zamindar from Sandwip, an island in present-day Bangladesh. His hegemony later extended to islands of Hatiya and Bamni. He is best known as the leader of Bengal's first rebellion against the British East India Company. He had strong support from the local peasantry, and is regarded as a hero in the history of Bengal.

== Early life and background ==
Abu Torab was born into a wealthy Bengali Muslim Zamindar family in Sandwip, Bengal Subah during the Mughal period. His father was Muhammad Raja, the son of Junud Khan, the son of Chand Khan. Chand Khan was the husband of Musabibi, a powerful noblewoman and the eldest daughter of Dilal Khan, the last independent ruler of Sandwip defeated by Mughal imperialism. He succeeded Dilal Khan as the leader of Sandwip.

== Career ==
Torab's palace was situated in the village of Harishpur, on the western coast of Sandwip. According to British sources, he developed a notable contingent of 1500 armed slaves, each of whom he provided a house for, although native sources claim this is not true. Abu Torab overpowered all the local Zamindars (landowners) in his area and these smaller Zamindars aided him in the battle against Gokul Ghoshal. Ghoshal was the founder of Kidderpore's Bhukailas dynasty and was the clerk of Harry Verelst, the first British governor of Chittagong. At Ghoshal's suggestion, Verelst colonised Sandwip in 1763 and replaced the Mughal wadadar Ozakur Mal with Goshal. One of his loyal employees Vishnucharan Basu took the role as the first Wadadar in British Sandwip. At that time Ram Kishore Badujej was appointed as Basu's deputy. Abu Torab Chowdhury could not accept Gokul Ghoshal's authority, who had come to Sandwip to collect revenue on behalf of the East India Company between 1763 and 1764. Abu Torab readied his defence as soon as Ram Kishore set foot in Sandwip.

=== Rebellion ===
The aftermath of the Battle of Plassey in 1757 marked the start of colonial control in Bengal. Exactly 10 years following this event in 1767, Abu Torab gathered the people of Sandwip and rebelled against the colonial governors in Chittagong and their native allies such as Gokul Ghoshal. Abu Torab refrained from depositing revenue and instructed his general Malkam Singh to expel Ghoshal's representatives from Sandwip. A group of Company soldiers came from Chittagong and Lakshmipur to fight Abu Torab and his general. In the face of resistance and pressure, the representatives were forced to leave Sandwip within a few days.

== Death and legacy ==
Eventually, six Company troops led by Captain Nollekins and a few other generals, crossed the river and reached Sandwip in the middle of 1767. A fierce battle took place between Captain Nollekins' forces and Abu Torab's forces at Qillabari (Fort-house), not far from Char Ani Hat, a little north of the town of Sandwip. Abu Torab was killed in this battle as a result of treachery from one of his close relatives who had leaked his war strategy to the British Company. His armed slave contingent is the ancestors of the current Golam class in Sandwip.

After the fall of Abu Torab, the lesser zamindars of Sandwip accepted the tyranny of Gokul Ghoshal in return for their zamindaris (land, estates). After becoming the de facto ruler of Sandwip, Gokul Ghoshal gave the estate of Abu Torab in the name of Bhabanicharan Das. Shortly after, Ghoshal regained all the zamindaris and exerted full control. The Ghoshal dynasty had amassed a large amount of wealth through corruption, looting, salt lease and anonymous zamindari. Their Bhukailas Palace in Kidderpore stands today, built with the wealth of Sandwip's peasants, is remembered by locals with hatred. Numerous linked rebellions against the colonials took place in Sandwip subsequently, up until the Partition of India in 1947.

== See also ==
- Shahid Rahimullah
- Muharram Rebellion

== Bibliography ==
- Ali, Syed Murtaza, ed. (1964). History of Chittagong. Standard Publishers.
- Islam, Sirajul, ed. (1992). History of Bangladesh. Asiatic Society of Bangladesh.
