= Bauria Golam Khalek Academy =

Secondary school in Bangladesh

Location
- Bauria, Sandwip, Chittagong; Bangladesh
- 22.5198°N 91.4826°E

Information
- Established: 1947
- School board: Chittagong Education Board
- School code: 104961
- President: Nadim Sha Alamgir
- Headmaster: Nur Chapa
- Grades: 6 -10
- Gender: Co-educational
- Language: Bengali
- Campus type: Rural

Bauria Golam Khalek (G.K) Academy is a Government-Managed Private secondary school in Sandwip Upazila, Chittagong District, Bangladesh. The school is one of the oldest and biggest (in terms of the number of students) schools in Sandwip. The school was established by Zamindar Golam Khalek Chowdhury in 1947. In fact, Bauria G. K. Academy is a side-by-side two-school system; the Primary School runs from class one through five and the High School (Secondary School) runs from class six through ten. The entire campus of the school is established on the land donated by Golam Khalek Chowdhury. The school has a big play ground for various sports (including football) and cultural activities. This schools typically receive partial government funding and follow the National Curriculum, but it is managed by a school managing committee.

== Notable teachers and alumni ==
- Master Shahjahan BA, served the school as a teacher and played a very significant role in the early stage of the school. He was the president of the managing committee of the school for long time and contributed to the development and revival of the school from its miserable condition.
