= Gachua Adarsha High School =

Secondary school in Bangladesh

- গাছুয়া আদর্শ উচ্চ বিদ্যালয়

Location
- Delwar Kha Road; Gachua, Sandwip; Chittagong District; 4300; Bangladesh
- Coordinates: 22.535°N 91.478°E

Information
- Former name: Gachua Adarsha Girls High School
- Type: Secondary School
- Motto: প্রবেশ কর জ্ঞানের সন্ধানে, বাহির হও দেশের সেবায়। (Come to gain knowledge, be prepared to serve the nation.)
- Opened: 1 January 1987
- Founder: Abdul Baten
- School board: Chittagong Education Board
- School number: 104953
- School code: 3344
- Headmaster: Delwar Hossain
- Grades: Six-SSC
- Gender: Co-educational
- Language: Bengali
- Campus size: 1.73 acres (0.70 ha)
- Campus type: Rural
- Website: gachuaadarshahs.edu.bd
- Last updated: 30 Jan, 2023

Gachua Adarsha High School (Bengali: গাছুয়া আদর্শ উচ্চ বিদ্যালয়) is a secondary school in Sandwip in Chittagong District, Bangladesh. It is a sixth grade through SSC-level institution. The school code is 3344 and EIIN is 104953.

== History ==
The institution was established in 1987 as Gachua Adarsha Girls High School only for girls. The school was reformed combining boys in 2001. The name was then changed to Gachua Adarsha High School. The first batch combining the boys attended Secondary School Certificate (SSC) examinations in 2006.

Nurul Huda, the founding headmaster, contributed a lot to the improvement of the school from the very beginning. He retired in 2009. Nur Chapa, an assistant teacher of Abdul Khalek Academy joined as the headmaster in 2010 through a competitive examination. He went to Katirhat High School in 2010. After that, Delwar Hossain, also an assistant teacher of Abdul Khalek Academy joined Gachua Adarsha High School as the headmaster in 2011; till now he is in the same post.

The people of the school area took shelter during the Cyclones Sidr and Aila in the Karitas bhaban.

== Teachers' statistics ==
Designation	Number
Headmaster	01
Assistant Headmaster	01
Senior Teacher	06
Assistant Teacher	04
Total	12

== See also ==
- List of schools in Sandwip
- List of schools in Chittagong
- Kargil Government High School
