= Sultan Balkhi =

Hazrat Ibrahim Shah Sultan Balkhi Mahisawar
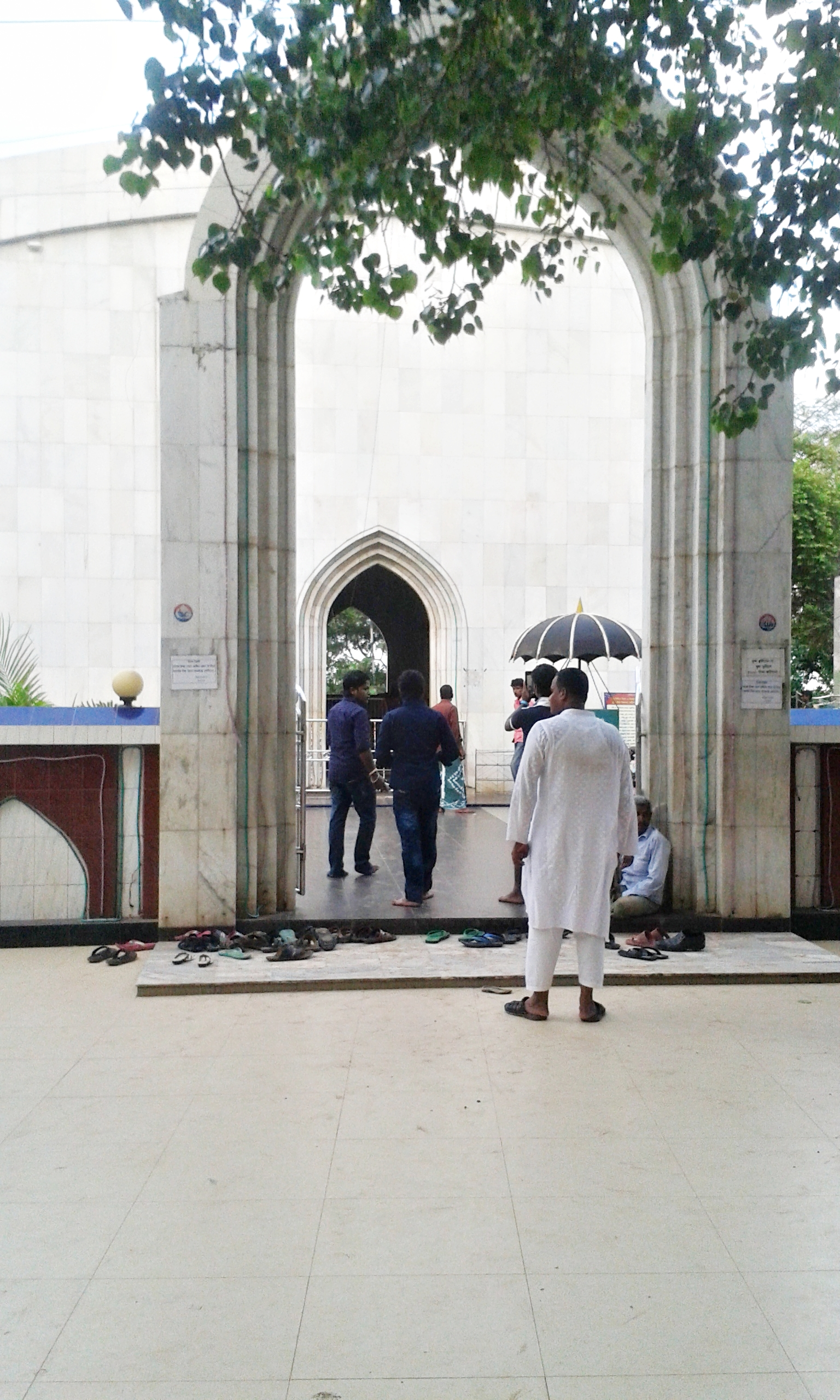
- The mazar of Mahisawar

Personal life
- Born: Balkh, modern-day Afghanistan
- Died: Mahasthangarh, Pundravardhana (modern-day Bogura, Bangladesh)
- Resting place: Mausoleum of Sultan Balkhi, Shibganj, Bogra
- Parent: Shah Ali Asghar Balkhi (father)
- Other name: Bolkhi Mahisowar

Religious life
- Religion: Islam

Muslim leader
- Based in: Mahasthangarh, Pundravardhana
- Period in office: 16th century

Ibrahim Shah Sultan Balkhi (Bengali: শাহ সুলতান বলখী, Persian: شاه سلطان بلخی), also known by his sobriquet, Mahisawar (Bengali: মাহিসওয়ার, Persian: ماهی سوار, romanized: Mâhi-Savâr, lit. 'Fish-rider'), was a 14th-century Muslim saint. He is associated with the spread of Islam in Sandwip and Bogra.

== Early life ==
Balkhi was the son of Shah Ali Asghar, a ruler of Balkh in Afghanistan. He was the crown prince but left this role to become a follower of the religious preacher, Sheikh Tawfiq of Damascus.

== Migration to Bengal ==
One day the Sheikh ordered Balkhi to go to the land of Bengal and preach the religion of Islam there. Balkhi then set off by boat, eventually reaching the island of Sandwip where he remained in for a number of years. His boat was a barge and shaped like a fish; leading to him earning the nickname of Mahi-sawar (fish-rider). He then went to Hariramnagar, most likely another island, which was ruled by Balaram, a Hindu Raja who worshipped Kali. Balaram's minister decided to accept Islam which angered the Raja. A feud took place eventually leading to Balaram's death.

Balkhi then decided to leave Hariramnagar so he leaped on his boat, reaching the ancient city of Mahasthangarh, the capital of the Pundravardhana kingdom, ruled by Narsingh Parshuram of the Bhoj Garh dynasty. Balkhi asked Parshuram for permission to live in his domain and freely practice his religion to which the King allowed. Balkhi preached to the native Buddhists and Chilhan, the army chief of Raja Parshuram, amongst many others accepted the message of Islam. Parshuram, like Balaram, was also not happy with Balkhi's missionary activities and a war took place. Another officer of Parshuram, Harapal, betrayed the king and also became a Muslim. This led to Balkhi eventually defeating Parshuram and conquering his fort in 1343. Parshuram was the last Buddhist king of Mahasthangarh. After hearing the news of her father's death, the King's daughter, Princess Shiladevi drowned herself in the Karatoya River. The area around her drowning place is known as Shila Devi's Ghat.

== Legacy ==
It is unknown how and when Balkhi died. During the reign of Mughal emperor Aurangzeb in 1685, the dargah of Balkhi was a rent-free land and sanads were issued to Syed Muhammad Tahir, Syed Abd ar-Rahman and Syed Muhammad Reza. The Mughals paid great attention to the shrine and built a gate entry to Balkhi's mausoleum called Buri Ka Darwaza. In 1719, during the reign of Emperor Farrukhsiyar, Khodadil built a large single-domed mosque near the shrine which remains in use today.
