= Abdul Hakim (poet) =

Bengali poet (c. 1620–1690)

- আব্দুল হাকিম
- Born: 1620; Babupur, Sandwip, Portuguese Chittagong, Portuguese Empire
- Died: 1690 (aged 69–70); Bengal Subah, Mughal Empire
- Occupations: Poet, translator
- Era: 17th century
- Known for: Bengali epics, Persian translations, promotion of Bengali language
- Notable work: Nur Nama; Shihabuddin Nama; Lalmati Saifulmulk; Nasihat Nama

Abdul Hakim (c. 1620 – c. 1690) was a Bengali poet and translator who wrote several Bengali epics and also translated some Persian manuscripts.

== Early life ==
Hakim was born in Babupur village in 1620. Babupur is generally said to be the modern-day village of Sudharam in the island of Sandwip. In addition to his fluency in the Bengali language, he also studied Arabic, Persian and Sanskrit.

== Career ==
Hakim is well known for his patriotism and specially his love for Bengali. In his day, elite Bengali Muslims looked down upon it, favoured the Persian court language instead. Hakim criticized their disdainful attitude towards the local tongue.

যেসব বঙ্গেত জন্মি হিংসে বঙ্গবাণী
সেসব কাহার জন্ম নির্ণয় না জানি
দেশী ভাষা বিদ্যা যার মনে ন জুয়ায়

— Abdul Hakim, "Bangabani"

Whoever hates the verses of the Bangla being born in the soil of the land
It is unknown to determine the essence of their birth
He, who is not satisfied with his own language and learning

— Translated by Jahangir S. Dickens

Hakim's most notable work was Nur Nama (Story of Light), a depiction of the life of Muhammad. Other books he wrote are Shihabuddin Nama, Karbala, Lalmati Saifulmulk, Nasihat Nama, Chari Mokam Bhedh, Shahar Nama, Hanifar Ladai, and Durre Majlish. He translated the Persian romance Yusuf Wa Zulekha (1483 AD) in Bengali.
