= AKM Asadul Haq =

- Born: 1 December 1928; Sandwip, Bengal, British India
- Died: 17 April 1971 (aged 42); Chittagong Cantonment, Chittagong, Bangladesh
- Education: Chittagong College; Dhaka Medical College
- Military career
- Allegiance: Bangladesh; Pakistan (before 1971)
- Branch: Bangladesh Army; Pakistan Army
- Service years: 1953 - 1971
- Rank: Major
- Unit: Army Medical Corps
- Known for: Martyred Intellectual
- Conflicts: Bangladesh Liberation War; Operation Searchlight †

Shaheed Alamgirul Kamaluddin Mohammed Asadul Haq was a Bangladeshi physician and an army officer in the Pakistan Army who was killed in the Bangladesh Liberation War and is considered a martyr in Bangladesh.

== Early life ==
Haq was born on 1 December 1928 at Santoshpur, Sandwip Upazila, Chittagong District, East Bengal, British Raj. He graduated from Kathghar High School in 1944 and from Chittagong College in 1946. He completed his MBBS from Dhaka Medical College in 1952. He was harassed by police during his internship at Dhaka Medical College for treating protesters injured in the 1952 Language Movement.

== Career ==
In 1953, Haq joined the Pakistan Army Medical Corps. He completed his FCPS in Quetta, West Pakistan, and FRCS from the Royal College of Physicians and Surgeons in 1962. From 1956 to 1970, he served in various Combined Military Hospitals of the Pakistan Army, including in Abbottabad Cantonment, Bagh, Azad Kashmir, Jessore Cantonment, Multan Cantonment, and Sargodha Cantonment. In 1970 he was appointed commanding officer of the Armed Forces Medical Store Depot in Chittagong Cantonment.

== Death ==
Haq was arrested along with his family after the start of Operation Searchlight by the Pakistan Army on 25 March 1971. They were imprisoned inside the Combined Medical Hospital. He, along with some other Bengali Army officers, was executed by the Pakistan Army on 17 April 1971.
