= Belayet Hossain =

Bangladeshi freedom fighter

Belayet Hossain BU
- Belayet Hossain
- Born: Kasba, Brahmanbaria
- Died: 14 November 1971
- Known for: Bir Uttom

Belayet Hossain (Bengali: বেলায়েত হোসেন, died 14 November 1971) was a heroic Freedom Fighter of the Bangladesh Liberation War. For his bravery in the war of independence, the government of Bangladesh awarded him the title of Bir Uttam.

== Birth and education ==
The house of martyr Belayet Hossain is in Gachua village of Sandwip Upazila of Chittagong District. His father's name is Majed Mia and mother's name is Bibi Mariam. His wife's name is Tafsila Begum. He has one son and one daughter.

Belayet Hossain served in the 4th East Bengal Regiment of the Pakistan Army. In 1971, this regiment was stationed in Comilla Cantonment. He was in Brahmanbaria from the beginning of March. When the liberation war started, he played an important role in revolting and joining the war. At the end of the resistance war, he fought in the Salda River sub-sector of Sector 2.

== Role in the liberation war ==
On 14 November 1971, it occupied most of the area of Salda River in Kasba Upazila of Brahmanbaria District. The freedom fighters of Salda River sub-sector of Sector 2 divided into several groups and attacked the defensive position of the Pakistan Army earlier on the night of 12 November. On 14 November at one o'clock, A strong contingent of Pakistani troops marched through the godown area west of Monowara village to retake the Salda River. Belayet Hossain with his team attacked the advancing Pakistani Army whose soldiers then began to retreat while firing back. Hossain's wish was to capture one or two enemy soldiers alive. He continued to move forward when he was shot in the head. He fell to the ground and died in battle.

== Tomb ==
With the help of the villagers, Belayet was buried along with other martyred freedom fighters on a hill in Kullapathar village. This cemetery is now known as Kullapathar Shaheed Memorial.

== Awards and honors ==
- Bir Uttom

== Gallery ==
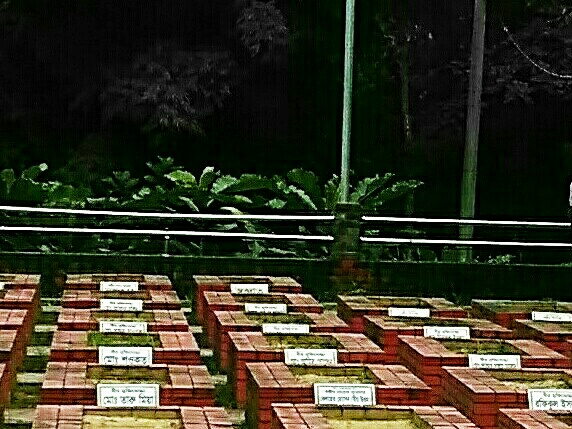
Belayet's grave at Kullapathar Shaheed Memorial (front and center)

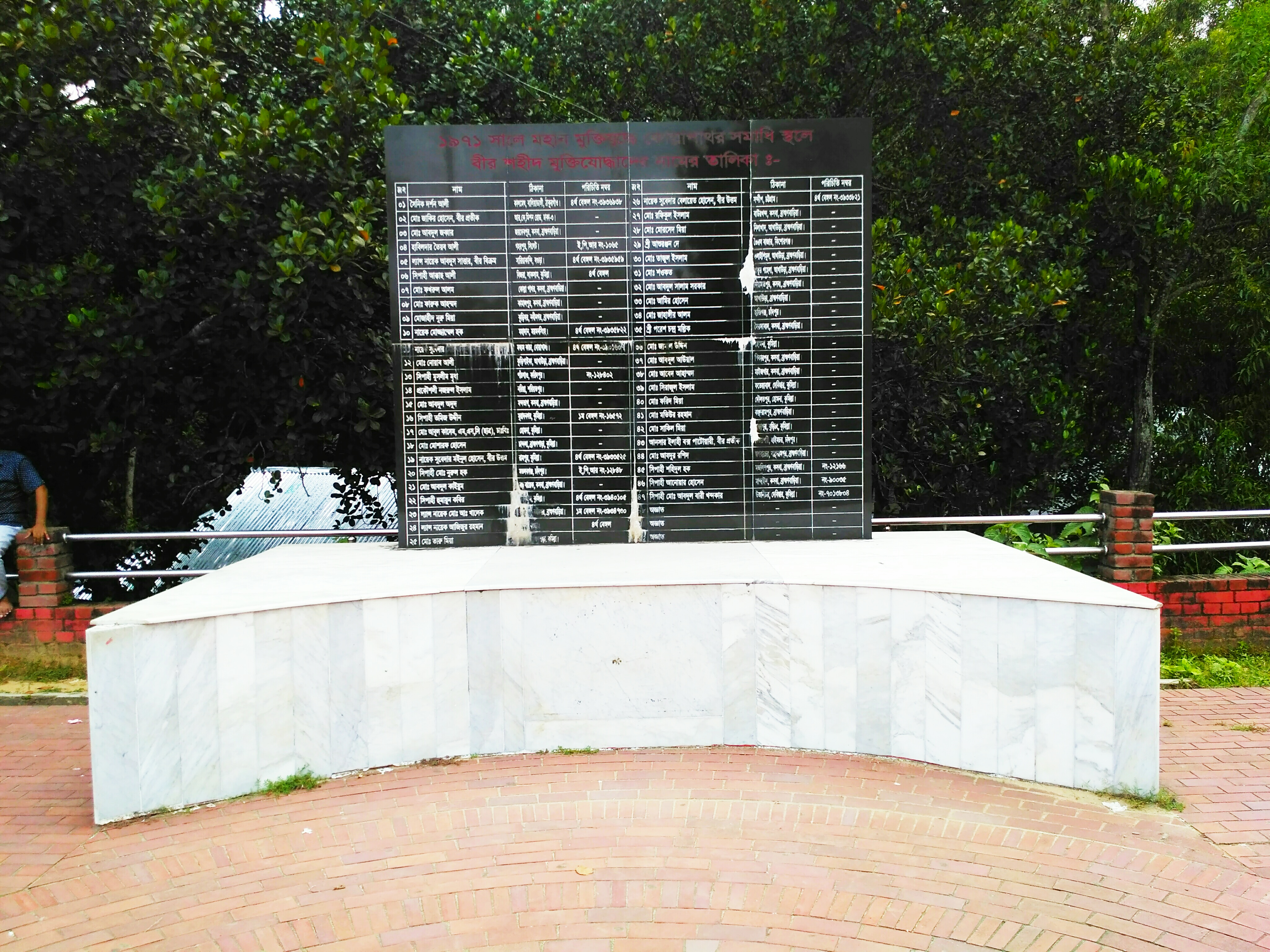
"List of names of heroic freedom fighters at Kollapathar Cemetery during the Great War of Liberation in 1971" Name of Martyr Belayet on plaque (Serial No.26)

== Footnotes ==
- This article has been translated from the original report titled "তোমাদের এ ঋণ শোধ হবে না" published on 29 March 2012 in The Daily Prothom Alo. The Daily Prothom Alo has released a Creative Commons Attribution-Share-Alike 3.0 international license on Wikipedia (Permitted). The reports were written by Rashedur Rahman (also known as Tara Rahman) on behalf of The Daily Prothom Alo Liberation War Trust.
