= Sandwip Island =

Island in Bangladesh

Sandwip
Native name: সন্দ্বীপ
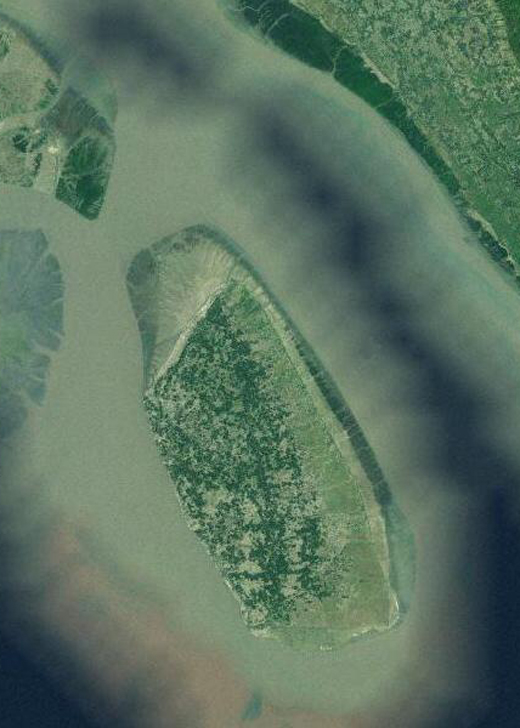
- Satellite view of Sandwip

- Location within Bangladesh

Geography
- Location: Bay of Bengal
- Coordinates: 22°29′N 91°29′E
- Adjacent to: Bay of Bengal
- Total islands: 3
- Major islands: 1
- Area: 762.42 km^{2} (294.37 sq mi)
- Length: 50 km (31 mi)
- Width: 5–15 km (3.1–9.3 mi)

Administration
- Bangladesh
- Division: Chittagong Division
- District: Chittagong District
- Upazila: Sandwip Upazila

Demographics
- Demonym: Sandwipi
- Population: 292,773 (2001)
- Pop. density: 384/km^{2} (995/sq mi)

Sandwip (Bengali: সন্দ্বীপ, romanized: Sôndbīp, pronounced [ʃondip]) is an island located in the southeastern coast of Bangladesh in the Chittagong District. Along with the island of Urir Char and Bhasan Char, this is part of Sandwip Upazila.

== Description ==
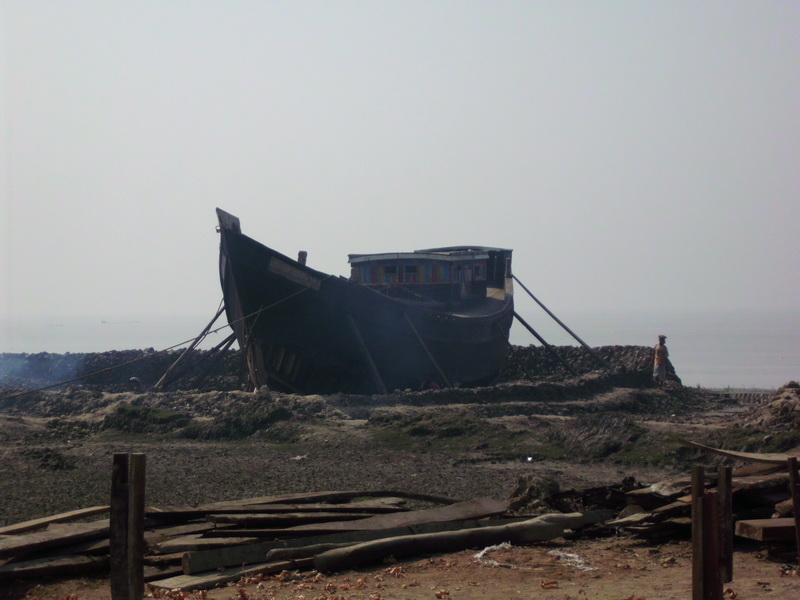
Small ship building yard in the coastal area of Sandwip

Sandwip (সন্দ্বীপ) is located in the north-east of the Bay of Bengal, near the port city of Chittagong. It is close to the mouth of the Meghna River in the Bay of Bengal and is separated from the Chittagong coast by Sandwip Channel. It has a population of 292,773. There are fifteen wards, 62 mahallas and 34 villages on Sandwip Island. The island is 50 kilometres (31 mi) long and 5–15 kilometres (3.1–9.3 mi) wide. The island is bounded by Companiganj on the north; the Bay of Bengal on the south; Sitakunda, Mirsharai, and Sandwip Channel on the east; and the Noakhali Sadar, Hatiya and Meghna estuaries; on the west.

== History ==
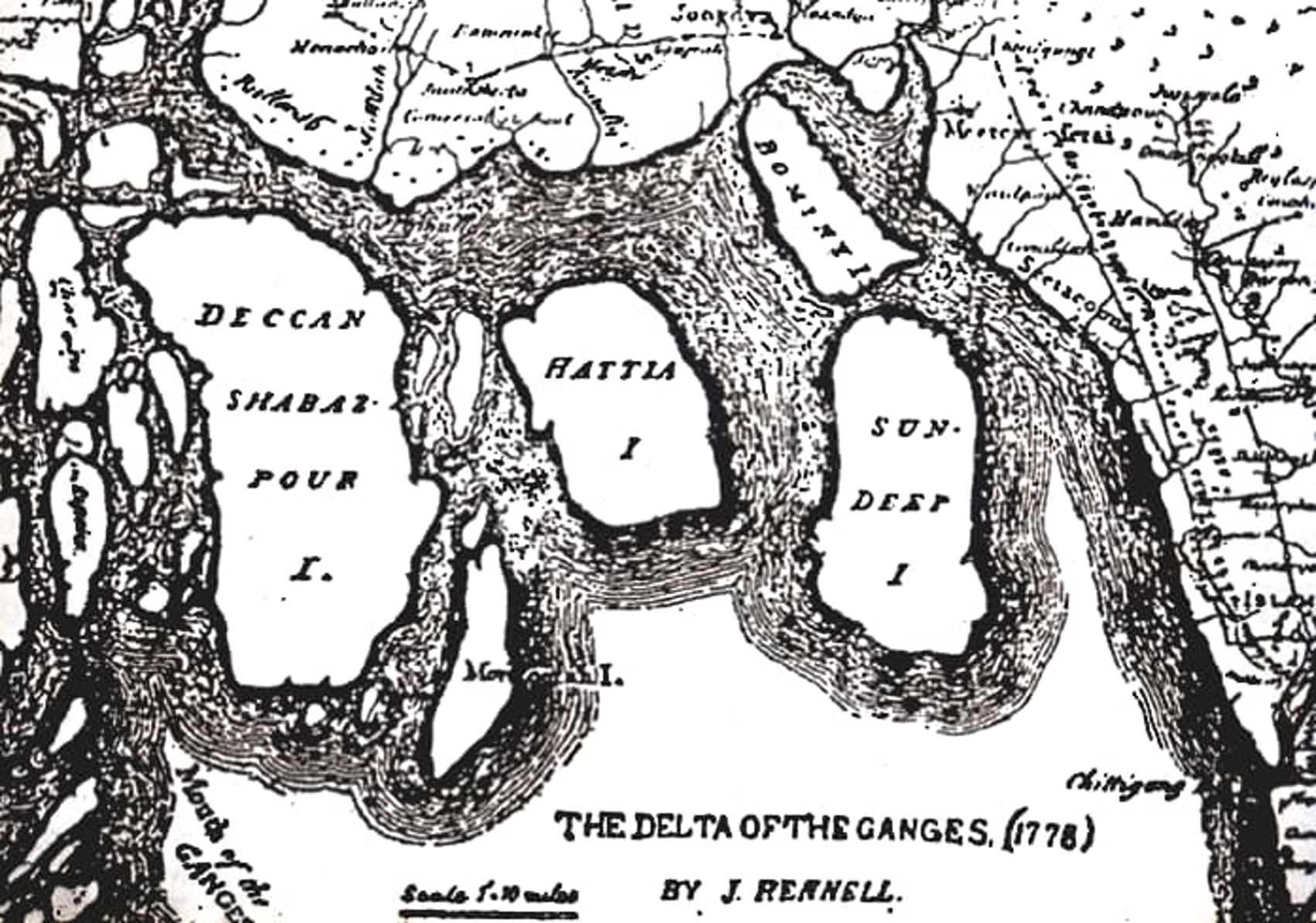
Sandwip on a map of the delta of Ganges by surveyor James Rennell created in 1778

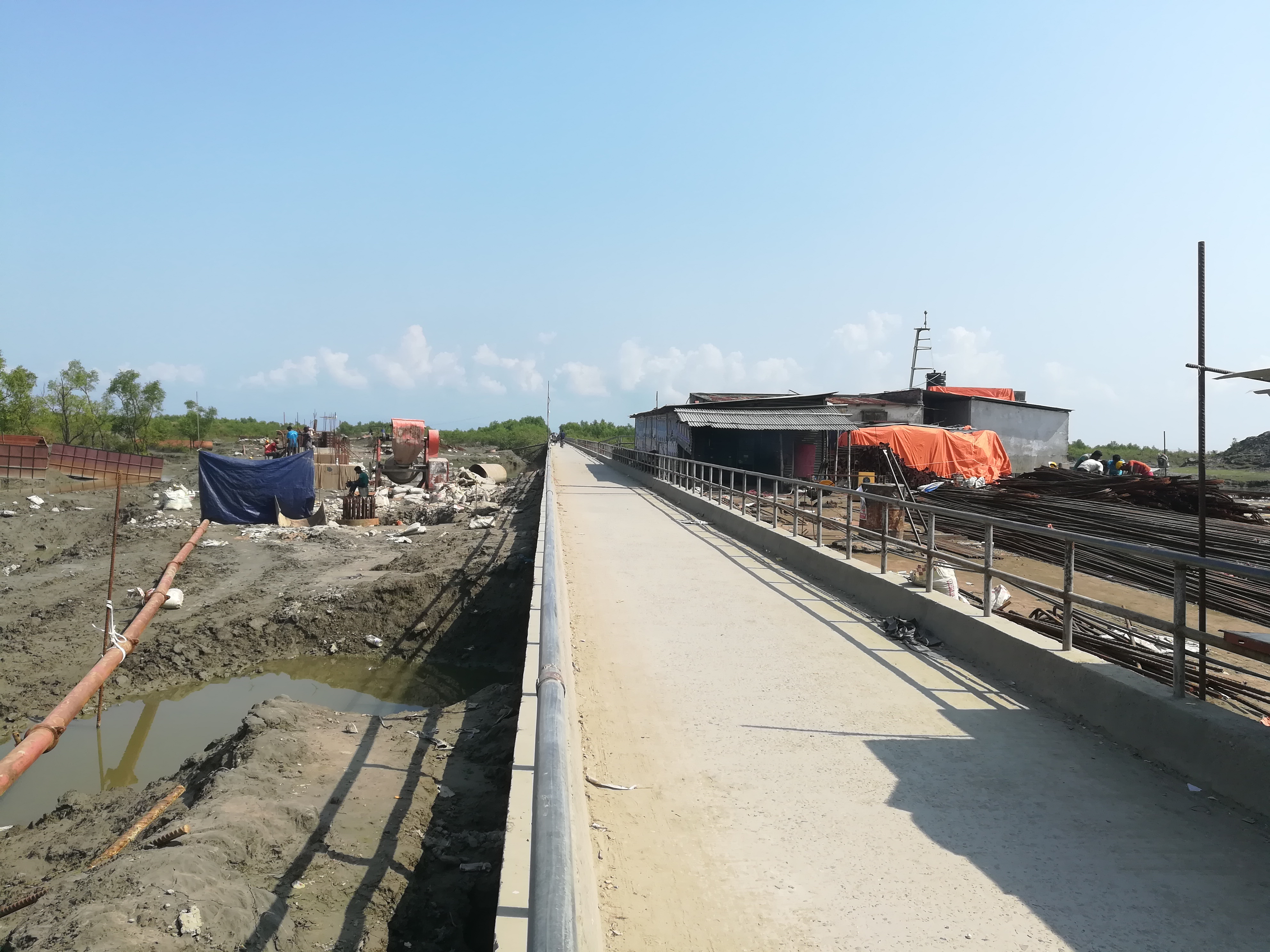
Guftasara Bridge, Sandwip

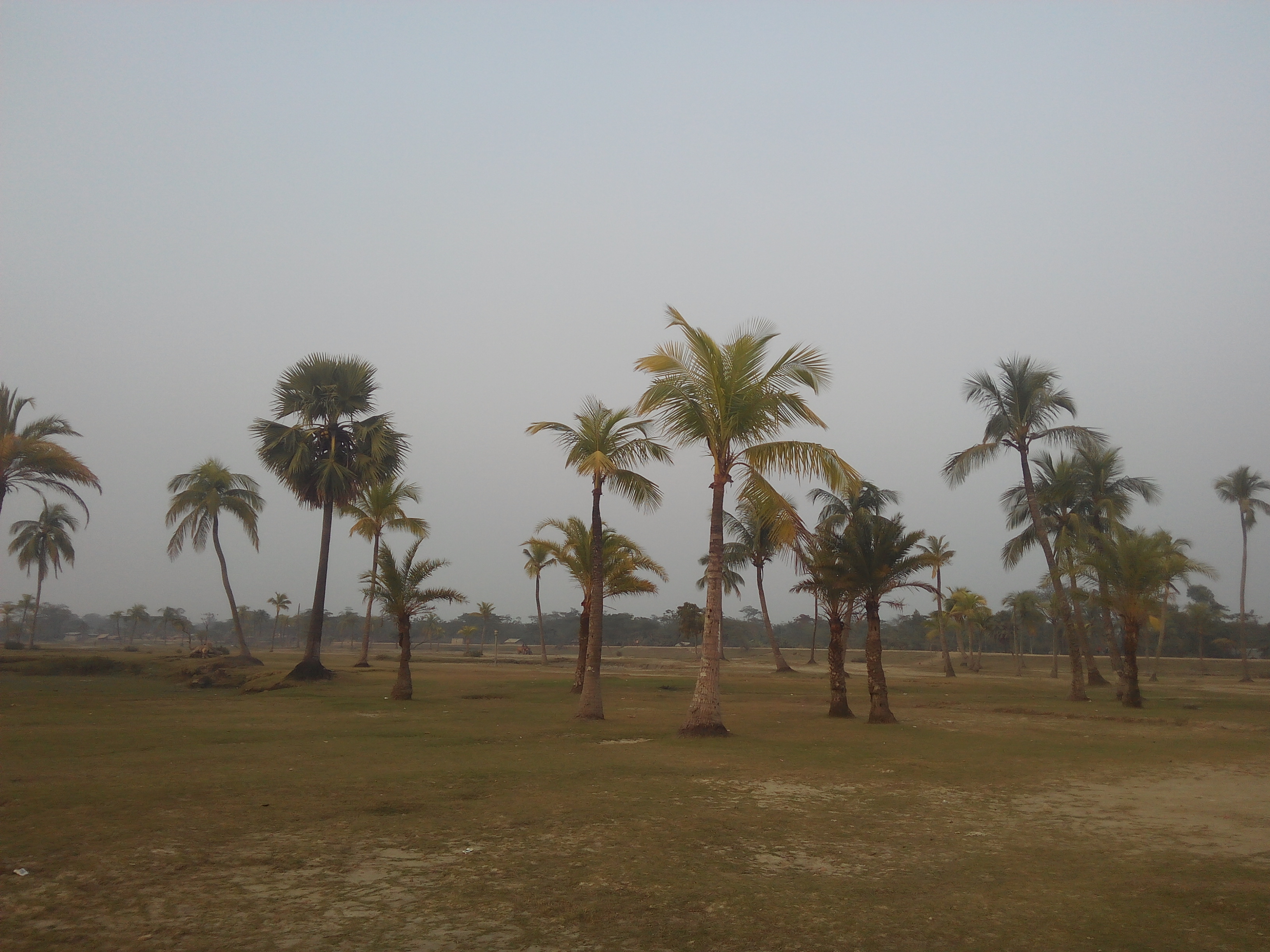
The beaches of Sandwip

Some sources claim Sandwip island is around 3000 years old, and was a part of Samatata. The sources state that Sandwip was originally connected to Chittagong by land and was disconnected by natural disasters. Sandwip is mentioned in scholarly sources such as Tansi's report Lower Gangas in 150, The Baros Map in 1560, Sanchan the Abevel's drawing map, and the Anvel Curt's drawing map in 1752. Arab merchants began trading in the area since very early on. In the 14th century, a Sufi from Afghanistan called Sultan Balkhi visited the island and lived there for a few years.

In the 16th century, the island became an important source of salt for Bengal. (Note: "Sandwip is evidently a very old island, and seems to have been of more importance three hundred years ago than it is now [mid-1800s], because it was one of the chief sources from which Bengal was supplied with salt." "Du Jarric ... tells us that it is opposite Sripur, and that it supplies all Bengal with salt.") In the 1560s, a traveller from Venice called, Caesar Frederick, was the first European to write about Sandwip. Returning homeward from Pegu, he was caught in a typhoon whilst sailing from Chittagong to Cochin. After being tossed about for some days, his ship sighted an island and landed. He wrote:

We found it a place inhabited, and, to my judgment, the fertilest island in all the world; the which is divided into two parts by a channel which passeth between it. With great trouble we brought our ship into the same channel, which parteth the island at flowing water.

Frederick described the island as a densely populated, well-cultivated island inhabited by Moors. In 1923, Sri Rajkumar Chakrabarty mentioned in History of Sandwip the prevalence of 400- to 500-year-old plants on the island.

=== Early modern period ===
The island of Sandwip was administered under the Sarkar of Fatehabad under the Mughal empire. At the start of the 17th century, the island was under the rule of António de Sousa Godinho, a Portuguese pirate, though it had previously been ruled by Kedar Rai, a Bengali Hindu chieftain who controlled large parts of eastern Bengal. According to Pierre Du Jarric, Kedar Rai managed to reclaim the governance of Sandwip from Godinho with the help of another group of Portuguese pirates. The Mughals and the Arakanese failed to annex the island from Kedar Rai. By 1602, a Portuguese settler from Montargil, in Kedar Rai's service, Domingos de Carvalho, managed to earn the governorship of Sandwip after assisting Rai in battles against the Arakan and the Mughals. Manuel de Matos came from Chittagong to aid Carvalho in the Portuguese annexation, and they divided the island between themselves and a Portuguese pirate named Gonçalves. Filipe de Brito e Nicote also established a fort on the island. It is said that, each year, about 300 salt-loaded ships sailed from Sandwip for Liverpool. In addition to its salt industry, Sandwip also became known for ship-building at the time. Eventually, the Portuguese held the island in-conjunction with the Arakanese and Muslim rulers. Even today, some of the architecture on the island reflects the island's history as a 17th-century pirate-stronghold. Philip III, the King of Portugal, ennobled Carvalho for his efforts.

The loyalty of the Portuguese, however, was suspected by the Arakanese. The Arakanese King of Mrauk U, Min Razagyi would execute many of the Portuguese settlers in his kingdom. In November 1602, the Jesuits fled to Sandwip following the imprisonment and execution of their head priest, Fernandes, in Chittagong (which was under Arakanese rule). Carvalho fled to Jessore for safety, but the city's ruler, Pratapaditya—an ally of the Arakanese—had him executed and sent his severed head back to Arakan. Other sources say that Carvalho was not killed by Pratapaditya, but rather wounded in battle against the Mughals, and that he fled to Hugli. Ultimately he was succeeded by Manuel de Matos, but the Portuguese were defeated in Sandwip during Matos' office and the island was taken by Fateh Khan. Khan then developed a garrison of Muslim soldiers and a fleet of 40 sailboats on the island.

=== Tibao rule ===
Sebastião Gonçalves Tibao, a salt-dealer who had come to Bengal in 1605, had escaped Arakanese punishment in Dianga with some other Portuguese captives and began a life of piracy consisting of robbing the Arakan port and keeping the stolen goods with their native allies in Bakla, or as some sources say, Bhatkal. In March 1609, Fateh Khan dispatched a fleet to suppress these pirates who had been located in nearby South Shahbazpur. In retaliation, Tibao led 400 Portuguese mercenaries with a plan to colonise Sandwip. Tibao negotiated a deal with the King of Bakla or Bhatkal, receiving support in the form of ships and 200 horses for the takeover in exchange for half of the island's future revenue. However, Tibao withheld the agreed payment and later warred with the King of Bakla. A great battle took place in Sandwip, and it was only resolved after a Spanish ship of 50 men arrived at the island to help the Portuguese take over the Sandwip Fort. Fateh Khan, 3000 Muslim pirates and all of the island's male Muslim inhabitants were killed, allowing Tibao to become the ruler of Sandwip.

Razagyi was furious with Tibao's colonisation of Sandwip, but he faced an even more urgent threat, that the Mughal governor of Bengal was planning an attack on nearby Bhulua, so he agreed to an alliance with Tibao and even married his daughter off to him. Razagyi despatched 700 elephants, 200 ships with 4,000 men, and 90,000 soldiers to join Tibao's military under his command. Tibao later broke the alliance and seized the entire naval fleet by "murdering its captains at a council" in 1611. The Mughals defeated Arakan, with Razagyi fleeing to Chittagong with only a few men. Wishing to take advantage of this development and avenge the 1609 Dianga captives, Tibao destroyed the forts of Arakan but was defeated by Razagyi at the capital and returned to Sandwip.

Tibao was described to have become the "absolute sovereign" of Sandwip, as he was even obeyed by the natives as an independent ruler. In the course of a short time, his territory extended to the up until the Lemro River. He had a house built for himself and heavily increased trade in the island, boosting its economy. Many merchants visited the island, and by their commerce contributed to his revenue. Tibao developed a military of 80 cannon ships, 200 horses, 2,000 native soldiers and 1,000 Portuguese soldiers. Tibao later colonised the islands of South Shahbazpur and Patelbanga from the Raja of Batecala (Bacola). In 1616, Tibao denounced himself as an independent sovereign, offering to become a dependent ruler under the Portuguese Empire and annually provide Portuguese Goa with large amounts of rice. The condition behind the deal was for the Portuguese Viceroy of Goa to assist Tibao in a battle against Arakan, which was now ruled by Razagyi's son, Min Khamaung. The Viceroy of Goa accepted the deal and dispatched a fleet led by Don Francisco. They joined Tibao's fifty ships, sailing towards Arakan. However, Khamaung and his Dutch allies defeated Tibao, who fled back to Sandwip. By 1617, Sandwip was seized by Mrauk U, reducing Tibao to his former miserable condition and killing many of its inhabitants. Many Portuguese pirates were also transported to Chittagong as sailors and gunners as Khamaung feared the growing power of the Muslims.

=== Mughal conquest of Sandwip ===
In the 1620s, cleric Samuel Purchas described the inhabitants of Sandwip as majority Mohammedans and mentioned the presence of a 300-year old mosque in the island. Abdul Hakim was a prominent medieval Bengali poet from Sandwip who was active in this period. Delwar Khan, also known as Raja Dilal, was the final pirate ruler of Sandwip. A former Mughal officer, he and his private army governed the island independently for about 50 years. In November 1665, Shaista Khan, the Mughal governor of Bengal, appointed General Abul Hasan to lead the conquest of Sandwip with the support of the Dutch military. Dilwar was 80 years old by that time. Abul Hassan attacked Sandwip and fought with Dilawar, who after being hit by an arrow fled to the jungles. Meanwhile, the Arakanese fleet came up to Sandip to render assistance to Dilawar. Abul Hassan prepared to assault the Arakanese fleet, which withdrew, and Abul Hasan, not pursuing it, retired to Noakhali. Nawab Shaista Khan, on hearing of this, sent another fleet consisting of 1,500 gunners and 400 cavalry, commanded by Ibn-i-Husain, Superintendent of the Nawarah (Fleet), Jamal Khan, Serandaz Khan, Qaramal Khan, and Muhammad Beg to reinforce Abul Hassan; to co-operate with the latter and occupy Sandwip; and to extirpate Dilawar. Ibn-i-Husain with this reinforcement moved up to Noakhali, in front of Sandwip, and halted there with Muhammad Beg in order to blockade the passage of the Arakanese fleet. Abul Hassan, with others, then attacked Sandwip, wounded and captured Sharif, son of Dilawar, and also captured, after severe fighting, Dilawar and his followers, and sent them prisoners to Jahangirnagar (Dhaka). Dilawar had many sons and two daughters; Musabibi and Maryam Bibi. Among his sons, only the name of Sharif Khan is known. As a means of compensation, Shaista Khan granted Dilawar's younger sons a jagir of 10-12 villages on the banks of the Dhaleshwari River in Patharghata-Mithapukur near Dhaka. These villages were destroyed due to fluvial erosion two hundred years later. The family then relocated to the village of Ganda in Savar.

The Arakanese also fell out with the Portuguese, which led to the Portuguese assisting the Mughals. By 26 January 1666, the Mughal conquest of Sandwip was successful and the chief captain of the European pirates was rewarded.

=== Mughal rule ===
Abdul Karim Khan was subsequently appointed as the Mughal faujdar (military governor) of Sandwip. He had 100 cavalry and 400 infantry under his control. In order to facilitate the collection of revenue, a man named Muhammad Qasim was appointed as the Ahaddar (secretary) of Sandwip. The locals were outraged by Dilawar's defeat at the hands of the Mughals and the loss of Sandwip's independent status. The Mughal administration took some public welfare measures to bring the situation in their favour. One of them was to reducing the rate of rent imposed by Dilawar, in their first year. Another notable move was that Sandwip was given a lease arrangement to subdue the island's elite. When the lessees collected the rent and submitted it to Muhammad Qasim, he would arrange for it to be sent to the treasury. Under this system, the lessees enjoyed financial benefits and status.

Dilal's son-in-law Chand Khan rose to prominence in the 1670s and the Mughal administration realised that collecting Sandwip's revenue would not be an easy task if Khan was not on their side. Sandwip's lease arrangement was given to Khan to facilitate revenue collection. After settling the lease, Khan realised that it would not be possible for him to collect the revenue of the vast Sandwip alone. He subcontracted various parts of the island to two relatives, Bakhtiyar Muhammad and Muhammad Hanif, as well as Madhusudan Chaudhuri of Bakla-Chandradwip, an employee of the Qanungo office. These lessees later became the Zamindars of Sandwip. Khan left more than half of the island to himself and then distributed five-eighths of the remainder to Bakhtiyar Muhammad and Muhammad Hanif and three eighths to Madhusudan Chowdhury. A portion of Sandwip, Sholo Anna was jointly owned to meet various expenses. Part of the sub-contracted lessees later became known as Dihi Musapur, Dihi Bakharpur and Dihi Rampur. Khan's headquarters was located west of the Musapur Dighi (lake) and continues to be known as Sadari Bhita although the building is no longer standing.

From around 1690 to the 1730s, the zamindars of Sandwip were Chand Khan's two sons, Junud Khan and Muqim Khan, Muhammad Hanif's son Muhammad Muqim, as well as Madhusudan Chaudhuri son Janardan Chaudhuri. Being the successors of Chand Khan, Junud Khan and Muqim Khan generally dominated rule over the island. In the next period, the prominent landowners of the island were Muhammad Raja (son of Junud Khan), Muhammad Husayn (son of Muqim Khan), Bakhar Muhammad and Zafar Muhammad (sons of Muhammad Muqim) and Ramchandra Chaudhuri (son of Janardan Chowdhury). Bakharpur was named after Bakhar Muhammad's zamindari. Muhammad Husayn died in 1743.

The next zamindars of Sandwip were Chowdhury Abu Torab Khan, Muhammad Murad, Muhammad Ibrahim, Muhammad Wasim, Muhammad Akbar and Surya Narayan Chowdhury. From 1750 to 1763, Abu Torab overpowered the other zamindars and dominated the island under a single authority. Ghoshal, the founder of Khidrpur's Ghoshal dynasty and the clerk of Harry Verelst, the first British governor of Chittagong, suggested that Verelst colonise Sandwip in 1763 and replace the Mughal wadadar Ozakur Mal with him. One of Verelst's employees Vishnucharan Basu took the role as the first Wadadar in British Sandwip. Ram Kishore Badujej was appointed as Basu's deputy. Abu Torab could not accept Ghoshal's authority and fought against it, but was ultimately defeated.

The volume of shipbuilding in Sandwip increased extensively during the Mughal period. In the 17th century, the shipyards of Sandwip were used to build warships for the Ottoman caliphs.

In the late 18th century to early 19th century, Armenian merchants began to do business on the island. Khojah Kaworke, Khojah Michael and Agha Barshick owned several salt farms in Sandwip, and the existence of salt factories were noted by Italian traveller Niccolao Manucci.

=== Modern period ===
By the time the island came under British rule, it had a mixed population of Bengalis, both Muslim and Hindu, many of whom had arrived from Dhaka, as well as Buddhist Arakanese. The working population consisted of farmers, fishermen, pirates, and robbers. The British initially struggled in administrating the island as its inhabitants frequently made complaints. They eventually appointed a commissioner but he too would complain of the difficulties in managing the island with constant petitions from the Taluqdars. Abu Torab led Bengal's first anti-British peasant rebellion against Captain Nollekins in 1767. As a result of the tumultuous administration, the island was given direct attention to the District Collector in 1785. In 1822, the island joined the District of Noakhali. In 1912, many Muslim men from Sandwip travelled to the Balkan Peninsula to fight alongside the Ottoman Empire during the Balkan Wars. Keshab Ghosh, a President of the Indian National Congress, led the Violation of Law movement in Sandwip in 1930.

It is said that Sheikh Mujibur Rahman's 1966 Six Point movement began in Sandwip. During the 1970 Pakistani general election campaign, Mohammad Shah Bangali of Sandwip was the folk singer mascot for the Awami League. The area was heavily affected during the 1970 Bhola cyclone and as a response, the Government of Pakistan sent three gunboats and a hospital ship carrying medical personnel and supplies. The Government of Singapore sent a military medical mission to the country, which was then deployed to Sandwip where they treated nearly 27,000 people and carried out a smallpox vaccination effort. During the Bangladesh War of 1971, Sandwip was included in Sector 1. On 10 May, many civilians were murdered including Jahedur Rahman, a lawyer in Sandwip town, who was killed on Kargil Bridge. On the same day, Jasim Uddin, a student at the Chittagong College, was arrested in Sandwip and taken to Chittagong to be imprisoned. He was later released but continued as a Bengali freedom fighter, leading to his execution on 10 December.

A Bangladesh Navy fleet headquarters at Sandwip Channel with ship berthing facilities is being constructed as part of Forces Goal 2030.

== Agriculture ==
Sandwip Island was formed by silt deposits from the estuary of the Meghna river, enriching the land with sediments and becoming highly fertile, to the point that agriculture is the main occupation of most of the island's population. The many crops grown include rice, jute, potato, betel leaf and betel nut, chilli, sugarcane, radish, tomato, eggplants, cauliflower, okra, cabbage, mustard, corn, ginger, various legumes and green beans, sweet potato, carrot, coriander, mint, and more. There is also fruit, including citrus, watermelon, mango, jackfruit, banana, cherimoya, sapote, coconuts, papaya, guava, kul (breadfruit) and date palms.

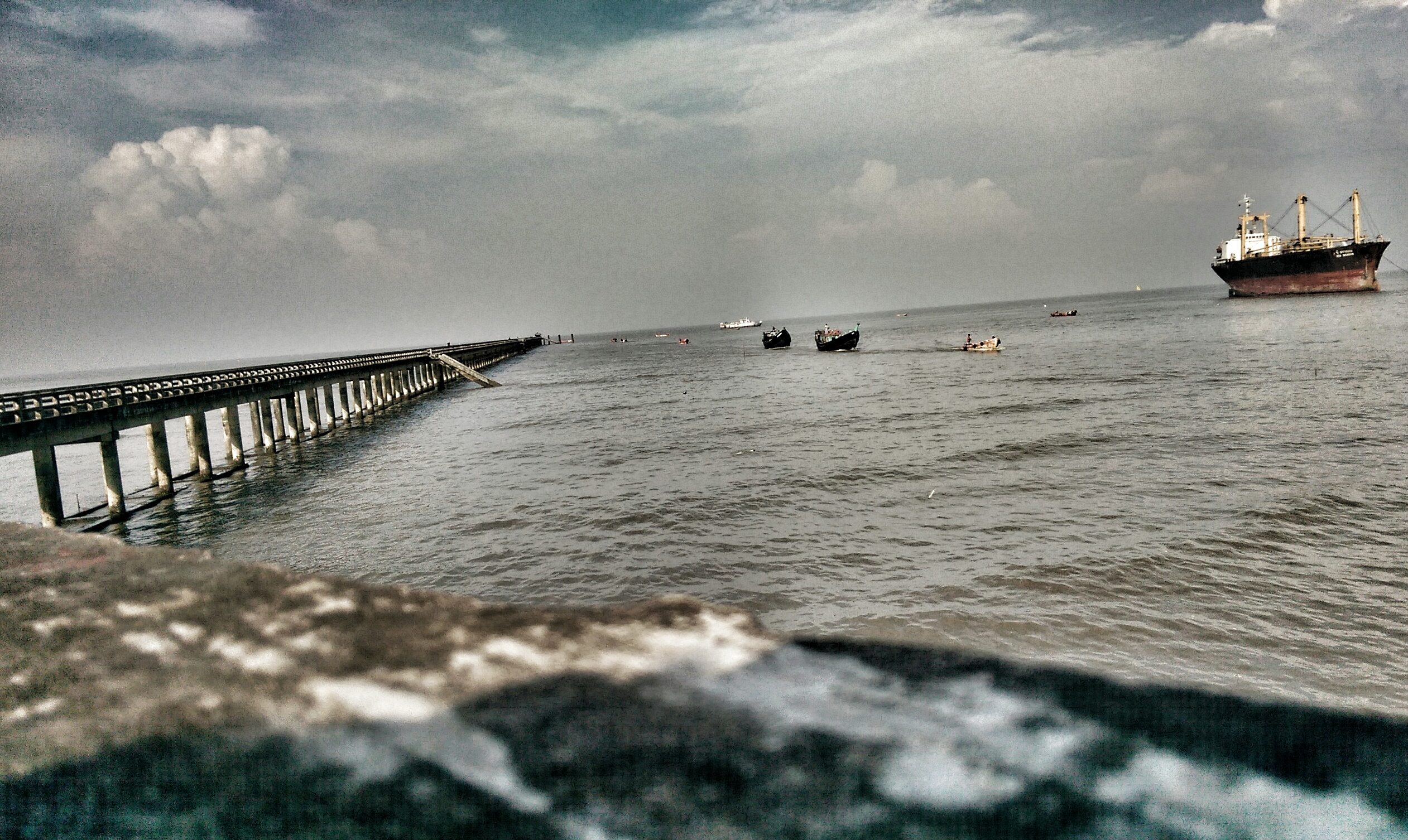
Sandwip Ferry Ghat

== Natural disasters ==
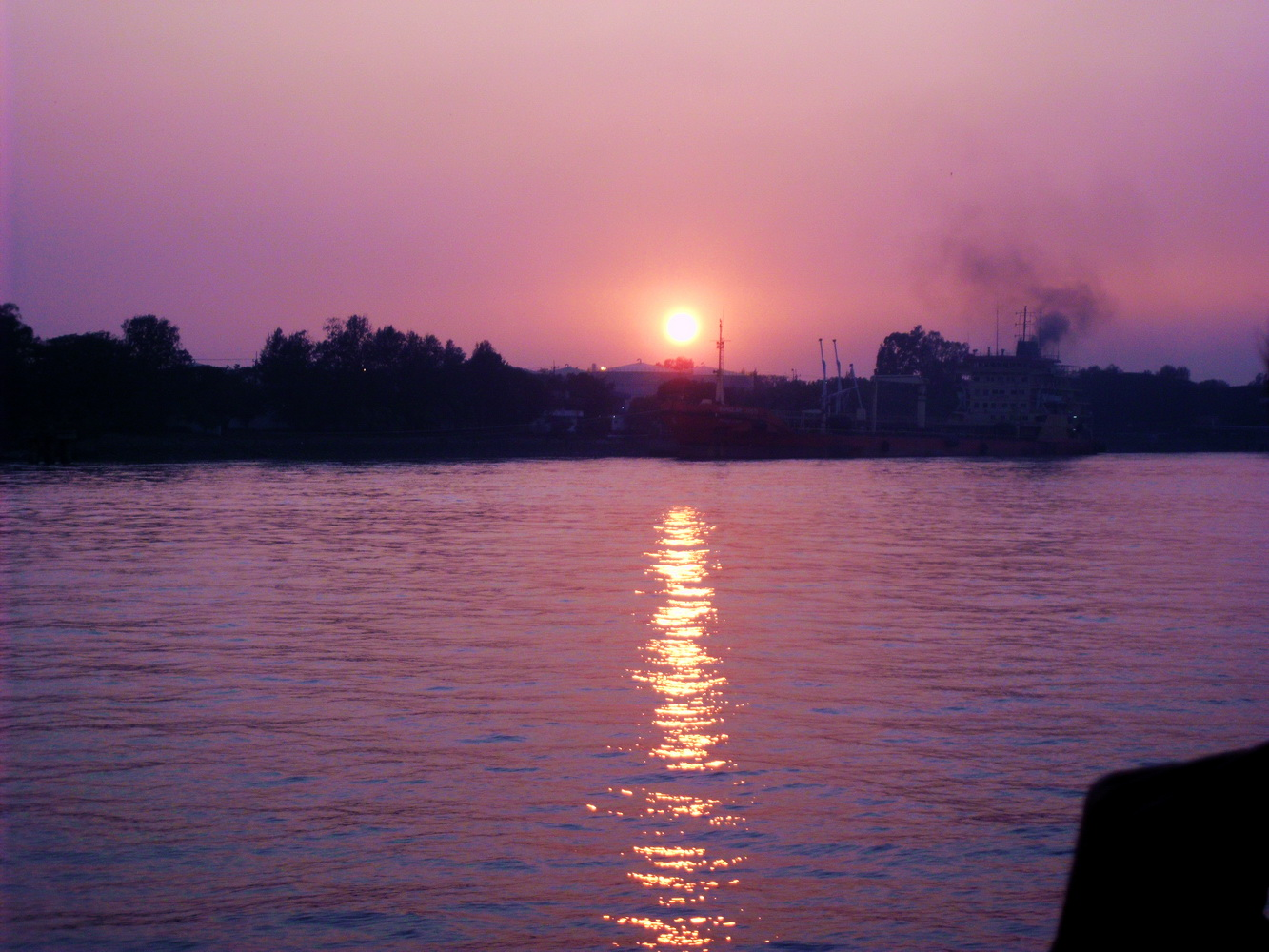
Sunset in Sandwip

The geographical location of Sandwip has made the island more vulnerable to tropical cyclones and storm surges for over 200 years, since nearly 10% of the world's cyclones develop in the Bay of Bengal. In the years 1825, 1876, 1970, 1985, 1991, and 1997, Sandwip was affected by devastating cyclones and tornadoes. On 29 April 1991, a Category 5 cyclone hit the island, causing a death toll of about 40,000 and the destruction of 80% of the island's houses. The velocity of the cyclone was 225 km/h (140 mph). As a result of the 1991 cyclone, the Bangladesh Remote Union Council began to take more enhanced measures to protect residents of the island through wider distribution of storm warning signals, as well as relief and rehabilitation programs led by NGOs such as the Association for Social Advancement to reduce the impact of future natural disasters.

== Climate ==
Climate data for Sandwip (1991–2020, extremes 1966-present)
Month	Jan	Feb	Mar	Apr	May	Jun	Jul	Aug	Sep	Oct	Nov	Dec	Year
Record high °C (°F)	31.0 (87.8)	33.7 (92.7)	37.7 (99.9)	38.9 (102.0)	37.2 (99.0)	39.3 (102.7)	36.5 (97.7)	36.5 (97.7)	36.3 (97.3)	36.0 (96.8)	34.7 (94.5)	33.0 (91.4)	39.3 (102.7)
Mean daily maximum °C (°F)	25.7 (78.3)	28.2 (82.8)	31.0 (87.8)	32.2 (90.0)	32.3 (90.1)	31.4 (88.5)	30.7 (87.3)	31.0 (87.8)	31.5 (88.7)	31.7 (89.1)	29.9 (85.8)	26.8 (80.2)	30.2 (86.4)
Daily mean °C (°F)	19.0 (66.2)	22.1 (71.8)	26.0 (78.8)	28.3 (82.9)	28.9 (84.0)	28.6 (83.5)	28.1 (82.6)	28.4 (83.1)	28.5 (83.3)	27.9 (82.2)	24.5 (76.1)	20.5 (68.9)	25.9 (78.6)
Mean daily minimum °C (°F)	13.5 (56.3)	16.4 (61.5)	21.0 (69.8)	24.2 (75.6)	25.1 (77.2)	25.8 (78.4)	25.5 (77.9)	25.5 (77.9)	25.4 (77.7)	24.3 (75.7)	19.9 (67.8)	15.4 (59.7)	21.8 (71.2)
Record low °C (°F)	7.4 (45.3)	9.0 (48.2)	13.0 (55.4)	17.6 (63.7)	18.6 (65.5)	20.1 (68.2)	22.2 (72.0)	21.0 (69.8)	20.0 (68.0)	18.9 (66.0)	12.6 (54.7)	8.5 (47.3)	7.4 (45.3)
Average precipitation mm (inches)	9 (0.4)	21 (0.8)	66 (2.6)	108 (4.3)	388 (15.3)	713 (28.1)	945 (37.2)	655 (25.8)	491 (19.3)	280 (11.0)	51 (2.0)	6 (0.2)	3,733 (147.0)
Average precipitation days (≥ 1 mm)	1	2	3	6	14	19	23	21	18	10	2	1	120
Average relative humidity (%)	79	77	79	82	84	88	90	89	88	85	82	81	84
Mean monthly sunshine hours	230.9	225.5	245.3	233.6	214.7	172.2	161.8	173.6	178.6	220.8	241.1	229.8	2,527.9
Source 1: NOAA
Source 2: Bangladesh Meteorological Department (humidity 1981-2010)

== Notable people ==
- Chowdhury Abu Torab Khan, leader of Bengal's first anti-British uprising
- Abul Kashem Sandwip, educationist and a founder of Bangladesh Betar
- Abdul Hakim, 17th-century poet
- Abul Fazal Ziaur Rahman, physician and army officer
- AKM Asadul Haq, physician and army officer
- AKM Rafiq Ullah Choudhury, politician and language activist
- Alhaz Mustafizur Rahman, politician
- Belal Muhammad, a founder of Swadhin Bangla Betar Kendra
- Belayet Hossain, Bangladeshi fighter
- Chowdhury Hasan Sarwardy, former lieutenant general of Bangladesh Army
- Dilal Khan, final independent ruler of Sandwip
- M. Obaidul Huq, politician
- Mostafa Kamal Pasha, politician
- Muzaffar Ahmad, politician and journalist; one of the founders of the Communist Party of India
- Master Shahjahan BA, politician
- Rajib Humayun, linguist, playwright and educator
- Shamsuddin Qasemi, Islamic scholar and politician
- Lalmohan Sen, revolutionary involved in the Chittagong armoury raid
- Mohit Kamal, psychotherapist
- Muhammad Fouzul Kabir Khan, economist and adviser to the Interim government of Bangladesh
- Khaled Belal, storyteller and journalist
- Syed Abdul Majid, politician and lawyer

== Gallery ==
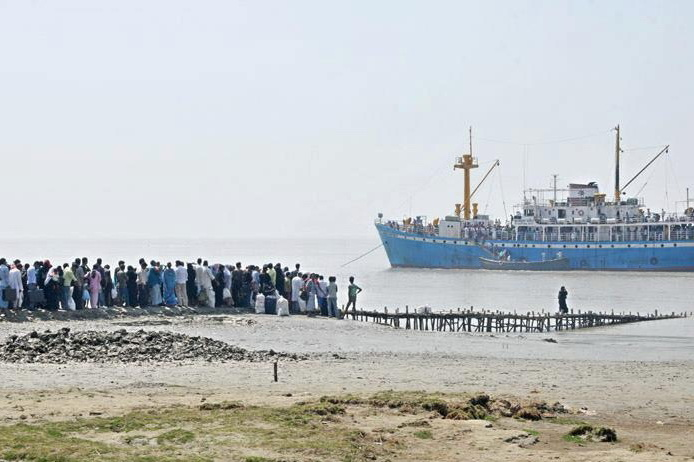
Ships Wharf, Sandwip

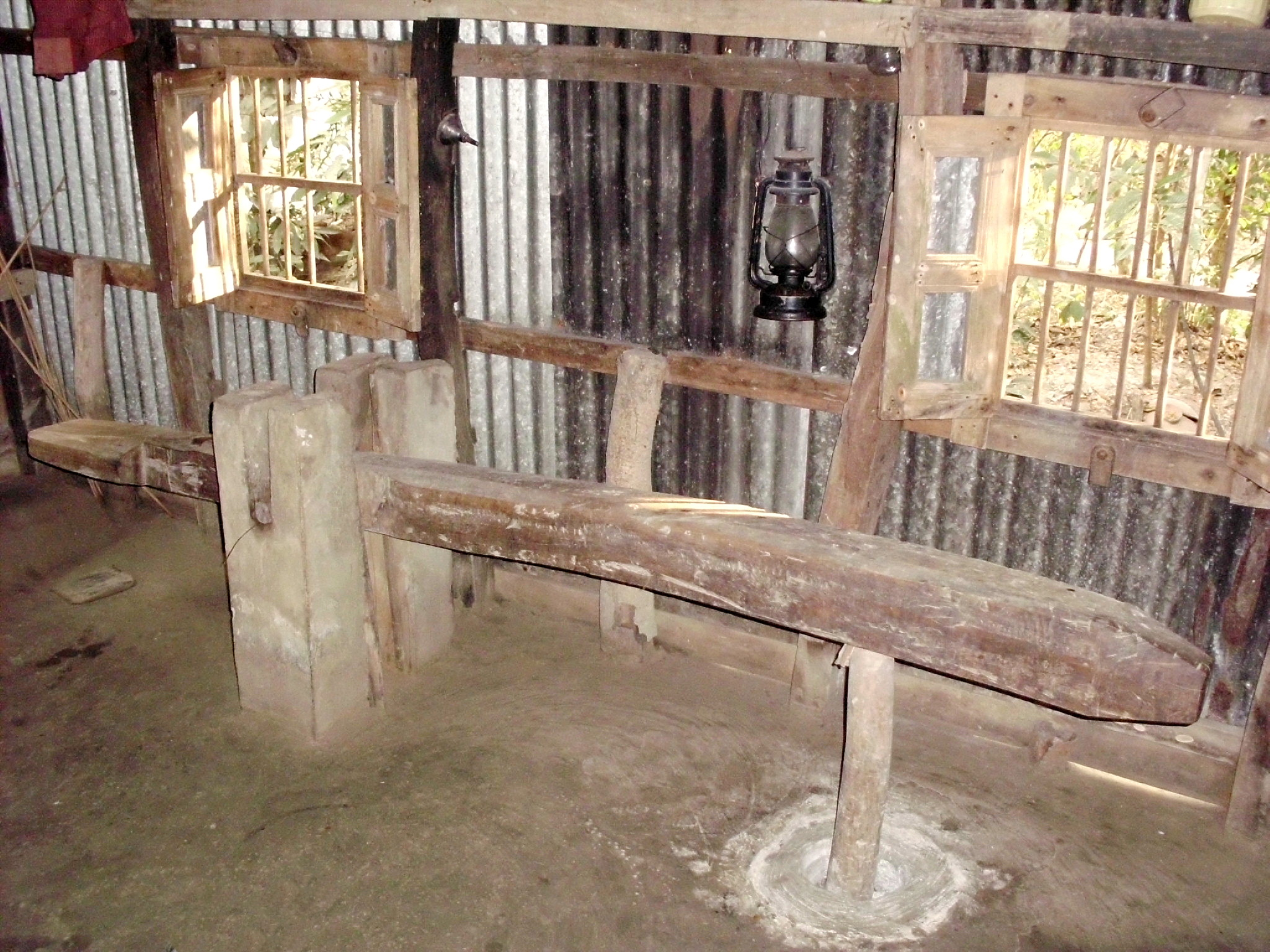
Dheki (husking pedal) once was very common in houses of Sandwip

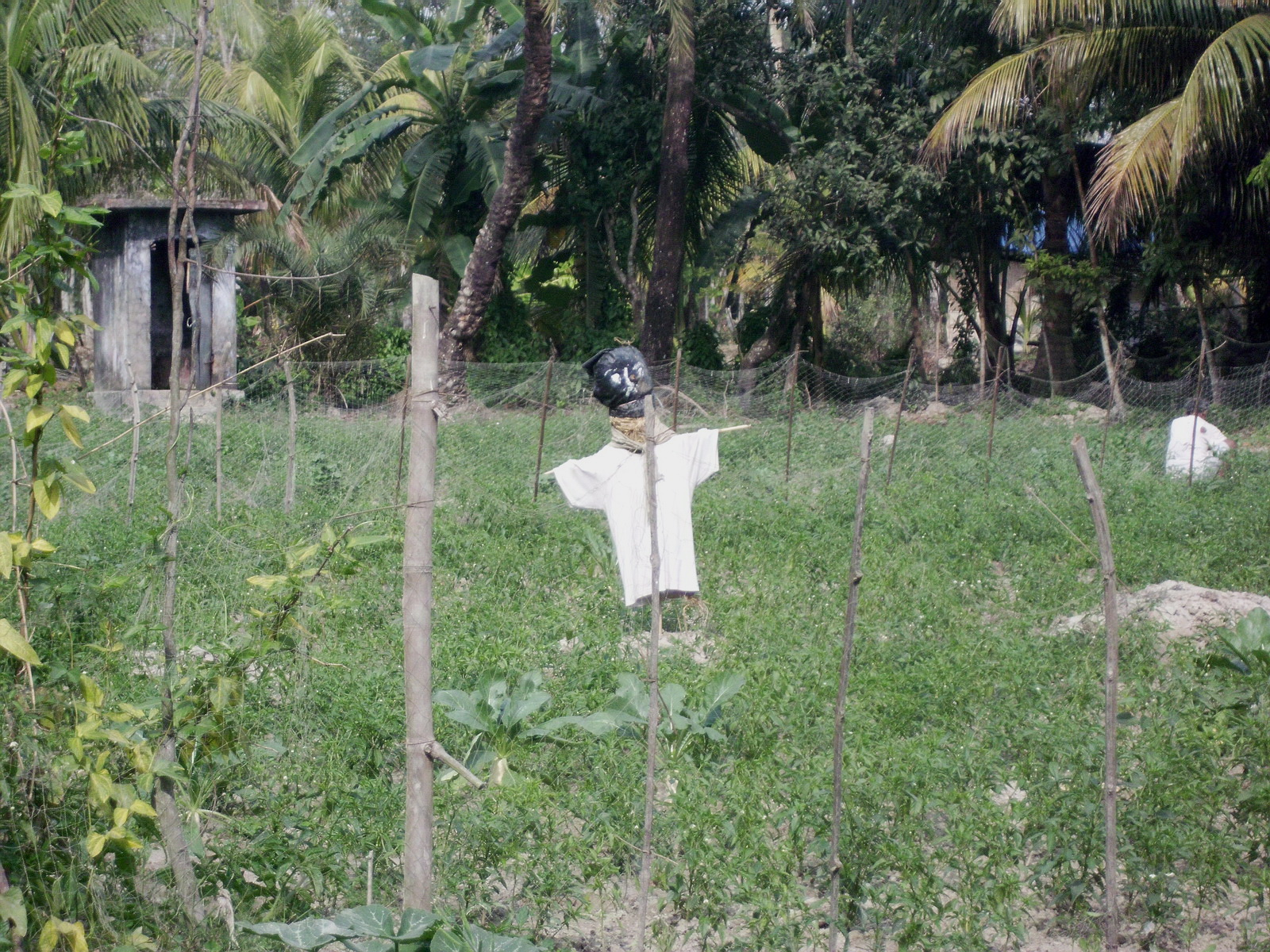
Kakataruya

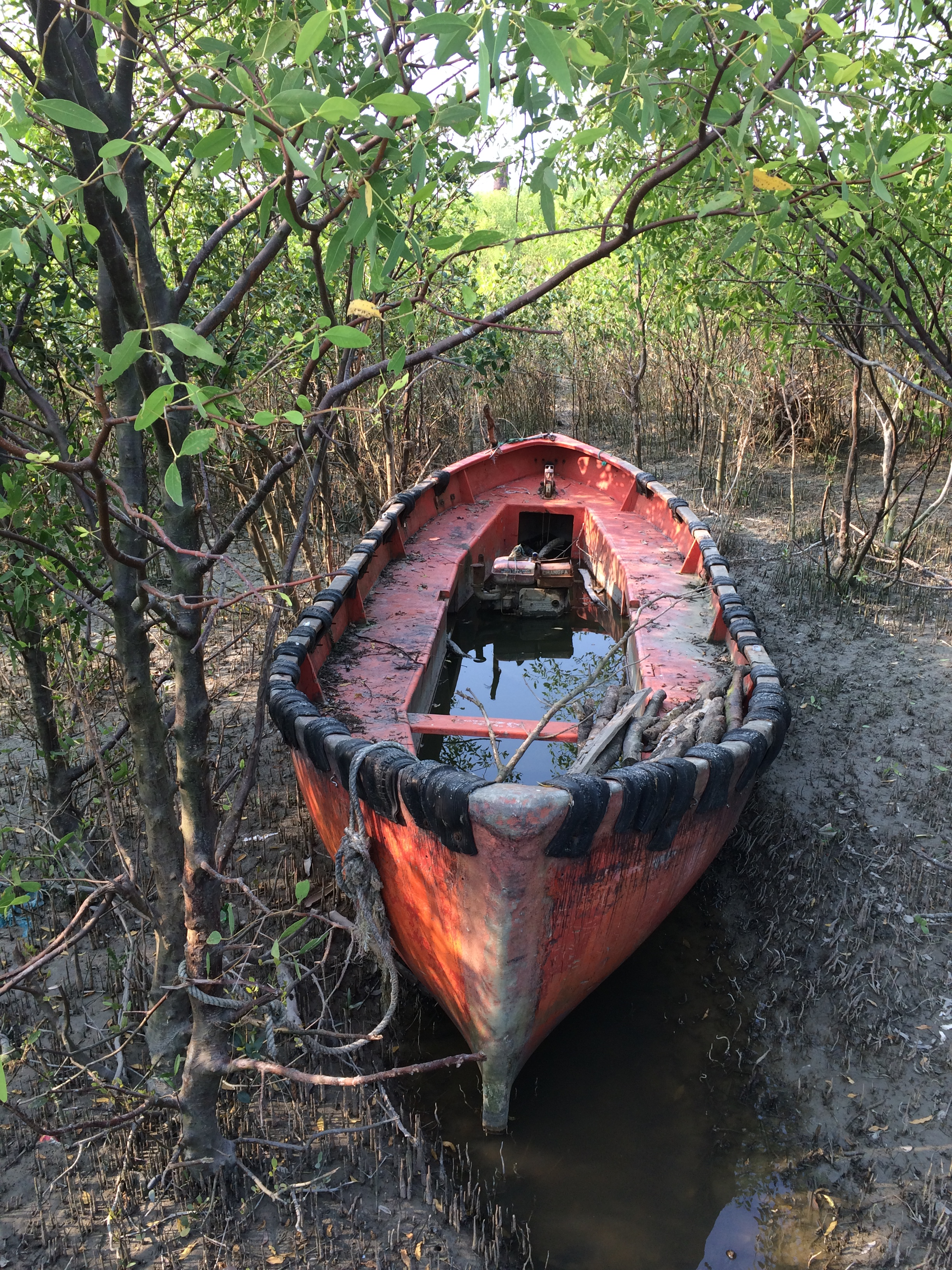

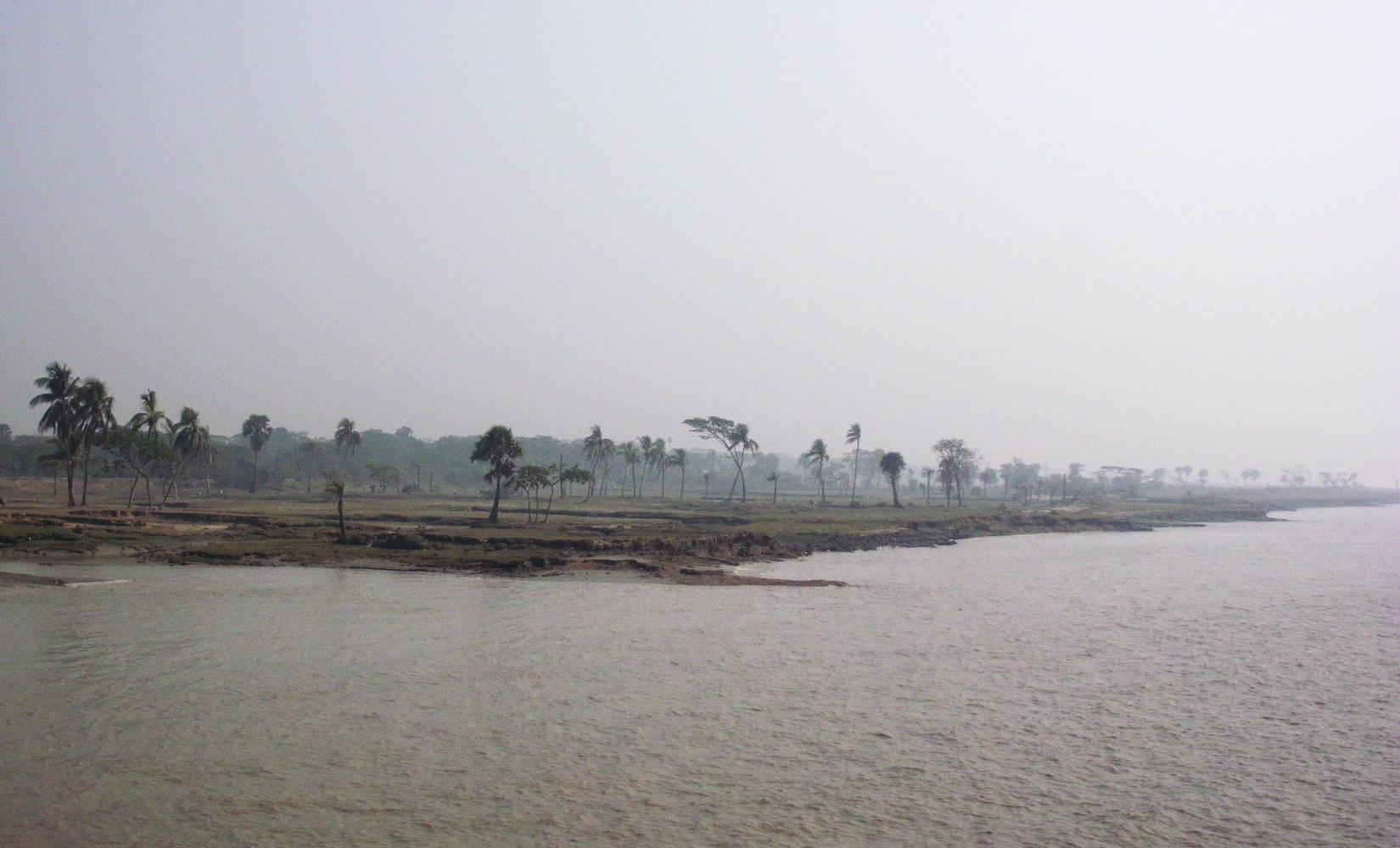

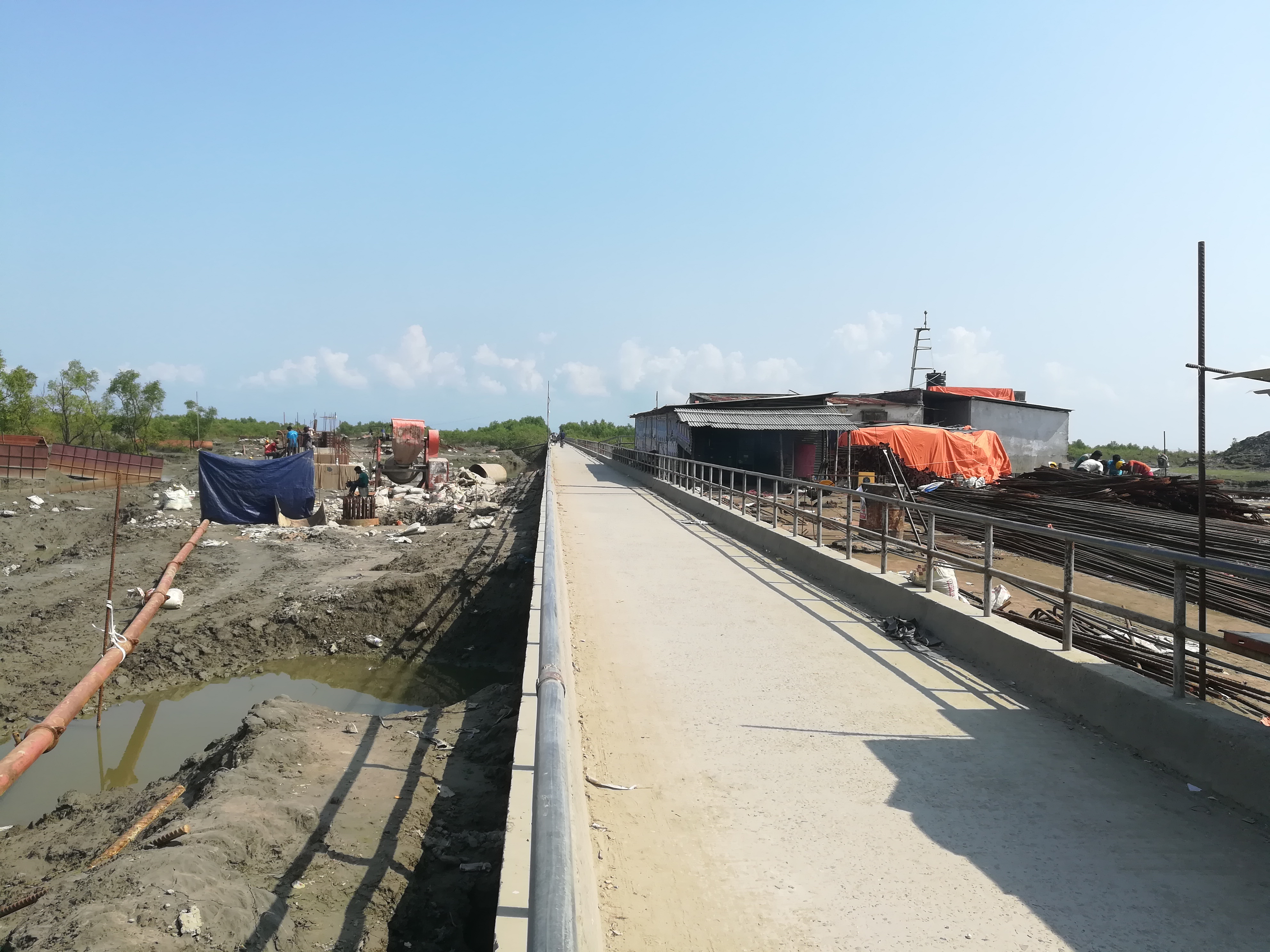

== See also ==
- History of Bangladesh
- List of islands of Bangladesh
