= Abul Fazal Ziaur Rahman =

- Born: 2 February 1926; Araihazar, Bengal, British India
- Died: 23 May 1971 (aged 45); Dhaka Cantonment, Dhaka, Bangladesh
- Education: Dhaka Medical College
- Military career
- Allegiance: Bangladesh; Pakistan (before 1971)
- Branch: Bangladesh Army; Pakistan Army
- Service years: 1949 - 1971
- Rank: Lieutenant Colonel
- Unit: Army Medical Corps
- Known for: Martyred Intellectual
- Conflicts: Bangladesh Liberation War; Operation Searchlight †

Abul Fazal Ziaur Rahman was a physician and army officer who was killed in the Bangladesh Liberation War. He is considered a martyr in Bangladesh.

== Early life ==
Rahman was born in Noagon, Araihazar, Narayanganj, on February 2, 1926. He graduated from Kathghar High School in Sandwip in 1944 and from Chittagong College in 1946. He graduated from Dhaka Medical College after completing his MBBS degree. His father was Mohammad Moslehuddin Bhuya and his mother was Syeda Najimunnesa (also known as Masuma).

== Career ==
Rahman joined the Pakistan Army Medical Corps in 1949. He served at the Combined Military Hospitals in Rangpur and Dhaka. In 1963, he was promoted to lieutenant colonel. In 1968, he was made the superintendent and principal of Sylhet Medical College, and also served as the dean of the Faculty of Medicine from 1969 to 1970. During his tenure, Rahman worked to expand the residential quarters and hostels of the medical school.

== Death ==
In 1971, Rahman was transferred to Islamabad, West Pakistan, but he refused the transfer. The Pakistan Army placed him under house arrest. On 14 April 1971, he was taken from his home by the Pakistan Army and was never seen again. On 14 December 1995, the Bangladesh Post Office issued commemorative stamps in his name on the occasion of Martyred Intellectuals Day.
