= Dilal Khan =

Ruler of Sandwip from c. 1622 to 1666

Dilal Khan দেলোয়ার খাঁ
- Raja

Ruler of Sandwip
- Reign: c. 1622 – 1666
- Successor: Abdul Karim Khan (as Mughal faujdar)
- Born: Dilwar Khan c. 1585; Daca, Bengal Subah, Mughal Empire (now Dhaka, Bangladesh)
- Died: January 1666 (aged 80–81); Jahangirnagar, Bengal Subah, Mughal Empire
- Issue: Musabibi, Maryam Bibi, Sharif Khan among others
- Religion: Sunni Islam

Dilwar Khan (Bengali: দেলোয়ার খাঁ, romanized: Delwar Khan), (Note: Various spellings including দিলোয়ার, দিলওয়ার, দেলওয়ার, Dilar and Dilawar.) popularly known as Raja Dilal (Bengali: দিলাল রাজা, romanized: Dilal Raja), was the last independent ruler of Sandwip, an island in present-day Bangladesh. His reputation as a strong and charitable ruler has made him considered to be the Robin Hood of Southeast Bengal, robbing the rich and rewarding the poor. His legacy remains popular today, and is engraved in local folklore and strange legends in Sandwip. He has been considered the most influential Bengali Muslim ruler of the 17th century.

== Early life ==
There are a number of legends regarding his early life. Some traditions mention that when Dilwar was a baby, he and his mother were shipwrecked and ended up in the beaches of Sandwip, an island famed for Portuguese piracy. These legends mention that a cobra protected him from sunlight during this incident, which suggested that he was destined for a great role.

Other sources like historians Syed Murtaza Ali and Muhammad Abdul Kader claim that his motherland was in Dhaka, which somewhat explains how he found employment in the Mughal naval services there. Also, famous historian Sir Jadunath Sarker referred him as "a run-away captain of the Mughal navy" who had established himself as a king

== Rule ==
As piracy was prevalent in the island for many decades, many people ruled over it before the Kingdom of Mrauk U took over after defeating the Portuguese pirate Sebastian Gonzales Tibao. Dilwar was employed by the Mughal Army as a naval commander in Dhaka, during the reign of Mughal emperor Jahangir and governorship of Subahdar Ibrahim Khan Fath-i-Jang. Dilwar secretly resigned from his Mughal duties to take over Sandwip where he began ruling independently with his family and own private army. According to Syed Murtaza Ali, Dilwar did this by playing the Mughal army against Arakan, allowing him to rule peacefully. It is unknown why Dilwar resigned from a seemingly stable job and chose a dangerous independent lifestyle. His reign lasted for roughly 50 years, and began between 1618 and 1622. Dilwar's son, Sharif Khan, was made a mansabdar of 500 soldiers by the Mughals.

Samuel Purchas, a European traveler to Sandwip, mentions that majority of citizens were Muslims but that the minority Hindu population was treated fairly by Dilwar too. Dilwar's judicial system was described to have been unique. One of his laws were that both parties should stand in the same spot after they quarrelled and could only leave the spot after Dilwar's arrival and judgement. It is said that Dilwar did not even hesitate to take action against his relatives if necessary. Dilwar also disregarded the caste system in Hinduism.

In the matter of defence of the Island from the enemies or military tactics, Dilal had a merit of no mean order. The only road to Sundeep lay through creek which separates the Island from the mainland It was shallow and very narrow and the tidal waves or bores which comes twice a day in mountain-like waves with thundering noise, pass through it and make it dangerous for navigation. No boat can stand in it for more than three or four hours a day, through fear of this bores. On the mouth of this channel he erected a fort from which a few gunners could obstruct the path of or annihilate thousand of enemies. His house in the interior of the island, was a fort, surrounded with ditch and thick jungles behind.

In 1629, Thiri Thudhamma, the King of Arakan, realised that Dilwar was not willing to accept his subjugation and so sent troops on a flotilla to deal with him. Dilwar immediately ordered his soldiers to sit quietly in the creek at the entrance of the Sandwip island. Entering through the creek, the Maghs began to get off their boats with no fear, and making way towards Dilwar's residence. At that moment, Dilwar's troops came out to attack the Maghs and the fort soldiers also began firing at them. Many Maghs were killed or captured though some escaped with their broken boats. The area in which this battle took place thereafter came to be known as Magdhara which means Maghs captured in the Bengali language. Sandwip was a relatively peaceful island since then, and Dilwar fortified the entire island so that it could not be captured by enemies.

== Defeat ==
On 18 November 1665, Shaista Khan, the Mughal governor of Bengal, sent Abul Hasan to lead a conquest to Sandwip and defeat Dilwar who was 80-years old at the time. They also had the support of the Dutch military. The Arakanese had fallen out with the Portuguese, which led to the Portuguese also assisting the Mughals. Sharif Khan defended Sandwip very well but was later wounded, leading to his defeat. The Mughal army then continued on to Dilwar's house where another battle took place. Dilwar offered a stubborn resistance but was forced to surrender after being enclosed by the Mughal horsemen. By 26 January 1666, the conquest was successful and the Chief Captain of the European pirates was rewarded. Dilwar, Sharif and 92 associates were successively locked up in an iron cage in Jahangir Nagar where Dilwar died a few days later. George Abraham Grierson claims that they were locked up in Murshidabad, though Abdul Kader refuted this claim as the latter was only founded and made Bengal's capital by Murshid Quli Khan in the early 18th century. Famous historians like Ghulam Husain Salim, Jadunath Sarkar, Professor Mohammad Mohor Ali, Suniti Bhushan Qanungo and Maulvi M. Abdul Halim claimed that Dilwar was captured and sent to Jahangirnagar (Dacca, currently Dhaka) under the charge of Zaminder Monawwar Khan and subsequently he died in prison there. Abdul Karim Khan was successively appointed as the Mughal faujdar (military governor) of Sandwip in 1666.

== Legacy ==
Dilwar had many sons and two daughters; Musabibi and Maryam Bibi respectively. Among his sons, only the name of Sharif Khan is known. As a means of compensation, Shaista Khan granted Dilal's younger sons a jagir of 10–12 villages on the banks of the Dhaleshwari River in an area known as Patharghata-Mithapukur near Dhaka. These villages were destroyed due to fluvial erosion two hundred years later. The family then relocated to the village of Ganda in Savar.

The descendants of Dilal's daughters remained in Sandwip. The older daughter, Musabibi, married Chand Khan and Maryam Bibi married Mulish Khan. Musapur and Musabibi's reservoir remain notable locations in Sandwip. Chand Khan and Musabibi had four children; Junud Khan, Muqim Khan, Surullah Khan and Nurullah Khan. Junud Khan's son was Muhammad Raja, who was the father of Chowdhury Abu Torab Khan and Phulbibi. Muqim Khan's son was Muhammad Husayn, the father of Muhammad Murad. Phulbibi and Muhammad Murad married each other and had a son named Muhammad Hanif, who became a prominent zamindar. Abu Torab had a palace in Harishpur, and was also the leader of Bengal's first anti-British peasant rebellion in 1767. Dilal Raja's family and governance are linked to some historical figures like Mohabbat Kha, Azam Kha, Qutub Kha, etc. Some of them served in Dilal Raja's army and managed the Zamindari
