= Mughal–Mrauk U Wars =

Wars between the Mughals and Mrauk U Kingdom (1602–1666)

- Part of Mughal conquest of Bengal
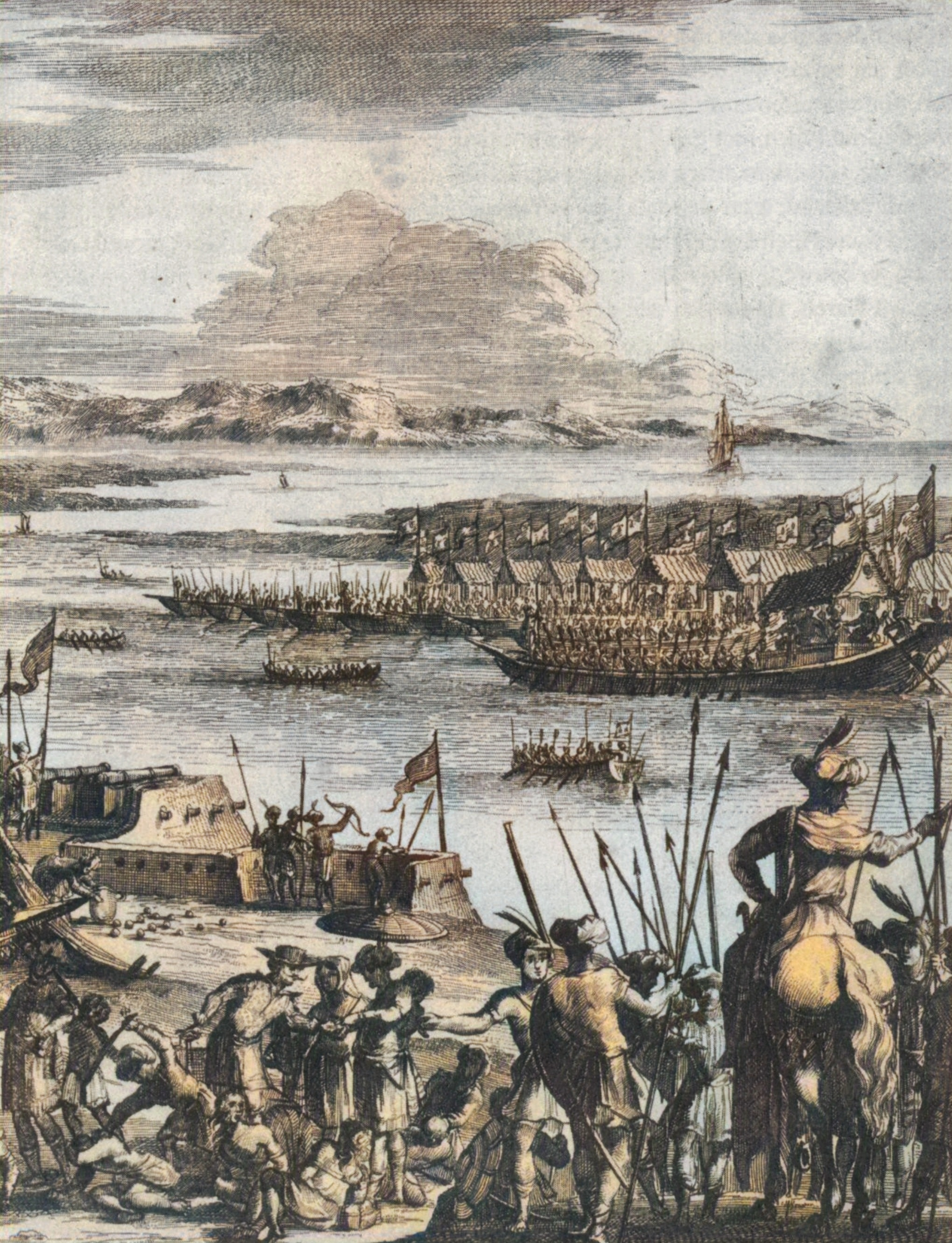
- Arakanese jelias at sea near Pipli with the Mughal governor on horseback inspecting the city’s defences. From Wouter Schouten's Oost-Indische Voyagie
Date	1602–1666 (64 years)
Location	Bengal Subah
Result	Mughal victory
Territorial changes	Sandwip and Chittagong annexed by Mughal Empire

Belligerents
Mughal Empire; Supported by: Portuguese pirates	Kingdom of Mrauk U Supported by: Baro-Bhuyan; Portuguese pirates	Sandwip

Commanders and leaders
Jahangir; Shah Jahan; Aurangzeb List: Man Singh I; Islam Khan I; Qasim Khan; Ibrahim Khan Fath-i-Jang; Qasim Khan Juvayni; Islam Khan II; Shah Shuja; Shaista Khan; Abdul Wahid; Shaikh Yusuf; Mirza Nur-ud-din; Shaikh Ashraf Hansiwal; Shaikh Kamal; Mirza Makki; Abd-un-Nabi; Mirza Isfandiyar; Tatar Khan Miwati; Shaikh Qutb; Shaikh Qasim; Shaikh Afzal; Mirza Saqi; Mirza Baqi; Jamal Khan; Dawran Khan; Mirza Beg; Ima Qa’an; Tufan Bahadur; Mirza Ahmad Beg; Mirza Yusuf; Mirza Nurullah; Mulla Murshid; Hakim Haidar; Musa Khan (from 1610); Raja Raghunath; Buzurg Umed Khan; Ibn Husain; Farhad Khan; Mir Murtaza; Munawwar Khan; Cakrawate; Nga Tun Khin Sebastião Gonçalves Tibau; Moore (in 1665)	Min Razagyi; Min Khamaung; Thiri Thudhamma; Narapati; Thadao; Sanda Thudhamma; Fateh Khan Baro-Bhuyan: Khwaja Usman; Musa Khan (until 1610); Kedar Rai Portuguese: Domingos Carvalho X Manuel de Mattos; Sebastião Gonçalves Tibau (AWOL) (1614–1615); Antonio Carvalho; Diogo de Sá; Pieter Cocqu	Dilal Khan; Moore (till 1665)

Strength
1612: Unknown; 1614: Unknown; 1615: 2,000 cavalry 3,000 musketeers 700 war-boats 100 elephants 1617: 5,000 cavalry 5,000 musketeers 200 elephants 1,000 boats 1620: 7000/8000 cavalry 4,000–5,000 boats 1621: 2,000 war-boats 40,000 cavalry and infantry 1,000 elephants 1624: 700 cavalry 300 boats 1643: 75 boats 1666: 6,500 troops 288 boats 40 war-ships (Note: Under the Portuguese)	1612: 300 boats 1614: 300,000; 1615: Unknown 1617: Kathgar: 100,000 infantry 1,000 war-boats 400 elephants; Chittagong: 300,000 infantry 10,000 cavalry; 1620: 700 batteries 4,000 boats 1621: Unknown; 1624: Unknown; 1638: 200 boats 1664: 60–70 vessels 1666: 10 ghurabs 45 jalias	Unknown

Casualties and losses
1643: 70 boats destroyed	1614: 500 killed 1615: 500 killed 1,000 wounded 1620: 4,000 boats captured 1666: 135 boats captured	Unknown
- Thousands of inhabitants killed and enslaved by the Arakanese and Portuguese pirates.

The Mughal–Mrauk U Wars also known as the Mughal–Arakan Wars were a series of conflicts fought between the Mughal Empire and the Kingdom of Mrauk U from 1602 to 1666, primarily over control of Chittagong, Sandwip, and south-eastern Bengal. The wars involved shifting alliances with local zamindars i.e. Baro-Bhuyas, Portuguese mercenaries, and Afghan warlords, and were marked by naval raids, sieges, and large-scale plundering expeditions. The conflicts began with Arakanese raids and attempts to seize Sandwip in 1602, followed by repeated Mughal attempts to capture Chittagong. Key events included the Arakanese sack of Dhaka in 1626, several failed Mughal invasions of Chittagong in 1617 and 1621, and major Arakanese raids deep into Bengal. Despite occasional Arakanese successes and strong influence in areas like Hijli and Jessore, the Mughals gradually gained the upper hand. The wars culminated in the Mughal conquest of Chittagong in 1666 under Shaista Khan, which permanently ended Arakanese power in Bengal and contributed to the later decline of the Mrauk U kingdom.

== Background ==
In 1602, the Khwaja Usman crossed the Brahmaputra River and besieged the Mughal thana of Bhalwa (Bhawal). Bengal's Subahdar Raja Man Singh marched to recover the post and defeated Usman. Man Singh then advanced to Dhaka, and in February 1602 sent forces across the Ichamati River against Musa Khan and Kedar Rai. The Mughals effectively drove Musa Khan and his allies back to Sonargaon. At the same time, Domingos Carvalho in the service of Kedar Rai and Manuel de Mattos recaptured Sandwip from the Mughals. This prompted Raja Man Singh to move against the island. The Arakanese king, Min Razagyi, attempted to seize Sandwip with Kedar Rai's help. In November 1602, the Arakanese fleet defeated Manuel de Mattos on 8 November, but two days later Domingos Carvalho arrived with reinforcements from Sandwip and the Portuguese defeated the Arakanese on 10 November. Portuguese takeover of Sandwip was seen as an open rebellion by Min Razagyi. In March 1603, Min Razagyi launched a second attack on Sandwip, severely damaging the Portuguese positions. The Portuguese were forced to abandon the island and flee to the Bengal mainland, taking refuge in Sripur, Bakla, and Chandecan with the Bharo-Bhuyans. Min Razagyi allied with Kedar Rai, who hired Domingos Carvalho against the Mughals. Carvalho fled to Raja Pratapaditya of Chandecan, but Pratapaditya killed him to ally with Min Razagyi. In 1605, peace was concluded between Manuel Mattos and Min Razagyi. In Bengal, the Mughal and Arakanese invasions prompted the Baro Bhuiyas to form a coalition against their domination. However, the group was not homogeneous; local lords, Afghans, and Portuguese frequently shifted allegiances to exploit the instability. In 1609, Raja Srijit, the zamindar of Bhushna was subdued by the Mughals. The occupation of Bhushna and the expanding Arakanese power from Chittagong under Man Razagyi brought the armies of the two rivals now directly confronted each other for control of south-eastern Bengal.

== Early conflicts ==
=== Arakanese raids in 1602–1604 ===
After the Arakanese forces attacked Sandwip in 1602, Min Razagyi raided areas near Sonargaon and Dhaka. These battles in 1603 battles marked the first major direct confrontation between Mughal and Arakanese armies. The Arakanese likely captured the fort at Trimohani near Dhaka but were repulsed in a subsequent land battle. Later that year, the Arakanese joined forces with Kedar Rai and advanced on the Mughal thana of Srinagar. In a battle near Bikrampur, the Mughal forces defeated the coalition. Kedar Rai was captured and later died of his wounds. The Portuguese serving under him also suffered heavy losses. With Kedar Rai dead and the Arakanese established at Sandwip, Min Razagyi emerged as the dominant power in eastern Bengal and the chief rival to Mughal governor Raja Man Singh. Following the Battle of Bikrampur, Man Singh left his base at Bhawal in early 1604 to confront the Arakanese who retreated upon Mughal advance.

=== Tibau's capture of Sandwip ===
Sebastião Gonçalves Tibau, arrived in Bengal after escaping the Dianga massacre in 1607. Tibau and a group of Portuguese refugees sought shelter with the raja of Bakla, one of the Baro Bhuiyas. From this base, they wrested control of Sandwip from the Afghan warlord Fateh Khan, who held the island as a fief under the Mrauk U kingdom. By around 1609, Tibau had established himself as the autonomous ruler of Sandwip. During his short-lived reign, Tibau extended his influence on the neighbouring islands of Dakhin Shahbazpur and Patelbanga, seizing them from his former ally, the raja of Bakla. He operated as a local warlord and trader, frequently shifting his allegiance between the Mughal Empire and the Mrauk U kingdom while managing a profitable, albeit brief, enterprise.

=== Cakrawate's alliance with the Mughals ===
From 1610, three sons of Min Razgyi, Min Nyo, Cakrawate, and Min Khamaung fought a bitter three-year succession war. Min Nyo was driven out of Chittagong by Min Khamaung and died on Sandwip in 1611. He was succeeded as "king of the west” by Cakrawate. Cakrawate sent envoys to the Mughal governor Islam Khan, offering to restrain Tibau and accept Sandwip as a Mughal jagir in exchange for recognition. However, Musa Khan, still dominant in the Brahmaputra delta, blocked Cakrawate's route to Dhaka and prevented his formal submission. This failed alliance significantly weakened the Arakanese position in the subsequent struggle for Bhulua.

=== Mughal conquest of Bhulua ===
In 1611, after defeating Musa Khan, Islam Khan dispatched Haji Shamsuddin Baghdadi to occupy Bhulua. Raja Ananta Manik of Bhulua received immediate help from the Min Razagyi. The Mughals persuaded Ananta Manikya's chief minister to defect. The Arakanese retreated without fighting. Cakrawate and Tibao had possibly sent Mughals help.

=== Arakanese raids in 1612 ===
Next year, Arakanese made double raid into Bengal Subah. Taking advantage of the withdrawal of Mughal garrisons from the frontier of Sripur and Bikrampur in the south and Bhulua in the east, the Arakanese launched near-simultaneous attacks on both areas. Shaikh Yusuf, thanadar of Sripur-Bikrampur, and Abdul Wahid, thanahdar of Bhulua, were unable to mount effective resistance due to their limited troops and shortage of war-boats. The Arakanese descended on Sripur with 300 war-boats, plundering and burning numerous villages and carrying away a large number of captives. Bhulua suffered the same fate. Islam Khan hurriedly dispatched a relieving force under Shaikh Ashraf Hansiwal and Mirza Nur-ud-din to Sripur and Bikrampur, but it arrived only after the raiders had withdrawn. The Arakanese also hastily retreated from Bhulua, leaving behind widespread desolation and distress.

The death of Min Ragazyi in 1612 marked the final phase of the Arakanese succession war between Man Khamaung and Cakrawate. Min Khamaung to emerge victorious with Cakrawate dying during the war.

== Mrauk U invasion of Bhulua ==
In 1614, Min Khamaung, allied with the Portuguese freebooter Sebastião Gonçalves Tibau of Sandwip and invaded Mughal Bhulua. The Arakanese land army under Min Khamaung had a total strength of 300,000. The combined fleet under Tibau comprised 200 boats manned by 4,000 sailors. The Mughal thanadar of Bhulua, Abdul Wahid, abandoned the position without resistance. The Arakanese and Portuguese forces occupied Bhulua unopposed, crossed the Feni River, and plundered inland, while the fleet advanced up the Meghna to the Dakatia River, ravaging both banks. The alliance soon collapsed when Min Khamaung treacherously imprisoned Portuguese officers, including Antonio Carvalho's nephew. In retaliation, Tibau's men attacked the Arakanese fleet, murdered their naval commanders, seized many boats, and withdrew to Sandwip. Isolated, the Arakanese were defeated by Mughal forces under Abdul Wahid, Shaikh Kamal, and Mirza Makki, who assaulted their fort after crossing the Dakatia canal. The Arakanese fled back to Chittagong, ending the December 1614 invasion in complete failure. In October 1615, after making peace with the Burmese king Maha Dhamma Raja, Min Khamaung renewed the assault on Bhulua. Abdul Wahid again evacuated the area. Mughal reinforcements under Abd-un-Nabi with 2,000 cavalry, 3,000 musketeers, 700 war-boats, and 100 elephants arrived and trapped the Arakanese in a large bog. Min Khamaung himself became mired in the swamp. In the ensuing clash, about 500 Arakanese were killed and roughly 1,000 fled wounded. The king sued for peace, which was accepted in exchange for the surrender of Arakanese officers, troops, and war equipment.

The treacherous acts of Tibau enraged Min Khamaung that he ordered to impale Tibau's nephew who was imprisoned previously. The Arakanese decided to crush the Portuguese sovereignty ambitions in south-eastern Bengal through naval battles on the Kaladan and Sandwip. In January 1616, Man Khamaung, aided by the Dutch, defeated Tibau's remaining forces on Sandwip after a two‑day battle, driving him from the island forever. They now held Chittagong's and dominated Sandwip, while the Mughals steadily expanded across western Bengal in their protracted struggle with local zamindars. After eviction of Tibau from Sandwip, Min Khamaung received a fruitless embassy from the Mughals.

== Siege of Chittagong (1617) ==
Early in 1617, Qasim Khan launched a Mughal invasion of Arakan aimed at Chittagong. From Bhulua, he sent the vanguard under Abd-un-Nabi with 5,000 cavalry, 5,000 matchlockmen, 200 elephants, and 1,000 boats, while he followed with the main army and encamped at the Feni River. Min Khamaung responded by dispatching his commandant with 100,000 infantry, 1,000 war-boats, and 400 elephants to occupy the unfinished fort at Kathgar near Sitakunda, Chittagong. The Arakanese king himself marched from Mrauk-U with a massive force of 300,000 infantry, 10,000 cavalry, and a large fleet of war-boats to defend Chittagong. Abd-un-Nabi advanced rapidly to seize the incomplete Kathgar fort. Sarhad Khan and Shaikh Kamal reached the site first via a shortcut and launched an immediate assault. Although the Mughals nearly captured the fort by evening, Abd-un-Nabi was persuaded to halt the attack overnight. By morning the Arakanese had strengthened their defences, forcing the Mughals into a prolonged siege. The Arakanese then built a strong stockade that cut off Mughal supply lines between Kathgar and the main camp at the Feni River. The besiegers soon suffered severe food shortages. With the monsoon approaching, the Mughals abandoned the siege, retreated to Bhulua, and destroyed their heavy artillery along with about 500 maunds of gunpowder to prevent it falling into Arakanese hands.

== Mughal–Mrauk U War (1620–1621) ==
=== Raid in Dhaka (1620) ===
During the viceroyalty of Ibrahim Khan (1617–1623) the Min Khamaung launched another expedition into Bengal. In 1620, he advanced to the island of Baghchar near Dhaka, intent on attacking the Mughal capital. As soon as news of the raids reached Ibrahim Khan at night, he hastily gathered the 32 war-boats available and set out during the last watch, arriving near the enemy camp by morning with a small personal retinue that included his nephews Mirza Ahmad Beg and Mirza Yusuf. The remaining mansabdars and Bengal zamindars among them Musa Khan and Raja Baghunath later joined him with the land forces, numbering 7,000–8,000 cavalry, and additional war-boats, raising the fleet's strength to between 4,000 and 5,000. Prompt and decisive action by the subahdar, particularly his personal courage and initiative, averted disaster. The Arakan king, unwilling to advance further or risk a naval battle, retreated in haste, leaving 1,000 or 2,000 jaliya boats to guard his frontier. Ibrahim Khan then reinforced the frontier forts with additional garrisons, stationed part of the fleet to protect the pargana of Phuldubi in Faridpur, and returned to Jahangirnagar in October 1620. Ibrahim Khan captured 4,000 of their war-boats.

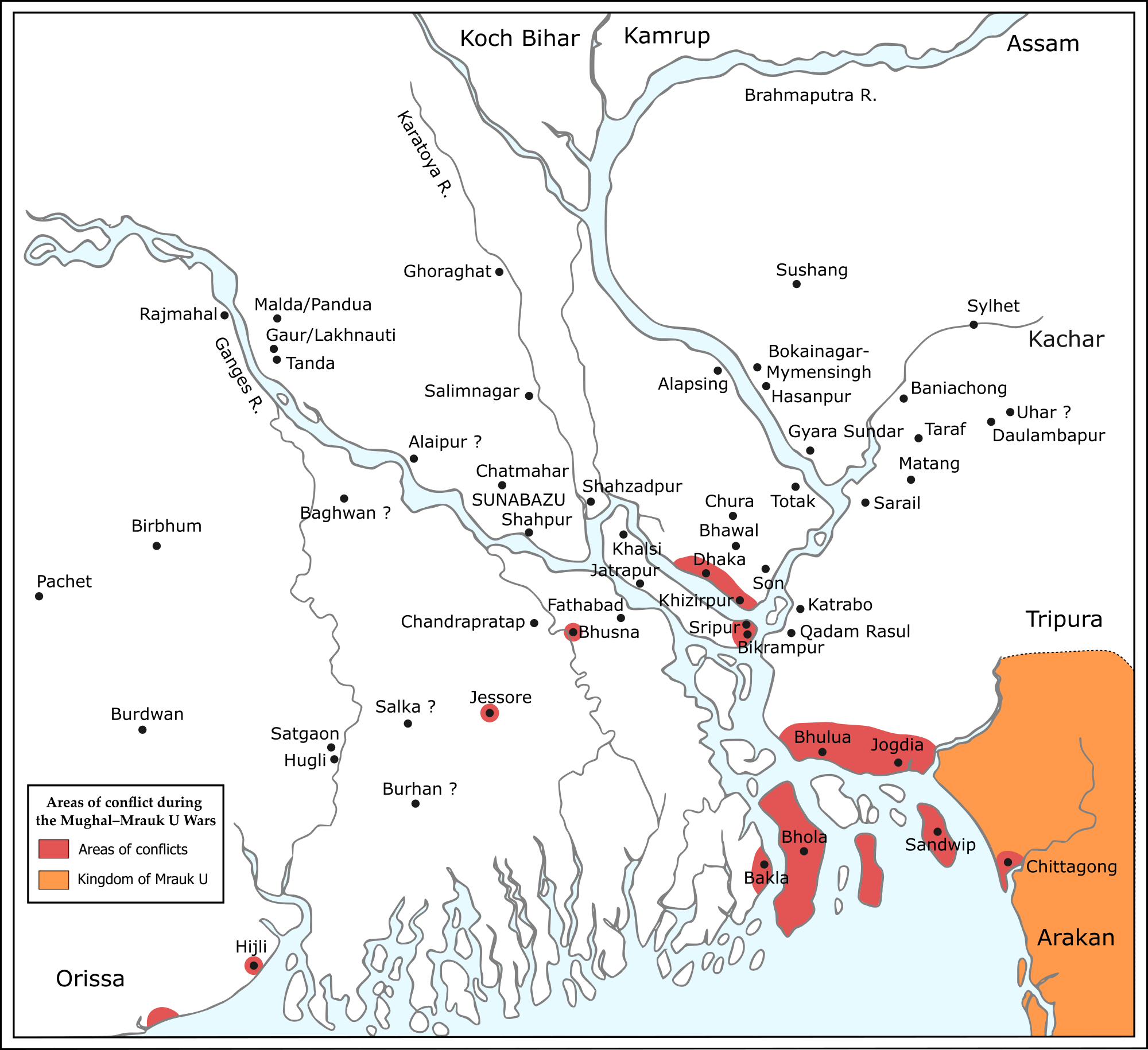
Areas of conflicts during the Mughal–Mrauk U Wars

=== Siege of Chittagong (1621) ===
After the conquest of Tripura, Ibrahim Khan turned his ambition toward Arakan. In March 1621, the Mughals launched a second attempt to capture Chittagong, following a new overland route proposed by Mirza Nurullah, thanadar of Udaipur, with Tripura guides offering passage. Ibrahim Khan personally commanded the expedition after two years of preparation, assembling a formidable force: 2,000 war-boats, 40,000 cavalry and infantry, 1,000 elephants, and heavy siege equipment, with supplies stockpiled at Bhulua. Advancing from the Feni River into the jungles along the Chittagong–Tripura border, the army soon faltered. Boats were abandoned, cavalry immobilized, and elephants struggled in the dense terrain. Cut off from provisions and unable to engage the Arakanese, Ibrahim Khan ordered a retreat. The campaign collapsed not from enemy attack but from the insurmountable jungle and logistical strain.

=== Raid in Jessore and Hijli (1621) ===
Following the second failed Mughal attempt to capture Chittagong, the Arakanese launched raids deep into Mughal Bengal, advancing as far as Jessore. Mughal forces were unable to halt their progress effectively. The campaign was likely aided by the 1621 revolt of Bahadur Khan, zamindar of Hijli. Contemporary accounts, including those of Mirza Nathan, record that the Arakanese supported by their Portuguese allies conducted daily raids and carried off around 1,500 men and women as captives. Soon after Ibrahim Khan suppressed Bahadur Khan's rebellion, news reached Dhaka that an Arakanese fleet had arrived at the island of Dakhin Shahbazpur around August 1621. The Mughals had assembled a large fleet of 4,000–5,000 armed boats at Dhaka in response. The Arakanese withdrew hastily upon learning that their homeland was under attack by the Burmese. Ibrahim Khan then left a flotilla of 600 war-boats to patrol the Meghna River.

==== Hijli under Mrauk U suzerainty ====
Arakanese influence in Hijli remained strong for decades. Bahadur Khan, the zamindar of Hijli, paid annual tribute to the Arakanese king at least until 1644. Shah Shuja briefly brought it back under Mughal control around 1655–59. After Mrauk U's renewal of alliance with Portuguese, in 1656, the Mughal faujdar of Hooghly, Ahmed Beg offered annual tribute to King Candasudhammaraja (r. 1652–1684) to keep Arakanese fleets away, showing the practice continued from earlier years.

During Min Khamaung's reign, Arakanese forces extended their control towards Hijli and stopped the Mughals at Bhulua. Mughals held Bhulua at Feni River, but much of south-eastern Bengal stayed contested, with Arakanese influence in Jessore and Hijli. Mughals built forts near Dhaka and Hooghly. His successor, Thiri Thudhamma (r. 1622–1638) continued wars against Mughals.

== Sack of Dhaka (1626) ==
After Min Khamaung died in 1622, his son Thiri Thudhamma continued Bengal's troubles with a hostile policy. In May 1624, he sent an embassy to Shah Jahan who rebelled against Jahangir in 1623 and occupied Odisha and Bengal. The gesture brought no real outcome only a diplomatic move. In the previous year, he raided Bengal, taking 30,000 slaves. According to Mirza Nathan, Thiri Thudhamma possessed 10,000 war-boats, 1,500 elephants, and 1,000,000 infantry. Taking advantage of Shah Jahan's war efforts against Jahangir, the Thiri Thudhamma broke his professed friendship and raided Bhulua. Though thanadar Mirza Baqi commanded 700 cavalry and 300 war-boats, he failed to stop the enemy, who plundered freely and withdrew with rich booty. He further captured Sripur enslaving 10,000 inhabitants. Following Shah Jahan's defeat, Jahangir appointed Mahabat Khan as the subahdar of Bengal, who subsequently entrusted the governorship to his son, Khanahzad Khan. Khanahzad Khan instead installed Mulla Murshid and Hakim Haidar as governors in Dhaka. In 1626, during the weak administration Mulla Murshid and Hakim Haidar, the Thiri Thudhamma marched unopposed from Khizrpur along the Dulai River to Dhaka. The Arakanese sacked and burned the Mughal capital, plundered its surroundings, and carried away numerous captives and slaves. The two officers failed to stop the raid. This was the last major Arakanese raid in Bengal during Jahangir's reign. Shihabuddin Talish author of Fathiya-i-Ibriyya mocked writing "fighting requires bravery and is not the business of Mullas and Hakims."

== War with Arakan–Portuguese (1629–1632) ==
Mrauk U Kingdom at its Zenith

Pieter de Carpentier suggested that Arakanese kept an army of 500 frigates and approximately 80,000 men ready for their wars in south-eastern Bengal. In 1629, an Arakanese fleet under Portuguese captain Diogo de Sa sailed up the Meghna, plundering villages near Dhaka. The invaders withdrew from the vicinity of Dhaka without encountering resistance from the Mughal fleet stationed there. A Mughal noblewoman was captured by the Portuguese. She was raped by her captor and compelled to convert to Christianity, and subsequently married to a young Portuguese captain in Dianga. According to Sebastien Manrique, this incident enraged Shah Jahan's anger to such an extent that he ordered the destruction of Hooghly, as the Portuguese community there maintained close ties with their counterparts in Arakan and Chittagong. The port of Hooghly was supplying Mrauk U with manpower against the Mughals. In 1632, Qasim Khan Juvayni laid siege of Hooghly and destroyed the Portuguese settlement for their misdeeds in Bengal and crush their power. In 1633, the Portuguese Viceroy in Goa sought Arakanese support to recover Hooghly, dispatching an embassy led by Gaspar Pacheco de Mesquita. Mesquita arrived with one galleon and four frigates prepared for an expedition into Bengal. However, disagreements over alliance terms stalled the plan. After five months, the Portuguese fleet departed Arakan, postponing the joint attack on Bengal. In 1637, Mughal governor Islam Khan Mashhadi sent an embassy with gifts to Mrauk U, urging King Sirisudhammaraja to cease Arakanese raids on Bengal.

== Rebellions in Mrauk U (1638–1644) ==
Narapati Kri succeeded the Mrauk U throne in 1638. In August 1638, news reached Mrauk U that the governor of Chittagong, identified in some chronicles as Nga Tun Khin, (Note: He is known as Mangat Rai in Mughal sources.) son of Thiri Thudhamma was preparing to challenge Narapati's succession. Before Narapati's army arrived, loyal troops drove the pretender to Bhulua. Mughal sources claim the imperial army helped by driving away 200 Arakanese jelias blocking his crossing of the Feni River. Nga Tun Khin then fled to Dhaka with 9,000 followers and 14 elephants, where he was welcomed by Subahdar Islam Khan Mashhadi. Narapati sent a fleet in pursuit, which advanced up the river to Sripur. The Fatiyyah-i-ibriyyah gives a slightly different account, naming the pretender Dahar Mah and stating he fled with 4,000–5,000 followers and 19 elephants. Narapati dispatched a fleet composed of over 500 jalias, 150 ghurabs and five ships full of munition, entered the estuary between Bhulua and Sripur. Islam Khan confronted the Arakanese near Dhapa, eight miles below Dhaka, and Mughal forts with heavy guns at Khizrpur prevented them from reaching the city. The Arakanese withdrew after without fighting in September. In December 1639, Nga Tun Khin converted to Islam and his retinue resettled near Dhaka on the Mughal–Arakan frontier. The areas came to known as Maghbazar. In 1640, Mrauk U built its largest fleet for Bengal, but the expedition failed due to losing more men than it captured. In October 1642, the Arakanese fleet raided Bengal, sailing as far as Jagannath in Odisha. Returning in December, they captured an Armenian merchant ship from Balasore and sank eleven Portuguese salt-ships bound for Sripur. In 1643, Arakanese fleet under the ko-ran-kri (chief commander) crushed the Mughal navy in the Bengal delta. Out of 75 Mughal ships, only five survived, leaving Bengal exposed to Arakanese control and plunder.

=== Rebellion in Sandwip ===
In 1644, the governor of Sandwip rebelled and welcomed the Portuguese, who quickly fortified the island. By 1645 Sandwip freed himself from Arakanese control. In 1651, a fleet of about 800 ships, sent to Bengal to retake Sandwip but hastily returned to Arakan.

== Mughal conquest of Chittagong ==
=== Mughal campaigns in (1656–1657) ===
In December 1656, news reached Mrauk U that Mughal Subahdar Shah Shuja had assembled a large army to invade Arakan, reportedly led by a relative of Thiri Thudhamma. Rumours also said the ruler of Sandwip had joined the Mughals. by late January 1657, the Arakanese mobilised a force of total 100,000 troops assisted by naval power. They repaired forts in Chittagong and the border route. However, Mughal prisoners revealed Shah Shuja had changed plans and targeted Tripura instead. The Arakanese sent help to the Tripura king. Shah Shuja's 1656–57 campaign marked the beginning of full Mughal control over south-eastern Bengal. As a result, the Arakanese permanently lost influence over Hijli, Jessore and parts of the Meghna delta. The zamindar of Hijli, Bahadur Khan, who paid tribute to Arakan finally submitted to the Mughals. In March 1657 the Arakanese army returned home.

=== Raid in 1664 ===
In November 1664 the Arakanese gathered a fleet of 30,000 men but could not mobilise. Earlier that year, Sanda Thudhamma enlisted the Portuguese of Chittagong to attack Bengal. By late 1664, 60–70 Arakanese and Portuguese vessels entered the Dhaka river, destroying most of Munawwar Khan's Bengal flotilla. They also raided Bhushna, enslaving 2,800 people. On the Hooghly River, 10–12 Arakanese ships disrupted European trade, worsening Mughal control. After the 1664 attack by the Portuguese from Chittagong Shaista Khan was ordered by Aurangzeb to attack that city.

As a preparation for the war, Abdul Hasan was stationed with 200 war-boats to patrol the Hooghly River and monitor pirate movements, while Muhammad Beg held Dhapa with 100 war-boats to reinforce him in emergencies. Next Sandwip was aimed to be captured first.

=== Capture of Sandwip ===
In November 1665, Admiral Ibn Husain captured Sandwip and a key naval base defeating Dilal Khan, a renegade Mughal captain, while some Portuguese under Captain Moore deserted to the Mughal side.

=== Capture of Chittagong ===
Shaikh Zia al-Din Yusuf negotiated with the Portuguese to take Mughal side. Much of the Portuguese of Chittagong arrived in Bhulua with 42 to 50 jelias. At the end of December 1665, Shaista Khan dispatched his son Buzurg Umed Khan with 4,000–6,000 or 6,500 men and a fleet of 288 boats (Note: Including 21 large ghurabs (gun boats) 157 kosas (galleys).) to attack Chittagong. After the capture of Sandwip, Ibn Husain was ordered to advance with the fleet by sea, while Farhad Khan and Mir Murtaza were directed to march by land in support of the fleet. On 14 January 1666, the imperial army crossed the Feni River, entering Arakanese territory. The Portuguese had their 40 war-ships in the campaign.

On 23 January, Mughal fleet under Ibn Husain, supported by Captain Moore and other Portuguese officers in the van, encountered an Arakanese naval force. 10 ghurabs and 45 jalias of the enemy appeared and opened fire. The Mughal vanguard boldly advanced, causing the lighter enemy vessels to flee. After an initial engagement, Ibn Husain's light and swift ships pursued the enemy, capturing ten ghurabs and three jalias. A second, larger Magh fleet then appeared and fought until sunset before retreating. Ibn Husain chased them out. On the morning of 24 January, the Mughal fleet advanced with banners flying, drums beating, and trumpets sounding, resuming fire. The Maghs, seized with panic, began towing their larger vessels upstream into the Karnafuli River, with their jalias assisting in the retreat while continuing to fight. The Arakanese drew up their fleet in battle order between Chittagong and a midstream island. As the imperial ships entered the mouth of the Karnafuli, the Arakanese opened heavy fire from both their vessels and the fort at Chittagong. Mughals launched a combined land-and-water assault. After stiff resistance, the Arakanese were defeated: many sailors abandoned ship or surrendered, numerous vessels were sunk, and 135 boats were captured by the Mughals.

On 25 January the Mughal fleet besieged Chittagong fort. The garrison, left helpless after losing its navy, resisted for a day before surrendering to Ibn Husain on the 26th. Munawwar Khan's disorderly followers then set fire to much of the town while looting. The next morning, commander‑in‑chief Buzurg Umed Khan arrived by land and entered the fort in triumph, though the spoils were of little value. The city was renamed to Islamabad (transl. land of Islam) by Aurangzeb.

== Aftermath ==
The loss of Chittagong eventually even resulted in the collapse of the Mrauk U state as a whole.

== See also ==
- Restoration of Min Saw Mon
- Bengal–Mrauk U War (1512–1516)
- Mrauk U invasion of Pegu
- Portuguese presence in Asia
- Burmese–Portuguese conflicts

== Bibliography ==
- Borah, M. I. (1936). "CHAPTER IX.". Baharistan-I-Ghaybi. Vol. 1. Gauhati, Assam: Narayani Handiqui Historical Institute.
- Sarkar, Jadunath, ed. (1943). The History of Bengal. Vol. II: Muslim Period. Delhi: B.R. Publishing Corporation. ISBN 81-7646-239-X.
- Roy, Atul Chandra (1968). History of Bengal: Mughal Period, 1526-1765 A.D. Vol. 3. Calcutta: Nababharat Publishers. Archived from the original on 2017-01-23.
- Galen, S.E.A. van (2008). Arakan and Bengal : the rise and decline of the Mrauk U kingdom (Burma) from the fifteenth to the seventeeth century AD. Archived from the original on 2019-11-25.
- Eaton, Richard M. (1996-07-31). The Rise of Islam and the Bengal Frontier, 1204–1760. University of California Press. ISBN 978-0-520-20507-9.
