= Min Sanay =

Man Ca'ne မင်းစနီ

King of Arakan
- Reign: 1 June 1638 - 26 June 1638
- Coronation: 16 June 1638
- Predecessor: Thiri Thudhamma
- Successor: Narapati
- Born: 1620; Mrauk U
- Died: 17 June 1638 (aged 18); Winzama, Mrauk U
- Consort: Nanhtet Miphaya (နန်းထက် မိဖုရား)
- House: Min Bin
- Father: Thiri Thudhamma
- Mother: Nat Shin Mae (နတ်ရှင်မယ်)
- Religion: Theravada Buddhism

Min Sanay also called Man Cane (Rakhine: မင်းစနီ, Burmese: မင်းစနေ), was a king of the Mrauk-U Dynasty of Arakan who reigned for less than one month in 1638. He is last king of royal bloodline of Mrauk-U through house of Saw Mon.

== Crown Prince ==
During his father, Thiri Thudhamma's reign the Laungkrakca (Rakhine: လောင်းကြက်စား); governor of Launggyet) became an important position in the Mrauk U royal court after a rebellion in 1628. In the waning years of his father's reign, various court ministers became aggressive vying for power based on a prophecy in the Arakanese chronicle tradition that the Mrauk U lineage of kings would end in 1638 CE (1000 according to the Arakanese era).

== Reign and succession ==
When Thiri Thudhamma died on 31 May 1638, Min Sanay succeeded the throne and was crowned 15 days later on 16 June. After ascending the throne, Min Sanay suffered from smallpox and his mother Nat Shin Mae advised him to move to "Winzama", northeast of Mrauk U, for a short period of time to cure his disease. Min Sanay followed the advice of his mother and moved to Winzama. There, he was poisoned to death by his own mother Nat Shin Mae. He ruled the kingdom only 20 days. According to Dutch factory chief Adam van der Mandere, Sanay died on 26 June one day after he congratulated the new king in Mrauk U. The court blamed it on sorcery that Thiri Thudhamma had cast on his son.

After the death of Min Sanay, Nat Shin Mae enthroned her secret lover Ngakuthala (later Narapati). Many nobles who disagreed her were murdered and some escaped. Narapati was the Laungkrakca at the time of Thiri Thudhamma's death and, therefore, had significant power within the court. Historian Jacques Leider ascribes this chain of events as a coup d'état by the Laungkrakca.

== Bibliography ==
- Harvey, G. E. (1925). History of Burma: From the Earliest Times to 10 March 1824. London: Frank Cass & Co. Ltd.
- Myat Soe, ed. (1964). Myanma Swezon Kyan (in Burmese). Vol. 9 (1 ed.). Yangon: Sarpay Beikman.
- Myint-U, Thant (2006). The River of Lost Footsteps—Histories of Burma. Farrar, Straus and Giroux. ISBN 978-0-374-16342-6.
- Sandamala Linkara, Ashin (1931). Rakhine Yazawinthit Kyan (in Burmese). Vol. 1–2 (1997 ed.). Yangon: Tetlan Sarpay.
- van Gelen, Stephan (2002). "Arakan at the Turn of the First Millenium of the Arakanese Era". In Gommans, Jos; Leider, Jacques (eds.). The Maritime Frontier of Burma. Amsterdam: Royal Netherlands Academy of Arts and Sciences. pp. 151–162.

Min Sanay Mrauk-U Kingdom Born: 1620 Died: 26 May 1638
Regnal titles
Preceded by Thiri Thudhamma	King of Mrauk-U; 1 – 26 June 1638	Succeeded by Narapati
