= Siege of Chittagong (1621) =

Mughal invasion of Chittagong (1621)

- Part of Mughal–Mrauk U Wars
Date	1621
Location	Chittagong Hills, Kingdom of Mrauk U
Result	Mrauk U victory
Territorial changes	Status quo ante bellum

Belligerents
Mughal Empire	Kingdom of Mrauk U

Commanders and leaders
Ibrahim Khan Fath-i-Jang; Mirza Nurullah	Min Khamaung

Strength
2,000 war-boats 40,000 cavalry and infantry 1,000 elephants	None

Casualties and losses
Unknown	None

The Siege of Chittagong (1621) was a Mughal expedition led by Subahdar Ibrahim Khan Fath-i-Jang to capture the Arakanese-held port city of Chittagong. It was the second major Mughal attempt after the first in 1617. Following a successful defence against an Arakanese invasion in 1620, Ibrahim Khan launched a counter-offensive. After Tripura campaign in 1618, the Mughal army advanced through the dense jungles from the Feni River. In March 1621, Ibrahim personally led a large force of 2,000 war-boats, 40,000 troops, 1,000 elephants, and siege equipment. However, the army got stuck in the hilly jungles of the Chittagong Hills, suffered severe supply shortages, and was forced to retreat without fighting a single battle. The expedition ended in complete failure.

== Background ==
During Ibrahim Khan's viceroyalty (1617–1623), Min Khamaung (r. 1612–1622) launched another expedition into Bengal, advancing to Baghchar near Jahangirnagar in 1620 with designs on the Mughal capital. Ibrahim Khan responded swiftly, first with 32 war-boats and a small retinue, then reinforced by mansabdars and zamindars who brought 7,000–8,000 cavalry and 4,000 to 5,000 boats. His decisive leadership forced the Arakan king to retreat. He left a frontier guard of boats. Ibrahim then strengthened the forts, stationed part of the fleet at Phuldubi in Faridpur, and returned to Jahangirnagar in October 1620.

== Siege ==
After the conquest of Tripura Ibrahim Khan decided to lead expedition against Arakan. In March 1621, the Mughals made second attempt to capture Chittagong. This time marching through a new overland route suggested by Mirza Nurullah, thanadar of Udaipur. The people of Tripura offered to guide the imperial army to Arakan by the route once taken by the Raja of Tripura. The plan was to advance from the Feni River across the plain west of the Chittagong Hills and then through the jungles along the Chittagong–Tripura border. Subahdar Ibrahim Khan personally commanded the expedition after two years of preparation. He assembled a large force comprising 2,000 war-boats, 40,000 cavalry and infantry, 1,000 elephants, and heavy siege equipment, while stockpiling provisions at Bhulua. The army advanced from the Feni River into the densely forested hilly terrain on the border. Progress soon became impossible. The war-boats had to be abandoned, the cavalry could not proceed, and even the elephants moved only with great difficulty. The massive Mughal column became stuck in the thick jungles of the Chittagong Hills. Soon the lack of food supply began. Without engaging the Arakanese in battle, Ibrahim Khan was forced to admit defeat and order a withdrawal. Although Arakanese forces did not attack the Mughal supply lines during this campaign, the extreme logistical challenges posed by the dense jungle terrain proved insurmountable.

== Aftermath ==
Thus, the second attempt to conquer Chittagong failed also miserably. Following this failure, no further Mughal army attempted to invade Chittagong via the Tripura–Chittagong jungle route. Later in August 1621, Arakanese again carried out raid into Bengal.

== See also ==
- Mughal conquest of Bhulua
- Mrauk U invasion of Chittagong
- Siege of Chittagong (1617)
- Mrauk U invasion of Pegu

== Bibliography ==
- Borah, M. I. (1936). "Book II". Baharistan-I-Ghaybi. Vol. 1. Gauhati, Assam: Narayani Handiqui Historical Institute.
- Sarkar, Jadunath, ed. (1943). The History of Bengal. Vol. II: Muslim Period. Delhi: B.R. Publishing Corporation. ISBN 81-7646-239-X.
- Roy, Atul Chandra (1968). History of Bengal: Mughal Period, 1526-1765 A.D. Vol. 3. Calcutta: Nababharat Publishers. Archived from the original on 2017-01-23.
- Galen, S.E.A. van (2008). Arakan and Bengal : the rise and decline of the Mrauk U kingdom (Burma) from the fifteenth to the seventeeth century AD. Archived from the original on 2019-11-25.
