= Siege of Chittagong =

Siege of Chittagong may refer to:

- Siege of Chittagong (1617), first Mughal attempt to capture Chittagong from Mrauk U
- Siege of Chittagong (1621), second Mughal attempt to capture Chittagong from Mrauk U
- Siege of Chittagong (1666), Mughal conquest of Chittagong from Mrauk U
