= Narapati of Mrauk-U =

Narapati နရပတိကြီး

King of Arakan
- Reign: 27 June 1638 - 3 December 1645
- Coronation: 3 July 1638
- Predecessor: Sanay
- succession: Thado
- Born: Maung Ku-tha မောင်ကုသလ; 1600s Launggyet
- Died: 3 December 1645; Mrauk U
- Consort: Nat Shin May
- Issue: Thado
Names
- Hsinphyuthakhin Hsinnithakhin Narapatigyi ဆင်ဖြူသခင် ဆင်နီသခင် နရပတိကြီး
- House: Narapatigyi
- Religion: Theravada Buddhism

Narapati of Mrauk U (Rakhine: နာရပတိ (မြောက်ဦး)); whose personal name Nga-Kuthala (Rakhine: ငကုသလ), was a king of the Mrauk-U Dynasty of Arakan. He was a great-grandson of Min Bin.

The Yatra Bell, which was believed to protect the Rakhine people, was created during the reign of King Narapati.

== Ascent to the throne ==
Prior to his predecessor Min Sanay's ascension, King Thiri Thudhamma had inadvertently elevated the importance of the Laungkrakca, the governor of Launggyet. At the time of his death and Sanay's ascension, Narapati was the Laungkrakca and was vying for power within the royal court. When Sanay died from smallpox, Narapati seized the throne for himself with the help of Sane's mother Nat Shin Mae- who also happened to be his lover. He then bore the title of Narapati which means "Lord of the people". To secure his accession, Narapati murdered many royal relatives and nobles, causing targeted survivors to flee to Chittagong. Historian Jacques Leider ascribes the mysterious death of Thiri Thudhamma and Sanay as a coup d'état by Narapati.

Narapati was crowned on 3 July 1638. Soon after in September 1638, his claim to the throne was challenged by the "King of Chittagong". Arakanese chronicles identify this pretender as Ngatunkhin, a son of Thiri Thudhamma. Contemporary Mughal sources identified him as a brother of Narapati by the name of Mangat Rai. Narapati detached a military force led by his chief bodyguard and pushed the Chittagonian rebellion into Mughal territory. There, Ngatunkhin/Mangat Rai set up a base of operations by December 1639. The kingdom remained unstable with fears of a Mughal invasion or rumours of a restoration of the old royal house.

== Reign ==
In Narapati's reign, the military might of Mrauk U began to dwindle. However, one of the achievements of Narapati was that he established diplomatic ties with Ava in 1640. He did not maintain good relations with the Dutch for trade. Narapati did not feel the need to adopt a Muslim name like his predecessors, which was a tradition for Arakanese kings who had control of Chittagong. Thus, the coins minted in his reign omitted the Kalima and the Persian script altogether.

In December 1643, the new governor of Chittagong rebelled, taking a large group of Portuguese mercenaries with him into Mughal territory. Narapati sent substantial army to quell the rebellion, led by his right hand man since he was unable to walk due to illness. This expedition pillaged Chittagong bringing back 80,000 people - mostly weavers—and several tens of thousands of cattle. This effectively destroyed the importance of Chittagong as a trade centre and created deep division in Arakan as the Dutch East India Company and various nobles protested the move. The sceptics of the king's plan were eventually proven correct as the resettled craftsmen were decimated by a famine in 1645 caused by the sudden change in population, effectively destroying Arakan's textile industry as well.

During the last year of his reign, the king became suspicious of his wife Nat Shin May. After a trial of strength, he succeeded in expelling her from the palace. Due to this, a fear of death started to haunt him, believing his wife or an ill disposed person will come towards him. In desperation, he built two pagodas, Thet-daw-She and Thet-daw-Saung close to the palace.

The king ruled until his death. He died due to illness in December 1645, with his son Thado succeeding him.

Narapati of Mrauk-U Mrauk-U Kingdom Born: 1600s Died: 3 December 1645
Regnal titles
Preceded by Sanay	King of Mrauk-U; June 1638 - December 1645	Succeeded by Thado
