= Thiri Thudhamma =

Srisudhammaraja သီရိသုဓမ္မရာဇာ
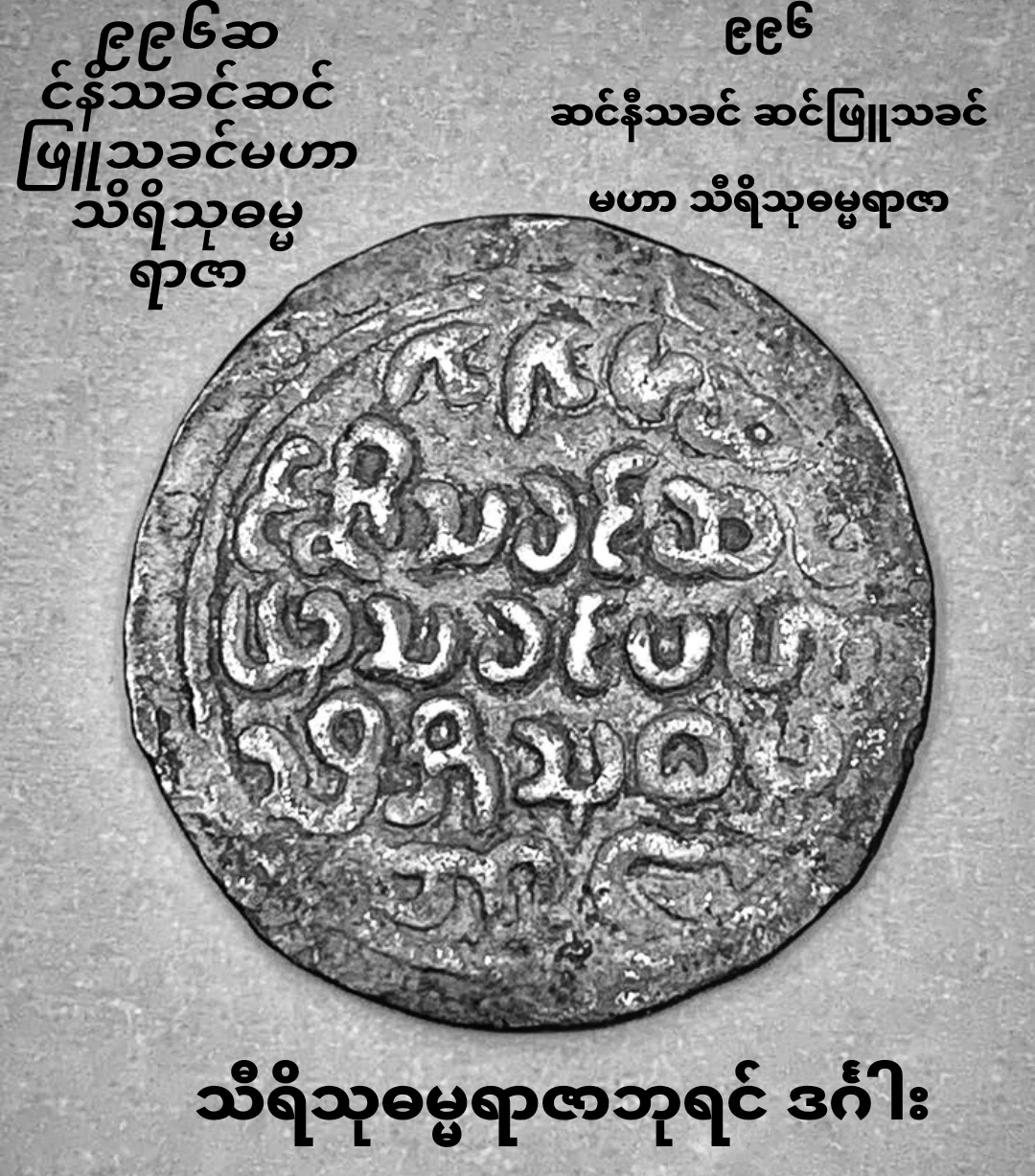
- Arakan King Thiri Thudhamma Raza's Coin stamped in Arakanese Era 996

King of Arakan
- Reign: 1622-1638
- Coronation: 10th waxing of Nayon, 984 ME
- Predecessor: Khamaung
- Successor: Sanay
- Born: c. April 1602 Tagu 948 ME; Mrauk U palace
- Died: 31 May, 1638 4th waxing of Nayon, 984 ME (aged 36); Mrauk U
- Consort: Natshinmae (နတ်ရှင်မယ်)
- Issue: Sanay; Man Kyi Swa; Shwe Kyin Swa and 16 others
Names
- Hsinphyuthakhin, Hsinnithakhin Thiri Thudhamma Raza (ဆင်ဖြူသခင်၊ ဆင်နီသခင် သီရိသုဓမ္မရာဇာ); Salim Shah II of Mrauk U
- House: Min Bin
- Father: Khamaung
- Mother: Shin Htwe (ရှင်ထွေး)
- Religion: Theravada Buddhism

Thiri Thudhamma also called Srisudhammaraja (Arakanese:သီရိသုဓမ္မ; c. April 1602 - 31 May 1638) whose personal name was Min Hari (မင်းဟရီ) was a king of the Mrauk-U Dynasty of Arakan.

== Early life ==
After the death of Min Khamaung, his crown prince son, Min Hari, ascended the throne and took on the title of Thiri Thudhamma.

Thiri Thudhamma was between 18 and 20 years old when he took the throne. He married his half-sister, Nat Shin May, who would later become an influential queen.

The king was also known as Salim Shah II by the neighbouring Bengal.

He would work on repairing infrastructure built in the time of Min Bin, including the defences of the city of Mrauk U.

== Reign ==
During Thudhamma's rule of Arakan, Muhammad Khurram (later Shah Jahan) took control of neighbouring Mughal Bengal in 1624. Thudamma took advantage of the Bengal crisis by leading a raid into Bhalwa (Noakhali), where he defeated the local administrator Mirza Baqi and returned to Arakan with plenty of war booty.

It is known that the king had 10,000 war-boats, 1,500 elephants, and one million infantry which made him a formidable force in the region.

Thudhamma's commanding officer was Ashraf Khan, a devoted Sufi Muslim and the patron of renowned Bengali poet Daulat Qazi.

In 1623, he captured approximately 30,000 Bengali slaves, which were noted for being strong and healthy, attributed to the abundance of food in Arakan.

In May 1624, when Shah Jahan entered Dhaka, an Arakanese embassy arrived to show support for the rebellious prince. The king of Arakan, Sirisudhammaraja, expressed sympathy towards Shah Jahan’s cause. The Arakanese embassy brought gifts worth 100,000 Rupees and received robes of honour and a firman (official decree) confirming the king's territories in return.

During his reign, in April 1624, the Dutch began trade relations with the city of Mrauk U.

In 1628, the King sent an embassy to the Siamese court, likely aiming to build military ties against the Burmese. However, his attempt to capture the ports of Myeik and Tanintharyi in late 1637 was viewed by Siam as a hostile move.

In 1628, the Laungkrakca (Rakhine: လောင်းကြက်စား); governor of Launggyet) rebelled and posed a threat of Thiri Thudhamma's reign. The rebellion was put down and many leading men executed, but this only furthered the importance of future Laungkrakca.

In 1635, a grand coronation ceremony was organized by the King. This event was celebrated with the issue of a coin inscribed only in Pali, showing his strong Rakhine Buddhist identity.

== Death and succession ==
At the time, the Arakanese chronicle tradition had prophecised that the Mrauk U lineage of kings would end by the turn of the first millennium- roughly 1638 according to the Arakanese era. Rumours of Thiri Thudhamma's impending death circulated not long after his coronation. In the 1630s, the various court ministers in Mrauk U became more aggressive in vying for power.

On 31 May 1638, Thiri Thudhamma mysteriously died. His son and crown prince Min Sanay ascended the throne. Then On 26 June, Sanay also mysteriously died. The court blamed it on Thiri Thudhamma casting sorcery on his son. After this, the Laugkrakca ascended the throne as Narapati. Historian Jacques Leider ascribes this chain of events as a coup d'état by the Laungkrakca.

== Bibliography ==
- Harvey, G. E. (1925). History of Burma: From the Earliest Times to 10 March 1824. London: Frank Cass & Co. Ltd.
- Myat Soe, ed. (1964). Myanma Swezon Kyan (in Burmese). Vol. 9 (1 ed.). Yangon: Sarpay Beikman.
- Myint-U, Thant (2006). The River of Lost Footsteps—Histories of Burma. Farrar, Straus and Giroux. ISBN 978-0-374-16342-6.
- Sandamala Linkara, Ashin (1931). Rakhine Yazawinthit Kyan (in Burmese). Vol. 1–2 (1997 ed.). Yangon: Tetlan Sarpay.
- Aye Chan (2017). ရခိုင်သမိုင်းမိတ်ဆက် [Introduction to Rakhine History]. Yangon: Shwe Thazin Publishing House.
- van Gelen, Stephan (2002). "Arakan at the Turn of the First Millenium of the Arakanese Era". In Gommans, Jos; Leider, Jacques (eds.). The Maritime Frontier of Burma. Amsterdam: Royal Netherlands Academy of Arts and Sciences. pp. 151–162.

Thiri Thudhamma Mrauk-U Kingdom Born: April 1602 Died: 31 May 1638
Regnal titles
Preceded by Khamaung	King of Mrauk-U; June 1622 – 31 May 1638	Succeeded by Sanay
