= Nat Shin May =

Nat Shin May နတ်ရှင်မယ်

Queen Consort of Mrauk U
- Tenure: from 1622–1645
- Predecessor: Shin Htwe (ရှင်ထွေး)
- Successor: Nanhtet Miphaya (နန်းထက် မိဖုရား)
- Born: c. early 1600s Mrauk U, Kingdom of Mrauk U
- Died: c. 1660s Mrauk U Kingdom of Mrauk U
- Spouse: Thiri Thudhamma (by 1622–1638); Narapati (by 1638–1645)
- Issue: Min Sanay Man Kyi Swa Shwe Kyin Swa and 16 others
Names
- Natshin Mae or Natshinmaye နတ်ရှင်မယ်
- Father: Min Khamaung
- Mother: Dhamma Déwi II or Thupaba Déwi II
- Religion: Theravada Buddhism

Nat Shin May (Burmese: နတ်ရှင်မယ်) was the queen consort to two consecutive of kings of Mrauk U: Thiri Thudhamma (r. 1622–1638) and Narapati (r. 1638 – 1645). She played a significant role in court politics during the final year of Thiri Thudhamma's reign, and is implicated in events surrounding the death of her son, Min Sanay, and the ascension of her lover, Nga-Kuthala (later King Narapati).

Queen Nat-Shin-May was involved in maritime trade during the height of Mrauk U's peak in the 1630s. Dutch sources note her participation in trading activities, alongside King Sīrisudhammarājā's initiatives, such as the creation of a rice monopoly and the dispatch of royal ships to sell Arakanese elephants in South India.

== Background ==
During Thiri Thudhamma’s reign, the Kingdom of Mrauk U was an active maritime power on the Bay of Bengal, engaged in trade, diplomacy and raids into Bengal. The court was cosmopolitan of Persian, Portuguese and Dutch influences. The court factions to local governors, ministers, and foreign mercenary groups frequently vied for power. Tensions has been increasing in the governance position since 1638.

Since the early 16th century, Arakanese kings promoted trade to increase state and personal income. Nat Shin May was the daughter of king Min Khamaung.

== Queen consort ==
Nat Shin May was a half sister of Sirisudhammaraja. She became the queen consort of Mrauk U after their marriage.

Nat Shin May was a bridge between two power blocs, she was married to the king and was in secret alliance with the king's rival and future usurper. According to the Arakanese chronicles, Nga Khuthala seduced Nat Shin May. He used poetic propaganda and occult imagery (yatra /black magic rituals) to symbolically weaken the king's authority. Nat Shin Mae also had a son with the king, who was later known as Min Sanay.

Her husband, king Sirisudhammaraja, died suddenly on 31 May 1638 during intense factional conflict. According to the Dutchs, the suspected reason for the king's dead was poisoning by his wife. While Arakanese chronicles blame Nga Khuthala's magic rituals, European observers blamed political intrigue rather than magic.

After Sirisudhammaraja died, Nat Shin May also began operating her own trade ships to Coromandel. Royal women rarely acted as independent merchants. The queen, thus had personal wealth, influence, and political agency beyond her ceremonial role.

Shortly after Sirisudhammaraja's death, their son Min Sanay became king. He reigned for only 26–28 days and later died of smallpox. However, the Arakanese chronicles accuse his mother, Nat Shin May of poisoning him by giving drugs to worsen the disease.

After Min Sanay's death, Nga Khuthala ascended the throne (July 3, 1638) and became known as King Narapati-kri. Nat Shin May is crowned beside him as queen.
