= Thado of Mrauk-U =

Thado Mintaya သတိုးမင်းတရား

King of Arakan
- Reign: 3 December 1645 - May 1652
- Coronation: 11th waning of Nattaw, 1007 ME
- Predecessor: Narapati
- Successor: Sanda Thudhamma
- Born: Nyo Raung Phyu ညိုရောင်ဖြူ 1618/19 CE 981 ME
- Died: May 1652 (aged 33); Mrauk U palace
- Consort: Yadanar Konmaryi; Shin lat Saw Bot Mae; Miphaya Phyu
- Issue: Sanda Thudhamma and 30 others
Names
- Hsinphyuthakhin Hsinnithakhin Thadomintaya ဆင်ဖြူသခင် ဆင်နီသခင် သတိုးမင်းတရား
- House: Narapatigyi
- Father: Narapati
- Mother: unknown
- Religion: Theravada Buddhism

Thado of Mrauk-U (Arakanese:သတိုးမင်းတရား, was a king of the Mrauk-U Kingdom of Arakan from 1645 to 1652.

== Reign ==
After Narapati's death in December 1645, his son and crown prince acceded to the throne. The prince took on the name of Thadomintayagyi and was crowned alongside his biological sister Yadana Kummari, who he married and had taken on as his queen. A popular folk tale suggests that the king used to have sexual intercourse with his sister every night.

== Bibliography ==
- Aye Chan (2017). ရခိုင်သမိုင်းမိတ်ဆက် [Introduction to Rakhine History]. Yangon: Shwe Thazin Publishing House.
- Harvey, G. E. (1925). History of Burma: From the Earliest Times to 10 March 1824. London: Frank Cass & Co. Ltd.
- Myat Soe, ed. (1964). Myanma Swezon Kyan (in Burmese). Vol. 9 (1 ed.). Yangon: Sarpay Beikman.
- Myint-U, Thant (2006). The River of Lost Footsteps—Histories of Burma. Farrar, Straus and Giroux. ISBN 978-0-374-16342-6.
- Sandamala Linkara, Ashin (1931). Rakhine Yazawinthit Kyan (in Burmese). Vol. 1–2 (1997 ed.). Yangon: Tetlan Sarpay.

Thado of Mrauk-U Mrauk-U Kingdom Born: 1618/19 Died: May 1652
Regnal titles
| Preceded by Narapati | King of Mrauk-U; December 1645 - May 1652 | Succeeded by Sanda Thudhamma |
