= The Golden Letter of King Alaungpaya =

Burmese manuscript on rolled gold (1756)

The Golden Letter is a manuscript written on rolled gold in the Burmese language, which was sent on 7 May 1756 by King Alaungpaya of Burma to the King George II of Great Britain in London. It is now preserved at the Gottfried Wilhelm Leibniz Library in Hanover. In 2015, the Golden Letter was added to UNESCO's Memory of the World International Register, as a common heritage of Myanmar, Germany, and the United Kingdom.

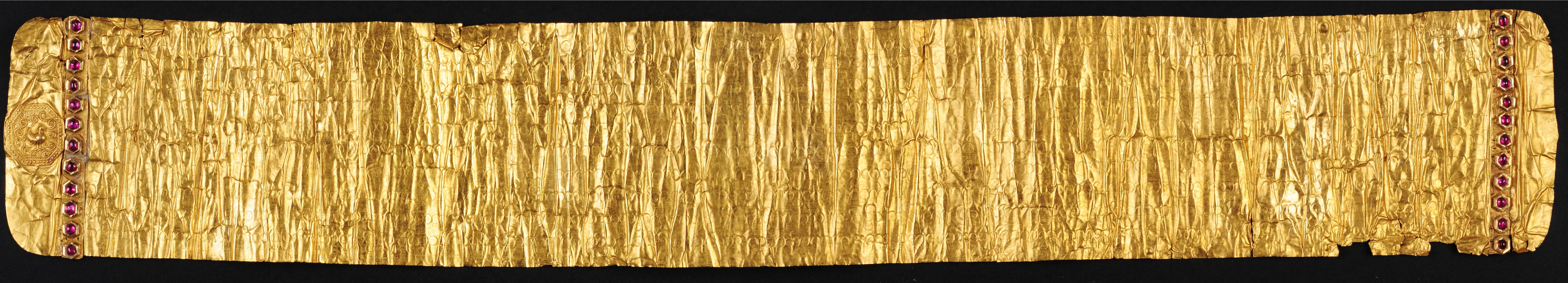
The Golden Letter. The mythical bird Hamsa is depicted on the left. Rows of rubies are set on both left and right. Damage from 1768 can be recognized at bottom-right.

== History ==
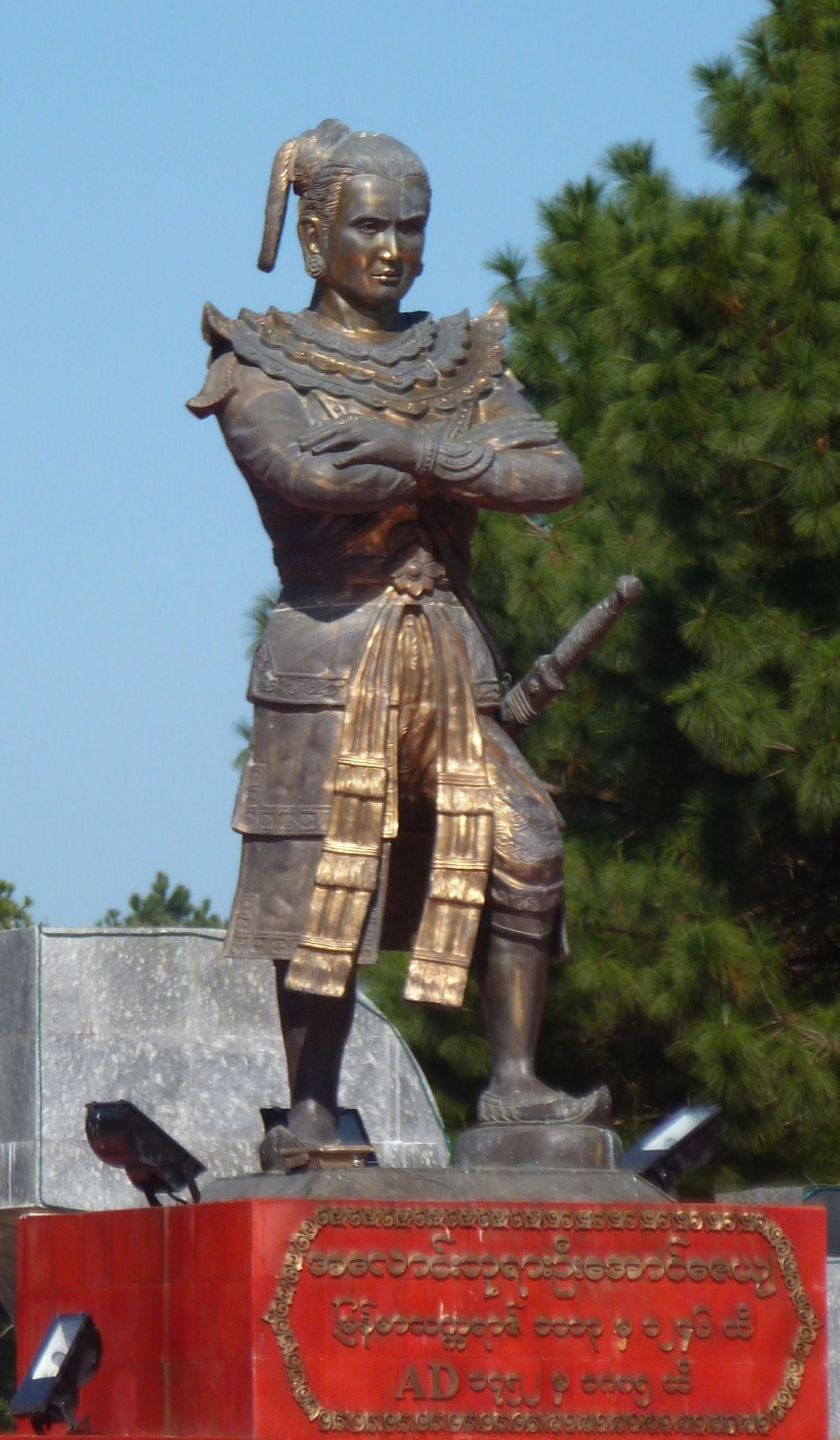
King Alaungpaya of Burma

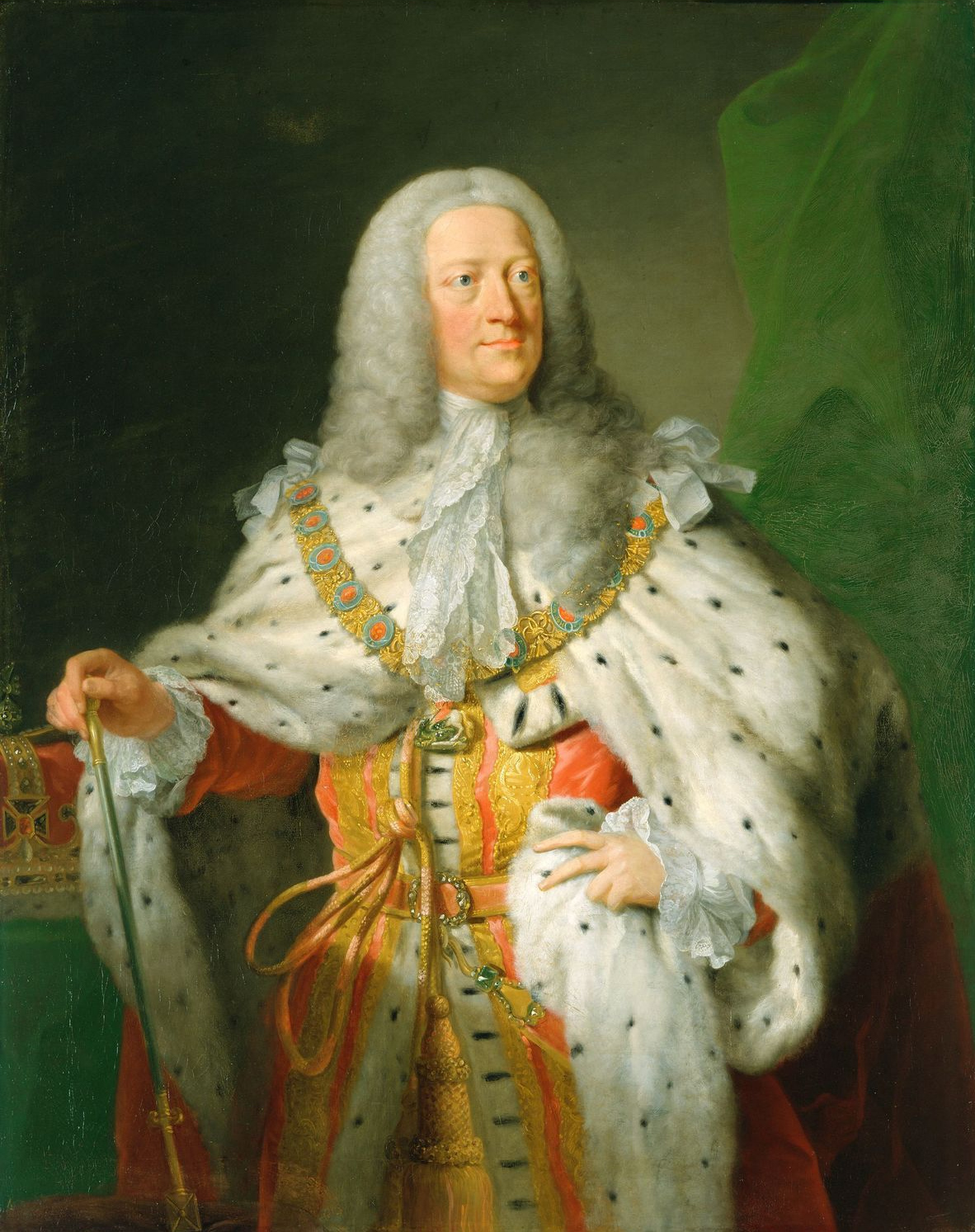
George II of Great Britain

King Alaungpaya of Burma was one of the most influential rulers of his time in Southeast Asia. During this era, the British East India Company (EIC), founded in 1600, had established itself in India and was building up its economic and political influence. On the "tenth day of the waxing Moon in the [Burmese] month Kason of the Sakkaraj-year 1118" (7 May 1756 in the Gregorian calendar), Alaungpaya directed that four letters be drawn up by his chancery. One letter – the golden and thus the most important – was addressed to the British king, George II. The second was addressed to the director of the East India Company, the third to the British President of Madras, and the fourth to the headmaster of the island Negrais in the Irrawaddy River delta.

To avoid misunderstandings or misinterpretation of their contents, Alaungpaya had all the letters, which differed in both content and style depending on their respective recipients, already be translated in Rangoon, and sent these translations together with the originals. At the headquarters of the East India Company in London, the receipt of the letter was recorded.

In the Golden Letter, Alaungpaya offered to George II that the longstanding trade relationship between their countries be expanded. Among other things, this could be done by having the East India Company set up a fortified trading post at the harbor city Pathein on the southwestern coast of Burma. At the time of the letter's composition, the company had only a minor outpost on the small island of Negrais. This was far away from trading routes, had no infrastructure to support it, and lay in an unhealthy climatic zone.

The fact that one king wrote to another to make such an offer in the form of a costly, artfully produced and decorated letter made from gold, showed on the one hand the importance and value of the offer, and on the other hand the generosity of this gesture. Both sides stood to profit: the sender could project his reputation externally, and burnish his own internal power. The recipient could further his economic strategy against the competition from the French East India Company (Compagnie française des Indes orientales).

The recipient of the Golden Letter was George II, who was born in Hanover and belonged to the House of Welf. He was simultaneously the King of Great Britain and the Elector of Hanover, joining these territories in personal union. The letter was next sent to Madras, where there were various delays causing it to arrive in London only in March 1758, almost two years after it was first sent.

One reason for the almost two-year delay could be the Seven Years' War, which broke out in 1756, the year that the letter was written. Great Britain was directly involved in the war. Alaungpaya sent the Golden Letter to George II together with another letter addressed to the directors of the East India Company. Both recipients, however, understood neither the contents nor the significance of the message, and therefore saw no reason to respond in a diplomatically measured manner. This initiative of the Burmese ruler was seen more as a curiosity, than as a serious political move by a less-powerful state. Alaungpaya not only received no reply to his offer, but had no acknowledgement that the letters had even arrived at their destinations. It is known that he saw this disregard for him as a serious insult.

George II sent the letter, considered to be a curiosity, to the library in his home city of Hanover, where it arrived three weeks later, albeit with an incorrect description. The error was due to Gerlach Adolph von Münchhausen, who was a Privy Counsellor to George II. Münchhausen described it, in a ministerial letter to the librarian at Hannover, Christian Ludwig Scheidt, as a diplomatic note in "Indian" (i.e. Sanskrit) from an Indian prince of the Coromandel Coast, whose religion forbade him from eating anything living and who worshipped fire. Thus was the letter archived. For the next 248 years, apart from an incident in 1768, the Golden Letter received no more attention. On 11 June 1768, the Danish prince (later King) Christian VII arrived in Hanover on his Grand Tour, where the Letter was shown to him. However, he accidentally damaged it. This damage is still visible today. The letter returned to obscurity. In 1867, Eduard Bodemann copied the erroneous description of the letter for his catalog of the "Royal Library at Hanover" under the shelf mark "IV 571 a".

Although the Golden Letter was known to have existed, and transcripts could be found in various archives, until its "rediscovery" in 2006, it was unknown where the original was or whether it even still existed. Only after this rediscovery was the text translated, and its true significance recognized. In February 2013, the Golden Letter was registered in the German list of national cultural treasures, under the law for cultural protection (Kulturschutzgesetz).

=== Description ===
==== Material ====
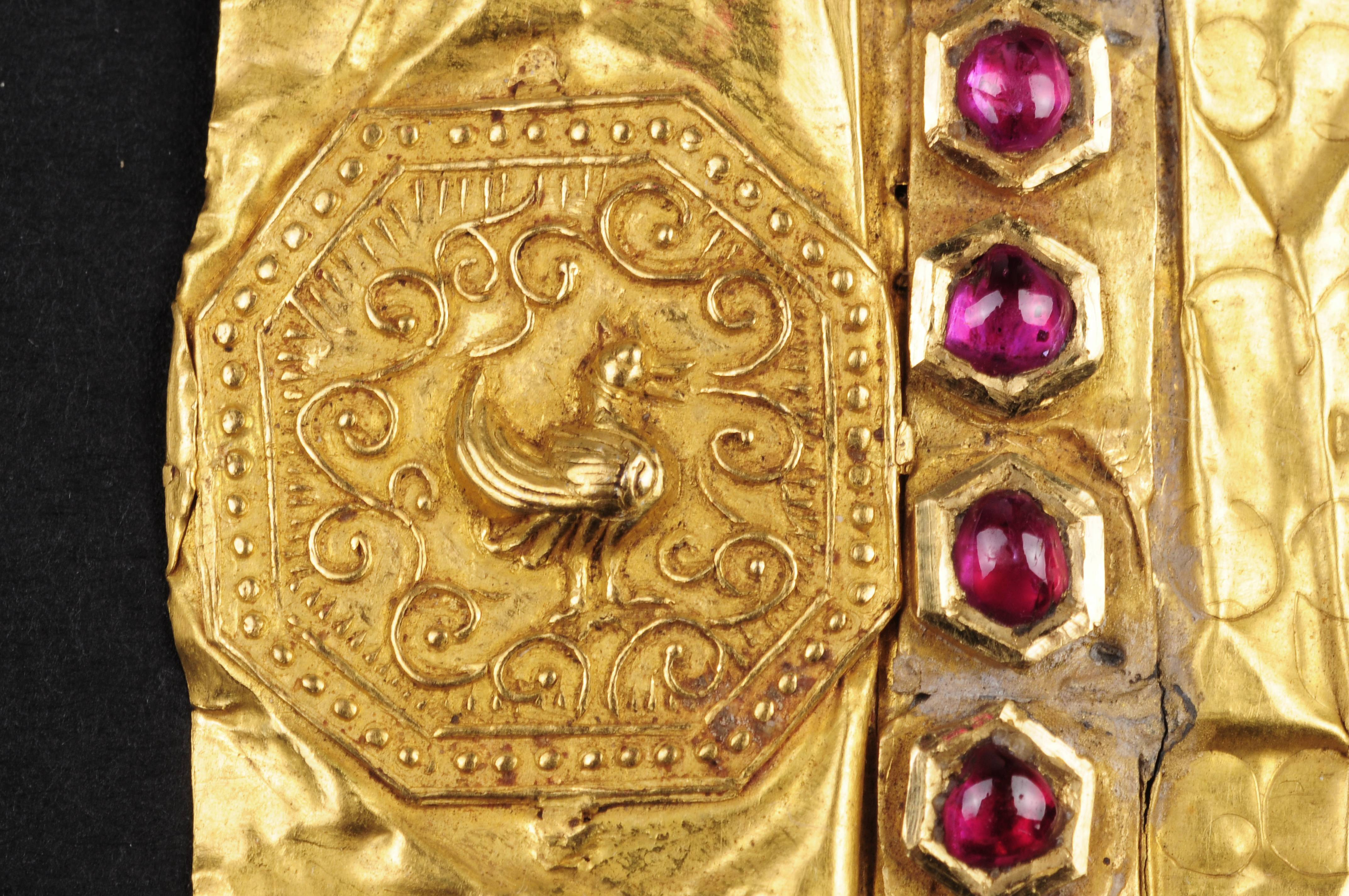
The mythical bird Hamsa, sign of Alaungpaya.

The rectangular letter measures 54.7 by 8.5 centimetres (21.5 by 3.3 in), and is 0.2 millimetres (0.0079 in) thick. Including the 24 rubies, its total weight is 100 grams (3.5 oz). Spectroscopic analysis by the Lower Saxony State Office for the Protection of Historical Monuments (Niedersächsichen Landesamt für Denkmalpflege) found its fineness to be between 95.25 and 98.69%. The 24 egg-shaped rubies originate from a mine in the region of the Burmese city Mogok. Each ruby is held in a hexagonal setting of gold, measuring 6 by 6 millimetres (0.24 by 0.24 in).

==== Ornamentation ====
The thin gold layer is bordered on both right and left sides of the text by two vertical rows of twelve rubies each. On the left edge is an embossed figure of the mythical bird Hamsa, the king's signet, in an octagonal, richly decorated field. The signet figure was pressed onto the letter.

==== Text ====
The text of the letter runs from left to right. It is finely engraved in Burmese script in ten lines of equal length.

==== Containers ====
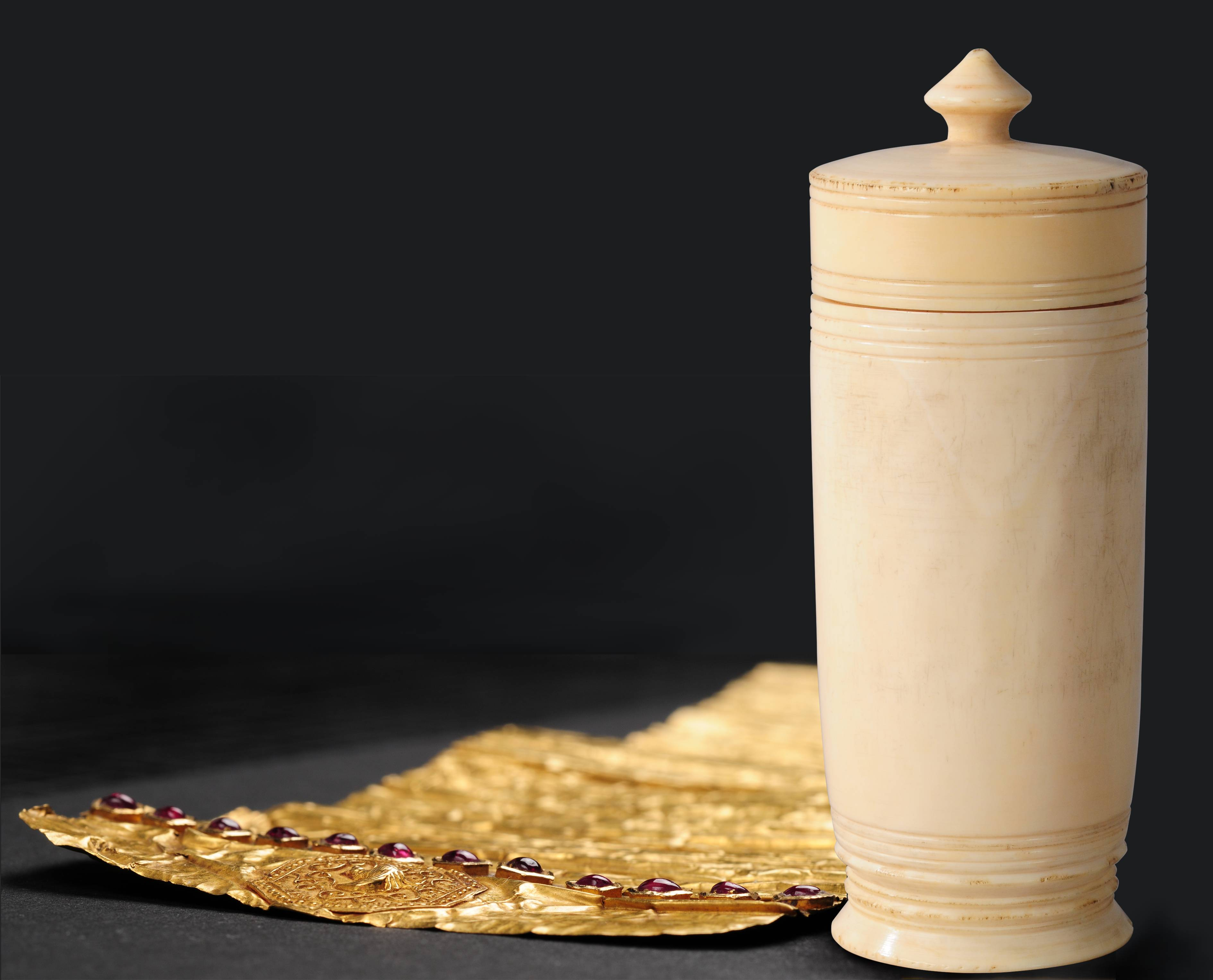
The only surviving container used to transport the letter, a hollowed-out and ornamented elephant tusk.

The packaging of this valuable document for delivery was chosen to be artistically lavish and expensive, as well as robust for the long journey. The Letter was originally rolled in red paper and then stored in a cylindrical ivory container. This lidded container was especially made from a hollowed-out and decorated tusk of a Burmese elephant (Elephas maximus indicus). Only some of the ornamentation can be recognized today. The container was itself placed in a kind of pouch made from brocade. This was itself inside a casket of polished wood, varnished with red resin and ornamented with gold. Attached to the casket was a piece of paper with the text in English. For protection, all these containers were further stowed in a robust red pouch while en route to London. Aside from the ivory cylinder, nothing remains of the other containers.

=== "Forgotten" and rediscovered ===
Due to the entry in the Bodemann Catalogue under the shelf mark "Ms IV 571a", the existence of the Letter was always known within the Gottfried Wilhelm Leibniz Library (GWLB) and to researchers, not least because of transcripts in various archives. However, because of the erroneous description, the original received almost no attention for 250 years. In July 2005, Friedrich Hülsmann, the director of the Book- and Library-Systems department at the GWLB, invited Jacques Leider, a Luxembourg-born historian and Southeast Asia expert at the École française d'Extrême-Orient in Paris, to help with identifying the document. Until this time, it was thought to be a Sanskrit document because of the catalogue entry. At the first examination, Leider already determined that it was written in Burmese, and that its meaning had been completely misunderstood until then.

=== Research ===
Jacques Leider was tasked in 2007 by the GWLB to research on the history of the Golden Letter. In addition to researching the history of the Letter and its "fate" in London, Leider translated the text and compared the original with other versions that exist as transcriptions in archives, e.g. in Myanmar. He published his results in 2009 in an extensive report. In 2013, the German Federal Foreign Office sponsored the 3D-digitization of the Letter through its cultural programme.

=== Significance ===
The choice of material and the quality of the handiwork are indicators of the status that the author attached to the contents of the Golden Letter and its recipient - and also to himself. The Letter could be the only example of its kind in the world today. That Great Britain, in the person of George II, was so uninterested in cooperating with Burma, could be put down to the geopolitical situation of the time. From 1756, Britain and other European states were involved in the Seven Years' War. It fought against several European states on different continents, and also in North America. Even the duchy of Hanover was involved on the British side in this conflict. Due to the years of conflicts, the East India Company withdrew from Burma and showed little interest in expanding its engagement there. Eventually, this together with many ill-advised political and military actions by Britain caused Alaungpaya to destroy the outpost on Negrais in the Irrawaddy Delta, which broke relations between the two states for decades.

The document also allowed a reassessment of the legacy of Alaungpaya, whose role was often oversimplified to that of a warrior, neglecting his actions in geopolitics and as a skilled international diplomat.

Against this background, the Golden Letter of Alaungpaya is not only a unique artefact of art history, but also a window into the contemporary geopolitical relationship between Great Britain (and the East India Company in particular) and a resurgent Kingdom of Burma.

=== UNESCO Memory of the World International Register ===
In 2014, the Gottfried Wilhelm Leibniz Library, the Myanmar Ministry for Culture, and the British Library sent their nomination of the Golden Letter as a documentary heritage to UNESCO for inclusion in the Memory of the World International Register. This application was approved in October 2015, and the Golden Letter has been included in the register since then.

Due to a long renovation of the library building, the certificate from UNESCO was finally presented on 29 March 2017 by Verena Metze-Mangold, president of the UNESCO commission, to the library director Anne May. Present at the ceremony were Yin Yin Myint, Myanmar ambassador; Annabel Gallop, the curator of the Southeast Asian collection at the British Library; Prince Heinrich of Hanover representing the House of Welf; and Gabriele Heinen-Kljajić, State Minister for Science and Culture in Lower Saxony.
