= Kha Maung Seik =

Town in Rakhine State, Myanmar

Kha Maung Seik ခမောင်းဆိပ်မြို့
- Town
- Location in Myanmar (Burma)
- Coordinates: 21°15′56″N 93°15′36″E
- Country: Myanmar
- Division: Rakhine State
- District: Maungdaw District
- Township: Maungdaw Township
- Time zone: UTC+6.30 (MMT)

Kha Maung Seik (Burmese: ခမောင်းဆိပ်) is a town in Maungdaw Township, Rakhine State, Myanmar.

== History ==
On 26 August 2017, Hindu villages from Kha Maung Seik were attacked and 99 Bengali Hindu villagers were massacred by Muslim insurgents from the Arakan Rohingya Salvation Army (ARSA).

Kha Maung Seik was upgraded as a town on 2 February 2016 by combination of nearby seven villages, Ah Nauk Hka Maung Seik, Ah San Kyaw, Ah Shey Kha Maung Seik, Mee Kyaung Chaung, Min Kha Maung (NaTaLa), Taing Bin Gar and Ye Bauk Kyar.

The town was the birthplace of King Min Khamaung, who was named after this place.
