= Rila Mukherjee =

Rila Mukherjee is a historian and author. She is a professor at the University of Hyderabad. She is a scholar of Indian Ocean studies.

== Early life and education ==
Mukherjee's father, Ramkrishna Mukherjee, and mother, Prabhati Mukherjee, were academics.

Mukherjee completed her PhD from the School for Advanced Studies in the Social Sciences.

== Career ==
Mukherjee taught history at Jadavpur University from 1992 to 2007. She joined the University of Hyderabad in 2007. She is a fellow of the Centre for Studies in Social Sciences, Calcutta. She is a staff member of the International Institute for Asian Studies. She is the editor of the Asian Review of World Histories published by the Asian Association of World Historians.

== Bibliography ==
- India in the Indian Ocean World: From the Earliest Times to 1800 CE
- Indian Ocean Histories
- From Mountain Fastness to Coastal Kingdoms
- Oceans Connect: Reflections on Water Worlds across Time and Space (Issues in History)
- Living with Water: Peoples, Lives and Livelihoods in Asia and Beyond
- Rethinking Connectivity: Region, Place and Space in Asia (Issues in History)
- Beyond National Frames (Issues in History)
- Subversive Sovereigns Across the Seas Indian Ocean Ports of Trade From Early Historic Times to Late Colonialism
- Vanguards of Globalization (Issues in History)
- Pelagic Passageways: The Northern Bay of Bengal Before Colonialism
- Networks in the First Global Age: 1400-1800 published by the Indian Council of Historical Research.
- Cross-Cultural Networking in the Eastern Indian Ocean Realm, c. 100-1800
- Europe Transformed: 1350-1789
- Strange Riches: Bengal in the Mercantile Map of South Asia
- Locality, History, Memory: The Making of the Citizen in South Asia (Pasts and Futures: Readings in a Contemporary World)
