= Min Khamaung =

King of Arakan from 1612 to 1622

Min Khamaung မင်းခမောင်း
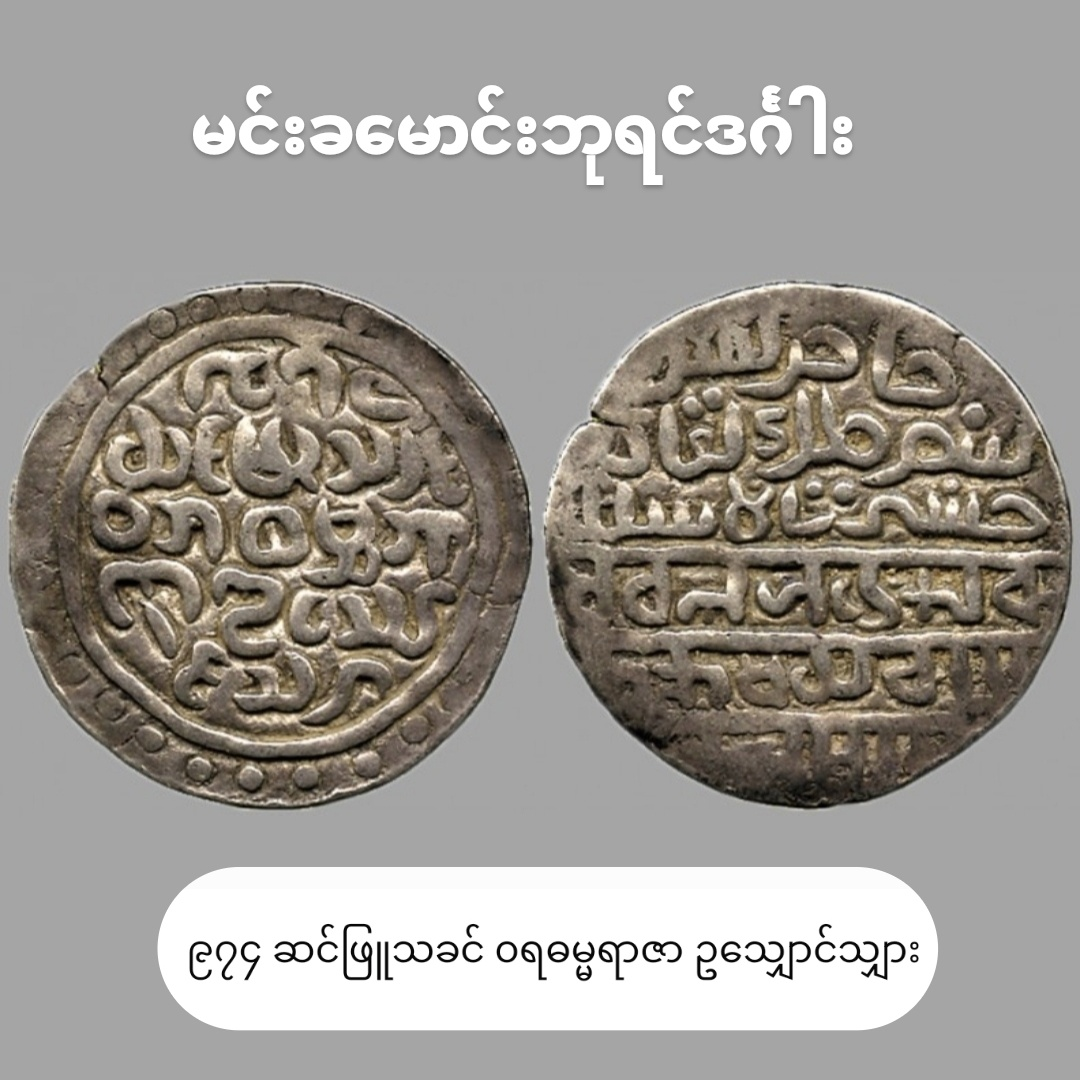
- Silver Coin stamped in King Min Khamaung's reign

King of Arakan
- Reign: 7 July [O.S. 27 June] 1612 – 1 June [O.S. 11 May] 1622
- Coronation: 10th waxing of Waso, 974 ME
- Predecessor: Min Razagyi
- Successor: Thiri Thudhamma
- Born: 1577/1578 (Monday born); Kha Maung Seik (ခမောင်းဆိပ်)
- Died: 1 June [O.S. 11 May] 1622 (aged 45); Saturday, 4th waxing of Nayone 984 ME; Mrauk U
- Consort: Dhamma Déwi II; Shin Htwe; Thupaba Déwi II
- Issue: Thiri Thudhamma; Nat Shin May and many others
Names
- Naradhipati Waradhamma Raza နရာဓိပတိ ဝရဓမ္မရာဇာ Hsinphyushin Waradhamma Hussein Shah ဆင်ဖြူရှင် ဝရဓမ္မ ဥသျှောင်သျှာ Hsinphyuthakhin, Hsinnithakhin Mintaragyi Hussein Shah ဆင်ဖြူသခင်၊ ဆင်နီသခင် မင်းတရားကြီး ဥသျှောင်သျှာ
- House: Min Bin
- Father: Min Razagyi
- Mother: Pyinsala Sanda (ပဉ္စလစန္ဒာ)
- Religion: Theravada Buddhism

Min Khamaung (Arakanese: မင်းခမောင်း; Burmese pronunciation: [mɪ́ɴ kʰa̰ máʊɴ], Arakanese pronunciation: [máɴ kʰa̰ máʊɴ]; 1557 – c. May 1622) was king of Mrauk-U Arakan, a former state in Myanmar (Burma), from 1612 to 1622.

== Early life ==
The future Arakanese (ရခိုင်), Rakhine king, was born to Princess Pyinsala Sanda (ပဥ္စလစန္ဒာ) and Prince Razagyi in Khamaungseit (ခမောင်းဆိပ်) on the banks of the headwaters of the Lemro River. He had a younger sister who was one year his junior. Khamaung and his sister fell in love after living alone together and were married. They had a son, Thiri Thudhamma.

The king was also known as Hussein Shah in neighboring Bengal.

During a war between Taungoo and Arakan, Khamaung was captured by the Portuguese mercenary Filipe de Brito e Nicote and held for ransom until 1603 in exchange for his independence from various Burmese kingdoms. He later managed to escape.

== Reign ==
Min Khamaung succeeded to the throne after his father, Min Razagyi, died in 1612. Mrauk-U Arakan had since fallen into chaos due to Portuguese invasions. Razagyi formed a temporary alliance with the Portuguese mercenary captain Sebastian Gonzales Tibao to fend off the Mughals. However, in 1610, Tibao had betrayed the Arakanese and seized their navy. He began using the navy to raid the coast.

By 1615, Khamaung was able to subdue Tibao and resolve any tensions with the Burmese diplomatically. Khamaung then launched a second attack to retake Bhulua from the Mughals. The governor of Bhulua fled, allowing Arakan to occupy the city. Khamaung and his forces followed the Bhulua garrison to the Dakatia River, where the Arakanese forces were defeated, and Khamaung was captured. Khamaung negotiated for his freedom, promising not to attack Bhulua again in exchange for various resources such as elephants, equipment, and servants.

The subahdar (governor) of Bengal, Qasim Khan, considered the release humane but not in keeping with statesmanlike conduct, as it missed an opportunity to subjugate Arakan. Accordingly, Qasim Khan built up an army and sent an expedition in February 1616 to take Chittagong back from Arakan. Khan's forces quickly launched a siege of the city. Superior Mughal siege weaponry and firepower seemed poised to take Chittagong before the Arakanese army could arrive. However, dissent arose among the besiging force's ranks, stemming from the appointment of a personal officer of the subahdar as the commander of mostly imperial forces. The Arakanese renewed their defense with reinforcements of 10,000 men and cut off the besieging army's supply lines.

After successfully defending Chittagong, Min Khamaung capitalized on his renewed strength by capturing Sandwip back from Tibao with the help of Portuguese mercenaries in late 1617. Regaining the lost navy, he began to raid far into Bengal, as far inland as towns on the Meghna River.

Min Khamaung's military repelled and crushed the last of the Portuguese invasions with the aid of the Dutch East India Company (VOC) in 1625.

== Death ==
The king died on 1 June [O.S. 11 May] 1622, Saturday, 4th waxing of Nayone 984 ME, in Mrauk U at age 45 of natural causes. He was succeeded by his son and heir Min Hari Thiri Thudhamma.

== Bibliography ==
- Harvey, G. E. (1925). History of Burma: From the Earliest Times to 10 March 1824. London: Frank Cass & Co. Ltd.
- Myat Soe, ed. (1964). Myanma Swezon Kyan (in Burmese). Vol. 9 (1 ed.). Yangon: Sarpay Beikman.
- Myint-U, Thant (2006). The River of Lost Footsteps—Histories of Burma. Farrar, Straus and Giroux. ISBN 978-0-374-16342-6.
- Sandamala Linkara, Ashin (1931). Rakhine Yazawinthit Kyan (in Burmese). Vol. 1–2 (1997 ed.). Yangon: Tetlan Sarpay.

Min Khamaung Mrauk-U Kingdom Born: 1577/78 Died: 1 June 1622
Regnal titles
Preceded by Raza II	King of Mrauk-U; 7 July 1612 – 1 June 1622	Succeeded by Thiri Thudhamma
