= Jacques Leider =

Jacques P. Leider
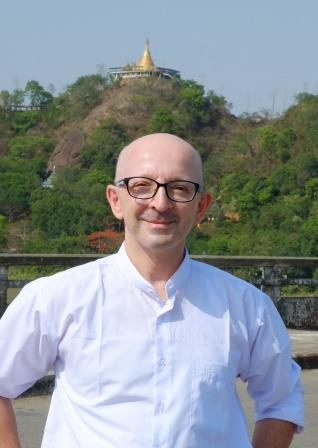
- Leider (2015)
- Born: Jacques Pines Leider; 1962 (age 63–64); Diekirch, Luxembourg
- Education: Paris-Sorbonne University (MA); National Institute of Oriental Languages and Civilizations INALCO (MA),(PhD)
- Scientific career
- Fields: History of Myanmar, History of Rakhine
- Workplaces: Ecole française d’Extrême-Orient EFEO
- Thesis: Le Royaume d’Arakan, Birmanie. Son histoire politique entre le début du XVe et la fin du XVIIe siècle (1998)
- Doctoral advisor: Denise Bernot

Jacques Pierre Leider (French: [ʒak pjɛʁ lɛi̯dər]; born 1962) is a French and Luxembourgish historian, teacher and former diplomat.

He is known for his historical research on Burma/Myanmar, particularly pre-colonial Buddhism, the history of Arakan, today called Rakhine, in the Bay of Bengal and the ethno-historical background of the Burma/Myanmar-Bangladesh borderlands.

In the 1990s, he initiated the research and worldwide interest in the ancient kingdom and city of Mrauk-U in today's northern Rakhine and contributed as an expert to the World Heritage Nomination Dossier for Mrauk U submitted to the UNESCO in 2019.

A notable work is his study and translation of the ”Golden Letter” that King Alaungpaya of Burma has sent to British king George II in 1756. The “Golden Letter” has been added to UNESCO's Memory of the World Register in 2015.

The Canadian journalist Nathan VanderKlippe called Leider “the world’s leading authority on the region’s history”, and the Center for International Law Research and Policy CILRAP referred to him as “perhaps Europe's leading expert on the history of Rakhine”.

Leider became the target of criticism on the online portal change.org during the Rohingya conflict in 2018. The campaign called for the editor of Oxford Research Encyclopedias (ORE) in Asian History to remove him as an author for a planned encyclopedia entry on the Rohingya (see "Open Letter and Online Petition to Oxford University Press" below).

== Early life and educational background ==
Jacques P. Leider was born in Diekirch, Luxembourg, in 1962.

In 1987, he completed a master's degree at the National Institute of Oriental Languages and Civilizations (INALCO) with a study on the history of Arakan in the early 19th century based on manuscripts of the Bibliothèque nationale de France and a master's degree at the Paris-Sorbonne University on Italian, French, and English travelogues on Burma from the 15th to 18th century. In 1988 he started training for Secondary Education Teacher at the Cours Universitaires de Luxembourg and graduated in 1990 with a thesis (Mémoire scientifique) on the post-war army of Luxembourg. During the 1990s, he taught in his native Luxembourg and at Chulalongkorn University, Bangkok, while conducting post-graduate research on the kingdom of Arakan as a doctoral student at INALCO.

In 1998, he defended a doctoral thesis with the title “Le Royaume d’Arakan, Birmanie. Son histoire politique entre le début du XVe et la fin du XVIIe siècle” (The Kingdom of Arakan, Burma. Its Political History from the early 15th to the late 17th Century) at INALCO.

== Academic career and research ==
=== Academic career ===
Since 2001, Jacques P. Leider is affiliated with the Ecole française d’Extrême-Orient (French Institute of Asian Studies) or EFEO in Paris, France and has been in charge of several EFEO research centers in Southeast Asia: Yangon from 2002 to 2006, Chiang Mai from 2008 to 2012, and since 2017 Bangkok and Yangon. In 2002, he established the EFEO Centre in Yangon, where he collected and digitized palm-leaf manuscripts and started to build a database for Arakanese stone inscriptions with Kyaw Minn Htin. In accordance with the French tradition of ethnographic fieldwork, his focus was native, non-canonical Buddhist traditions and texts. During his tenure as head of the EFEO in Chiang Mai, Leider was in charge of the construction of a new building for the EFEO research library, opened in 2011 with approximately 50,000 volumes in the fields of Thai and Southeast Asian Studies, including a collection of periodicals in Thai, English and French. He also initiated the redesign of the center's garden space with rare tropical plants.

From 2013 to 2014, Leider was Counsellor at the Embassy of the Grand-Duchy of Luxembourg in Thailand and Deputy Head of Mission for Malaysia, Laos and Myanmar.

In 2015, he was a senior consultant to the UN in Yangon, Myanmar.

From December 2017 to 2020, he was the scientific coordinator of CRISEA (Competing Regional Integrations in Southeast Asia), an interdisciplinary research project funded by the European Union's Horizon 2020 Framework Programme. He is the author of the final report of the project published in 2021.

=== Academic research ===
Leider's academic research is focused on the political and cultural history of the ancient kingdom of Mrauk U (15th -18th c.), the multi-cultural cosmopolitan life at its court, and on a variety of subjects linked to Myanmar's pre-colonial political and cultural history that highlights the diversity of cultural exchange in the Gulf of Bengal.

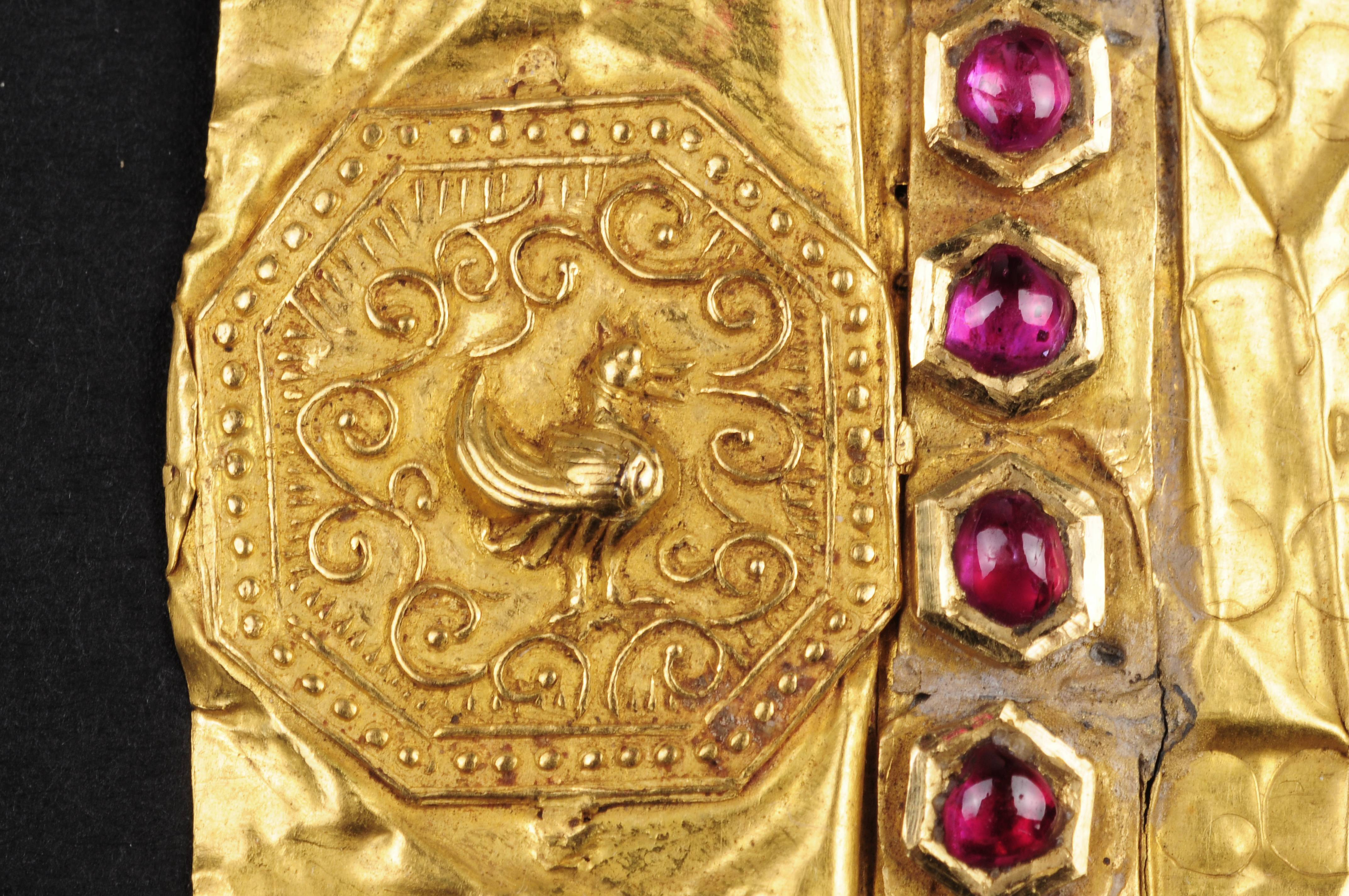
A section of the ”Golden Letter” with mythical bird Hamsa and rubies.

Since the late 1990s, he studied the impact of Islamicization on elite culture in Arakan/Rakhine and the history and background of Buddhist communities in Bangladesh.

His research and publications between 2007 and 2012 contributed to the debate on diplomacy and politics in the 18th century Burma and the emerging Konbaung dynasty. He was commissioned by the Gottfried Wilhelm Leibniz Library in Hanover, Germany, to research the text of a gold sheet, which he identified as the ”Golden Letter” of King Alaungpaya, the founder of the Konbaung dynasty, sent to King George II in 1756. He translated the letter and compared the original with other versions that exist as transcriptions in different archives

Based on his publications since 2012, Leider's current research is focused on the historical background of inter-communal and state-ethnic violence in Rakhine State and the Rakhine-Bangladesh Borderlands including colonial, war-time and post-colonial wrongs, official naming practices of ethnic-religious groups, and political identity formation.

== Open letter and online petition to Oxford University Press ==
In 2018, an undated letter to Oxford University Press (OUP) with 50 signatories and an accompanying change.org petition with 1,689 online supporters requested to drop Jacques Leider as commissioned author of a reference article on the subject of the Rohingya for Oxford Research Encyclopedias (ORE) in Asian History. The letter and petition alleged that Jacques Leider was denying “military-directed mass violence and scorched-earth military operations against the Rohingya community”, was biased against the Rohingya, “critically scrutinized” the Rohingya identity “as a political identity born out of political and communal conflict”, and showed “willful ignorance of irrefutable evidence”; it was also claimed that he was in an advisory relation with Myanmar's military that used him to justify the persecution of the Rohingya. To support their allegations, the initiators of the letter and petition referred to commentaries and interviews and Jacques Leider's participation in a panel discussion “Talk on Rakhine Issue and Security Outlook” on September 8, 2017, in the capital city of Naypyidaw that had been organized by a media company owned by Myanmar's military.

In response to the campaign, Oxford University Press issued an editorial statement declaring that “scholarly integrity lies at the core of Oxford University Press’s mission. The history of the Rohingya is a complex and contentious area of research and, as always, the Press’s goal is to represent this history with accuracy, balance, and sensitivity. Dr. Jacques Leider was commissioned by the editorial board of the Oxford Research Encyclopedia of Asian History based on his subject-matter expertise. The decision on whether to accept his article for publication was informed principally by the outcome of an external peer review exercise and the scholarly assessment of the Press’s editorial board, which is composed of career historians of Asia.”

Leider's article with the title “Rohingya: The History of a Muslim Identity in Myanmar” was published by Oxford Research Encyclopedias, Asian History, in May 2018.

In the footnote of an article published in 2020, Leider referred to the criticism of his research on identity formation explaining that “[p]ost-colonial anthropology looks at ethnic formation differently from the old culturalist models which essentialize ethnic identity (as we find it in the Myanmar constitutions). We need to be able to differentiate ‘ethnification’ (in the tradition of Benedict Anderson's ‘imagined community’) and political struggle, and to understand how they overlap. All ethnic identities are constructed one way or another, and all identities may be used politically, for example when members of one group adopt a term as a unifying device. Sensitivity is in place when there is such a process of coming together or community-formation. I have been criticized for showing lack of such sensitivity in an interview I gave to a Myanmar newspaper in 2012 (The Irrawaddy, “History Behind Arakan State Conflict”, 9 July 2012). It should probably be pointed out that I was not afforded an opportunity to review the draft of the article before it was published, and the newspaper re-published it twice without requesting or obtaining my agreement.”

== Bibliography ==
the bibliography is not complete, please help to expand it

Jacques P. Leider

- 2023. The Arakan Army. Challenges for Rakhine State’s Rising Ethnonational Force, in Hoang Thi Ha and Daljit Singh (eds.),Southeast Asian Affairs 2023. Singapore. Institute of Southeast Asian Studies, 217-234.
- 2023. Colonial Prejudice and Discrimination Predicating Post-Colonial Hate Speech, in Morten Bergsmo and Kishan Manocha (eds.), Religion, Hateful Expression and Violence. Brussels. Torkel Opsahl Academic EPublisher, 733-760. ISBN 978-82-8348-141-9 print ISBN 978-82-8348-142-6 e-book. PURL: https://www.toaep.org/ps-pdf/41-bergsmo-manocha/.
- 2023. Violence and Belonging. Conflict, War and Insecurity in Arakan, 1942-1952, in Jayeel Cornelio and Volker Grabowsky (eds.), Regional Identities in Southeast Asia. Contemporary Challenges, Historical Fractures. Chiang Mai. Silkworm Books, 347-371.
- 2022. The Arakan Army, Rakhine State and the Promise of Arakan’s Independence. TOAEP Policy Brief Series No.128. Brussels. Torkel Opsahl Academic EPublisher. ISBN 978-82-8348-148-8. PURL: https://www.toaep.org/pbs-pdf/128-leider/. LTD-PURL: https://www.legal-tools.org/doc/3dh1dq/.
- 2020. The Archival Heritage on Maritime Exchanges in the Northeast Bay of Bengal. Taking Stock of History of the Northeast Bay of Bengal and Coastal Core Region, in Li Minghua 李明华 (ed.), Research on Safeguarding and Increasing Access to the Documentary Heritage of Silk Roads 丝绸之路 --- 文献遗产保护和利用研究. Xiamen. Fujian People’s Publishing House, 195-222.
- 2020. Rohingya. The Foundational Years. TOAEP Policy Brief Series No.123. Brussels. Torkel Opsahl Academic EPublisher. ISBN 978-82-8348-161-7. PURL: https://www.toaep.org/pbs-pdf/123-leider/.
- 2020. The Chittagonians in Colonial Arakan. Seasonal and Settlement Migrations, in Morten Bergsmo, Wolfgang Kaleck and Kyaw Yin Hlaing (eds.), Colonial Wrongs and Access to International Law. Brussels. Torkel Opsahl Academic EPublisher, 177–227. ISBN 978-82-8348-134-1. PURL: https://www.legal-tools.org/doc/gkdla9/pdf.
- 2020. Territorial Dispossession and Persecution in North Arakan (Rakhine) 1942-43. TOAEP Policy Brief Series No.101. Brussels. Torkel Opsahl Academic EPublisher. ISBN 978-82-8348-086-3. PURL: http://www.toaep.org/pbs-pdf/101-leider/.
- 2020. Mass Departures in the Rakhine-Bangladesh Borderlands. TOAEP Policy Brief Series No.111. Brussels. Torkel Opsahl Academic EPublisher. ISBN 978-82-8348-095-5. PURL: http://www.toaep.org/pbs-pdf/111-leider/.
- 2019. The Golden Letter of King Alaungphaya to King George II of Great Britain (1756) (With Translations into English, French and German), UNESCO Memory of the World Sub-Committee on Education and Research, Newsletter 1: 4-14.
- 2019. From Aracan Mahomedans to Muslim Rohingyas – Towards an archive of naming practices, in Surakarn Thoesomboon and Aurapin Khamson (eds.), สุรกานต์ โตสมบุญ และ อรพินท์ คำสอน (บรรณาธิการ). อดีต ตัวตน กับความจริงแท้ของชาติพันธุ์ ศิลปะ และโบราณคดี. กรุงเทพฯ: ศูนย์มานุษยวิทยาสิรินธร (องค์การมหาชน), 2561 (Past Identity and Authenticity of Ethnology Art and Archaeology). Bangkok. Princess Maha Chakri Sirindhorn Anthropology Centre, 213–270.
- with Kyaw Minn Htin 2018. The Epigraphic Archive of Arakan/Rakhine State (Myanmar): A Survey, in Writing for Eternity: A Survey of Epigraphy in Southeast Asia. Paris. Publications de l’École française d’Extrême-Orient, 73–85.
- 2018. History and Victimhood: Engaging with Rohingya Issues, Insight Turkey 20,1: 99-118.
- 2018. Rohingya: The History of a Muslim Identity in Myanmar, in David Ludden (ed.), Oxford Research Encyclopedia of Asian History. New York. Oxford University Press. DOI: 10.1093/acrefore/9780190277727.013.115.
- 2018. Rohingya – the Name and its Living Archive, ASEAN Focus 2: 16–17.
- 2017. Conflict and Mass Violence in Arakan (Rakhine State): The 1942 Events and Political Identity Formation, in Ashley South and Marie Lall (eds.), Citizenship in Myanmar. Ways of Being in and from Burma. ISEAS/ CMU, 193–221.
- 2017. Mapping Burma and Northern Thailand in 1795. Francis Hamilton's Critical Accounts of Native Maps, in Peter Skilling and Justin Thomas McDaniel (eds.), Imagination and Narrative. Lexical and Cultural Translation in Buddhist Asia. Chiang Mai. Silkworm Books, 117–159.
- 2017. Transmutations of the Rohingya Movement in the Post-2012 Rakhine State Crisis, in Ooi Keat Gin and Volker Grabowsky (eds.), Ethnic and Religious Identities and Integration in Southeast Asia. Chiang Mai. Silkworm Books, 191–239.
- 2016. A Rakhine monk from Bangladesh: Ashin Bodhinyana, in Mark Rowe, Jeffrey Samuels, and Justin McDaniel (eds.), Figures of Buddhist Modernity. Honolulu. University of Hawaii Press, 46–48.
- 2016. Competing Identities and the Hybridized History of the Rohingyas, in Rita Faraj and Omar Bashir Al Turabi (eds.), Major Muslim Crises. History, Memory, and Recruitment. Dubai. Al Mesbar Centre, 83–92.
- 2015. Background and Prospects in the Buddhist-Muslim Dissensions in Rakhine State of Myanmar, in K.M.de Silva (ed.), Ethnic Conflict in Buddhist Societies in South and Southeast Asia The Politics Behind Religious Rivalries. Kandy. International Centre for Ethnic Studies, 25–55.
- 2015. Competing Identities and the Hybridized History of the Rohingyas, in Renaud Egreteau and Francois Robinne (eds.), Metamorphosis. Studies in Social and Political Change in Myanmar. Singapore. NUS Press, 151–78. JSTOR j.ctv1ntgbt
- with Kyaw Minn Htin 2015. King Man Co Mvan's Exile in Bengal: Legend, History and Context, Journal of Burma Studies, 19, 2 (December), 371–405.
- 2015. Myanmar and the Outside World, in Sylvia Fraser-Lu and Donald M. Stadtner (eds), Buddhist Art of Myanmar. New York. Asia Society Museum in Association with Yale University Press, New Haven, and London, 35–43.
- 2015. Politics of Integration and Cultures of Resistance. A Study of Burma's Conquest and Administration of Arakan, in Geoffrey Wade (ed.), Asian Expansions The Historical Experiences of Polity Expansion in Asia. London. Routledge, 184–213.
- 2013. Rohingya. The name, the movement, the quest for identity, in Myanmar Peace Center (ed.), Nation Building in Myanmar. Yangon. Myanmar EGRESS/Myanmar Peace Center, 204–255.
- 2012. Domination and Dereliction: Exploring the State's Roles in Burma, Journal of Asian Studies 71.2: 361–70.
- 2012. The Rise of Alaungmintaya, King of Myanmar (1752–60). Buddhist Constituents of a Political Metamorphosis, in Peter Skilling and Justin McDaniel (eds.), Buddhist Narrative in Asia and Beyond. Bangkok: Chulalongkorn University, Institute of Thai Studies, Vol.1: 111–126.
- 2012, ’Rohingya’, Rakhaing and the Recent Outbreak of Violence - A Note, Bulletin of the Burma Studies Group, Nos.89/90: 8-11, <https://www.niu.edu/clas/burma/publications/Bulletins/PDFs/bulletin89.pdf>
- with Thibaut d’Hubert 2011. Traders and Poets at the Mrauk-U court. On Commerce and Cultural Links in Seventeenth-Century Arakan, in Rila Mukherjee (ed.), Pelagic Passageways. The Northern Bay of Bengal Before Colonialism. Delhi. Primus Books, 77-111.
- 2010. Southeast Asian Buddhist Monks in the Peregrinação. Tracing the 'Rolins' of Fernão Mendes Pinto in the Eastern Bay of Bengal, in Jorge M. dos Santos Alves (ed.), Fernão Mendes Pinto and the Peregrinação. Studies, Restored Text, Notes and Indexes. Lisbonne. Fundação Oriente et Imprensa Nacional-Casa da Moeda, Vol. 1: 145–162.
- 2009. King Alaungmintaya’s Golden Letter to King George II (7 May 1756). The Story of an Exceptional Manuscript and the Failure of a Diplomatic Overture. Hannover. Gottfried Wilhelm Leibniz Bibliothek. <https://noa.gwlb.de/receive/mir_mods_00000008>
- 2008. Forging Buddhist Credentials as a Tool of Legitimacy and Ethnic Identity. A Study of Arakan's Subjection in Nineteenth-Century Burma, Journal of the Economic and Social History of the Orient 51, 3: 409–459.
- 2006. Araññavasi and Gamavasi Monks - Towards Further Study of Variant Forms of Buddhist Monasticism in Myanmar, in François Lagirarde and Paritta Chalermpow Koanantakool (eds.), Buddhist Legacies in Mainland Southeast Asia Mentalities, Interpretations and Practices. Bangkok. Princess Mahachakri Sirindhorn Anthropology Centre, 113–37.
- 2005. The emergence of Rakhine historiography. A challenge for Myanmar Historical Research, in Myanmar Historical Commission (ed.), Myanmar Historical Commission Conference Proceedings, Yangon. Part 2: 38–59.
- 2005. Buddhist Kings with Muslim names. A Discussion of Muslim Influence in the Mrauk U period, Arakanese Research Journal 3: 99-134.
- 2004. The Min Rajagri Satam of Mahazeya-thein. Making a ‘history’ for the King,” in Myanmar Historical Commission (ed.), Traditions of Knowledge in Southeast Asia. Yangon, Myanmar Historical Commission Golden Jubilee Publication Committee, Part 1: 100-120.
- 2004. Le Royaume d’Arakan, Birmanie, Son histoire politique entre le début du XVe et la fin du XVIIe siècle, Paris, Publications de l’EFEO.
- 2004. Text, Lineage and Tradition in Burma – The Struggle for Norms and Religious Legitimacy under King Bodawphaya (1752-1819), Journal of Burma Studies 9: 80-127.
- 2004. L’Islam Birman en Danger de Radicalisation, Les Cahiers de l’Orient Revue d’étude et de réflexion sur le monde arabe et musulman 78 : 125-138.
- 2003. Arakan around 1830 – Social Distress and Political Instability in the Early British Period, Arakanese Research Journal (Bangladesh) 2: 5-24.
- with J. Gommans (eds.) 2002. The Maritime Frontier of Burma. Exploring Political, Cultural and Commercial Interaction in the Indian Ocean World, 1200-1800. Amsterdam. Koninklijke Nederlandse Akademie van Wetenschappen/ Leiden, KITLV Press.
- 2002. Arakan's Ascent during the Mrauk U Period, in Sunait Chutintaranond and Chris Baker (eds.), Recalling Local Pasts Autonomous History in Southeast Asia, Chiang Mai, Silkworm Books, 53-87.
- 2001. Notes on the Armed Forces of the Arakanese Kings (1570-1630), Arakanese Research Journal (Bangladesh) 1: 5-17.
- 1999. An Account of Arakan written at Islaamabad (Chittagong) in June 1777 by Major R.E. Roberts. Présentation et commentaire,” Aséanie 3: 125–149.
- 1998. These Buddhist Kings with Muslim names – A Discussion of Muslim Influence in the Mrauk U period, in EFEO (ed.), Etudes Birmanes en Hommage à Denise Bernot. Paris. EFEO, 189–215.
- 1995. Between Revolt and Normalcy. Arakan after the Burmese Conquest, Rakhaing Magazine 2:12-18.
- 1994. La Route de Am. Contribution à l’Etude d’une Route Terrestre entre la Birmanie et le Golfe du Bengale, Journal Asiatique 282: 335–370.
