= Rakhine language =

Sino-Tibetan language spoken in Myanmar

Rakhine
- Arakanese
- ရက္ခိုင်ဘာသာ
- Pronunciation: IPA: [ɹəkʰàɪɴ bàθà]
- Native to: Myanmar, Bangladesh, India
- Region: Rakhine State and other parts of Myanmar; Chittagong Hill Tracts, Patuakhali, Cox Bazar (Bangladesh); Tripura (India)
- Ethnicity: Rakhine, Marma, Kamein
- Native speakers: 1 million (2011–2013); 1 million second language speakers in Myanmar (2013)
- Language family: Sino-Tibetan: Tibeto-Burman; Lolo-Burmese; Burmish; Burmese; Rakhine
- Dialects: Ramree; Marma
- Writing system: Burmese script

Language codes
- ISO 639-3: Either: rki – Rakhine ("Arakanese") rmz – Marma
- Glottolog: arak1255
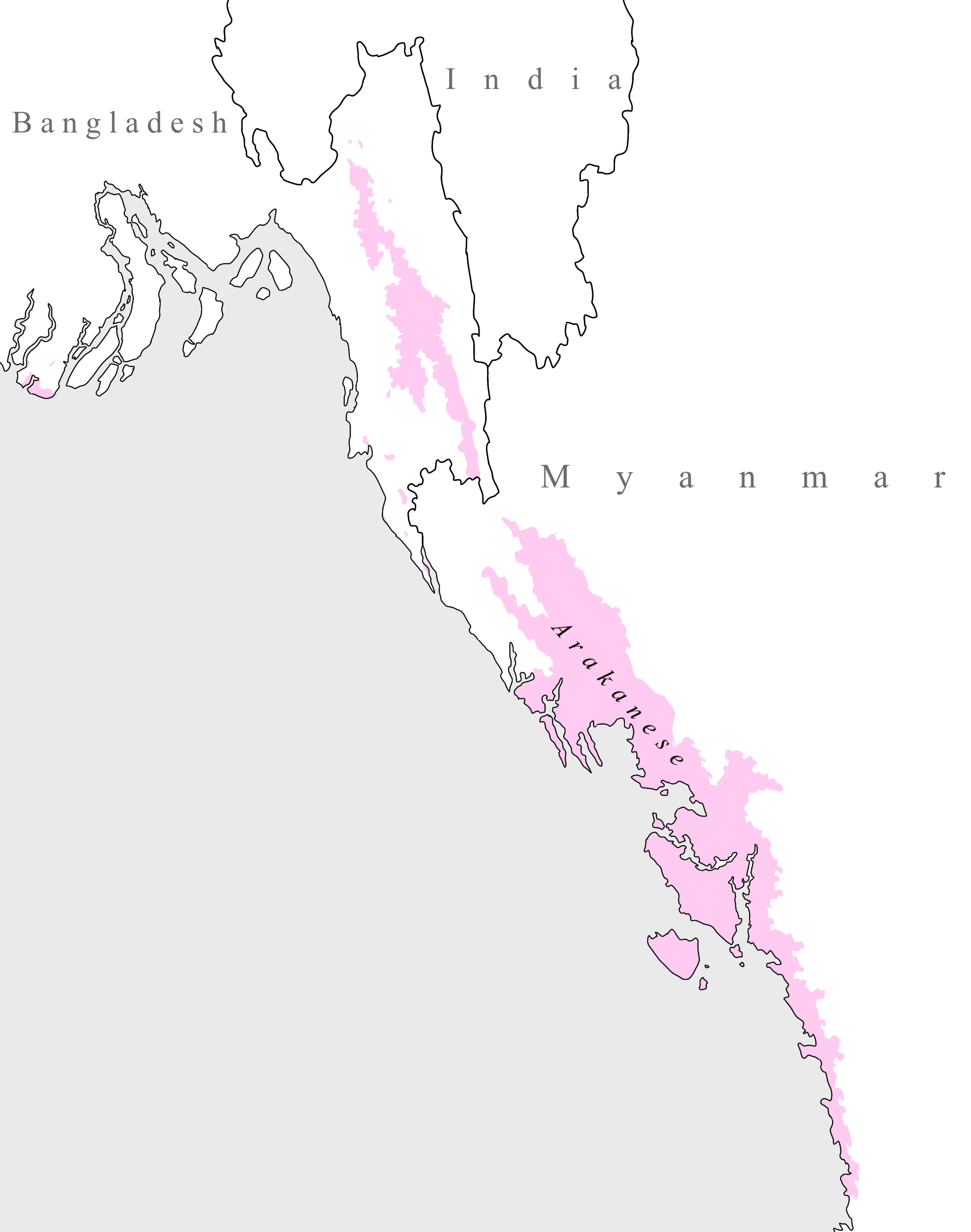
- Map of where the Rakhine language is spoken

Rakhine (/rəˈkaɪn/; Rakhine: ရခိုင်ဘာသာ, MLCTS: ra.hkuing batha Burmese pronunciation: [ɹəkʰàɪɴ bàθà]), also known as Arakanese, is a Tibeto-Burman language spoken in western Myanmar, primarily in the Rakhine State, parts of south-eastern Bangladesh and parts of southern Tripura in India. Closely related to Burmese, the language is spoken by the Rakhine and Marma peoples; it is estimated to have around one million native speakers and it is spoken as a second language by a further million.

Though Arakanese has some similarity with standard Burmese, Burmese speakers find it difficult to communicate with Arakanese speakers. Thus, it is often considered to be a dialect or variety of Burmese. As there are no universally accepted criteria for distinguishing a language from a dialect, scholars and other interested parties often disagree about the linguistic, historical and social status of Arakanese. There are three dialects of Arakanese: Sittwe–Marma (about two thirds of speakers), Ramree, and Thandwe.

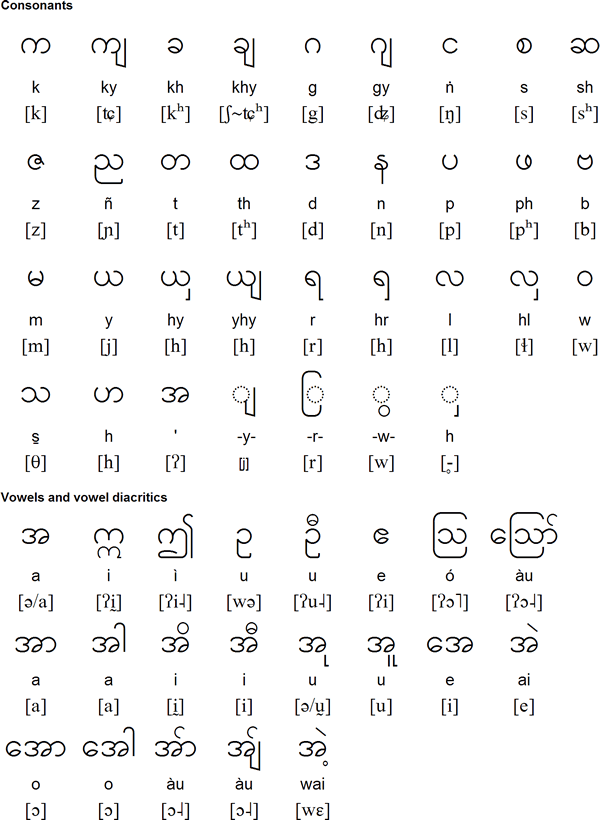
Arakanese or the Rakhine language alphabets

== Vocabulary ==
While Arakanese and Standard Burmese share the majority of lexicon, Arakanese has numerous vocabulary differences. Some are native words with no cognates in Standard Burmese, like 'sarong' (လုံခြည် in Standard Burmese, ဒယော in Arakanese). Others are loan words from Bengali, English, and Hindi, not found in Standard Burmese. An example is 'hospital', which is called ဆေးရုံ in Standard Burmese, but is called သိပ်လှိုင် (pronounced [θeɪʔ l̥àɪɴ]/[ʃeɪʔ l̥àɪɴ]) in Arakanese, from English sick lines. Other words simply have different meanings (e.g., 'afternoon', ညစ in Arakanese and ညနေ in Standard Burmese). Moreover, some archaic words in Standard Burmese are preferred in Arakanese. An example is the first person pronoun, which is အကျွန် in Arakanese (not ကျွန်တော်, as in Standard Burmese). A more unique difference is the 'Hra' sound which is not found in Burmese: only in Arakanese. e.g. ဟြာ(Hra/Seek) and Hraa(ဟြား/exceptional/excellent/very good/smart).

=== Comparison ===
A gloss of vocabulary differences between Standard Burmese and Arakanese is below:

English	Standard Burmese	Arakanese	Notes
thirsty	ရေဆာ	ရီမွတ်	
go	သွား	လား	Arakanese for 'go' was historically used in Standard Burmese.
kick a ball	ဘောလုံးကန်	ဘောလုံးကျောက်	
stomach ache	ဗိုက်နာ	ဝမ်းနာ	Arakanese prefers ဝမ်း to Standard Burmese ဗိုက် for 'stomach'.
guava	မာလကာသီး	ဂိုယံသီး	Standard Burmese for 'guava' is derived from the word Malacca, whereas Arakanese for 'guava' is from Spanish guayaba, from Taino: guayaba.
papaya	သင်္ဘောသီး	ပဒကာသီး	Standard Burmese for 'papaya' literally means 'boat'.
soap	ဆပ်ပြာ	သူပုန်	From Portuguese "sabão". In Standard Burmese, 'သူပုန်' means 'rebel' or 'insurgent'.
superficial	အပေါ်ယံ	အထက်ပေါ်ရီ	
blanket	စောင်	ပုဆိုး	ပုဆိုး in Standard Burmese refers to the men's longyi (sarong).
dark	မှောင်	မိုက်	The compound word မှောင်မိုက် ('pitch dark') is used in both Standard Burmese and Arakanese.
pick a flower	ပန်းခူး	ပန်းဆွတ်	The compound word ဆွတ်ခူး ('pick') is used in both Standard Burmese and Arakanese.
wash [clothes]	လျှော်	ဖွပ်	The compound word လျှော်ဖွပ် ('wash') is used in both Standard Burmese and Arakanese.

== Phonology ==
The phonological system described here is the inventory of sounds, represented using the International Phonetic Alphabet (IPA).

=== Consonants ===
The consonants of Arakanese are:

Consonant phonemes
		Bilabial	Dental/Alveolar		Post-al./ Palatal	Velar	Glottal
		Bilabial	central	sibilant	Post-al./ Palatal	Velar	Glottal
Nasal	voiced	m	n		ɲ	ŋ	
Nasal	voiceless	m̥	n̥		ɲ̊	ŋ̊	
Plosive	voiced	b	d		dʒ	ɡ	
Plosive	voiceless	p	t		tʃ	k	ʔ
Plosive	aspirated	pʰ	tʰ		tʃʰ	kʰ	
Fricative	voiced			z			
Fricative	voiceless		θ	s	ʃ		h
Fricative	aspirated			sʰ			h
Lateral	voiced		l				
Lateral	voiceless		l̥				
Approximant	voiced		ɹ		j	w	
Approximant	voiceless		ɹ̥			ʍ	

Arakanese largely shares the same set of consonant phonemes as standard Burmese, though Arakanese more prominently uses /ɹ/, which has largely merged to /j/ in standard Burmese (with some exceptions). Because Arakanese has preserved the /ɹ/ sound, the /-ɹ-/ medial (which is preserved in writing in Standard Burmese with the diacritic ြ) is still distinguished in the following Arakanese consonant clusters: /ɡɹ- kɹ- kʰɹ- ŋɹ- ŋ̊ɹ- pɹ- pʰɹ- bɹ- mɹ- m̥ɹ- hɹ-/. For example, the word "blue," spelt ပြာ, is pronounced /pjà/ in standard Burmese, but pronounced /pɹà/ in Arakanese. Moreover, there is less voicing in Arakanese than in Standard Burmese, occurring only when the consonant is unaspirated. Unlike in Burmese, voicing never shifts from [θ] to [ð].

=== Vowels ===
The vowels of Arakanese are:

	Monophthongs			Diphthongs	
	Front	Central	Back	Front offglide	Back offglide
Close	i		u		
Close-mid	e	ə	o	ei	ou
Open-mid	ɛ	ə	ɔ		
Open		a		ai	au

While Arakanese shares the same set of vowels as Burmese, Arakanese rhymes also diverge from Standard Burmese for a number of open syllables and closed syllables. For instance, Arakanese has also merged various vowel sounds, such as ဧ ([e]) to ဣ ([i]). Hence, a word like 'blood', which is spelt သွေး, pronounced ([θwé]) in standard Burmese, is pronounced [θwí] in Arakanese. Similarly, Arakanese has a number of closed syllable rhymes that do not exist in Standard Burmese, including /-ɛɴ -ɔɴ -ɛʔ -ɔʔ/.

The Arakanese dialect also has a higher frequency of open vowels weakening to /ə/ than Standard Burmese. An example is the word for 'salary', (လခ), which is [la̰ɡa̰] in standard Burmese, but [ləkʰa̰] in Arakanese.

== Differences from standard Burmese ==
The following is a summary of consonantal, vowel and rhyme differences from Standard Burmese found in the Arakanese dialect:

Written Burmese	Standard Burmese	Arakanese	Notes
-စ်	/-ɪʔ/	/-aɪʔ/	e.g. စစ် 'genuine' and စိုက် 'plant' are both pronounced [saɪʔ] in Arakanese
ိုက်	/-aɪʔ/	/-aɪʔ/	
-က်	-ɛʔ	-ɔʔ	
-ဉ်	/-ɪɴ/	/-aɪɴ/	e.g. ဥယျာဉ် 'garden', from Standard Burmese [ṵ jɪ̀ɴ] → [wəjàɪɴ]. Irregular rhyme, with various pronunciations. In some words, it is /-ɛɴ/ (e.g. ဝိညာဉ် 'soul', from Standard Burmese [wèɪɴ ɲɪ̀ɴ] → [wḭ ɲɛ̀ɴ]). In a few words, it is /-i -e/ (e.g. ညှဉ်း 'to oppress', from Standard Burmese [ɲ̥ɪ́ɴ] → [ɲ̥í, ɲ̥é]).
ိုင်	/-aɪɴ/	/-aɪɴ/	
-င်	/-ɪɴ/	/-ɔɴ/	
-န် ွန်	/-aɴ -ʊɴ/	/-ɔɴ/	ွန် is /-wɔɴ/
-ည်	/-i, -e, -ɛ/	/-e/	A few exceptions are pronounced /-aɪɴ/, like ကြည် 'clear', pronounced [kɹàɪɴ]
-ေ	/-e/	/-i/	e.g. ချီ 'carry' and ချေ 'cancel' are pronounced [tɕʰì] and [tɕʰè] respectively in Standard Burmese, but merged to [tɕʰì] in Arakanese
-တ် ွတ်	/-aʔ -ʊʔ/	/-aʔ/	
ိန်	/-eɪɴ/	/-ɪɴ/	
-ုန်	/-oʊɴ/	/-ʊɴ/	
Nasal initial + -ီ Nasal initial + -ေ	/-i/	/-eɪɴ/	e.g. နီ 'red' is [nì] in Standard Burmese, but [nèɪɴ] in Arakanese; In some words, the rhyme is unchanged from the standard rhyme (e.g. မြေ 'land', usually pronounced [mɹì], not [mɹèɪɴ], or အမိ 'mother', usually pronounced [əmḭ], not [əmḛɪɴ]); There are few exceptions where the nasal rhyme is /-eɪɴ-/ even without a nasal initial (e.g. သီ 'thread', from Standard Burmese [θì] → [θèɪɴ]).
Nasal initial + -ု -ူ -ူး	/-u/	/-oʊɴ/	e.g. နု 'tender' is [nṵ] in Standard Burmese, but [no̰ʊɴ] in Arakanese
ွား	/-wá/	/-ɔ́/	e.g. ဝါး 'bamboo' is [wá] in Standard Burmese, but [wɔ́] in Arakanese
ြွ	/-w-/	/-ɹw-/	Occurs in some words (e.g. မြွေ 'snake' is [mwè] in Standard Burmese, but [mɹwèɪɴ] in Arakanese)
ရှ-	/ʃ-/	/hɹ-/	
ချ-	/tɕʰ-/	/ʃ-/	Occasionally occurs (e.g. ချင် 'to want' is [tɕʰɪ̀ɴ] in Standard Burmese, but [ʃɔ̀ɴ]~[tɕʰɔ̀ɴ] in Arakanese)
တ- → ရ-	/t- d-/	/ɹ-/	e.g. The present tense particle တယ် ([dɛ̀]) corresponds with ရယ် ([ɹɛ̀]) in Arakanese e.g. The plural particle တို့ ([do̰]) corresponds with ရို့ ([ɹo̰]) in Arakanese
ရှ- ယှ- ယျှ-	/ʃ-/	/h-/	Found in some words only
-ယ် ဲ	-ɛ	-e	

Written	အမေက	သင်္ကြန်ပွဲတွင်	ဝတ်ရန်	ထဘီ	ရှစ်ထည်	ပေးလိုက်ပါ	ဆိုသည်။
Standard Burmese	ʔəmè ɡa̰	ðədʒàɴ pwɛ́ dwɪ̀ɴ	wʊʔ jàɴ	tʰəmèɪɴ	ʃɪʔ tʰɛ̀	pé laɪʔ pà	sʰò dɛ̀
Arakanese	ʔəmì ɡa̰	θɔ́ɴkràɴ pwé hmà	waʔ pʰo̰	dəjɔ̀	ʃaɪʔ tʰè	pí laʔ pà	sʰò ɹì
Arakanese (written)	အမိက	သင်္ကြန်ပွဲမှာ	ဝတ်ဖို့	ဒယော	ရှစ်ထည်	ပီးလတ်ပါ	ဆိုရယ်။
Gloss
English	Mother says "Give me eight pasos for wearing during the Thingyan festival."						

== Writing system ==
Arakanese is written using the Burmese script, which descends from Southern Brahmi. Rakhine speakers are taught Rakhine pronunciations using written Burmese, while most Marma speakers are only literate in Bengali.

The first extant Arakanese inscriptions, the Launggrak Taung Maw inscription and the Mahathi Crocodile Rock inscription (1356), date to the 1300s, and the epigraphic record of Arakanese inscriptions is unevenly distributed between the 1400s to 1800s. In the early 1400s, Arakanese inscriptions began to transition from the square letters associated with stone inscriptions (kyauksa), to rounder letters that is now standard for the Burmese script. This coincided with developments in Arakanese literature, which was stimulated by the rise of Mrauk U during the 1400s.

What is now Rakhine State is home to Sanskrit inscriptions that date from the first millennium to the 1000s. These inscriptions were written in Northern Brahmic scripts (namely Siddham or Gaudi), which are ancestral to the Bengali script. However, these inscriptions are not ancestral to Arakanese epigraphy, which uses the Mon–Burmese script. While some Arakanese have coined the term "Rakkhawunna" (Rakkhavaṇṇa) to describe a script that predates the usage of written Burmese, there is no contemporary lithic evidence to support the existence of such a script.

== Dialect variations ==
Contemporary Rakhine exhibits considerable regional variation. Dialects differ across areas such as Sittwe (southern), Kula-taung, Myit Wa, Chaungtha (upper river), and among historical Rakhine populations in present-day Bangladesh and India. Even within Rakhine State, towns such as Kyaukphyu, Ramree, Mrauk-U, Thandwe, Ann, and Pauktaw show geographical dialectal variation. Coastal areas closer to central Burma, including Thandwe and Taungup, tend to exhibit softer tones and pronunciations influenced by proximity to Burmese-speaking regions.

Rakhine is often described in literature as a "purer" or "more ancient" form of Burmese. This claim is based on certain phonological features retained in Rakhine but lost in Standard Burmese, such as distinctions between Written Burmese r and y, and between aŋ and añ. Rakhine also merges rhymes such as at and an with wat and wan, and exhibits less extensive voicing.

Conversely, Standard Burmese preserves distinctions—such as between ac, añ and uik, uir, or wa and o—that have been lost in Rakhine. It also tends to preserve vowel clarity and shows less phonetic weakening.
