= Syed Najibul Bashar Maizbhandari =

Bangladeshi politician

- সৈয়দ নজিবুল বশর মাইজভাণ্ডারী
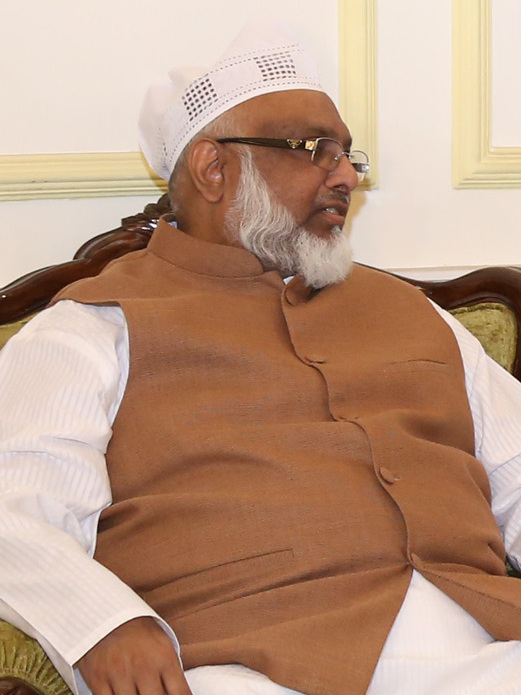

Member of the Bangladesh Parliament for Chittagong-2
- In office 5 January 2014 – 6 January 2024
- Preceded by: Salahuddin Quader Chowdhury
- Succeeded by: Khadizatul Anwar

Member of Parliament for Chittagong-4
- In office 1991–1996
- Preceded by: Mazharul Haq Shah Chowdhury
- Succeeded by: Rafiqul Anwar

Chairman of Bangladesh Tarikat Federation
- Incumbent
- Assumed office 2005

Personal details
- Born: 2 December 1959 (age 66) Chittagong, East Pakistan
- Party: Bangladesh Tarikat Federation
- Other political affiliations: Awami League (until 1996); Bangladesh Nationalist Party (1996–2005)
- Relatives: Syed Gulamur Rahman Maizbhandari (grandfather)
Syed Najibul Bashar Maizbhandari
Religious life
- Religion: Islam
- Denomination: Sunni
- Jurisprudence: Hanafi
- Tariqa: Maizbhandari
Muslim leader
- Influenced by: Ahmad Ullah Maizbhandari

Syed Najibul Bashar Maizbhandari (Bengali: সৈয়দ নজিবুল বশর মাইজভাণ্ডারী; born 2 December 1959) is the chairman of Bangladesh Tarikat Federation and former Member of Parliament of the Chittagong-2 constituency.

== Early life ==
Syed Najibul Bashar Maizbhandari was born on 2 December 1959, to a Bengali Muslim Syed family of saintly heritage belonging to the Maizbhandaria Tariqah in Fatikchhari, Chittagong District, East Pakistan (now Bangladesh). He is a son of the Sufi Peer Syed Shafiul Bashar Maizbhandari, who himself is the son of Syed Ghulamur Rahman Maizbhandari. His mother is Syeda Ashrafunnesa Begum. His ancestors migrated from Medina to Gaur, the former capital of medieval Bengal, via Baghdad and Delhi. Maizbhandari's recent lineage is as follows: Syed Najibul Bashar, son of Syed Shafiul Bashar, son of Syed Ghulamur Rahman, son of Syed Abdul Karim Shah, son of Syed Tayyabullah, son of Syed Abdul Qadir, son of Syed Hamiduddin. Hamiduddin was the appointed Imam and Qadi of Gaur, who moved to Patiya in Chittagong District due to an epidemic. Syed Abdul Qadir was appointed the Imam of Azimnagar in Fatikchhari.

Maizbhandari gained his Higher Secondary School Certificate.

== Career ==
During the 1991 Bangladeshi general elections, Maizbhandari won a seat in the Chittagong-4 constituency as an Awami League candidate. However, he later became affiliated with the Bangladesh Nationalist Party. He represented them as a candidate for the same constituency in the 2001 Bangladeshi general election, but did not win a seat.

In 1997, BNP Chairperson Begum Khaleda Zia declared him the convener of the party's ulama organization, the Jatiotabadi Ulama Dal

He left the Bangladesh Nationalist Party in 2005 because the party had formed an alliance with the Jamaat-e-Islami, which Maizbhandari accuses of supporting terrorists who attack dargahs (Sufi shrines); Maizbhandari is the president of the Bangladesh Dargah Mazar Federation, an association of shrines. In the same year, he founded the Bangladesh Tarikat Federation political party which had experienced its first elections in 2008 with 45 candidates but no seats won in parliament.

On 5 January 2014, Maizbhandari won a seat in the Chittagong-2 representing his party and kept this seat again in the 2018 Bangladeshi general election. He is the Chairman of Bangladesh Tarikat Federation, ailed of the Awami League.
