= ABM Abul Kashem =

Bangladeshi politician

- এ বি এম আবুল কাসেম

Member of Parliament
- In office 6 January 2009 – 28 January 2014
- Preceded by: L. K. Siddiqi
- Succeeded by: Didarul Alam
- Constituency: Chittagong-4
- In office 23 June 1996 – 15 July 2001
- Preceded by: L. K. Siddiqi
- Succeeded by: L. K. Siddiqi
- Constituency: Chittagong-2

Personal details
- Born: 1934 Chittagong District, Bengal Province
- Died: 24 November 2015 (Aged 80) Dhaka, Bangladesh
- Party: Bangladesh Awami League
- Children: SM Al Mamun (son)

ABM Abul Kashem was a Bangladesh Awami League politician and member of parliament for Chittagong-2 and Chittagong-4.

== Career ==
Kashem was elected to parliament in 2008 from Chittagong-3 as a Bangladesh Awami League candidate. He served as the chairman of the parliamentary committee for the Ministry of Commerce.

=== Controversy ===
Kashem's son, SM Al Mamun, tried to grab land from ship breaking companies in Sitakunda Upazila for his ship breaking company, Unique Ship-breaking Yard, on 7 October 2009. His son also assaulted journalists trying to cover the incident. Kashem later apologized for his son's actions.

== Electoral history ==
General Election 2008: Chittagong-4
Party	Candidate	Votes	%	±%
AL	ABM Abul Kashem	136,298	54.4	+18.5
BNP	Aslam Chowdhury	112,930	45.0	−18.8
CPB	Md. Macheuddulla	850	0.3	N/A
National People's Party	Kazi Mohammal Eusuf Alam	435	0.2	N/A
Independent	Sachindra Lal Dey	213	0.1	N/A
Majority		23,368	9.3	−18.6
Turnout		250,726	81.8	+14.0
AL gain from BNP				

== Death ==
Kashem died on 24 November 2015 in Square Hospital, Dhaka, Bangladesh.
