= Mostafa–Hakim Group =

Bangladeshi diversified conglomerate

Mostafa-Hakim Group
- Native name: মোস্তফা হাকিম গ্রুপ
- Type: Private
- Industry: Steel; Textile Mills; Real Estate; Cement; Brick; Ship breaking Shipping; Fisheries; Oxygen
- Founded: 1984; 42 years ago
- Founder: Abdul Hakim
- Headquarters: 218, D.T Road Dewanhat, Chittagong, Bangladesh
- Area served: Bangladesh
- Key people: Abu Taher (Chairman); M. Manjur Alam (Managing Director); Didarul Alam (Director)
- Number of employees: 5,000 (2021)
- Parent: Mostafa Hakim Family
- Website: mostafahakim.com

Mostafa–Hakim Group (Bengali: মোস্তফা-হাকিম গ্রুপ) is a Bangladeshi diversified conglomerate based in Chittagong. Abu Taher is the chairman and M. Manjur Alam, former mayor of Chittagong, is the managing director of the group.

== History ==
Mostafa–Hakim Group started as a construction company in the 1960s by Abdul Hakim. In 1984, the sons of Abdul Hakim expanded the business through diversification. Alhaj Hosne Ara Manjur Welfare Trust is a charity operated by the group.

Mostafa-Hakim real estate started in 2006. It has two rod factories in Sitakunda Upazila and Karnaphuli Upazila.

From 2010 to 2015, the managing director of Mostafa–Hakim Group, Mohammad Manjur Alam, served as the mayor of Chittagong. He is the executive director of the Mostafa Hakim Welfare Foundation and director of Standard Bank Limited. His nephew, Didarul Alam, is an Awami League member for parliament from Chittagong-4 and director of the Mostafa–Hakim Group.

During the COVID-19 pandemic in Bangladesh they supplied oxygen to hospitals for free. It launched Golden Ispat in March 2021 which was built with a 10 billion taka budget including a seven billion taka loan from United Commercial Bank. HM Steel and Industry Limited began operations on 6 March 2021 in Chittagong. In May 2022, Mostafa–Hakim Group launched HM Oxygen Limited with a capacity to produce 12 thousand cubic meters of oxygen per day.

=== Taher Group ===
The Construction unit of the Mostafa–Hakim Group is known as the Taher Group. It established the Mostafa Hakim Welfare Foundation which owns a number of educational institutions including Uttar Kattoli Alhaz Mostafa Hakim University College.

== Businesses ==
- Golden LPG Limited
- Golden Ispat Limited
- HM Steel and Industry Limited
- Mostafa-Hakim bricks
- Golden Iron Works Limited
- Taher & Co
- Golden Oxygen Limited
- HM Oxygen Limited
- M/S. Golden Bricks Works Limited
- Alhaj Mostafa-Hakim Cement Industries Limited
- Alhaj Mostafa-Hakim Trading Corporation
- Alhaj Mostafa Hakim Housing & Real Estate Limited
- Eagle Star Textile Mills Limited
- M/S. Golden Steel Alloy Works Limited
- T. R. Trading
- Ruslan Corporation
- Mostafa-Hakim Shipping Lines Limited
- Golden Auto Worksshop Limited
- T. R. Fishing Limited
- T. R. Shipbreaking Limited
