= Abdul Gafur Hali =

Bangladeshi folk lyricist, composer, and singer

- আব্দুল গফুর হালী
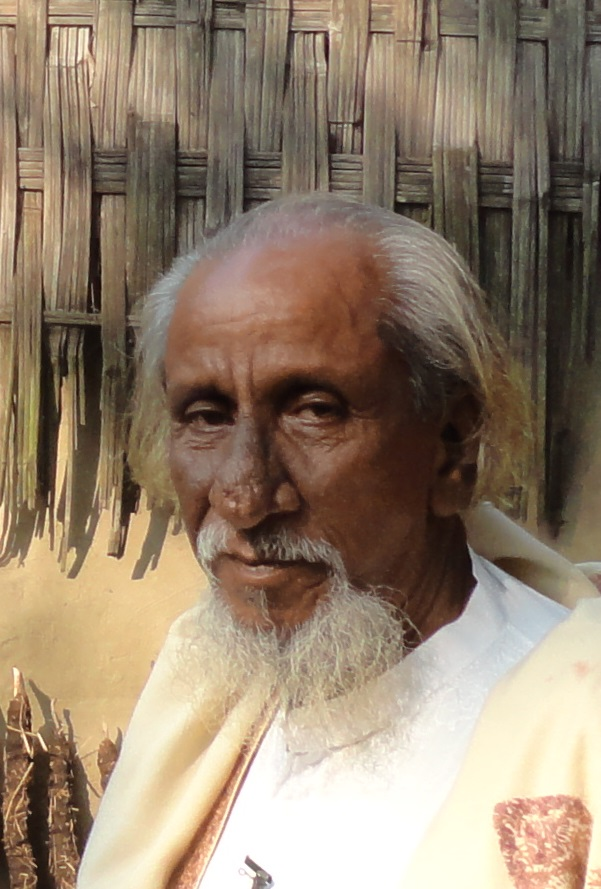
- Born: 6 August 1929; Potiya region, Chittagong District, Bengal Presidency, British India
- Died: 21 December 2016 (aged 87); Chittagong, Bangladesh
- Occupation: Singer
- Spouse: Rajia Begum

Abdul Gafur Hali (also known as Gafur Hali Maizbhanderi; 6 August 1929 – 21 December 2016) was a Bangladeshi folk lyricist, composer and singer of the Maizbhandari musical tradition. He was the first folk play author to use the Chittagonian language. His works are created mainly in his native language of Chittagong. He was also known by his Sufi name, Gafur Hali Maizbhanderi.

== Early life and education ==
Hali was born to Abdus Sobhan and Gultaj Khatun, in Rashidabad; in the Patiya region within the Chittagong district in 1929. He married Rajia Begum.

Hali studied primary school at Rashidabad and high school at Joara Bishwamvar. From an early age, he was inspired by the works of historically remarkable singer-songwriter Askar Ali Pandit, and latterly became influenced by the Maizbhanderi Sufi Singers, such as Moulana Bazlul Karim Kanchanpuri, Moulana Abdul Hadi, and Ramesh Shil. He never formally learned how to sing or play a harmonium, but used to follow their works.

== Career ==
At an early age, Hali achieved 1st position in the audition of Agrabad Radio Station. Since 1963, his songs have regularly been publicized on-air through radio as collected songs because he was not registered. After 7 years, he became a registered singer-lyricist-composer of East Pakistan Radio. It was Hali's profession that, into his eighties, he led his life as a professional lyricist, composer and singer. His lyrics and compositions can be categorized in socio-cultural and Sufi method, where socio-cultural songs are more than one thousand five hundred in number and of Sufi songs there are also over thousand. Though his family encouraged him to enter other professions, Hali was only interested in music. Once in 1955/56 while singing at Maizbhander Dorbar Sharif, Hali saw huge money over his harmonium, listeners have given out of love, which was his first income as an artist. That made him realize, even by singing a song, one can survive and since then he took it as his profession. His first Maizbhanderi Sufi lyric was: "Will you play How long!/ Will you die not?/ How many has come and gone/ Were they belongs to!". He was a regular lyricist and composer for Television and Radio Channels of Bangladesh.

=== Documentary ===
The documentary Methopother Gaan was developed representing his works and thought. Film maker Shaybal Chawdhury created this 39-minute-long documentary representing Hali as an ideal rural artist. Famous contemporary singers like Shyam Sundar Bhaishnav, Shefali Gosh, Kallyani Ghosh, Abdul Mannan Rana, Selim Nizami and many others re-performed his songs in that documentary.

=== Academy and Ode ===
Abdul Gafur Hali Academy was formed regarding Cultural and Social research. As well, a Lyrics and Musical notation collection of Maizbhanderi Sufi Songs; named Hali's Ode - The Tie of Melody (Bengali: সুরের বন্ধন/Surer Bandahn) including his 100 Maizbhanderi and Mystical Lyrics/ Songs and another one named, The Root (Bengali: শিকড়/Shikor) including his 100 rural Folk songs was published by Abdul Gafur Hali Academy and patronized by PHP Group.

== Famous works ==
Among more than 1,500; some of his most popular Sufi songs are:

- Dui Kul-er Sultan Vandari (Bengali: দুই কূলের সোলতান ভান্ডারী) (Vandari the Eternal the Savior)
- Dekhe jare Maizbhandere (Bengali: দেখে যারে মাইজভাণ্ডারে) (Pay your tribute to maizbhandar)
- Koto khela janore moula (Bengali: কতো খেলা জানরে মওলা) (Game of Mysticism)
- Maizbhandere ki dhoon ache (Bengali: মাইজভাণ্ডারে কি ধন আছে) (Gems of Maizbhandar)
- Cholo jai jiyarote mohsen awliar dorbare (Bengali: চল যাই জিয়ারতে মোহছেন আউলিয়ার দরবারে) (Let's visit the shrine of Mohsen Aulia)
- Allahr fokir more Jodi (Bengali: আল্লাহর ফকির মরে যদি) (When a Saint Dies!)

Meanwhile, over thousand, some popular socio-cultural songs are:

- Shona bondhu tui amare korli re dewana (Bengali: সোনাবন্ধু তুই আমারে করলি রে দিওয়ানা)
- Panjabiwala (Bengali: পাঞ্জাবিঅলা) (Man in Panjabi)
- Bondhu Aar Doardi Jao (Bengali: বন্ধু আঁর দুয়ারদি যঅ) (Oh My Friend, Visit Me often)
- Sotho kailla pirit ar (Bengali: ছোডকাইল্লা পীরিত আঁর) (We were just kids when we fall in love)
- Noo matai noobulai gelire bondhua (Bengali: ন মাতাই ন বোলাই গেলিরে বন্ধুয়া) (You just left with no hint back)
- Moner-o Bagane- Fotilo folree (Bengali: মনের বাগানে ফুটিল ফুলরে) (The flower bloomed)
- Tui jaiba shonadia bondhu, mach dhoribar lai (Bengali: তুঁই যাইবা সোনাদিয়া বন্ধু, মাছ মারিবার লাই)
- O sham Rengum noo jaio (Bengali: অ শ্যাম রেঙ্গুম ন যাইও)
- Dhol bajer r mic bajer (Bengali: ঢোল বাজের আর মাইক বাজের)
- Banu re! o banu! ai jaiumgui Chatga shohrot tuarlai ainnum ki (Bengali: বানুরে অ বানু আঁই যাইয়্যুম গই চাটগাঁ শঅরত তোঁয়ার লাই আইন্নুম কি?)

During the Liberation War of Bangladesh he sang songs to inspire the fighters, such as:
It is impossible to be familiar with you and me / You are Pathan and I am Bengali / Between your country and mine / There is a distance of 2000 miles.

== International acknowledgement ==
Professor Hans Harder of Heidelberg University, Germany visited different places in Bangladesh including Maizbhander of Chittagong in 1989 and the reason how, he met Abdul Gafur Hali through another popular singer Kolyani Ghosh. Latterly, Harder published a research work (treatise) named Ferkute Gafur; Spritht Gafur Means, Dippy gafur Says (Bengali: ডার ফেরুকটে গফুর, স্প্রিখট (পাগলা গফুর, বলে)) in 2004. It includes 76 songs of Hali. Hans Harder denoted the songs as, "Mystical songs of East Bengal (Bangladesh) composed by Abdul Gafur Hali". He narrated about Abdul Gafur Hali, "In spite of having any higher degree or designation of any University, Abdul Gafur Hali with his own effort was able to have an extraordinary knowledge".

As well, an album entitled, Foreign Beloved (Bengali: বন্ধু পরবাসী) produced by Indian Music director Koustob Sen Varat, was dedicated to Abdul Gafur Hali. Producer included Hali's five songs in that music album.

== Awards ==
He achieved a number of national and institutional awards. Some of those are:

- Rahe Bhander Ennoble Award (Bengali: রাহে ভান্ডার এ্যানোবেল এ্যাওয়ার্ড/ রাহে ভান্ডার সম্মাননা পদক) - 2012
- Chittagong Association Award/ Chittagong Summit Dhaka (Bengali: চট্টগ্রাম সমিতি পদক) - 2012
- Bangladesh Musical Organizations' Association Award (Bengali: বাংলাদেশ সংগীত সংগঠন সমন্বয় পরিষদ) - 2013
- Sukhendu Memorial Theater Award (Bengali: সুখেন্দু স্মৃতি নাট্যপদক) - 2013
- District Cultural Academy Award (Bengali: জেলা শিল্পকলা একাডেমি সম্মাননা) - 2013

== Death ==
Gafur died on 21 December 2016 at Mount Hospital in Chittagong.

== See also ==
- List of Sufi Saints of South Asia
