= Didarul Alam =

Bangladeshi politician

- দিদারুল আলম

Member of Parliament
- In office 29 January 2014 – 29 January 2024
- Preceded by: ABM Abul Kashem
- Succeeded by: SM Al Mamun
- Constituency: Chittagong-4

Personal details
- Born: 6 April 1968 (age 58) Chittagong, East Pakistan now Bangladesh
- Party: Bangladesh Awami League
- Relations: M. Manjur Alam (uncle)
- Relatives: Mostafa Hakim Family
- Education: BA
- Occupation: Businessman, politician

Didarul Alam (Bengali: দিদারুল আলম; born 6 April 1968) is a Bangladeshi businessman and politician who is a former member of parliament for Chittagong-4 and director of Mostafa-Hakim Group.

== Early life ==
Alam was born on 6 April 1968.

== Career ==
Alam was elected to parliament on 5 January 2014 for Chittagong-4 as a Bangladesh Awami League candidate. His supporter and Jubo League leader, Ramzan Ali, was assassinated in August 2018 in Chittagong. Ramzan was accused in a number of criminal cases.
