= Chittagong-3 =

Constituency of Bangladesh's Jatiya Sangsad

Coordinates: 22.49°N 91.46°E

- Constituency for the Jatiya Sangsad
- District: Chittagong District
- Division: Chittagong Division
- Electorate: 260,485 (2026)

Current constituency
- Created: 1973
- Party: Bangladesh Nationalist Party
- Member: Mostafa Kamal Pasha
- ← 279 Chittagong-2 281 Chittagong-4 →

Chittagong-3 is a constituency represented in the Jatiya Sangsad (National Parliament) of Bangladesh since 2026 by Mostafa Kamal Pasha of the Bangladesh Nationalist Party.

== Boundaries ==
The constituency encompasses Sandwip Upazila.

== History ==
The constituency was created for the first general elections in newly independent Bangladesh, held in 1973.

According to BNA News 24, the constituency encompassed Sandwip Upazila at least as far back as the 1991 general election.

Ahead of the 2008 general election, the Election Commission redrew constituency boundaries to reflect population changes revealed by the 2001 Bangladesh census. The 2008 redistricting added a 16th seat to Chittagong District. The new Chittagong-16 constituency covered Sandwip Upazila. Chittagong-3 was changed to encompass Sitakunda Upazila and Chittagong City Corporation wards 9 and 10.

Ahead of the 2014 general election, the Election Commission renumbered the seat for Sandwip Upazila from Chittagong-16 to Chittagong-3, bumping up by one the suffix of the former constituency of that name and the higher-numbered constituencies in the district. Subsequent news reports occasionally misidentified Chittagong-3 as Sitakunda, even as late as the 2018 election, but most sources quickly adjusted to the return to Sandwip Upazila.

== Members of Parliament ==
| Election | Member | Party |
|---|---|---|
| 1973 | M. Obaidul Huq | Awami League |
| 1979 | AKM Rafiq Ullah Choudhury | Gano Front |
| 1986 | AKM Shamsul Huda | Jatiya Party |
| 1991 | Mustafizur Rahman | Awami League |
| Feb 1996 | Mostafa Kamal Pasha | Bangladesh Nationalist Party |
| Jun 1996 | Mustafizur Rahman | Awami League |
| 2001 | Mostafa Kamal Pasha | Bangladesh Nationalist Party |
Major Boundary Changes
| 2008 | ABM Abul Kashem | Awami League |
Major Boundary Changes
| 2014 | Mahfuzur Rahaman | Awami League |
| 2018 | Mahfuzur Rahaman | Awami League |
| 2024 | Mahfuzur Rahaman | Awami League |
| 2026 | Mostafa Kamal Pasha | Bangladesh Nationalist Party |

== Elections ==
=== Elections in the 2020s ===
General Election 2026: Chittagong-3
| Party | Candidate | Votes | % | ±% |
|---|---|---|---|---|
| BNP | Mostafa Kamal Pasha | 73,037 | 61.8 | N/A |
| Jamaat | Mohammad Alauddin Sikder | 39,662 | 33.6 | N/A |
| IAB | Muhammad Amzad Hossain | 5,145 | 4.4 | N/A |
| Independent | Md. Moahedul | 308 | 0.3 | N/A |
| Majority | | 33,375 | 28.2 | N/A |
| Turnout | | 118,152 | 45.3 | N/A |
| BNP gain from AL | | | | |

=== Elections in the 2010s ===
General Election 2018: Chittagong-3
| Party | Candidate | Votes | % | ±% |
|---|---|---|---|---|
| AL | Mahfuzur Rahaman | 162,356 | 96.90 | +0.6 |
| BNP | Mostafa Kamal Pasha | 3,122 | 1.90 | −51.5 |
| IAB | Monsurul Haque | 2,076 | 1.20 | N/A |
| Majority | | 159,234 | 95.00 | +1.7 |
| Turnout | | 167,554 | 82.70 | +6.4 |
| Registered electors | | 202,635 | | |
| AL hold | | | | |

General Election 2014: Chittagong-3
| Party | Candidate | Votes | % | ±% |
|---|---|---|---|---|
| AL | Mahfuzur Rahaman | 111,743 | 96.3 | +41.9 |
| JP(E) | M. A. Salam | 3,466 | 3.0 | N/A |
| JSD | Nurul Akhtar | 874 | 0.8 | N/A |
| Majority | | 108,277 | 93.3 | +83.9 |
| Turnout | | 116,083 | 65.6 | −15.5 |
| AL gain from BNP | | | | |

=== Elections in the 2000s ===
General Election 2008: Chittagong-3
| Party | Candidate | Votes | % | ±% |
|---|---|---|---|---|
| AL | ABM Abul Kashem | 136,298 | 54.4 | +18.5 |
| BNP | Aslam Chowdhury | 112,930 | 45.0 | −18.8 |
| CPB | Md. Macheuddulla | 850 | 0.3 | N/A |
| National People's Party | Kazi Mohammal Eusuf Alam | 435 | 0.2 | N/A |
| Independent | Sachindra Lal Dey | 213 | 0.1 | N/A |
| Majority | | 23,368 | 9.3 | −18.6 |
| Turnout | | 250,726 | 81.8 | +14.0 |
| AL gain from BNP | | | | |

General Election 2001: Chittagong-3
| Party | Candidate | Votes | % | ±% |
|---|---|---|---|---|
| BNP | Mostafa Kamal Pasha | 69,546 | 63.8 | +21.7 |
| AL | Mustafizur Rahman | 39,135 | 35.9 | −15.5 |
| IJOF | M. A. Salam | 264 | 0.2 | N/A |
| Independent | Mohammad Nazrul Islam | 97 | 0.1 | N/A |
| Independent | Jamal Uddin Chowdhury | 46 | 0.0 | N/A |
| Majority | | 30,411 | 27.9 | +18.7 |
| Turnout | | 109,088 | 67.8 | +2.5 |
| BNP hold | | | | |

=== Elections in the 1990s ===
General Election June 1996: Chittagong-3
| Party | Candidate | Votes | % | ±% |
|---|---|---|---|---|
| AL | Mustafizur Rahman | 40,911 | 51.4 | −13.4 |
| BNP | Mostafa Kamal Pasha | 33,557 | 42.1 | +15.5 |
| Jamaat | Md. Nurul Huda | 4,600 | 5.8 | −1.2 |
| JP(E) | Md. Rafiqul Moula | 264 | 0.3 | −0.7 |
| Independent | Manirul Huda Baban | 123 | 0.2 | N/A |
| Zaker Party | Jasimuddin Ahmmed Chowdhury | 103 | 0.1 | N/A |
| Gano Forum | Md. Mainuddin Mahmud | 95 | 0.1 | N/A |
| Majority | | 7,354 | 9.2 | −29.0 |
| Turnout | | 79,653 | 65.3 | +14.1 |
| AL gain from BNP | | | | |

General Election 1991: Chittagong-3
| Party | Candidate | Votes | % | ±% |
|---|---|---|---|---|
| AL | Mustafizur Rahman | 55,523 | 64.8 | |
| BNP | A K M Rafiq Ullah Chowdhury | 22,805 | 26.6 | |
| Jamaat | Md. Nurul Huda | 5,981 | 7.0 | |
| JP(E) | M. A. Salam | 835 | 1.0 | |
| CPB | Shafiqul Mawla | 332 | 0.4 | |
| JSD | Abul Kashem | 171 | 0.2 | |
| Majority | | 32,718 | 38.2 | |
| Turnout | | 85,647 | 51.2 | |
| AL hold | | | | |
