= Uttar Kattoli Alhaz Mostafa Hakim University College =

College in City Gate area, Chittagong, Bangladesh

Uttar Kattali Al-Haj Mustafa Hakim College
- উত্তর কাট্টলী আলহাজ্ব মোস্তফা-হাকিম কলেজ
- Motto: জ্ঞানই শক্তি
- Motto in English: Knowledge Is Power
- Type: Private
- Established: 1994; 32 years ago
- Founders: Mostafa–Hakim Group
- Affiliations: Bangladesh National University; Board of Intermediate and Secondary Education, Chattogram
- Chairman: A. S. M. Amanullah
- Principal: Prof. Mohammad Alamgir
- Vice-Principal: Prof. Mahfuzul Hoque Chowdhury
- Location: City Gate, Chittagong, Bangladesh; 22.3734°N 91.7710°E
- Campus: Urban, 1 acre (0.40 ha)
- Language: Bengali and English
- Website: ukamhdc.edu.bd

Uttar Kattali Al-Haj Mustafa Hakim College, Chattogram EIIN: 104688 is a college which is situated at City Gate area, Chittagong. It was established in 1994. The college is run by the "Mostafa Hakim Welfare Foundation". The Foundation was established by Taher Group.

== Department ==
- HSC courses:
1. Science
2. Commerce
3. Arts
- Degree (pass) courses:
1. Department Of B. A. (pass)
2. Department Of B. S. S. (pass)
3. Department Of B. B. S. (pass)
- Honours courses:
1. Department Of Philosophy
2. Department Of Economics
3. Department Of Accounting
4. Department Of Management
- Master's final courses:
1. Department Of Accounting
2. Department Of Management

== Environment of the college and education ==
There are science group, commerce group and arts group in this college for HSC level. On the other hand, there is degree level for higher studies. Recently, the college started Honours section. For this reason, construction of a building for honours is going on. The cost is 70 lakh taka and it is taken from college fund.
