= Mustafizur Rahman (Chittagong politician) =

Bangladeshi politician (1943–2001)

Dwip Bandhu Mustafizur Rahman
- মুস্তাফিজুর রহমান

Member of Parliament
- In office 5 March 1991 – 24 November 1995
- Preceded by: AKM Shamsul Huda
- Succeeded by: Mostafa Kamal Pasha
- Constituency: Chittagong-3
- In office 14 July 1996 – 13 July 2001
- Preceded by: Mostafa Kamal Pasha
- Succeeded by: Mostafa Kamal Pasha
- Constituency: Chittagong-3

Personal details
- Born: 31 December 1943 Sandwip, Bengal Presidency, British India
- Died: 20 October 2001 (aged 57) Mount Elizabeth Hospital, Singapore
- Party: Bangladesh Awami League
- Spouse: Mohsena Ara Begum
- Children: Mahfuzur Rahaman

Mustafizur Rahman (31 December 1943 – 20 October 2001) was a member of the Jatiya Sangsad for the Chittagong-3 constituency from 1991 to 1996, representing the Bangladesh Awami League.

He was the editor and publisher of the Daily Rupali. He also founded several life insurance companies, including: Karnaphuli Life Insurance Company Ltd, National Life Insurance Limited, Rupali Life Insurance Company Ltd, and Sandhani Life Insurance Ltd.

Rahman died on 20 October 2001 at Mount Elizabeth Hospital in Singapore.

== Legacy ==
The 700-meter concrete Dwipbandhu Mustafizur Rahman Jetty at Guptachhara on the east coast of Sandwip is named in his honor. It was completed in January 2021 at a cost of Bangladeshi taka 510 million ($6M as of 2021).
