= AKM Rafiq Ullah Choudhury =

Bangladeshi politician

AKM Rafiq Ullah Chowdhury

Member of Bangladesh Parliament
- In office 1979–1986
- Preceded by: M. Obaidul Huq
- Succeeded by: AKM Shamsul Huda

Personal details
- Born: October 1923 Chittagong District
- Died: 22 September 2011 (aged 87) Chittagong
- Party: Jatiya Gano Front

AKM Rafiq Ullah Chowdhury was a Jatiya Gano Front politician and member of parliament for Chittagong-3.

== Career ==
Chowdhury was elected to parliament from Chittagong-3 as a Jatiya Gano Front candidate in 1979.
