= Mostafa Kamal Pasha =

Bangladeshi politician

- মোস্তফা কামাল পাশা

Member of the Bangladesh Parliament for Chittagong-3
- Incumbent
- Assumed office 17 February 2026
- Preceded by: Mahfuzur Rahaman
- In office 28 October 2001 – 28 January 2014
- Preceded by: Mustafizur Rahman
- Succeeded by: Mahfuzur Rahaman
- In office February 1996 – June 1996
- Preceded by: Mustafizur Rahman
- Succeeded by: Mustafizur Rahman

Personal details
- Born: 14 August 1950 (age 76) Sandwip Upazila, Chittagong, East Bengal
- Party: Bangladesh Nationalist Party
- Occupation: Businessman, politician

Mostafa Kamal Pasha (Bengali: মোস্তফা কামাল পাশা), also known as Pasha, is a Bangladesh Nationalist Party politician and a member of parliament for Chittagong-3. He was elected in the June 1996, 2001, 2008, and 2026 general elections. Before becoming an MP, he served as the chairman of Sandwip Upazila.

== Career ==
Pasha was elected to the Bangladesh Parliament from Chittagong-3 as a Bangladesh Nationalist Party (BNP) candidate in the June 1996, 2001, and 2008 general elections. He also served as the chairman of Sandwip Upazila, where he played a significant role in local BNP leadership, and he is currently a member of the BNP national executive committee.

On 24 November 2013, Pasha's son was shot, and his house was set on fire during clashes between activists of the Bangladesh Awami League and the Bangladesh Nationalist Party.
