= Salina Begum =

Bangladeshi politician

- সেলিনা বেগম

Member of the Bangladesh Parliament for Reserved Women's Seat-6
- In office 23 March 2014 – 30 December 2018
- Succeeded by: Khadizatul Anwar

Personal details
- Party: Bangladesh Awami League

Salina Begum is a Bangladesh Awami League politician and the former member of the Bangladesh Parliament from a reserved seat.

== Early life ==
Begum was born on 1 June 1968. She has no formal education.

== Career ==
Begum was elected to parliament from a reserved seat as a Bangladesh Awami League candidate in 2014.
