= Gulamur Rahman =

Bengali scholar and Sufi saint (1865–1937)

Syed Gulamur Rahman Maizbhandari

Personal life
- Born: Syed Gulamur Rahman; 1865 Maizbhandar, Bengal Presidency, British India
- Died: 1937 (aged 71–72) Maizbhandar, Bengal Presidency, British India
- Resting place: Shrine of Syed Gulamur Rahman Maizbhandari, Maizbhandar, Bangladesh
- Known for: 2nd leader of the Maizbhandari Sufi Order
- Relatives: Syed Najibul Bashar Maizbhandari (grandson); Syed Ahmad Ullah (uncle); Ziaul Haq (grandson)

Religious life
- Religion: Islam
- Denomination: Sunni
- Jurisprudence: Hanafi
- Tariqa: Maizbhandari
- Arabic name
- Personal (Ism): Ghulām ar-Raḥmān غلام الرحمن
- Patronymic (Nasab): ibn ʿAbd al-Karīm ibn Muṭīʿ Ullāh ibn Ṭayyab Ullāh ibn ʿAbd al-Qādir ibn Ḥamīd ad-Dīn بن عبد الكريم بن مطيع الله بن طيب الله بن عبد القادر بن حميد الدين
- Epithet (Laqab): Bābā Bhandārī بابا بهنداري
- Toponymic (Nisba): al-Māʾijbhandārī المائجبهنداري as-Sayyid السيد

Gulamur Rahman Maizbhandari (Bengali: গোলামুর রহমান মাইজভাণ্ডারী; 1865–1937), also known by his sobriquet Baba Bhandari (Bengali: বাবা ভাণ্ডারী), was a Bengali Sufi preacher who succeeded his uncle, Syed Ahmad Ullah, as the head of the Maizbhandari Sufi Order, the first such Sufi order in Bengal.

== Background and ancestry ==
Gulamur Rahman's father was Abdul Karim Shah, younger brother of Syed Ahmad Ullah, and his mother was Musharaf Jaan. His paternal ancestors were Syeds and originally migrated from Madinah to Gaur, the former capital of medieval Bengal, via Baghdad and Delhi. His ancestor, Hamid ad-Din, was the appointed Imam and Qadi of Gaur, but due to a sudden epidemic in the city, Hamid later migrated to Patiya in Chittagong District. Hamid's son, Syed Abdul Qadir, was made the imam of Azimnagar in modern-day Fatikchhari. He had two sons; Syed Ataullah and Syed Tayyab Ullah. The latter had three sons; Syed Ahmad, Syed Matiullah and Syed Abdul Karim, and the youngest son was the father of Gulamur Rahman.

== Early life and education ==
Rahman was born into a Bengali Muslim family in the village of Maizbhandar in Fatikchhari, Chittagong on 14 October 1865. His uncle, who called him "the rose of my garden", entrusted him with the teaching of students, particularly adepts. He spent time wandering alone in the woods as part of his spiritual studies. Around 1914, he entered a state of meditation and stopped speaking except on rare occasions, thus becoming known as a magdub pir. In 1928, he moved out of his father's house into his own, where disciples and his four sons took over responsibility for the order's administration.

== Succession from Syed Ahmad Ullah ==
According to German scholar Hans Harder, there is disagreement over the type of spiritual mandate Gholam Rahman received from Syed Ahmad Ullah and his status as a saint. Writers from Rahmaniyya Manzil, the house of the descendants of Gholam Rahman, class him as a ġawṯ al-aʿẓam, the highest category of walī Allāh, alongside Ahmadullah, and sometimes claim that he was installed by Ahmadullah as his spiritual successor (sağğādanašīn). The descendants of Syed Ahmad Ullah, however, insist that he was Ahmadullah's main delegate (pradhān khaliphā), and object to him receiving the title of ġawṯ al-aʿẓam, though it does appear in one of Delawar Hosain's writings.

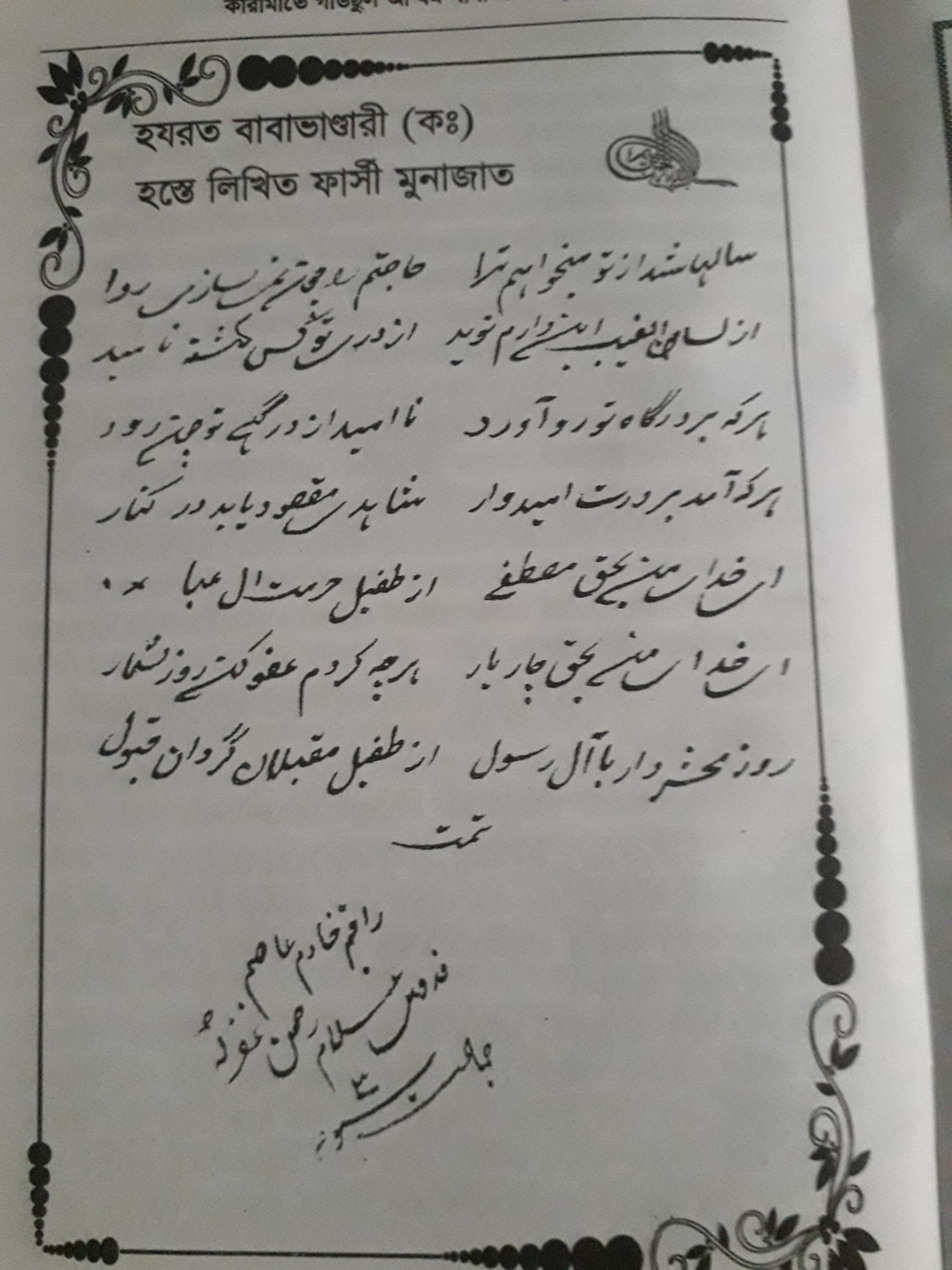
Hand Writing of Baba Bhandari

== See also ==
- List of Sufi Saints of South Asia
- Abdul-Qadir Gilani
