= Ainul Kamal =

Bangladeshi politician

Member of Bangladesh Parliament
- Preceded by: L. K. Siddiqi
- Succeeded by: L. K. Siddiqi

Personal details
- Party: Jatiya Party

Ainul Kamal is a Jatiya Party politician and a former member of parliament for Chittagong-2.

== Career ==
Kamal was elected to parliament from Chittagong-2 as a Jatiya Party candidate in 1986 and 1988.
