= Sayed Ziaul Haq =

Bengali scholar and Sufi saint (1928–1988)

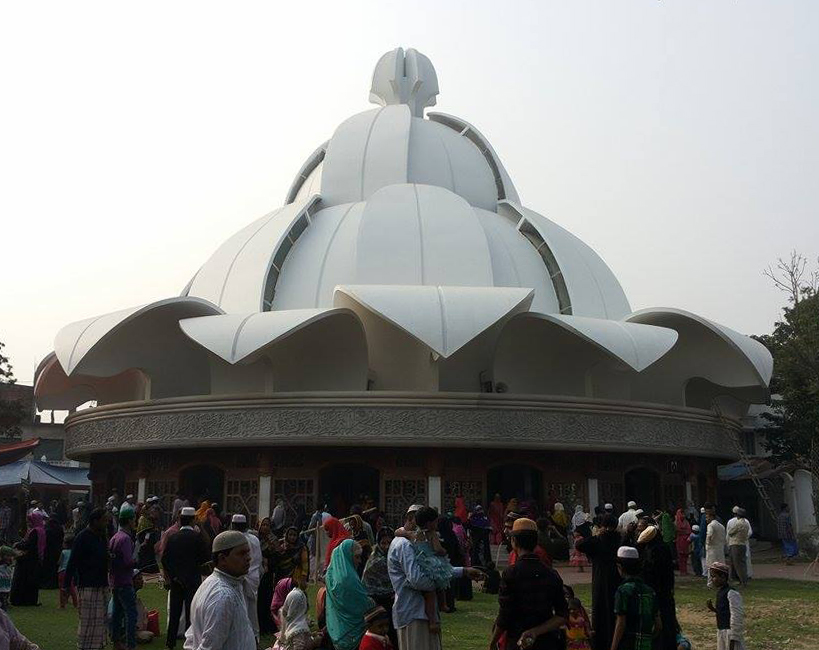
Shrine of Sayed Ziaul Haq

Sayed Ziaul Haq (Bengali: সৈয়দ জিয়াউল হক; 1928–1988) was a Sufi saint of the Maizbhanderi Sufi order, also known as Bisso Wali (Bengali: বিশ্ব অলী), Shahenshah (Bengali: শাহেনশাহ), Zia Baba (Bengali: জিয়া বাবা) and Shahenshah Sayed Ziaul Haq Maizbhanderi Kaddasa Sirhul Ajiz (Bengali: শাহেনশাহ হযরত সৈয়দ জিয়াউল হক মাইজভান্ডারী কাদ্দাছা ছিরহুল আজিজ).

== Born ==
His mother, Sayeda Sajeda Khatun, was the second daughter of Baba Bhanderi. He was born at Maizbhandar in Chittagong district, British India (now Bangladesh) on Tuesday morning, 25 December 1928; Poush 10, 1335 BC; Rajab 12, 1347 AH. Initially, he was named as Sayed Badiur Rahman on the 7th day of his birth; later, his father, Sayed Delaor Husaein, renamed him Sayed Ziaul Haq following a dream.

== Education ==
House tutor Moulavi Mozammel Haq taught him the Arabic alphabetic at elementary level. Then had been learning up-to class three at Maizbhandar Ahmadia Junior Madrasa. He was admitted at class five and studied up to eight at Nanupur Abu Sobhan High School. Later, he studied class nine through ten and passed the Entrance Examination from Chittagong Collegiate School in 1949. After accomplishing intermediate Level (I.A.) from Chittagong College, while as a student of Kanongopara Sir Ashotos Government Degree College of Boalkhali, Haq experienced altered consciousness during his 3rd examination of bachelor's degree (B.A.), coming of the examination hall with a blank answer script. After this, he did not pursue further formal education.

== Sufi perspective ==
After undergoing what he regarded as a spiritual experience during academic examinations, Haq returned to Maizbhander at Fatikchari from Boalkhali. After his return, Haq adopted a Sufi monastic lifestyle. During Sufi meditation (Reajat/Muraqaba/Moshaheda), he sometimes used to refuse food and remain consistently sleepless for several days, very often he used to dive in severe cold pound water even in intensive winter season for a couple of days. Meanwhile, he also used to stay alone in a closed door room being detached from all mundane intercourse for days long.

There has noted in various published hagiography, while his father was upset regarding son's abnormal attitude, get a Sainthood inspiration in dream by Sayed Ahmed Ullah Maizbhanderi saying, "Why are you so anxious? Let you ware him my green long Cloak (jubba)". The father immediately put the dress wearing on his son, since then, Sayed Ziaul Haq's attitude get a remarkable change remaining calm and quiet. Hagiographers noted him as a Majjub-e-Salek (Bengali: মজ্জুবে ছালেক দরবেশ/ Arabic: الصّوفي المجذوب السالك), used to travel over days across hills, forest, seaside and different places sleeplessly without any pre-arrangement. He is memorable for a huge number of mysterious/Karamath events. He succeeded the spiritual chain/Shajrah of his Sufi master as well as father, that goes to Sayed Ahmed Ullah Maizbhanderi through Sayed Aminul Haq Wasel (Choto Moulana).

== Sobriquet ==
Haq is known by millions, often through multiple sobriquets, two of which are the most famous. "Bishaw Wali," (Bengali: বিশ্ব অলী) which can be translated as "the Universal Sufi Saint" or "Global Sufi," is his most used title. Another sobriquet is "Shahenshah Babajan" (Bengali: শাহেনশাহ বাবাজান) since early on in his monastic life.

== Family ==
On January 28, 1955, he married Sayeda Monwara Begum, the youngest daughter of Late Badaruzzaman Chowdhury (Badan Sikder). On January 16, 1982, his father died, was a Sufi saint and a remarkable author. According to the genealogical lineage he is a descendant of the Islamic prophet Mohammed through Sayed Abdul Qader Gilani and Fatimah Zahra.

== Legacy ==
He left five daughters and one son. His only son Sayed Muhammad Hasan also known as 'Mawla Hujur', 'Hasan Mawla'. After accomplishing his M.A. in English, Mawla Hujur is acting as the Sajjadanashin of his Sufi rituals as well as the President of Maizbhandari Academy and Trusty of Shahanshah Hadrath Sayed Ziaul Haq Maizbhandari Trust, established to spread and publicized Sayed Ziaul Haq's teachings and thought among the society. The trust is operating a number of schools, orphanages, cultural and social welfare institutes. He is the organizer of annual International Sufi Conference, Bangladesh.

== Death ==
He died on October 12, 1988, at the age of 60.

== Shrine ==
Nowadays, one of the latest designed tomb/ majar by architect Alamgir Kabir has the look of a lily, constructed from 1993 to 1997, has the status of a modern monument. Every year, many devotees from different countries visit the majar on his ORS Mobarak.

== See also ==
- List of Sufi Saints of South Asia
- Abdul-Qadir Gilani
- Golamur Rahman Maizbhandari (Baba Bhandari)
- Ghous-e-Azam
- Ibn Arabi
- Dervish
- Fakir
