= Mahfuzur Rahaman =

Bangladeshi politician

Mahfuzur Rahaman Mita
- মাহফুজুর রহমান মিতা
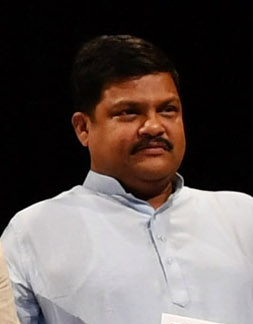

Member of Parliament
- In office 29 January 2014 – 6 August 2024
- Preceded by: Mostafa Kamal Pasha
- Succeeded by: Mostafa Kamal Pasha
- Constituency: Chittagong-3

Personal details
- Born: June 1, 1970 (age 55) Snadwip, Chittagong, East Pakistan now Bangladesh
- Party: Bangladesh Awami League
- Parents: Mustafizur Rahman (father); Mohsena Ara Begum (mother)

Mahfuzur Rahaman Mita (Bengali: মাহফুজুর রহমান মিতা; born 1 June 1970) is a businessman and a politician of Bangladesh Awami League and a former member of Jatiya Sangsad representing the Chittagong-3 constituency.

== Early life ==
Mahfuzur Rahaman was born on 1 June 1970 to a Bengali Muslim family in the village of Kuciyamora (Bauriya Union) in the island of Sandwip, off the coast of Chittagong, East Pakistan. He is the eldest son of Dwipabandhu Alhajj Mustafizur Rahman and Mohsena Ara Begum. He has a master's degree in communication. He is the chairperson of Rupali Life Insurance and the director of Sonar Bangla.

== Career ==
Mita is a former member of Jatiya Sangsad elected from Chittagong-3 in the 2014, 2018 and 2024 national parliament elections and a member of the parliamentary standing committee on the Ministry of Shipping in the Eleventh National parliament.
