= Maizbhandari =

Bangladeshi Sufi order of Sunni Islam

Maizbhandari order Tariqah-e-Maizbhandaria
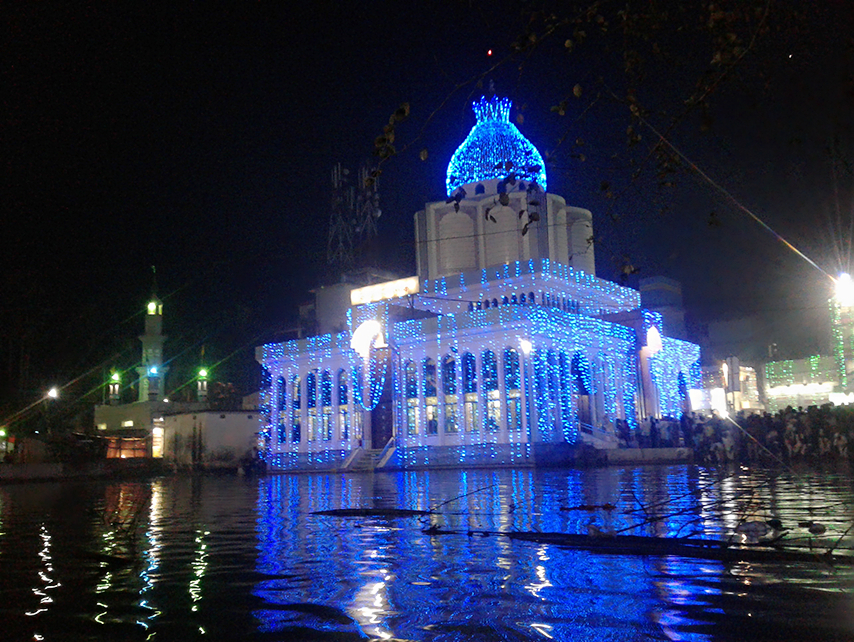
- Shrine of Ahmad Ullah Maizbhandari, the founder of the Maizbhandari Sufi order
- Abbreviation: Maizbhandari
- Formation: 19th century
- Type: Sufi order
- Headquarters: Chittagong, Bangladesh
- Key people: Ahmad Ullah Maizbhandari

The Maizbhandari (Bengali: মাইজভাণ্ডারী), or sometimes Maijbhandari (Arabic: المائجبهندارية, romanized: al-māʾijbahandāryyah), order or tariqa of Sufism within Sunni Islam was founded in the late 19th century by the Bengali Sufi saint Ahmad Ullah Maizbhandari from Chittagong. It is the only Sufi order to have originated from within the Bengal region, and, as an indigenous movement, it has continued to enjoy significant popularity through to the 21st century.

== Origins ==
The Maizbhandari order bases its tradition and draws its legitimacy from a saying of the tenth-century Sufi scholar Ibn Arabi, who predicted that a great spiritual leader would be "born in China", and that he would speak the language of the country. Maizbhandari Sufis interpret Ibn Arabi's prophecy to mean Chittagong, where the expansion of Islam had ended and where the Indian subcontinent butted up against "China" in the sense of the Chinese, or ancient Mongol, sphere of influence. Ahmad Ullah Maizbhandari was born in Chittagong in 1828, which, according to Maizbhandari Sufis, was as foretold six hundred years earlier by Ibn Arabi.

Since its 19th-century origins, the Maizbhandari movement has developed into "a powerful religious institution whose very popularity and influence defy any notions of marginality. It has been able to draw adherents from all sections of society, including the urban middle class", and been able to assert its reformist perspective on Islam, "while keeping in touch with the religious mainstream in Bengal", according to scholar Hans Harder.

== Literary tradition ==
The Maizbhandari order has been responsible for "a sizeable textual output ...since the beginning of the twentieth century, including hagiographies and theological treaties, in the form of monographs, leaflets and journals".

Maizbhandari theological and hagiological writings have taken on various forms, including long treatises, fatwas or short articles (prabandha), and have been noted as a distinctly local tradition, with the "larger part" of the writings being independent works by writers hailing from either Chittagong or other areas of Eastern Bengal.

One seminal work in the tradition is Aminul Haq Farhadabadi's (1866–1944) Tuḥfat al-aḫyār fī dafʿ šarārat al-šarār ("The precious gift of the good regarding the refutation of the evilness of the evil", 1906/7), which is a fatwa or legal opinion on the legitimacy of samāʿ and activities such as listening to music. Originally a mix of Arabic and Persian, the text was later circulated as a manuscript (pũthi) with a Bengali translation.

Another key work is Abdul Ghani Kanchanpuri's Āʾīna-i Bārī ('Mirror of the Lord'), an Urdu work written and published in 1915 as both a hagiographical account of Ahmad Ullah's life and a collection of more than 100 Urdu ghazals, a form of poem or ode. As an exposition of the Maizbhandari movement's theological foundations, it remains "the most comprehensive outline of Maijbhandari theology available to this day".

A more concise account of Maizbhandari theology is Abdussalam Isapuri's Fuyūẓāt al-Raḥmāniyya fī ṭarīqat al-māʾiğbhand˙āriyya, a Persian language work.

Taken as a whole, the tradition has various literary sources, including medieval Islamic literature from Bengal, medieval Persian literature by Sufis in the courts of the former capitals Gaur, Pandua and Dhaka, and the literature of "pan-Sufic" authors such as Ibn Arabi (d. 1240), Jalal al-Din Rumi (d. 1273), Farid al-Din Attar (d. 1220), Mu'in al-Din Chishti (d. 1236) and the founder of the Qadiriyya ṭarīqa, Abd al-Qadir Gilani (d. 1166).

Maizbhandari thought has also gone on to influence other fields, with the movement's ethical precepts being re-interpreted in Bangladesh for applications in subject areas such as business management, where spiritual conceptions of self-purification have been translated into ethical models for building and sustaining trust with customers.

== Urs gatherings ==
The Maizbhandari order is also known for its urs, an annual religious gathering purported to be at least the fifth largest congregation of Muslims in the world. The event begins each year on the tenth day of the Bengali month of Magh, and sees five to six hundred thousand people gather for several days of festivities centred around the performance of devotional music singing the praises of the Maizbhandari saints. The gatherings are attended by both Muslims and Hindus and some of the most famous Maizbhandari performers are Hindus.

=== Musical tradition ===
Partly born out of the popular and ecumenical nature of the Urs gatherings, the order's form of spiritual listening and devotional music has become well-known and widespread, and the Maizbhandari tradition of spiritual songs has come to represent one of the largest corpuses of popular songs in Bengal.

One early 20th-century Maizhbandari tradition musician, Ramesh Shil, composed about 350 Maizbhandari songs praising the order and Ahmad Ullah Maizbhandari. These songs had been published in nine volumes titled Ashekmala, Shantibhandar, Muktir Darbar, Nure Duniya, Jibansathi, Satyadarpan, Bhandare Maula, Manab Bandhu and Eshke Sirajia. Abdul Gafur Hali, who died in 2016, was a late 20th-century musician of the genre who similarly wrote hundreds of songs and was known for his "extraordinary knowledge" of the tradition.

Today, there is a catalogue over 10,000 Maizbhandari songs, many transmitted orally originally but now available on CD and video, making up a distinct genre of music in Bangladesh.

== Offshoots ==
=== Rahe Bhander Order ===
Rahe Bhandar order is a branch of the Maizbhandari Sufi order, established under the leadership of Syed Salekur Rahman Shah in the village of south Rajangar in the Rangunia Upazila. Like other branches of the Maizbhandari order, the Rahe Bhandar order is deeply engaged with music. Although the order was founded in Rajangar, significant contributions to its musical outreach and propagation have been made by Syed Mohammad Abdul Malek Shah from the village of Kadhurkhil in the Boalkhali Upazila of Chittagong. He established the Rahe Bhandar Kadhurkhil Darbar Sharif, now known as Chattogram Darbar Sharif, which played a crucial role in spreading this Sufi order. Before this establishment, the site was known as the khanqah of Syed Salekur Rahman Shah.

Syed Jafar Sadek Shah has also been instrumental in the propagation of the Rahe Bhandar order, continuing his efforts to this day. His contributions in music composition and humanitarian perspectives have greatly supported the spread of this order.

== See also ==
- List of Sufi orders
- Gulamur Rahman
- Ziaul Haq
- Najibul Bashar
