= L. K. Siddiqi =

Bangladeshi politician

7th Deputy Speaker of the Jatiya Sangsad
- In office 19 March 1996 – 14 July 1996
- Speaker: Sheikh Razzak Ali
- Preceded by: Humayun Khan Panni
- Succeeded by: Mohammad Abdul Hamid

Minister of Water Resources
- In office 10 October 2001 – 22 May 2003
- Prime Minister: Khaleda Zia
- Preceded by: Abdur Razzak
- Succeeded by: Ramesh Chandra Sen

Member of Jatiya Sangsad
- In office 10 October 2001 – 28 October 2006
- Preceded by: ABM Abul Kashem
- Succeeded by: Salahuddin Quader Chowdhury
- Constituency: Chittagong-2
- In office 20 March 1991 – 30 March 1996
- Preceded by: Ainul Kamal
- Succeeded by: ABM Abul Kashem
- In office 1979–1986
- Preceded by: Mustafizur Rahman Siddiqi
- Succeeded by: Ainul Kamal

Personal details
- Born: 15 April 1939 South Rahmatnagar, Muradpur, Sitakunda Upazila, Chittagong
- Died: 1 August 2014 (aged 75) Mount Elizabeth Hospital, Singapore
- Party: Bangladesh Nationalist Party
- Spouse: Mahmuda Siddiqui
- Children: 4

Lutful Kabir Siddiqi (15 April 1939 – 1 August 2014), was a politician and philanthropist from Bangladesh and member of parliament.

== Biography ==
Siddiqi was born on 15 April 1939 in South Rahmatnagar under Muradpur Union of Sitakunda Thana of Chittagong Division. His father was Abul Monsur Lutf e Ahmed Siddiqui.

He was elected member of parliament four times from his constituency Sitakundo, Chittagong. He was the state minister for power in 1978–1981. From 2001 to 2003, he was the water resources minister. He served as the deputy speaker of the Bangladesh Parliament. He was involved with Bangladesh Nationalist Party since inception and till his departure.

Siddiqi died on 1 August 2014.
