= M. Obaidul Huq =

Bangladeshi politician

Member of Bangladesh Parliament
- In office 1973–1979
- Succeeded by: AKM Rafiq Ullah Choudhury

Personal details
- Political party: Bangladesh Awami League

M. Obaidul Huq is a Bangladesh Awami League politician and a former member of parliament for Chittagong-3.

== Career ==
Obaidul Huq was elected to parliament from Chittagong-3 as a Bangladesh Awami League candidate in 1973.
