= Runu Reza =

Bangladesh Awami League politician

- রুনু রেজা
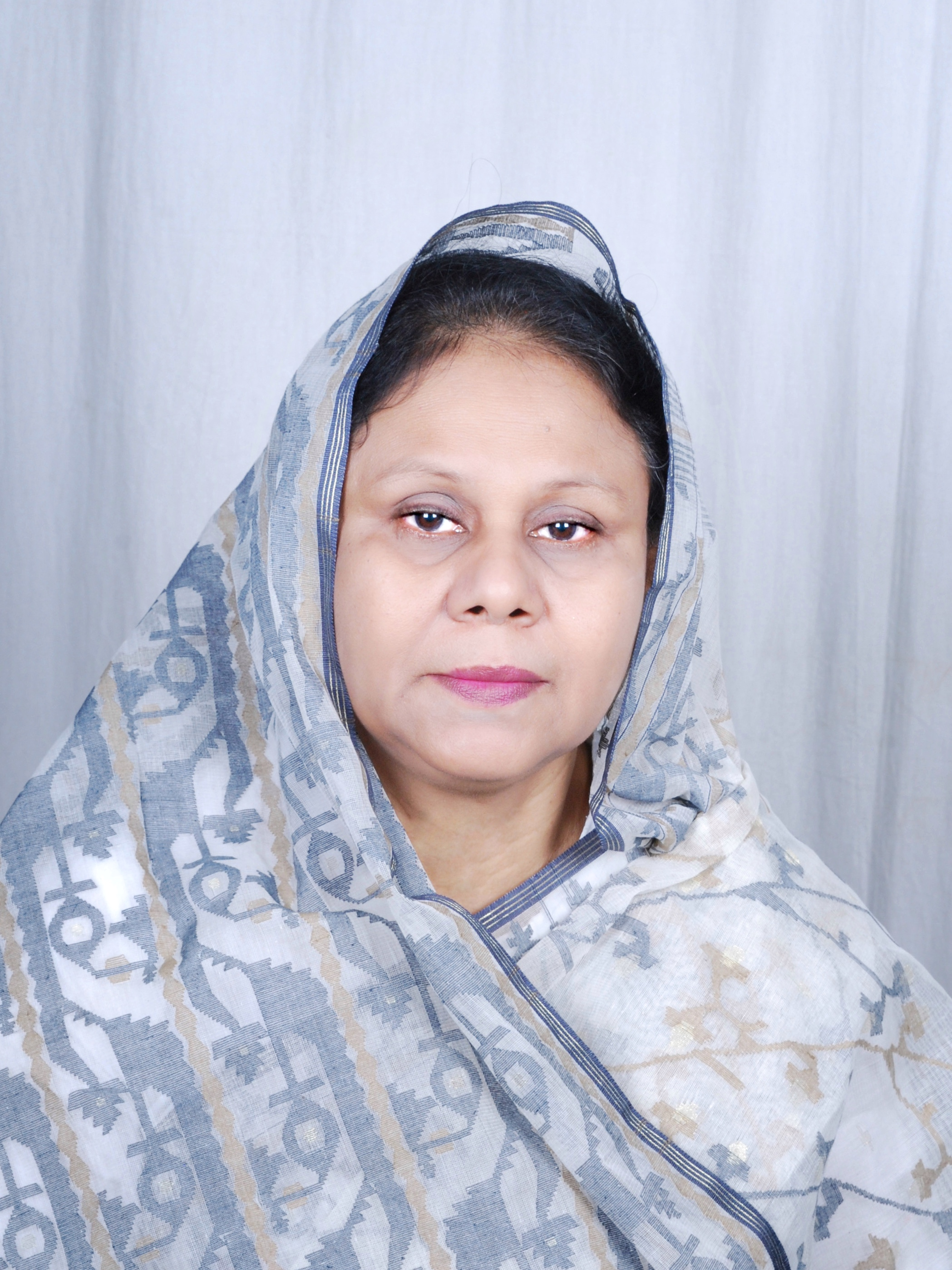

Member of the Bangladesh Parliament for Reserved Women's Seat-12
- In office 28 February 2024 – 6 August 2024
- Preceded by: Khadizatul Anwar

Personal details
- Born: 10 December 1972 (age 53) Narail District, Bangladesh
- Party: Bangladesh Awami League

Runu Reza (born 10 December 1972) is a Bangladesh Awami League politician and a former Jatiya Sangsad member from a women's reserved seat in 2024.

== Early life and family ==
Runu Reza was born on 10 December 1972 in Narail District. Her family had been freedom fighters in Khulna. Her father, late Sheikh Mohammad Rokon Uddin Ahmed was a freedom fighter, professor and social worker. Runu Reza is the younger sister of 17th Chief of Army Staff General SM Shafiuddin Ahmed.

Reza's daughter Fairooz Faizah Beether is the first Bangladeshi to win Goalkeepers Global Goals Changemaker Award by the Bill and Melinda Gates Foundation.

== Career ==
Reza was elected to Parliament on 27 February 2024 from women reserved seat as a Bangladesh Awami League candidate.
