= Nurul Alam Chowdhury =

Bangladeshi politician (1945–2019)

Nurul Alam Chowdhury নুরুল আলম চৌধুরী

MP of Chittagong-4
- In office 1973–1975
- Preceded by: Constituency Established
- Succeeded by: Jamal Uddin Ahmad
- In office 1986–1988
- Preceded by: Jamal Uddin Ahmad
- Succeeded by: Mazharul Haq Shah Chowdhury

Personal details
- Born: 21 May 1945 Gopalghata, Fatikchhari, Chittagong, Bengal Province, British India
- Died: 27 January 2019 (aged 73) Parkview Hospital, Chittagong, Bangladesh
- Party: Bangladesh Awami League
- Spouse: Rosy Alam
- Children: 3
- Parent(s): Matiur Rahman Chowdhury (Father); Waijunnesa Chowdhury (Mother)
- Education: Chittagong University
- Occupation: Politician; Diplomat

Nurul Alam Chowdhury (21 May 1945 – 27 January 2019) was a Bangladeshi politician, diplomat and freedom fighter who was elected twice as MP of Chittagong-4 in Jatiya Sangsad. He was also a former Bangladeshi Ambassador to Oman, and director of Rupali Bank.

== Early life and education ==
Nurul Alam Chowdhury was born on 21 May 1945 in a village of Fatikchhari Upazila of Chittagong District, Gopalghata to Matiur Rahman Chowdhury and Waijunnesa Chowdhury. He received his secondary education at Chittagong Muslim High School and Chittagong College, where he was inducted into politics for the first time.

He graduated from Chittagong University in history and received his Master's from the same university in 1969; he was part of the first group of post-graduate students. He was instrumental in establishing the university's branch of East Pakistan Chhatra League and was its first president.

== Politics ==
Chowdhury rendered voluntary services at Fatehabad College for some time, before becoming a full-fledged politician. After being arrested for partaking in a protest against Hamoodur Rahman Education Commission, he spent some time in jail.

He was thereafter inducted as the vice-chief of the Chattagram Awami League volunteer unit, wherein he played an integral role in building public opinion around their political goals. Pursuant to the 7 March Speech of Bangabandhu, he helped in the launching of a mass-scale civil disobedience movement and took active part in blockades and demonstrations.

As Pakistan responded with force to stop the insurgency, he joined the Liberation War of Bangladesh and after receiving training from Bagafa Camp in India was entrusted with the responsibilities of running a youth-refugee camp in Agartala.

After the end of the war that led to the independence of Bangladesh, he was selected for government service having been successful in the BCS Examination. Despite his success, Chowdhury decided to stay in politics, on the personal advice of Bangabandhu. He was elected as MP of Chittagong-4 at the age of 27 in 1973. He was the youngest member in the 1st Jatiya Sangsad.

For protesting against the Assassination of Sheikh Mujibur Rahman he was sent to jail in 1975. He was elected again as MP of Chittagong-4. He was appointed a Director of Rupali Bank in 1997. He was also appointed Bangladeshi Ambassador to Oman in 2010. He was the Chairman of Chittagong University Registered Graduate Forum. Chowdhury affiliated with other organizations such as the Bangladesh Tea Board, Bangladesh Red Crescent Society, Chittagong Association of Dhaka, Family Planning Commission and others.

== Personal life ==
Nurul Alam Chowdhury was married to Rosy Alam. They had one daughter and two sons.

== Death ==
Chowdhury died on 27 January 2019 at the age of 73, in Parkview Hospital, Chittagong.
