= Ramesh Shil =

Bengali singer-songwriter (1877–1968)

- রমেশ শীল
- Born: 1877; Gomadandi village, Chittagong District, Bengal Presidency, British India
- Died: April 6, 1967 (aged 89–90)
- Awards: Ekushey Padak

Ramesh Shil (1877 – April 6, 1967) was a Bengali bard. He belonged to the class of bards, called Kabiyals, who improvised songs in poetic contests evolved in Calcutta and its outskirts in the 18th and the 19th centuries, and also became known for his composition of songs in the Maizbhandari, a musical tradition based in Chittagong. He was awarded Ekushey Padak in 2002 by the Government of Bangladesh.

== Background and career ==
Shil was born to Chandi Charan Shil and Rajkumari Shil at Gomadandi village of Chittagong District. Shil got his breakthrough in 1945 when he defeated Sheikh Gumani in a song contest arranged by the Nikhil Bharat Banga Sahitya Sammelan in Calcutta. In the contest, they improvised verses and hurled strophes and antistrophes at each other.

== Works ==
Shil composed about 350 Maizbhandari songs praising the Maizbhandari order and its proponent Ahmed Ullah Maizbhandari. These songs had been published in nine volumes titled Ashekmala, Shantibhandar, Muktir Darbar, Nure Duniya, Jibansathi, Satyadarpan, Bhandare Maula, Manab Bandhu and Eshke Sirajia.

Shil wrote notable songs like "Ishkul Khuilachhe Re Maula".

Bulbul Lalitakala Academy honored him as the Greatest Bard in 1962.

== Personal life ==
Shil first married Apurba Mohini in 1900. They had one daughter Shailbala. After early deaths of next two daughters and one son, he married for the second time. From the second marriage with Abola Bala, they had four sons and two daughters.
