= Aslam Chowdhury =

Bangladeshi politician

Aslam Chowdhury FCA

Adviser to the Chairperson of Bangladesh Nationalist Party
- Incumbent
- Assumed office 2024
- Chairperson: Khaleda Zia (2024–2025); Tarique Rahman (2026–present)
- Secretary General: Mirza Fakhrul Islam Alamgir

Interim President of Bijoy Smarani College
- Incumbent
- Assumed office 2024
- Chancellor: President of Bangladesh
- Vice-Chancellor: A S M Amanullah

Joint Secretary General of the Bangladesh Nationalist Party
- In office 2016–2024
- Chairperson: Khaleda Zia
- Secretary General: Mirza Fakhrul Islam Alamgir

District Governor of Lions International
- In office 2010–2011
- President: Sid L. Scruggs III

Personal details
- Born: Faujdarhat, Chittagong
- Party: Bangladesh Nationalist Party
- Spouse: Jamila N. Mowla
- Children: 1
- Education: University of Chittagong
- Occupation: Accountant, politician, industrialist
- Awards: Melvin Jones Fellowship

Aslam Chowdhury (Bengali: আসলাম চৌধুরী) is a Bangladeshi politician, chartered accountant, and industrialist. He serves as an Adviser to the Chairperson of the Bangladesh Nationalist Party and previously held the position of joint secretary-general.

Chowdhury is a former District Governor for Lions International. In August 2024, he was released from an eight-year imprisonment following the Student–People's uprising. His detention under the Sheikh Hasina administration, which began in 2016, was widely described by political observers and human rights organizations as politically motivated.

== Early life and education ==
Chowdhury was born in Faujdarhat, Chittagong, to Golam Hossain Chowdhury and Halima Khatun Chowdhury. He completed his postgraduate education at the University of Chittagong, obtaining a Master of Commerce (MCom) degree. After successfully passing the Bangladesh Civil Service (BCS) examination, he began his professional career as a teacher within the government's education cadre.

In 1996, Chowdhury resigned from the civil service to qualify as a chartered accountant. He subsequently became a Fellow Chartered Accountant (FCA) with The Institute of Chartered Accountants of Bangladesh (ICAB). He transitioned into the private sector, serving in senior financial roles at Kabir Steel and Confidence Cement, where he eventually held the position of chief financial officer (CFO).

=== Business career ===
Chowdhury later established Confidence Salt, which served as the foundational entity of the Rising Group, a Chittagong-based industrial conglomerate. His business portfolio expanded significantly to include ship recycling, steel re-rolling, and refueling sectors. Key assets under the group include the Confidence Salt Factory in Boalkhali, Rising Steel Mills, and Sonali CNG stations in Sitakunda. He also developed interests in the hospitality and agriculture sectors, including the Inani Resort in Harbang and fish preservation facilities in the Nasirabad and Sagarika areas of Chittagong.

==== Operational challenges (2016–2024) ====
During the administration of Sheikh Hasina, the Rising Group faced severe operational disruptions and financial strain. Following Chowdhury's arrest in 2016, his business entities were subjected to systemic crackdowns and interference by political operatives associated with the Awami League.

The prolonged imprisonment of the group's chairman led to a forced cessation of several core business activities. During this period, the companies accrued substantial financial losses and mounting interest on liabilities. Reports indicated that the group's subsidiaries faced localized looting of assets and administrative halting of production lines, which exacerbated the economic burden on the conglomerate during the Hasina tenure.

==== Recovery and financial restructuring (2024–present) ====
Following the 2024 uprising and his subsequent release, Chowdhury initiated a comprehensive recovery plan for the Rising Group. The companies have resumed operations, and the management has been engaged in resolving pending financial matters.

In 2025, the group entered into restructuring agreements with major financial institutions to resolve outstanding debts and accrued interest. Under the current oversight, business activities in the steel and ship-breaking sectors have shown a promising recovery. Key factories and refueling stations in Sitakunda have returned to full productivity, with the conglomerate reporting stabilized revenue streams as of early 2026.

== Political career ==
Chowdhury was elected (pending EC clearance) as the Member of Parliament for Chittagong-4 in the 2026 Bangladeshi general election. He currently serves as an Adviser to the Chairperson of the Bangladesh Nationalist Party.

=== Early career and 2008 election ===
Chowdhury entered active politics in 2001 following the formation of the Four Party Alliance government. He made his first parliamentary bid in the 2008 Bangladeshi general election for the Chittagong-4 constituency. Representing the BNP, he received 112,930 votes, finishing as the runner-up in the contest.

=== Party leadership and detention (2014–2024) ===
In 2014, Chowdhury was appointed as the convener of the BNP's Chittagong North District unit. In April 2016, his role was further formalised when he was promoted to Joint Secretary General of the party's National Executive Committee.

On 15 May 2016, Chowdhury was arrested in Dhaka by the Detective Branch during the administration of the Awami League, a political organisation subsequently banned in May 2025 under the Anti-Terrorism Act. His detention followed the circulation of photographs showing him at a social event in India with an Israeli politician. Chowdhury denied allegations of a political conspiracy, maintaining that the encounter was accidental and social in nature.

Over the following eight years, he was implicated in 76 separate legal cases. Human rights organisations and the BNP leadership described his prolonged incarceration as a "political vendetta" by the regime of Sheikh Hasina, who was convicted in absentia for crimes against humanity in November 2025.

=== Release and election (2024–2026) ===
In June 2024, while still in custody, Chowdhury was appointed as an Adviser to the BNP Chairperson. Following the Student–People's uprising, he was released from Chittagong Central Jail on 20 August 2024.

Chowdhury contested the 2026 Bangladeshi general election as the BNP candidate for Chittagong-4. Despite a legal challenge to his candidacy, the Appellate Division of the Supreme Court cleared him to run on 3 February 2026. In the election held on 12 February 2026, he won the seat in the Jatiya Sangsad, securing 142,674 votes.

However, the Bangladesh Election Commission suspended the results citing unresolved civil cases against him.

== Electoral history ==
General Election 2026: Chittagong-4
Party	Candidate	Votes	%	±%
BNP	Aslam Chowdhury	142,674	61.51	+49.84
Jamaat	Anowar Siddiqui Chowdhury	89,268	38.49	+32.29
Majority		53,406	23.02	−53.28
Turnout		231,942	51.73	−13.64
Registered electors		448,380		
BNP gain from AL				

General Election 2008: Chittagong-4
Party	Candidate	Votes	%	±%
AL	ABM Abul Kashem	136,298	54.4	+18.5
BNP	Aslam Chowdhury	112,930	45.0	−18.8
CPB	Md. Macheuddulla	850	0.3	N/A
National People's Party	Kazi Mohammal Eusuf Alam	435	0.2	N/A
Independent	Sachindra Lal Dey	213	0.1	N/A
Majority		23,368	9.3	−18.6
Turnout		250,726	81.8	+14.0
AL gain from BNP				
