= Sarowar Alamgir =

Bangladeshi politician and businessman

- সরোয়ার আলমগীর
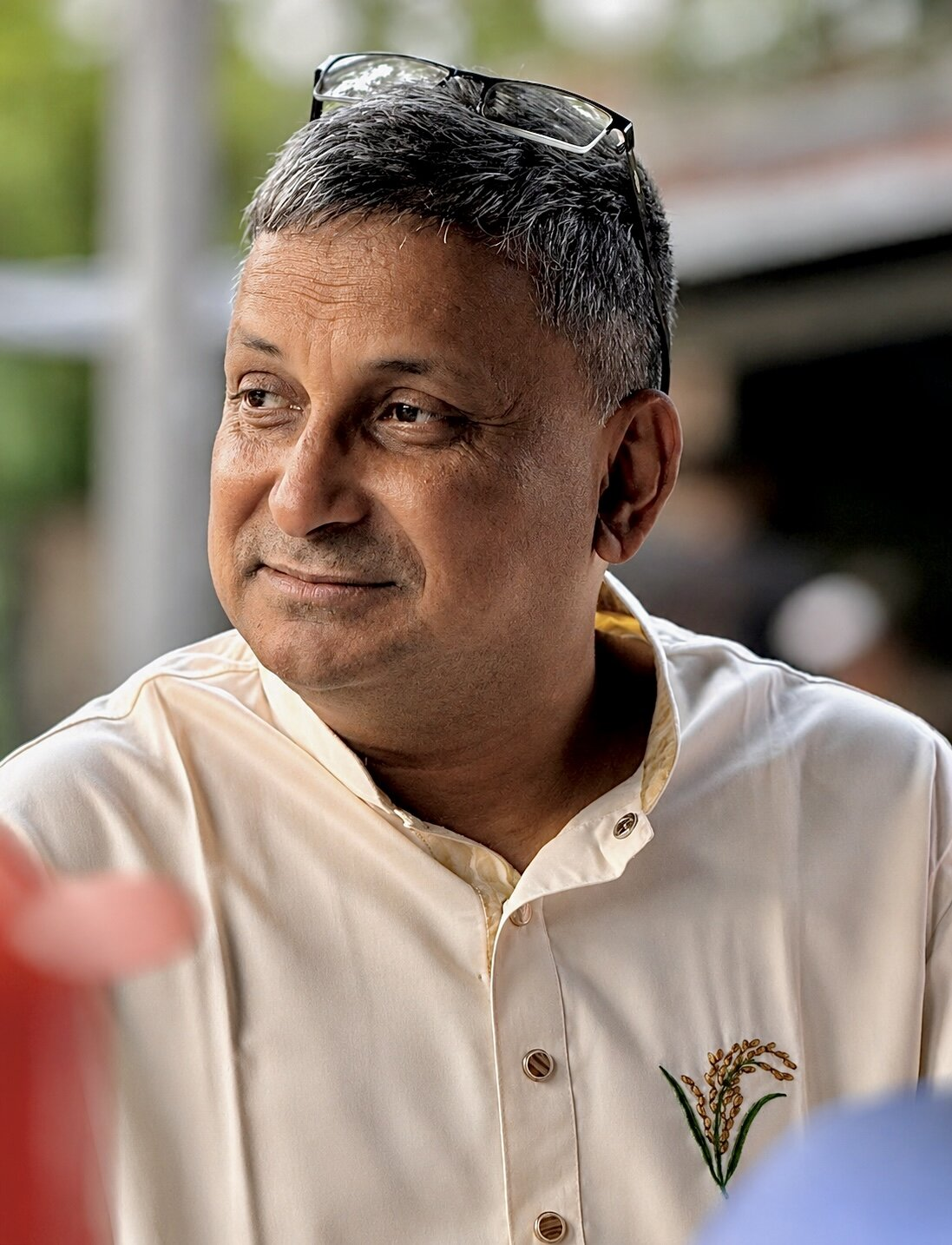

Member of Parliament
- Incumbent
- Assumed office 9 July 2026
- Preceded by: Khadizatul Anwar
- Constituency: Chittagong-2

Personal details
- Born: Fatikchhari, Chittagong, East Pakistan
- Party: Bangladesh Nationalist Party
- Occupation: Politician, businessman

Sarowar Alamgir (Bengali: সরোয়ার আলমগীর) is a Bangladeshi politician who serves as the member of parliament for the Chittagong-2 constituency in the Jatiya Sangsad. He is a member of the Bangladesh Nationalist Party (BNP). In addition to his political career, he is a businessman and the founder and chief executive officer (CEO) of Halda Group, a Chattogram-based industrial conglomerate operating in the ready-made garments, garments accessories, textile manufacturing, and real estate sectors.

== Political life ==
Sarowar Alamgir is a member of the Bangladesh Nationalist Party (BNP). He has participated in the party's political activities in Chattogram and contested the 2026 Bangladeshi general election from the Chittagong-2 constituency. He was elected as the Member of Parliament for Chattogram-2 and took the oath of office on 9 July 2026.

== Business career ==
Sarowar Alamgir is the founder and chief executive officer of Halda Group, a Chattogram-based industrial conglomerate. He established the company in the mid-1990s and expanded its operations into the ready-made garments, garments accessories and real estate sectors. According to The Business Standard, Halda Group has developed into a diversified industrial enterprise operating multiple business units and employing thousands of workers in Bangladesh.
