= Mustafizur Rahman Siddiqi =

Bangladeshi diplomat

- মোস্তাফিজুর রহমান সিদ্দিকী

Ambassador of Bangladesh to the United States
- In office September 1975 – August 1978
- Preceded by: M Hossain Ali
- Succeeded by: Tabarak Husain

1st Minister for Commerce and Foreign Trade
- In office 1972–1973

Member of Bangladesh Parliament from Chittagong-2
- In office 7 March 1973 – 6 November 1975
- Preceded by: Position created
- Succeeded by: L. K. Siddiqi

Member of Pakistan National Assembly from NE-71 (Chittagong-I)
- In office 8 June 1962 – 1964
- Succeeded by: Moulvi Sultan Ahmed

Personal details
- Born: 1 March 1925 Sitakunda, Bengal Presidency, British India (present day Chittagong, Bangladesh)
- Died: 6 February 1992 (aged 66) Dhaka, Bangladesh
- Spouse: Begum Latifa Siddiqi

Mustafizur Rahman Siddiqi (Bengali: মোস্তাফিজুর রহমান সিদ্দিকী; 1 March 1925 – 6 February 1992) was a Bangladeshi entrepreneur, politician, and diplomat. He set up a number of manufacturing and finance businesses during the 1960s. He played a prominent role in the Bangladesh Liberation War of 1971, organising resistance within Bangladesh and travelling to the U.S. to represent the Bangladesh Government in exile. He became Minister of Commerce and Foreign Trade in the newly formed state, and ambassador to the U.S. and Mexico.

== Early life ==
Siddiqi was born on 1 March 1925 in Sitakunda, Chittagong (then East Bengal, now Bangladesh). He was the son of Mohammad Hossain Chowdhury. After his schooling in Sitakunda, he pursued higher education in Calcutta, India. He completed his M.Com. from Calcutta University in 1947. He served as a lecturer at Dhaka University from 1948 to 1950. He then went on to take a degree in commerce from London University and followed with the final examination of the Institute of Chartered Accountants of England and Wales in 1954. He was elected a member of both the Royal Economic Society and the Royal Statistics Society.

== Career ==
His career as an entrepreneur started in 1962, and he played a leading role in the establishment of a number of new ventures as managing director and/or chairman. These companies were A.K. Khan Jute Mills Ltd, Eastern Insurance Company Ltd. (now part of Sadharan Bima Corporation), S.K.M Jute Mills Ltd, National Motors Ltd, Crescent Motors Ltd, Therapeutics (Bangladesh) Ltd, Sidko Limited (Trading Division), Sidko Limited (Garments Division), Federal Insurance Company Ltd, Sponsor Director of the Eastern, Mercantile Bank Ltd. (First East Pakistani Bank, at present Pubali Bank Ltd.), founding vice-chairman of Al-Baraka Bank Bangladesh Ltd.

Siddiqi was elected member of the Pakistan National Assembly in 1962 as an independent candidate. He joined the Awami League Party in 1964 and was elected as its treasurer. He was also president of the Chittagong District Awami League from 1964 to 1972. He was again elected member of the National Assembly of Pakistan in 1970 and member of Bangladesh Parliament from the Chittagong-2 constituency in 1973.

As president of District Awami League and convener of Sangram Parishad of Chittagong, Siddiqi organised the resistance against the Pakistan Army and helped establish the Swadhin Bangla Betar Kendra (radio station) at Kalurghat. He was the chairman of the Eastern zone (command) comprising five districts of Chittagong Division and districts of Barisal, Faridpur, and Dhaka. In July 1971, he was sent to the United States and to Canada as an envoy of the exiled government to lobby support from the governments of both nations.

After the liberation of Bangladesh in 1972, he was appointed Minister for Commerce and Foreign Trade in the first Bangabandhu cabinet. In 1973, as special envoy of the Prime Minister Sheikh Mujibur Rahman, he met the heads of state and governments of the U.S., Canada, Britain, Italy, France, and West Germany and lobbied for the repatriation of stranded Bangladeshis from Pakistan. He was appointed ambassador to the U.S. and Mexico in July 1975 by the Bangladesh Government. In 1980, he retired from politics.

== Social work ==
M. R. Siddiqi was also known for his social work. He joined the Lions movement in the then East Pakistan when it was founded in 1958 and became president of Chittagong Lions Club. When a devastating cyclone and tidal bore hit the coastal areas of Chittagong (Halishahar, Kattali, and Sitakunda) in 1960, it was under his leadership that a massive relief operation was undertaken, for which he was awarded "The Lions Humanitarian Award", the most prestigious in Lions International, and was also made an honorary "International Counselor". Through his initiative a separate provisional Lions District 305E (Pakistan) was formed in 1962, with him elected as the first District Governor.

In 1966, Siddiqi formed the "Chittagong Lions Foundation", the first such foundation in the history of Lionism. The Chittagong Lions Eye Hospital (the foundation stone was laid by Siddiqi on 5 January 1963) was initiated by the Lions of South East Asia and Indo-Pak Sub-continent. Subsequently, The Bangladesh Lions Foundation and The Lions Eye Hospital at Agargaon, Dhaka were established in 1983, again under the chairmanship of Siddiqi. After the emergence of Bangladesh in 1972, Siddiqi again took the lead in organising the Lions Clubs. He served as District Governor of District 315E from 1972 to 1974, and together with his friend, Deputy District Governor Mohammed Khaled, he re-organized and formed new clubs all over Bangladesh. He was the Forum Chairman of "The 17th Africa and South West Asia Lions International Forum" held in Dhaka in 1989.

== Other organisations ==
Apart from Lions, he was president of OISCA (Bangladesh Chapter), chairman of the Under-Privileged Children Education Programme (UCEP), and founder of Latifa Siddiqi Girls College and Girls High School of Kumira, Sitakunda. He held many leadership positions in associations and organisations of various types, including presidency of the Insurance Association of Pakistan, Metropolitan Chamber of Commerce and Industry, and Bangladesh Aushad Shilpa Samity. He was also the founder president of the Bangladesh Japan Friendship Society. He was the governor of the Bangladesh Chamber of Industries, which he helped to establish in 1985.

== Personal life ==
Mustafizur Rahman Siddiqi was married to Begum Latifa Siddiqi, eldest daughter of industrialist and former Pakistani minister A.K Khan.

== Death ==
Siddiqi died at the age of 66 on 6 February 1992 in Dhaka.
