= Khadizatul Anwar =

Bangladeshi politician

Khadizatul Anwar Sony
- খাদিজাতুল আনোয়ার সনি

Member of Parliament
- In office 30 January 2024 – 6 August 2024
- Preceded by: Najibul Bashar Maizbhandari
- Succeeded by: Sarowar Alamgir
- Constituency: Chittagong-2
- In office 20 February 2019 – 30 January 2024
- Preceded by: Salina Begum
- Succeeded by: Runu Reza
- Constituency: Reserved Women's Seat-6

Personal details
- Born: 18 April 1985 (age 41) Fatikchhari, Chittagong, Bangladesh
- Party: Bangladesh Awami League
- Parent: Rafiqul Anwar (father)
- Education: B.B.A, M.B.A
- Occupation: Business

Khadizatul Anwar Sony (born 18 April 1985) is a Bangladeshi politician. She is a former member of Jatiya Sangsad representing the Chittagong-2 constituency. Earlier, she was a member of parliament from the reserved women's seat-1 in the 11th Parliament.

== Career ==
Khadizatul Anwar Sony was born to Awami League politician and former member of the parliament Rafiqul Anwar. She was elected to parliament from Chittagong District representing the Reserved Women's Seat–6 in 2019.

Khadiza was detained on 1 August 2023 in Muscat, Oman on charges of holding a political meeting without permission. She was released after 12 hours.

== Personal life ==
Khadiza is married to Pervez Alam and they have two daughters. In June 2021, a Chittagong court issued arrest warrants against Pervez and his father, Shah Alam, for embezzling Tk15 crore from One Bank Limited. According to the charges, they took the loan from the bank's Khatunganj branch citing "M/S Shaon Enterprise" to import consumer goods. Shah Alam already had 54 cases against him by eight banks for default loans of total about Tk300 crore.
