= SM Al Mamun =

Bangladeshi politician

- মামুন
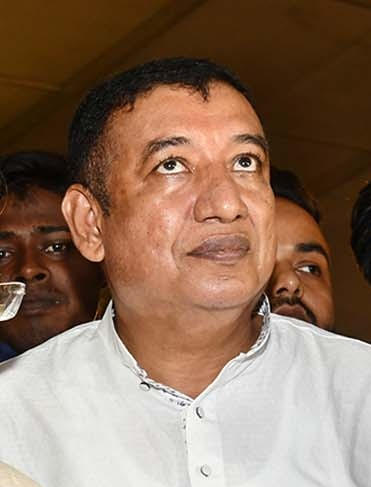
- Mamun in 2021

Member of Parliament
- In office 29 January 2024 – 6 August 2024
- Constituency: Chittagong-4

Personal details
- Born: 17 August 1967 (age 59)
- Occupation: Businessman and Politician

SM Al Mamun is a Bangladeshi businessman, industrialist and politician whose business activities include shipbreaking, hospitality and trading. He has had associations with Bangladesh’s shipbreaking and recycling industry and served as vice-president of the Bangladesh Ship Breakers and Recyclers Association (BSBRA).

Mamun served as chairman of the Sitakunda Upazila Parishad before being elected to the Jatiya Sangsad from Chattogram in the 2024 Bangladeshi general election.

He then served as a member of the 12th National Parliament until its dissolution on 6 August 2024.

== Career ==
He is the owner of S.M. Ship Breakers in Chattogram and has been involved in Bangladesh’s shipbreaking and recycling industry. He served as vice-president of the Bangladesh Ship Breakers and Recyclers Association (BSBRA).

Mamun has also served as managing director of SRS Ship Breakers. In November 2023, he was elected to the executive committee of the BSBRA at the association’s 40th annual general meeting.

In local government, Mamun served as chairman of the Sitakunda Upazila Parishad. He was later nominated for the Chattogram-4 constituency as an Awami League candidate in the 2024 Bangladeshi general election and was elected to the Jatiya Sangsad as a member of parliament. He represented Chattogram-4 in the 12th Jatiya Sangsad until its dissolution on 6 August 2024.
