= City Gate, Chittagong =

Gate in Chittagong, Bangladesh

Coordinates: 22.3738°N 91.7734°E

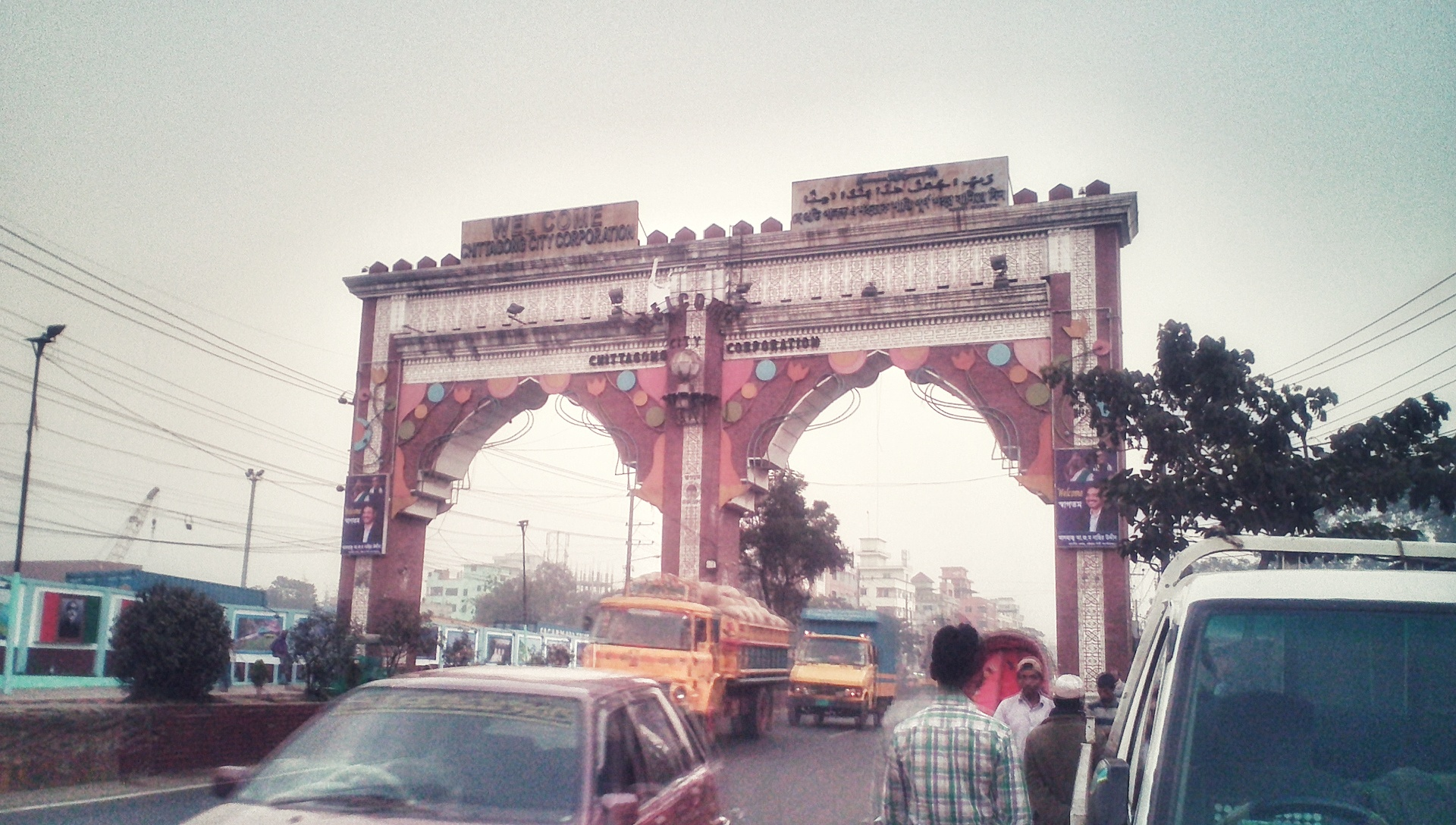
The gate in the evening

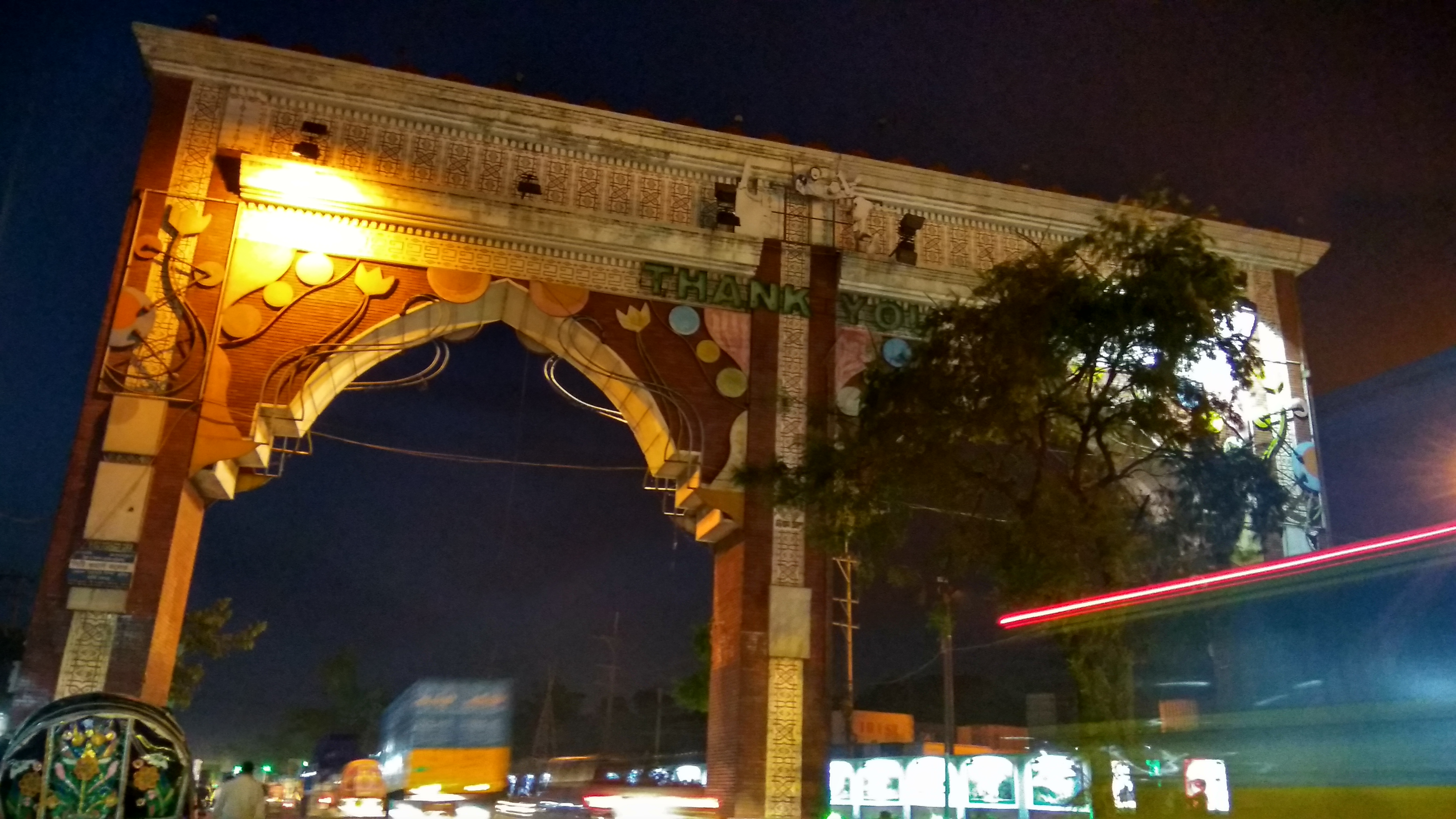
The gate at night

City Gate, Chittagong (Bengali: চট্টগ্রাম সিটি গেইট) is a gate located in Chittagong. It is a symbol of the city area and welcomes every visitor to the city. It connects Chittagong City with Sitakunda Upazila to the north and the Colonel Hat area is next to it. Recently, the panel mayor took some steps to beautify the city gate area.
