= Mazharul Haq Shah Chowdhury =

Bangladeshi politician

Member of Bangladesh Parliament
- In office 1988–1991

Personal details
- Party: Jatiya Party (Ershad)

Mazharul Haq Shah Chowdhury is a Jatiya Party (Ershad) politician in Bangladesh and a former member of parliament for Chittagong-2.

== Career ==
Chowdhury was elected to parliament from Chittagong-4 in 1988. In 2004, he was appointed vice-chairman of Jatiya Party.
