= Chittagong-2 =

Constituency of Bangladesh's Jatiya Sangsad

Coordinates: 22.69°N 91.80°E

- Constituency for the Jatiya Sangsad
- District: Chittagong District
- Division: Chittagong Division
- Electorate: 488,465 (2026)

Current constituency
- Created: 1973
- Party: Bangladesh Nationalist Party
- Member: Sarowar Alamgir
- ←278 Chittagong-1 280 Chittagong-3→

Chittagong-2 is a constituency represented in the Jatiya Sangsad (National Parliament) of Bangladesh since 2026 by Sarowar Alamgir of the Bangladesh Nationalist Party.

== Boundaries ==
The constituency encompasses Fatikchhari Upazila.

== History ==
The constituency was created for the first general elections in newly independent Bangladesh, held in 1973.

Ahead of the 2008 general election, the Election Commission redrew constituency boundaries to reflect population changes revealed by the 2001 Bangladesh census. The 2008 redistricting altered the boundaries of the constituency.

== Members of Parliament ==
Election	Member	Party
1973	Mustafizur Rahman Siddiqi	Awami League
1979	L. K. Siddiqi	Bangladesh Nationalist Party
1986	Ainul Kamal	Jatiya Party
1991	L. K. Siddiqi	Bangladesh Nationalist Party
Feb 1996	L. K. Siddiqi	Bangladesh Nationalist Party
	ABM Abul Kashem	Awami League
2001	L. K. Siddiqi	Bangladesh Nationalist Party
2008	Salahuddin Quader Chowdhury	Bangladesh Nationalist Party
2014	Syed Nazibul Bashar Maizvandary	Bangladesh Tarikat Federation
2018	Syed Nazibul Bashar Maizvandary	Bangladesh Tarikat Federation
2024	Khadizatul Anwar	Awami League
2026	Sarowar Alamgir	Bangladesh Nationalist Party

== Elections ==
=== Elections in the 2020s ===
General Election 2026: Chittagong-2 (Note: The vote counts reported by The Daily Inqilab are unofficial results. Amin challenged Alamgir's candidacy in court. On 3 February 2026, the Appellate Division, Supreme Court of Bangladesh, ruled that Alamgir could contest the election, but ordered the Election Commission to withhold the result until appeals were disposed of. On 9 July the High Court ruled in Alamgir's favour, the Election Commission declared him the winner, and he took the oath of office. As of September 2026, the Election Commission has yet to publish full official results.)
Party	Candidate	Votes	%	±%
BNP	Sarowar Alamgir	138,545	64.0	N/A
Jamaat	Mohammad Nurul Amin	62,160	28.7	N/A
BSP	Syed Saifuddin Ahmed	12,415	5.7	N/A
IAB	Julfiker Ali Mannan	2,169	1.0	N/A
Janotar Dol	Mohammad Golam Nowsher Ali	380	0.2	N/A
Independent	Jinnat Akhtar	270	0.1	N/A
Independent	Ahmed Kabir	262	0.1	N/A
GOP	Rabiul Hasan	251	0.1	N/A
Majority		76,385	35.3	N/A
Turnout		216,452		N/A
BNP gain from AL				

=== Elections in the 2010s ===
General Election 2018: Chittagong-2
Party	Candidate	Votes	%	±%
BTF	Syed Najibul Bashar Maizbhandari	238,430	82.65	−7.85
BNP	Md. Azimullah Bahar	49,753	17.25	+17.25
JP(E)	Johrul Islam Reza	340	0.12	+0.12
Majority		188,677	65.40	−16.10
Turnout		288,523	76.65	+34.15
Registered electors		376,485		
BTF hold				

General Election 2014: Chittagong-2
Party	Candidate	Votes	%	±%
BTF	Syed Najibul Bashar Maizbhandari	125,351	90.5	+90.5
Independent	Mahmud Hasan	12,433	9.0	+9.0
Independent	Md. Nazim Uddin	731	0.5	+0.5
Majority		112,918	81.5	+72.2
Turnout		138,515	42.5	−42.6
BTF gain from BNP				

=== Elections in the 2000s ===
General Election 2008: Chittagong-2
Party	Candidate	Votes	%	±%
BNP	Salahuddin Quader Chowdhury	129,333	58.1	+8.8
AL	ATM Pearul Islam	92,266	41.4	+7.8
Gano Forum	Md. Liakat Ali Chowdhury	1,098	0.5	N/A
Majority		37,067	9.3	−6.4
Turnout		222,697	85.1	+8.7
BNP hold				

General Election 2001: Chittagong-2
Party	Candidate	Votes	%	±%
BNP	L. K. Siddiqi	67,512	49.3	+8.1
AL	ABM Abul Kashem	46,045	33.6	−9.9
Independent	Md. Nurul Mostafa Kamal Chowdhury	16,424	12.0	N/A
IJOF	Md. Didarul Kabir	4,971	3.6	N/A
BIF	Abul Asad Mohammad Jobair	1,505	1.1	+0.6
CPB	Md. Masiuddowla	231	0.2	N/A
Jatiya Party (M)	Mir Md. Nowshad Uddin	126	0.1	N/A
JSD	Saiful Akter	105	0.1	N/A
Majority		21,467	15.7	+13.4
Turnout		136,919	76.4	−0.2
BNP gain from AL				

=== Elections in the 1990s ===
General Election June 1996: Chittagong-2
Party	Candidate	Votes	%	±%
AL	ABM Abul Kashem	45,478	43.5	+7.5
BNP	L. K. Siddiqi	43,121	41.2	−4.6
JP(E)	Md. Didarul Kabir	7,602	7.3	+3.1
Jamaat	Md. Shafiqul Moulah	7,488	7.2	−3.4
BIF	Md. Musa Al Kaderi	574	0.5	N/A
IOJ	Md. Khairul Islam Chowdhury	159	0.2	N/A
Independent	Md. Fakhrul Uddin Chowhury	121	0.1	N/A
Zaker Party	Md. Nurul Alam Chowdhury	92	0.1	N/A
Majority		2,357	2.3	−7.6
Turnout		104,635	76.6	+18.4
AL gain from BNP				

General Election 1991: Chittagong-2
Party	Candidate	Votes	%	±%
BNP	L. K. Siddiqi	36,855	45.8	
AL	ABM Abul Kashem	28,928	36.0	
Jamaat	Md. Shafiqul Moulah	8,549	10.6	
JP(E)	Fazlul Kader	3,396	4.2	
Independent	Kazi Khairul Alam	2,289	2.8	
BAKSAL	Nur Ahmed	168	0.2	
Jatiya Samajtantrik Dal-JSD	Gazi Md. Sekandar	130	0.2	
Jatiya Biplobi Front	Fazlul Kader	79	0.1	
Majority		7,927	9.9	
Turnout		80,394	58.2	
BNP gain from JP(E)				
