= Rafiqul Anwar =

Bangladeshi politician

Member of Parliament for Chittagong-4
- In office 14 July 1996 – 27 October 2006
- Preceded by: Syed Nozibul Bosor
- Succeeded by: Anisul Islam Mahmud

Personal details
- Born: c. 1955
- Died: 25 October 2012 Dhaka, Bangladesh
- Party: Bangladesh Awami League
- Children: Khadizatul Anwar

Rafiqul Anwar (c. 1955 - 25 October 2012) was a Bangladesh Awami League politician and served as a Jatiya Sangsad member representing the Chittagong-4 constituency for two consecutive terms.

== Career ==
Anwar was elected to parliament from Chittagong-4 as a Bangladesh Awami League candidate in 1996 and 2001. He served as the vice-president of the Chittagong District unit of the Bangladesh Awami League. He was the chairman of Chittagong Abahani.

== Death ==
Anwar died on 25 October 2012 in Square Hospital, Dhaka, Bangladesh.
