= Chittagong-4 =

Constituency of Bangladesh's Jatiya Sangsad

Coordinates: 22.61°N 91.66°E

- Constituency for the Jatiya Sangsad
- District: Chittagong District
- Division: Chittagong Division
- Electorate: 448,380 (2026)

Current constituency
- Created: 1973
- Member: Vacant (Note: Election Commission has postponed the results.)
- ← 280 Chittagong-3 282 Chittagong-5 →

Chittagong-4 is a constituency represented in the Jatiya Sangsad (National Parliament) of Bangladesh. Since 6 August 2024, the constituency remains vacant.

== Boundaries ==
The constituency encompasses Sitakunda Upazila and Chittagong City Corporation wards 9 and 10.

== History ==
The constituency was created for the first general elections in newly independent Bangladesh, held in 1973.

Ahead of the 2014 general election, the Election Commission renumbered the seat for Sandwip Upazila from Chittagong-16 to Chittagong-3, bumping up by one the suffix of the former constituency of that name and the higher numbered constituencies in the district. Previously Chittagong-4 encompassed Bayazid Thana and Hathazari Upazila.

== Members of Parliament ==
Election	Member	Party
1973	Nurul Alam Chowdhury	Awami League
1979	Jamal Uddin Ahmad	Bangladesh Nationalist Party
1986	Nurul Alam Chowdhury	Awami League
1988	Mazharul Haq Shah Chowdhury	Jatiya Party
1991	Syed Nazibul Bashar Maizvandary	Awami League
Feb 1996	Syed Najibul Bashar Maizbhandari	Bangladesh Nationalist Party
Jun 1996	Rafiqul Anwar	Awami League
Major Boundary Changes
2008	Anisul Islam Mahmud	Jatiya Party (Ershad)
Major Boundary Changes
2014	Didarul Alam	Awami League
2018	Didarul Alam	Awami League
2024	SM Al Mamun	Awami League

== Elections ==
=== Elections in the 2020s ===
General Election 2026: Chittagong-4
Party	Candidate	Votes	%	±%
BNP	Aslam Chowdhury			N/A
Jamaat	Anowar Siddiqui Chowdhury			N/A
BIF	Md. Sirajuddaula			N/A
BSP	Md. Shahidul Islam Chowdhury			N/A
CPB	Md. Machiuddoula			N/A
GSA	Zahidul Alam			N/A
GOP	ATM Parvez			N/A
IAB	Md. Didarul Mawla			N/A
NIP	Md. Zakaria Khaled			N/A
Majority				N/A
Turnout				N/A
Registered electors		448,380		

=== Elections in the 2010s ===
General Election 2018: Chittagong-4
Party	Candidate	Votes	%	±%
AL	Didarul Alam	226,118	87.97	+7.0
BNP	Aslam Chowdhury	30,014	11.67	−1.0
JP(E)	Md. Didarul Kabir	907	0.35	−0.1
Majority		196,104	76.30	−6.7
Turnout		257,039	65.37	+19.3
Registered electors		393,228		
AL hold				

General Election 2014: Chittagong-4 (Note: Sources vary with regard to the 2014 vote count. They report between 153,391 and 153,815 votes for the winner, and between 1,250 and 6,848 votes for the Jatiya Party (Manju) candidate, but the discrepancies in the figures are not large enough to change the overall outcome.)
Party	Candidate	Votes	%	±%
AL	Didarul Alam	153,391	95.1	+40.7%
JSD	AFM Mafijur Rahman	4,462	2.8	N/A
WPB	Mohammad Didarul Alam Chowdhury	2,212	1.4	N/A
Jatiya Party (M)	AAM Haydar Ali Chowdhury	1,250	0.8	N/A
Majority		148,929	83.0	+83.0%
Turnout		161,279	46.1	−35.7%
AL gain from BNP				

=== Elections in the 2000s ===
General Election 2008: Chittagong-4
Party	Candidate	Votes	%	±%
JP(E)	Anisul Islam Mahmud	132,168	53.6	N/A
BNP	Sayed Wahidul Alam	106,975	43.4	+0.7
BIF	Musaheb Uddin Baktiar	5,624	2.3	+1.8
IAB	Mohammad Rafique	977	0.4	N/A
Independent	Md. Jafar Alam Chowdhury	884	0.4	N/A
Majority		25,193	10.2	−3.0
Turnout		246,628	97.8	+28.0
JP(E) gain from AL				

General Election 2001: Chittagong-4
Party	Candidate	Votes	%	±%
AL	Rafiqul Anwar	108,011	55.9	+3.3
BNP	Syed Nazibul Bashar Maizvandary	82,518	42.7	+2.3
BIF	Fazlul Haq Islamabadi	990	0.5	+0.2
IJOF	Mazharul Haq Shah Chowdhury	892	0.5	N/A
Independent	M. Badiur Rahman	684	0.4	N/A
Majority		25,493	13.2	+1.0
Turnout		193,095	69.8	+57.6
AL hold				

=== Elections in the 1990s ===
General Election June 1996: Chittagong-4
Party	Candidate	Votes	%	±%
AL	Rafiqul Anwar	72,546	52.6	+5.5
BNP	Jamal Uddin Ahmed	55,703	40.4	−1.4
Jamaat	Jahangir Chowdhury	8,529	6.2	N/A
BIF	Md. Jasim Uddin	458	0.3	−1.1
JP(E)	Jahir Uddin Chowdhury	338	0.3	−1.7
Gano Forum	Md. Muzibul Haque	217	0.2	N/A
Zaker Party	Abdul Hye	163	0.1	N/A
Majority		16,843	12.2	+6.9
Turnout		137,954	70.0	+26.3
AL hold				

General Election 1991: Chittagong-4
Party	Candidate	Votes	%	±%
AL	Syed Nozibul Bosor	51,679	47.1	
BNP	Nuruchchhapa	45,894	41.8	
Independent	Salahuddin	3,940	3.6	
JP(E)	Kazi Sirajul Islam	2,222	2.0	
Bangladesh Janata Party	Jahangir Hossain	1,543	1.4	
BIF	Moin-Uddin	1,539	1.4	
WPB	Suja Uddin	1,534	1.4	
IOJ	Hafez Nurul Islam	932	0.8	
JSD	Rashid Ahamed	208	0.2	
Independent	Saleh Ahmad	151	0.1	
JSD (S)	Mazharul Haq Shah Chowdhury	74	0.1	
Democratic League	Mujibul Haq Chowdhury	74	0.1	
Majority		5,785	5.3	
Turnout		109,790	43.7	
AL gain from				
