= General elections in Bangladesh =

Jatiya Sangsad elections

General elections are held in Bangladesh to elect members of the Jatiya Sangsad, the unicameral national parliament. The Jatiya Sangsad consists of 300 members elected by first-past-the-post voting in single-member constituencies and 50 seats reserved for women, which are allocated based on the proportional vote share received by parties. Elections are overseen by the Bangladesh Election Commission.

== First general election ==
The first general elections were held in Bangladesh on 7 March 1973. The Awami League won the elections and secured 293 seats out of 300 where eleven members of the Jatiya Sangsad won freely without votes. 1091 candidates from 14 parties contested in this election. The total vote was 53.54%.

== Second general election ==
The second general elections were held in Bangladesh on 18 February 1979, under President Ziaur Rahman. The Bangladesh Nationalist Party won the election; They won 207 out of 300 seats in the Jatiya Sangsad.The total vote was 51.2%। In this election, Awami League (Malek) won 39 seats, Awami League (Mizan) 2, JSD 8, Muslim League and Democratic League 20, NAP (Muzaffar) 1, Bangladesh National League 2, Bangladesh Gano Front 2, Nationalist Democratic Movement (Bangladesh) 1, Bangladesh Ganatantrik Andolon 1, Jatiya Ekta Party 1 and independent candidates won 16 seats.

== Third general election ==
The third general elections were held in Bangladesh on 7 May 1986. A total of 1,527 candidates participated in the election. In the election, the Jatiya Party won 183 seats out of 300 seats. Voter turnout was 59.38% of the total electorate. The BNP, the winner of the previous election, boycotted this election.

== Fourth general election ==
The fourth general elections were held in Bangladesh on 3 March 1988. The election was boycotted by most of Bangladesh's major parties; For example, Bangladesh Awami League, Bangladesh Nationalist Party, Bangladesh Jamaat-e-Islami, Communist Party of Bangladesh, Bangladesh Krishak Sramik Awami League, Jatiya Awami Party (Muzaffar) and Bangladesh Workers Party. The Jatiya Party won the election, winning 251 out of 300 seats. Turnout was 54.92% of the total electorate.

== Fifth general election ==
The fifth general election in 1991 was held in Bangladesh on 27 February 1991. Bangladesh got a democratic government system through this election.This was the first election under a caretaker government. The election was led by two major parties, the Awami League, led by Sheikh Hasina; Bangladesh Nationalist Party (BNP) was led by Khaleda Zia. A total of 2,787 candidates from 75 parties, including 424 independent candidates, took part in the Jatiya Sangsad elections against 300 seats. The BNP led by Khaleda Zia won the election. They won 142 out of 300 seats. The total vote was 55.4%.

== Sixth general election ==
The sixth general elections were held in Bangladesh on 15 February 1996. Most opposition parties boycotted the election. Voter turnout was very low in the one-sided election. The Bangladesh Nationalist Party (BNP) won the election and won 300 out of 300 seats. Fair elections were held in June. It was the smallest parliament in the history of parliamentary politics in Bangladesh.

== Seventh general election ==
The seventh general elections were held in Bangladesh on June 12, 1996. The election was led by two major parties, the Awami League, led by Sheikh Hasina; Bangladesh Nationalist Party (BNP) was led by Khaleda Zia. A total of 2,574 candidates from 81 parties, including 281 independent candidates, took part in the election against 300 seats. The Awami League won 146 out of 300 seats. Independent candidates received 0.67% of the votes and party candidates 74.82%.

== Eighth general election ==
The eighth general elections were held in Bangladesh on October 1, 2001. The election was led by two major parties, the Awami League, led by Sheikh Hasina; Bangladesh Nationalist Party (BNP) was led by Khaleda Zia. A total of 1,935 candidates from 19 parties, including 484 independent candidates, took part in the election against 300 seats. This is the second election under the caretaker government introduced in 1996. Latifur Rahman was the head of the caretaker government when the election was held. Bangladesh Nationalist Party (BNP) won this election.

== Ninth general election ==
The ninth general elections in Bangladesh were held on 29 December 2008. The election was held under the military government led by Fakhruddin Ahmed, the chief adviser to the caretaker government. The military government declared a state of emergency in early 2007, which was lifted on 16 December 2008. Many national and international organizations were given the opportunity to observe the election in the ninth parliamentary election. And the Awami League won this election. 38 registered political parties including Awami League, BNP participated in this election. Voters were 8 crore 87 thousand 3 people. The vote was 87.13 percent.

== Tenth general election ==
The tenth general elections were held in Bangladesh on 5 January 2014. The election was boycotted by most parties, including the main opposition BNP, and carried out continuous hartal-blockade programs. 12 parties participated in that election. Awami League candidates won uncontested in 153 seats out of 300 seats. Voting was held in 18 thousand 208 polling stations of the remaining 147 constituencies. In 147 constituencies, an average of 40.04 percent votes were cast.

== Eleventh general election ==
The eleventh general elections in Bangladesh were held on 30 December 2018. In that election, Awami League won 257 seats.

== Twelfth general election ==
The twelfth general elections in Bangladesh were held on Sunday, January 7, 2024. The schedule was announced on November 15, 2023. According to the schedule, the last date for submission of nomination papers was November 30, and the date for scrutinizing them is December 1 to 4. The last date for withdrawal of candidature is December 17. Voting will take place three weeks later. It is mainly criticized at home and abroad as a one-sided election, in this election there was massive vote rigging, 27.15% voting was reported at 3 pm, but after 1 hour when the voting ended, it was reported that 41%, 13% votes in 1 hour, which is an example of rigging beyond imagination. Awami League won 222 seats, Jatiya Party 11, Workers Party 1, JSD 1, Kalyan Party 1 and independent candidates won 62 seats. The United States and the United Kingdom believe that the 12th parliamentary election in Bangladesh was not free and fair.

== Thirteenth general election ==
The thirteenth general election in Bangladesh was held in February 2026.

== See also ==
- List of constituencies of the Jatiya Sangsad
- Cabinet of Bangladesh
