= Ahmad Ullah Maizbhandari =

Islamic theologian from Bengal

Syed Ahmad Ullah Maizbhandari
- সৈয়দ আহমদ উল্লাহ মাইজভাণ্ডারী
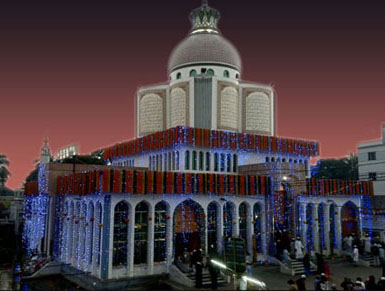
- Shrine of Syed Ahmed Ullah Maizbhandari

Personal life
- Born: 14 January 1826 Maizbhandar, Bengal Presidency, British India
- Died: 23 January 1906 (aged 80) Maizbhandar, Eastern Bengal and Assam, British India
- Resting place: Maizbhandar Darbar Sharif
- Flourished: Modern era
- Spouse: Syeda Alfunnisa Bibi Syeda Lutfunnissa Bibi

Religious life
- Religion: Islam
- Denomination: Sunni
- Founder of: Tariqa-e-Maizbhandaria
- Jurisprudence: Hanafi
- Tariqa: Qadiri; Maizbhandari

Muslim leader
- Based in: Maizbhandar Darbar Sharif
- Successor: Baba Bhandari (Nephew); Syed Delowar Hossain Maizbhandari (Grandson); Syed Emdadul Hoque Maizbhandari (great-grandchild) Syed Aminul Haque Wasel Maizvandari (Nephew)
- Arabic name
- Personal (Ism): Aḥmad Ullāh أحمد الله
- Patronymic (Nasab): ibn Muṭīʿ Ullāh ibn Ṭayyab Ullāh ibn ʿAbd al-Qādir ibn Ḥamīd ad-Dīn بن مطيع الله بن طيب الله بن عبد القادر بن حميد الدين
- Toponymic (Nisba): al-Māʾijbahandārī المائجبهنداري as-Sayyid السيد

Syed Ahmad Ullah Maizbhandari (Arabic: أحمد الله المائجبهنداري, Bengali: আহমদ উল্লাহ মাইজভাণ্ডারী; 14 January 1826 – 23 January 1906) was a Bengali Sufi saint and founder of the Maizbhandari Sufi order in Bengal.

== Ancestry ==
Ahmad Ullah's ancestors were Syeds and originally migrated from Madinah to Gaur, the erstwhile capital of medieval Bengal, via Baghdad and Delhi. His great-great-grandfather, Hamid ad-Din, was the appointed Imam and Qadi of Gaur, but due to a sudden epidemic in the city, Hamid later migrated to Patiya in Chittagong District. Hamid's son, Syed Abdul Qadir, was made the imam of Azimnagar in modern-day Fatikchhari. He had two sons; Syed Ataullah and Syed Tayyab Ullah. The latter had three sons; Syed Ahmad, Syed Matiullah and Syed Abdul Karim, and the second son was the father of Syed Ahmad Ullah Maizbhandari.

== Early life and education ==
Ahmad Ullah Maizbhandari was born in a Bengali Muslim family in the village of Maizbhandar in the Bengal Presidency's District of Chittagong on 14 January 1826 CE to Syed Matiullah and Syeda Khayrunnesa. He had two brothers; Syed Abdul Hamid and Syed Abdul Karim.

Ahmad began his education at the local maktab in his village and was later educated in Azimnagar under Mawlana Muhammad Shafi. In 1844, he enrolled at the Aliah Madrasa in Calcutta where he studied tafsir, hadith, Islamic jurisprudence and philosophy. During this time, he stayed and studied at the residence of Sufi Nur Muhammad until 1851. He also studied under Syed Abu Shahma Muhammad Salih Qadri Lahori as well as Abu Shahma's celibate elder brother Dilwar Ali Pakbaz Lahori.

== Personal life ==
In 1859, Ahmad Ullah's mother married him with Syeda Alfunnesa who was the daughter of Afaz ad-Din, the Munshi of Azimnagar. Alfunnesa died six months later, and Ahmad Ullah's mother then got him married to his sister-in-law Syeda Lutfunnesa in the same year. They had three daughters and a son. The daughters all died at a young age and his son, Syed Fayzul Haque, predeceased his father though leaving behind two sons - Syed Dilwar Husayn and Syed Mir Hasan.

== Career ==
After completing his studies, Ahmad Ullah worked as a Qadi at a Sessions Court in Jessore. A year later, he resigned and began teaching at the Religious College of Munshi Boali in Calcutta and later the Aliah Madrasa.

From 1859 onwards, Ahmad Ullah busied himself with delivering sermons, attending mehfils and being invited to the homes of his followers. He told his brothers to take care of his property, whilst he founded the Tariqa-e-Maizbhandaria, or the Maizbhandari Sufi order. The order was influenced by the Chishti Order.

== Tariqah-e-Maizbhandaria ==
An August 2008 research report by the Migration Review Tribunal (MRT) and Refugee Review Tribunal (RRT) of Australia reported that the Sufi order of Maizbhandaria had over ten million followers. Syed Emdadul Hoque Maizbhandari is the order's current leader.

According to German scholar Hans Harder, the order based in Maizbhandar "is a powerful religious institution whose very popularity and influence defy any notions of marginality. It has been able to draw adherents from all sections of society, including the urban middle class, and have managed to assert their perspective on Islam vis-à-vis pressure from reformist quarters while keeping in touch with the religious mainstream in Bengal". In terms of literature, there has been "a sizeable textual output from within the movement since the beginning of the twentieth century, including hagiographies and theological treaties, in the form of monographs, leaflets and journals".

The order is known for its gatherings for spiritual listening and devotional music, which are important in Bengali Sufi traditions. There are over 10,000 such songs, transmitted orally at first but now on CD and video, and they have come to form their own distinct genre of music in Bangladesh.
