= AKM Shamsul Huda =

Bangladeshi politician

Member of Bangladesh Parliament

Personal details
- Political party: Jatiya Party

AKM Shamsul Huda is a Jatiya Party politician, lawyer and a former member of parliament for Chittagong-3.

== Career ==
Huda was elected to parliament from Chittagong-3 as a Jatiya Party candidate in 1986 and 1988.
