= Veli =

Veli may refer to:

== People ==
=== Given name ===
- Veli Acar (born 1981), Turkish footballer
- Veli-Matti Ahonen, Finnish ski jumper
- Veli Kavlak (born 1988), Austrian footballer
- Veli-Pekka Ketola (born 1948), Finnish ice hockey player
- Veli Kızılkaya (born 1985), Turkish footballer
- Veli Koota (born 1957), Finnish boxer
- Veli Lampi (born 1984), Finnish footballer
- Veli Lehtelä (1935–2020), Finnish rower
- Veli-Matti Lindström (born 1983), Finnish ski jumper
- Veli Merikoski (1905–1982), Finnish politician and professor
- Veli Nieminen (1886–1936), Finnish gymnast and sports shooter
- Veli Paloheimo (born 1967), Finnish tennis player
- Veli Saarinen (1902–1969), Finnish cross-country skier

=== Surname ===
- Apolonia Dorregaray Veli (1914-2002), Peruvian artist, maker of mate burilado
- Gursel Veli (born 1982), Turkish-Bulgarian footballer
- Hacı Bayram-ı Veli (1352–1430), Turkish poet, founder of the Bayrami Sufi sect
- Haji Bektash Veli, Sufi mystic
- Orhan Veli (1914–1950), Turkish poet
- Bayezid II (Sultân Bayezid-î Velî) was the oldest son and successor of Mehmed II

=== Mythologic people ===
- Veļi, dead-soul spirits in Latvian mythology

== Places ==
- Veli (Gagra District), a village in Abkhazia, Georgia
- Veli, a short name for the Croatian village Veli Lošinj
- Veli, or Veligegh, a former name of the Armenian town Tsaghkavan, Tavush

== Other uses ==
- Veli (film), a 1985 Indian Tamil film
- Veli Railway Station, Trivandrum, Kerala, India

== See also ==
- Wali (disambiguation)
- Auliya (disambiguation)
