= Wali (given name) =

Wali is a masculine given name of Arabic origin. Notable people with the name include:

== Given name ==
- Wali Ahmad (died 1938), Pakistani religious cleric
- Wali Ahmed (died 1994), Bangladeshi politician
- Wali Khan Babar (1982–2011), Pakistani journalist
- Wali Bahadur (born 1990), Afghan cricketer
- Wali Dewane (1826–1881), Kurdish poet
- Wali Faisal (born 1985), Bangladeshi footballer
- Wali Gandhi (1904–1978), Bangladeshi journalist, writer, and political activist
- Wali al-Din al-'Iraqi (1361–1423), Egyptian Islamic scholar
- Wali Jones (born 1942), American basketball player
- Wali Khan, multiple people
- Wali Kirani, Afghan Muslim saint
- Wali Lundy (born 1983), American football player
- Wali Mohammed, multiple people
- Wali Rainer (born 1977), American football player
- Wali Rahmani (1943–2021), Indian Islamic scholar
- Wali Rahmani (influencer) (born 1998), Indian Muslim influencer
- Wali Rainer (born 1977), American football player
- Wali Razaqi (born 1979), Afghan producer, actor, and motivational speaker
- Wali Shah (born 1994), Canadian speaker
- Wali Hasan Tonki (1924–1995), Pakistani Islamic scholar
- Wali-ur-Rahman (1916–2006), Bangladeshi Islamic scholar

== See also ==
- Wally (given name)
- Wali (surname)
