= Tsaghkavan, Tavush =

Tsaghkavan, Tavush refer to 2 places:

- Verin Tsaghkavan, Tavush Province, Armenia
- Nerkin Tsaghkavan, Tavush Province, Armenia
