= Tsaghkavan =

Tsaghkavan may refer to these two places in the Tavush Province:

- Tsaghkavan, Armenia
- Verin Tsaghkavan, Armenia
