= Aulia =

Aulia may refer to:

- Aulia (Bithynia), a town of ancient Bithynia
- Aulia gens, a Roman family
- Wali, Islamic saints

People

- Aulia Hidayat (born 1999), Indonesian footballer
- Aulia Rahman Basri (born 1985), an Indonesian politician who currently serves as the incumbent Regent of Kutai Kartanegara Regency, East Kalimantan
- Medina Warda Aulia (born 1997), Indonesian chess player
- Nizam Uddin Aulia (1238–1325), Indian Sunni Muslim scholar and Sufi saint
- Shah Qabool Aulia (1689–1767), Moroccan Muslim Sufi Pir
- Shandy Aulia (born 1987), Indonesian actress and model
- Shella Devi Aulia (born 1994), Indonesian badminton player

== See also ==
- Auliya (disambiguation)
- Bara Aulia Degree College, Bangladesh
- Jebel Aulia, a village in Sudan
- Jebel Aulia Dam near Khartoum, Sudan
