= DFW =

DFW or D/FW may refer to:

== Businesses ==
- Deutsche Flugzeug-Werke, an early twentieth century German aircraft manufacturer
- Dutch FilmWorks, a film distributor
- Duty Free World, a US-based in-flight shopping company

== Government agencies ==
- Division of Fisheries and Wildlife (Massachusetts)
- Kentucky Department of Fish and Wildlife Resources
- Oregon Department of Fish and Wildlife

== Other uses ==
- Cosworth DFW, an automobile racing engine
- Dallas–Fort Worth metroplex, in north Texas, United States
  - Dallas Fort Worth International Airport, IATA airport code and FAA location identifier
- David Foster Wallace (1962–2008), American novelist
- Deborah Frances-White (b. 1967), Australian-British comedian, author and screenwriter
- "DFW" (Brooklyn Nine-Nine), a television episode
- Dhaka Fashion Week, a clothing festival in Bangladesh
- Diffusion welding
