= Baghnarhesi =

Mountain in Abkhazia, Georgia

- Location within Georgia Location within Abkhazia

Highest point
- Elevation: 1,442 m (4,731 ft)
- Coordinates: 43°27′46.4″N 40°10′2.5″E

Naming
- English translation: The village Baghnari HPP
- Language of name: Georgian

Geography
- Location: Georgia (Abkhazia (Note: The political status of Abkhazia is disputed. Having unilaterally declared independence from Georgia in 1992, Abkhazia is formally recognised as an independent state by 4 UN member states (three other states previously recognised it but then withdrew their recognition), while the remainder of the international community recognizes it as de jure Georgian territory. Georgia continues to claim the area as its own territory, designating it as Russian-occupied territory.))
- Parent range: Gagra

Baghnarhesi (Georgian: ბაღნარჰესი) is a 1,442-metre-high (4,731 ft) mountain of the Gagra Range in Abkhazia, Georgia.
