= Wali (disambiguation) =

Wali is an Arabic word meaning guardian, custodian, protector, or helper.

Wali or WALI may also refer to:

- Wali (Islamic legal guardian)
- Al-Walī (Arabic:الولي) and Al-Wālī (Arabic:الوالي), are two related names of God in Islam
- Wāli, an administrative title used by the Arabic and Ottoman Caliphates
- Wali, weli, wely or welli, a synonym for a Muslim maqam (shrine), used in Palestine and in older Western scholarly literature
- Wali language (Sudan), a Nubian language
- Wali language (Ghana), a Gur language
- Wali (band), an Indonesian band
- Wali, Mauritania, an alternate spelling of Waly Diantang, a village in the Gorgol Region
- WALI, a radio station (1280 AM) licensed to serve Dayton, Tennessee, United States
- WOEZ (FM), a radio station (93.7 FM) licensed to serve Burton, South Carolina, United States, which used the call sign WALI from 1996 to 2017
- Wali (game), two-player abstract strategy game

== People ==
- Wali Muhammad Wali
- Wali (sniper), Canadian sniper
- Wali (given name)
- Wali (surname)

== See also ==
- Vali (disambiguation)
- Auliya (disambiguation), plural of Wali
