= Kldekari =

Kldekari can mean:

- Kldekari (duchy), a duchy in Georgia in 876-1103
- Kldekari (mountain), a mountain in Georgia
- Kldekari (village), a village in Georgia
