= Shimul Khaled =

Bangladeshi Fashion Designer (1963–2020)

- শিমুল খালেদ
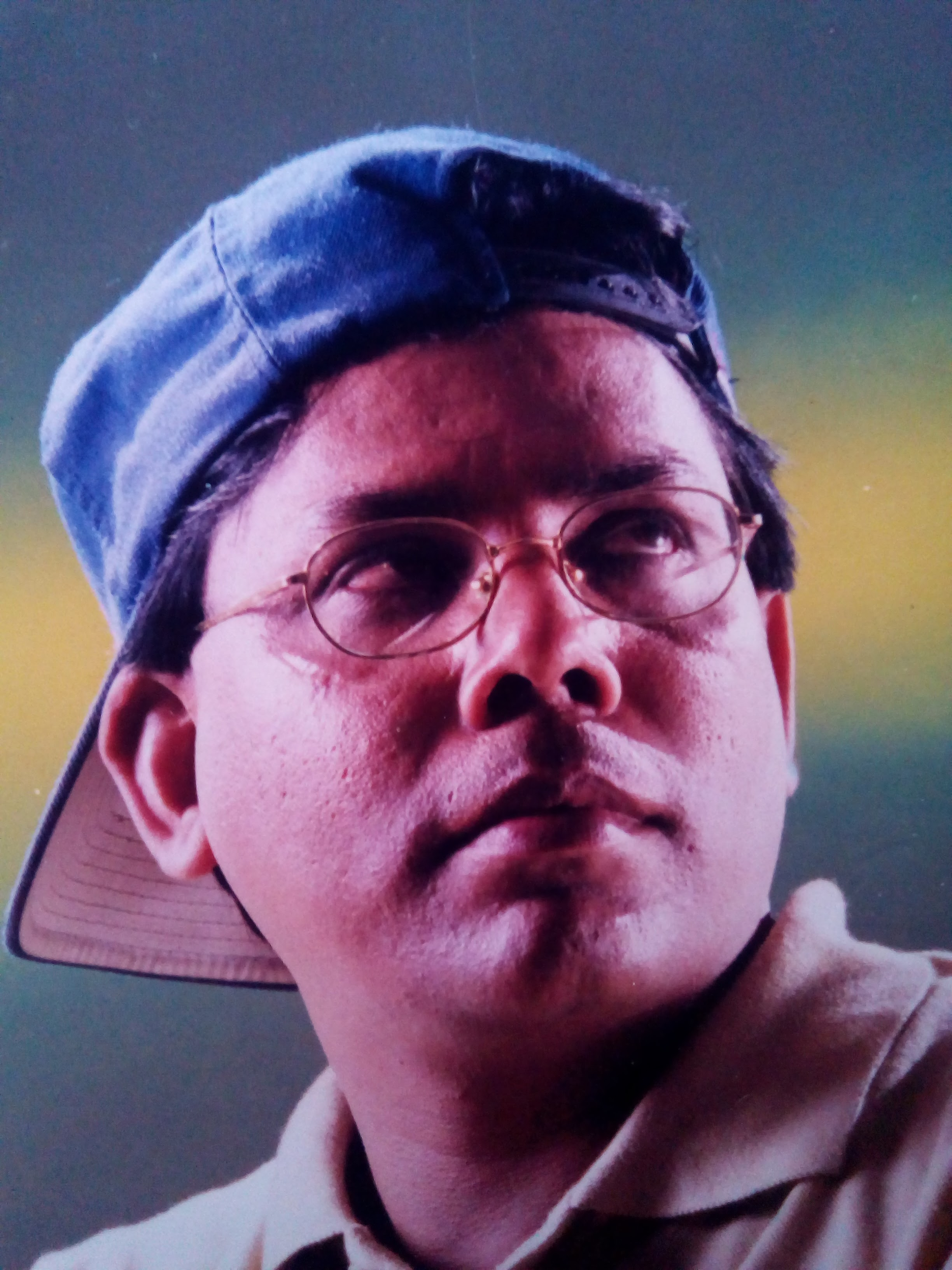
- Shimul Khaled in 2007
- Born: Forhad Bin Khaled; 30 May 1963; Chittagong, East Pakistan
- Died: 20 December 2020 (aged 57); Chittagong, Bangladesh
- Education: Institute of Fine Arts, University of Chittagong (dropped out)
- Occupation: fashion designer
- Years active: 1989-2020
- Spouse: Nahid Sultana (m. 1992)
- Children: 2
- Father: Khaled Belal
- Relatives: Wali Gandhi (granduncle)
- Shimul Khaled's voice
- Website: https://shimulkhaled.neocities.org/

Signature
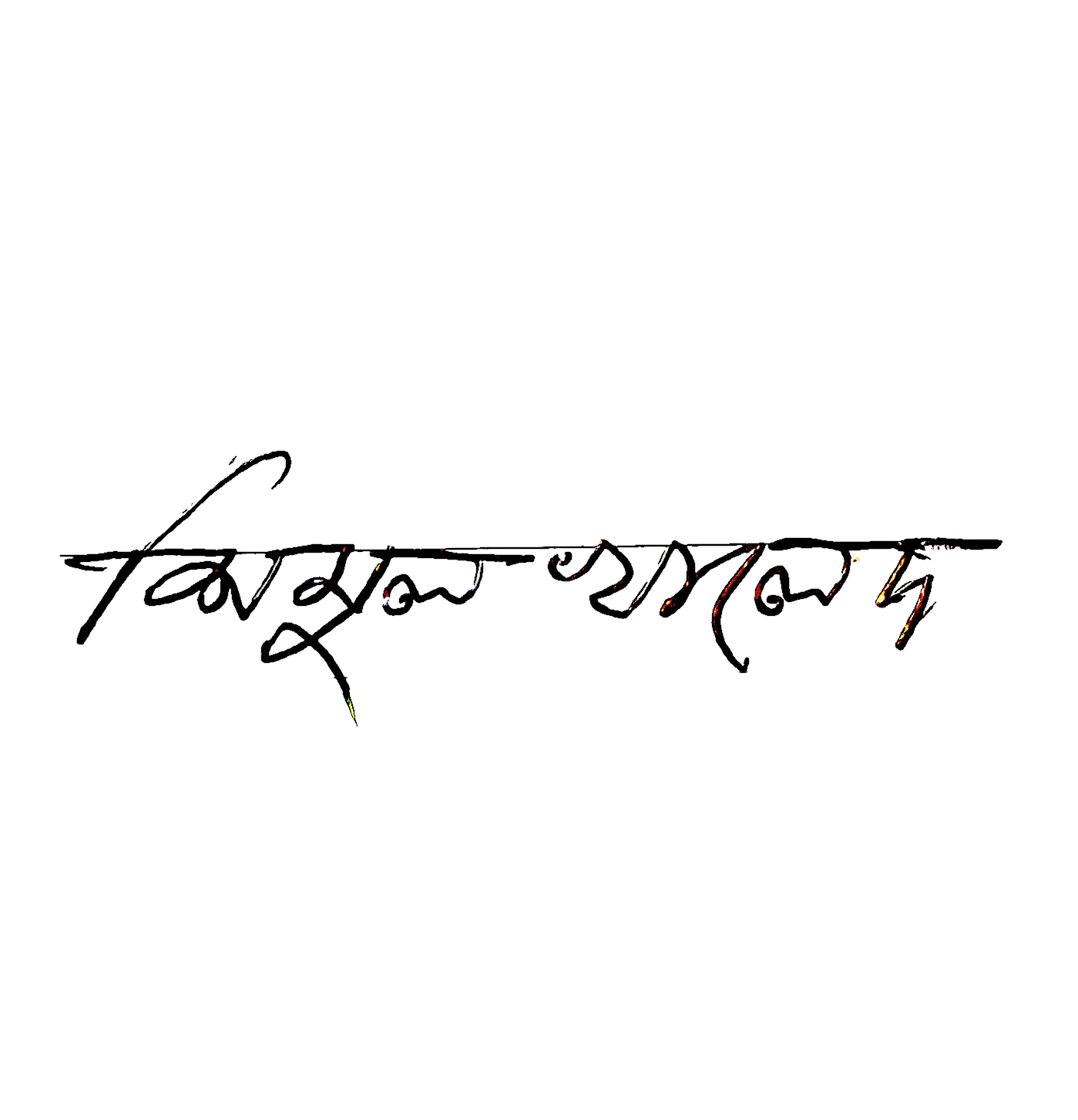

Forhad Bin Khaled (30 May 1963 – 20 December 2020), known professionally as Shimul Khaled (Bengali: শিমুল খালেদ) was a Bangladeshi fashion designer. He has been selling clothing that he has designed under the "Charu Chattogram" label since 1989. A prolific fashion creator, Khaled has worked as a fashion designer for famous models, including the popular movie stars Ferdous, Moushumi, Shakib Khan, Jaya Ahsan, and various other famous brands. He has won numerous awards for his outstanding achievements. He was working as the director of an upcoming Bengali film called 'Chattola Express'.

== Early life ==
Shimul Khaled was born on 30 May 1963 in Chittagong, East Pakistan to eminent journalist and writer Khaled Belal and Bedoura Begum.

== Career ==
Khaled is credited with starting the fashion show trend in Chittagong and has put on numerous fashion shows around Bangladesh including Dhaka Fashion Week. He also served as a judge for numerous fashion events in Bangladesh.

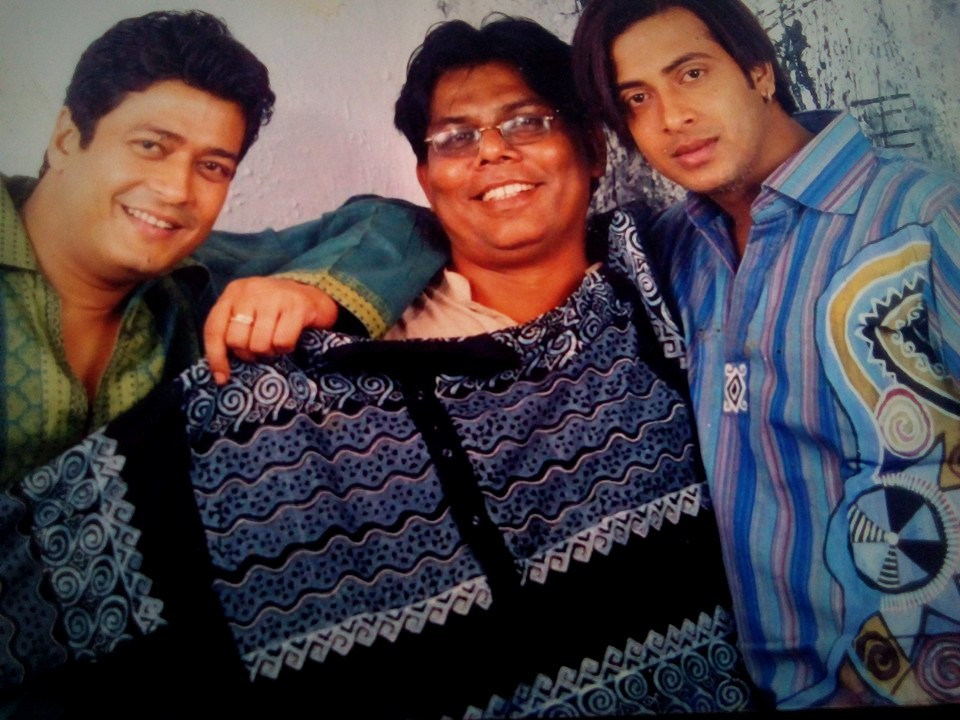
Shimul khaled with Shakib khan(right) & Ferdous Ahmed (left)

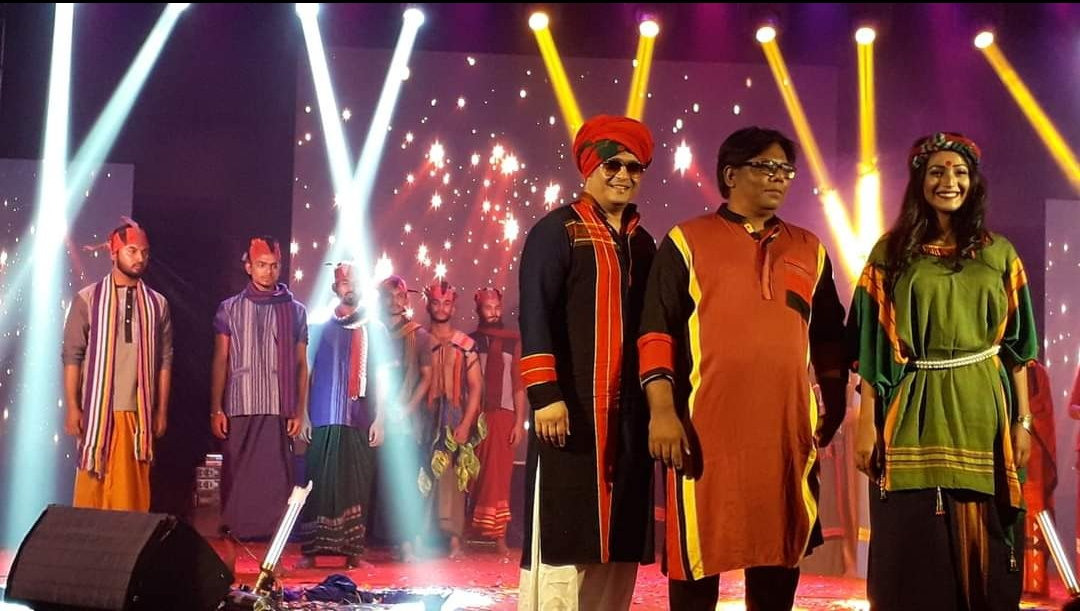
Khaled at Wasa Night 2019

== Store ==
Shimul Khaled founded a fashion brand named Charu Chattogram in 1989, which is one of the oldest fashion brands in Bangladesh. He did a number of fashion shows under the Charu Chattogram label all over Bangladesh. Charu Chattogram has a store in Chittagong.

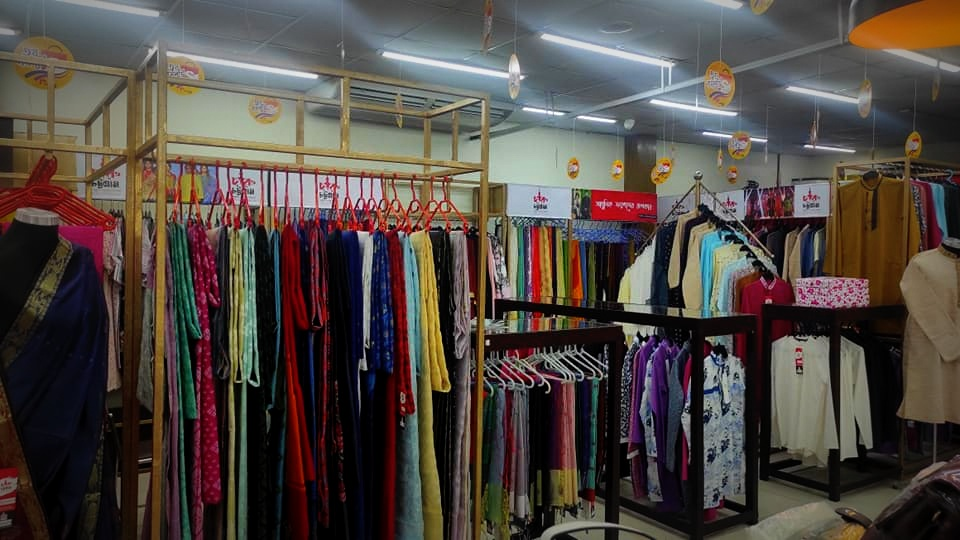

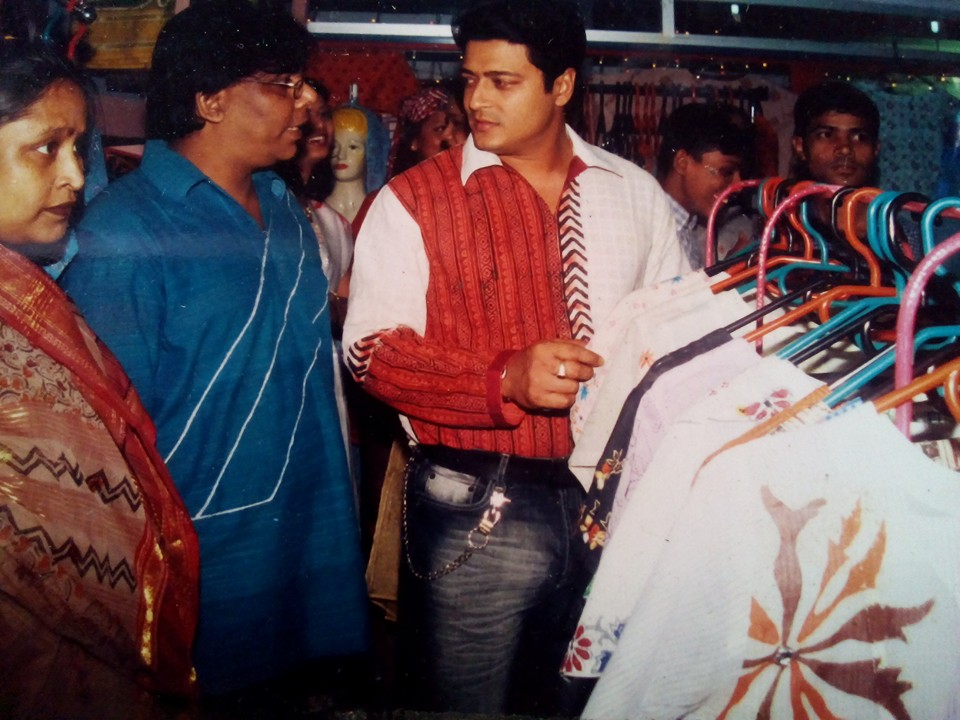
Store of Charu Chattogram in 2022 & 2000

== Filmography ==
- Ek Cup Cha (2014)
- Khairun sundari (2004)
- Praner manush (2003)

== Death ==
On 1 October 2020, he was admitted to a private hospital in Chittagong with a diagnosis of perforated ulcer. His condition subsequently worsened, necessitating his transfer to the Intensive Care Unit (ICU) where he received treatment for two weeks. Khaled died at 6:00 AM BST on 20 December 2020, at the age of 57, from septic shock followed by cardiac arrest.He was buried in Graribullah Shah's Mazaar & Mosque in Chittagong.
