= Dhaka Fashion Week =

Annual fashion event in Bangladesh

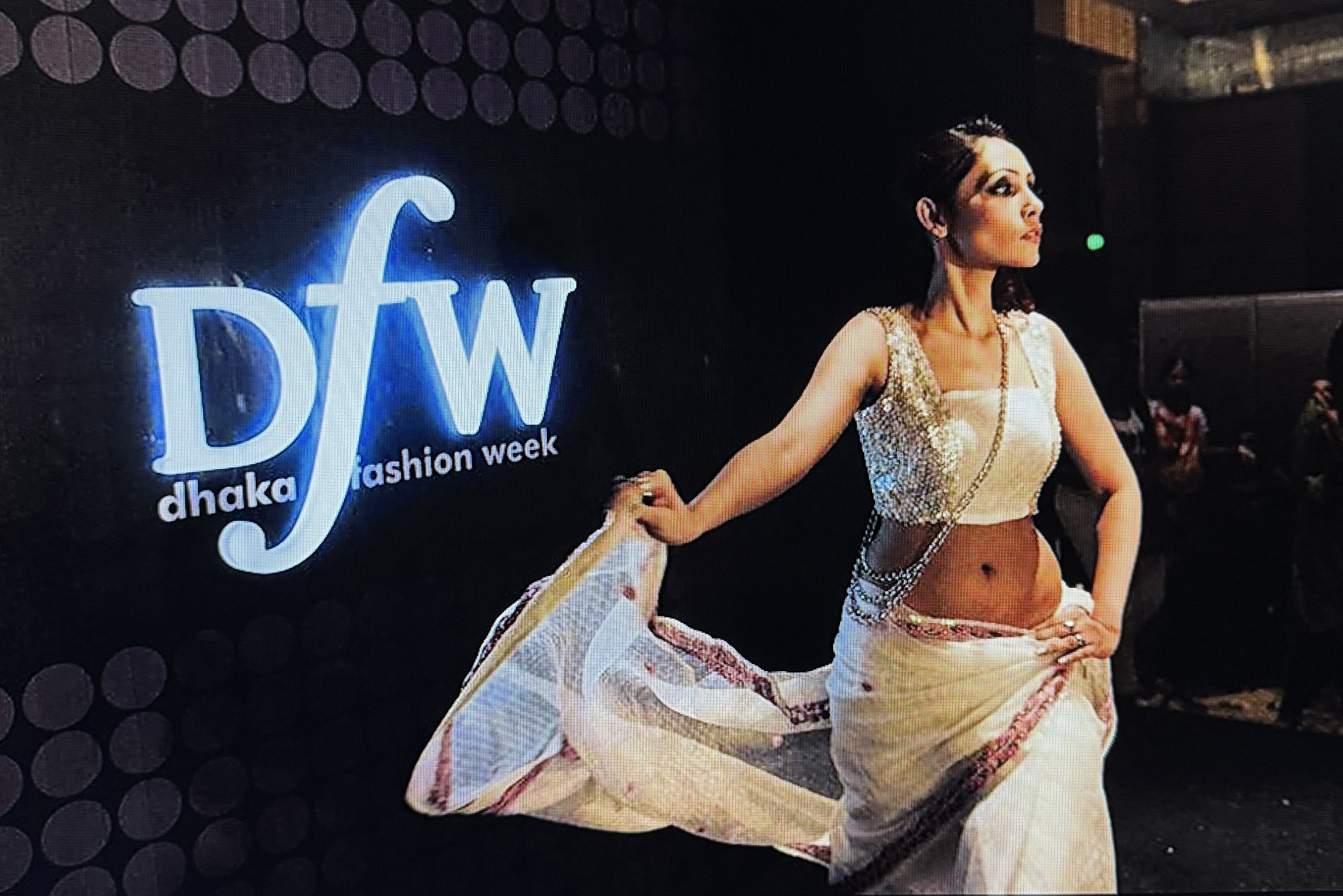
- A model catwalks during Dhaka Fashion Week, 2011
- Industry: Fashion
- Founded: Dhaka, Bangladesh
- Key people: Kawshiki Nasser and Fakhrul Alam
- Products: Clothing
- Website: www.dhakafashionwk.com

Dhaka Fashion Week is an annual fashion parade event held in Dhaka.

== History ==
Dhaka Fashion Week (DFW), has become one of the most talked about event of the capital city these days, and is drawing lot of attention from fashionistas. It has helped to create necessary exposure for some of the fashion powerhouses of Dhaka city, and to create a global profile for Dhaka as a fashion capital. It has received wide coverage from many news dailies, namely The Times of India, and Dawn of Pakistan.

=== 2008 ===
The Marico sponsored 'Aromatic Gold Dhaka Fashion Week 2008' was a 7-day fashion fiesta, which celebrated 400 years of the city of Dhaka. For this, four themes were chalked out: 'Architecture of Dhaka','Fusion City', 'Natural Environment of the City' and 'Evolution of Urban Youth'.

=== 2009 ===
DFW 2009 was organized by Tupa And Associates and hosted by Dhaka Club Between June 24 and June 26, 2009. Moon's Boutique was the title sponsor and Parachute advanced and Pride Group were the co-sponsors. Trends/ New Age, IcE today, Ekushey TV were the media and persona was

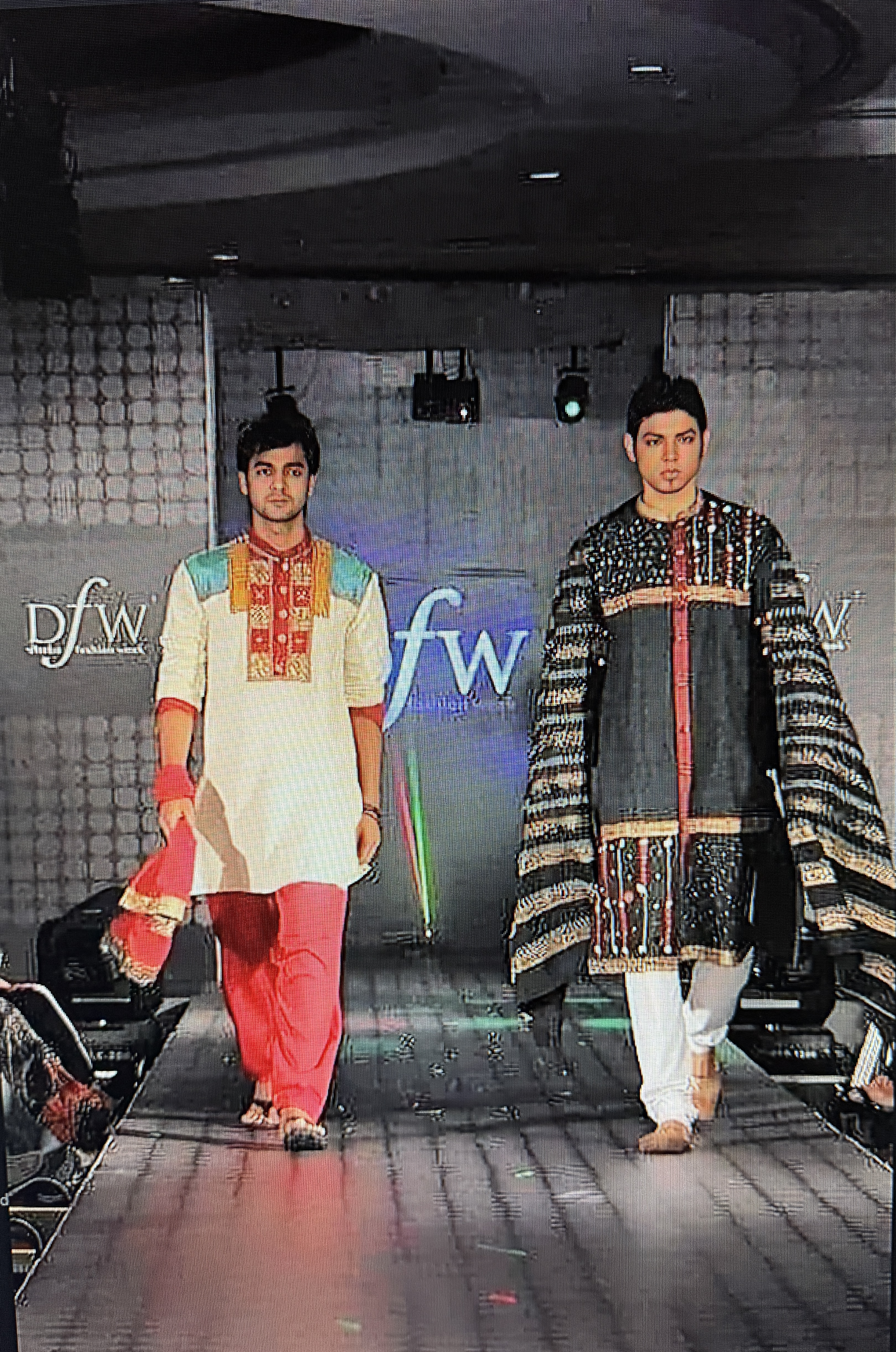
Models walks the runway modeling fashions by designer Shimul Khaled at Dhaka Fashion Week 2012.

the make over partners. Bengal Music was music partner and Kawshiki Tupa Nasser directed and choreographed all the 15 fashion Shows except the one by Emdad haque.
