= Auliya =

In the Arabic language Auliya is the plural of Wali, which means protectors, and may refer to:

- Madinat-ul-Auliya, Multan, "the city of the saints"
- Nizamuddin Auliya, Sunni Muslim scholar, Sufi saint of the Chishti Order
- Qalandar Baba Auliya, Sufi mystic
- The Auliyas, a people within the Uchhala peoples

== See also ==
- Wali (disambiguation)
- Aulia (disambiguation)
