= Khaled Belal =

Bangladeshi journalist (1938–2023)

- খালেদ বেলাল
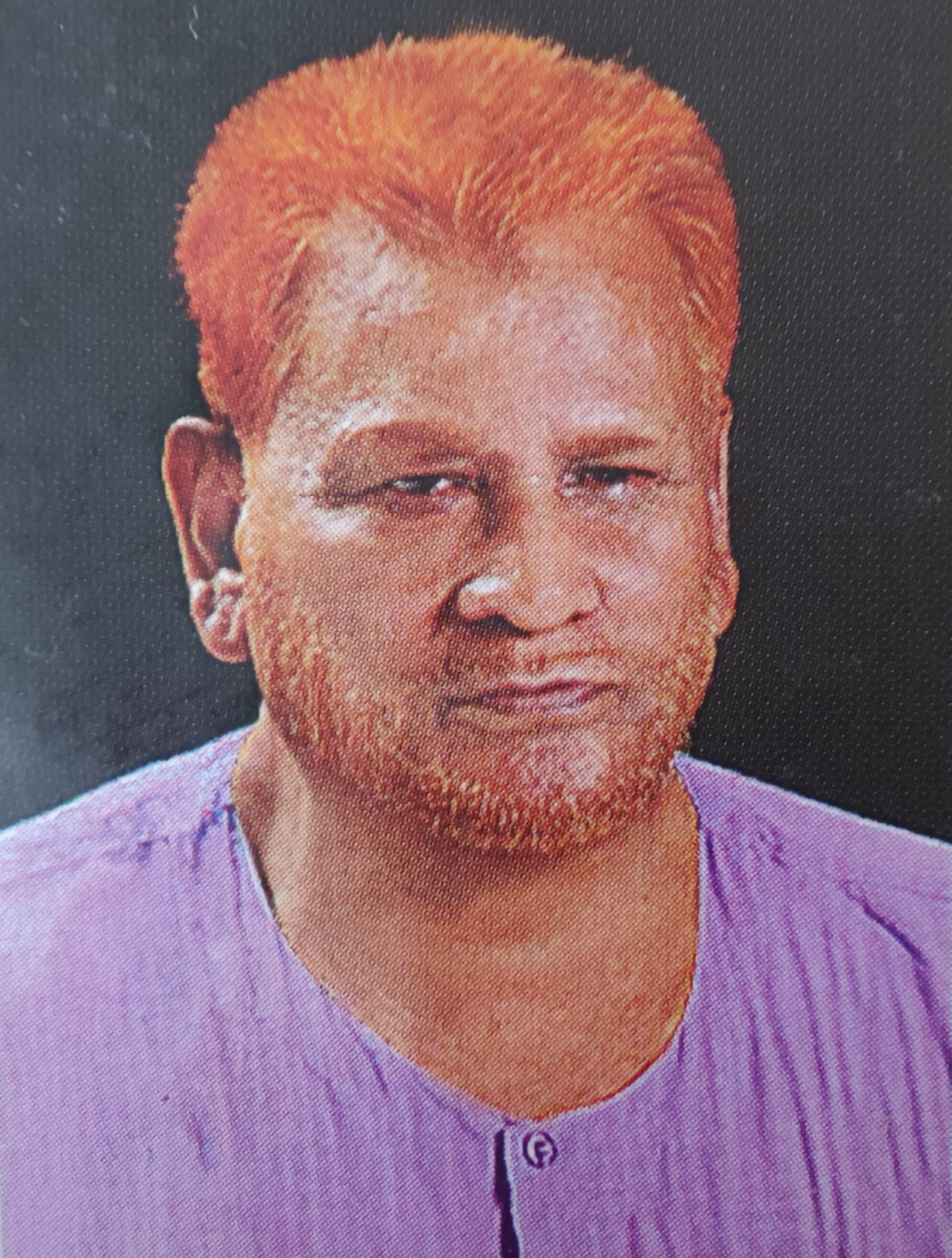
- Belal in 2007 in Chittagong
- Born: 1 January 1938; Sandwip, Bangladesh
- Died: 30 October 2023 (aged 85); Chittagong, Bangladesh
- Resting place: Garibullah Shah Mazar Graveyard
- Education: Jagannath University
- Occupation: Journalist
- Spouse: Bedoura Begum (m. 1956)
- Children: 4 (including Shimul Khaled)
- Relatives: Wali Gandhi; Zafrullah Chowdhury

Khaled Belal (1 January 1938 – 30 October 2023) was a Bangladeshi storyteller and journalist and former deputy chief information officer at the Press Information Department (PID). He is the father of popular Bangladeshi fashion designer Shimul Khaled.

== Early life and education ==
Belal was born on 1 January 1938, in Wali Gandhi's house near Bauria Moulvi Bazar in Sandwip Upazila, Chittagong. Journalist and political activist Wali Gandhi was his paternal uncle who inspired him to be a journalist.

He studied at Nawabpur Government High School and St. Gregory's College (now Notre Dame College) in the capital. After that, he studied teacher training at Jagannath College, which was later converted into Jagannath University. He has BA and BEd degrees.

== Career ==
Khaled Belal was the assistant editor of the Dainik Ishan newspaper. He was also a journalist, a former information officer, and a prominent storyteller. Moreover, he worked with the composer of the song "Amar Bhai Ar Rokte Rangano Ekushe February", Abdul Ghaffar Chowdhury, in the newspaper Awaz. In 1952, he took an active role in the language movement and worked as a columnist. At the beginning of his career, he worked in Dhaka's Dainik Paygam and in Chittagong's regional Dainik Purbadesh.

Then he joined the Bangladesh Civil Service in 1962. As BCS information officer, he served as Chittagong divisional newspaper inspector, acting deputy chief information officer, press liaison officer in 24 Infantry Division, and head of Chittagong Press Information Department (PID). After retiring from government duties, he again joined the journalism profession. After that, he worked in the English daily The People's View and many other newspapers. He also taught as a head teacher at Chittagong's Kumira High School.

== Death ==
Belal died on 30 October 2023 in Chittagong.He was buried next to his son Shimul Khaled's grave,adjacent to Graribullah Shah's Mazaar & Mosque in Chittagong.

== Books authored/coauthored/edited ==
- Khaled Belal (1992):The Chittagong Hill Tracts: Falconry in the Hills University of California, Berkeley (Digital print version published in 2007).
- Khaled Belal (1996): Moraganye Dubsatar
- Khaled Belal (1998): Naishabde Tomar Padadhani
- Khaled Belal (2002):Sritir lash Morge
- Khaled Belal (2004):Khoma Chai Sharifar Maa
