= Wali Mohammed =

Wali Mohammed is the name of:

- Wali Mohammed (ISN 560) (born 1966), Afghan held in extrajudicial detention in the US Guantanamo Bay detention camps, Cuba
- Wali Muhammad (footballer) (died 2020), Pakistani footballer
- Wali Mohammad Itoo (died 1994), Kashmiri politician
- Wali Muhammad Noorzai, Pakistani politician
- Wali Mohammed Wali (1667–1707), classical Urdu and Persian poet of the South Asia
- Habib Wali Mohammad (1924–2014), Pakistani ghazal singer
