= Shah Qabool Aulia =

Personal life
- Born: 1689 Tangier, Morocco
- Died: 1767 (aged 77–78) Peshawar, Pakistan
- Resting place: Dabgari, Peshawar, Pakistan

Religious life
- Religion: Islam
- Sect: Sufi

Shah Qabool Aulia (1689–1767) was a Moroccan Muslim Sufi Pir who traveled through the Indian subcontinent preaching Islam.

== Early life and education ==
Born in the fort town of Teenjah in 1689 in the western calendar, Shah Qabool Aulia received early spiritual education from his father before setting out to Sindh to study spiritualism. In Karachi, he studied under Shah Inayat Shaheed for 12 years. During his studies, he was put in charge of leading the "Langar Khana" for the feeding of the poor.

== Travels through India ==
Shah Qabool traveled upwards through Multan and Kashmir, near Haripur (Hazara) in a small village called Kokalyan.

== Legacy ==
Shah Qabool died in 1767. His shrine is located in the Dabgari area of Peshawar, where he lived. It is visited daily for reciting from the Quran. In addition, there is an annual pilgrimage to the shrine on the final Thursday, Friday and Saturday of each May in celebration of Urs of Shah Qabool. The Urs celebrations include stories about the Sufi, preaching from Qur'an and Mehfil.
