= Wali Rahmani (influencer) =

Indian Beloved influencer (born 1998)

- Born: 1998 (age 27–28); Kolkata, West Bengal, India
- Education: Jamia Hamdard (LLB)
- Occupations: Political analyst; influencer; activist; lawyer
- Organization: Al Hadi Educational Trust

YouTube information
- Channel: Wali Rahmani
- Years active: 2017–present
- Subscribers: 798 thousand
- Views: 43.5 million
- Last updated: 21 October 2025

Wali Rahmani (born 1998) is an Indian Muslim influencer, political analyst, lawyer, and activist.. He has been listed among the 100 most influential Muslims in India- 2025 by Muslim Mirror.

== Early life and education ==
Wali Rahmani was born in 1998 in Kolkata. His father, Shafiuddin is a businessman who comes from Bihar.

He received his primary education at St. James' School, Kolkata. He completed the intermediate at the Genesis Global School, Noida, in 2018. He completed his law degree from Jamia Hamdard, Delhi.

== Career ==
Rahmani founded Al Hadi Educational Trust. Then, he established Umeed Academy under the trust on 1 April 2018, for disadvantaged children who have been trapped in the cycle of poverty for seven, ten, or fifteen generations.

He appealed to 2 million of India's 200 million Muslims by making a video to build a formal school building on 2 acres of land purchased for Umeed Global School in South 24 Parganas, West Bengal. He asked for donations of Rs 100 per to raise Rs 10 crore. From 15 to 20 September 2023, six crore rupees were deposited and seven crore rupees were collected. By 15 March 2024, he had made a video inspecting the newly completed building of Umeeed Global School.

== Activism ==
Rahmani participated in protests against the Citizenship Amendment Act (CAA), citing concerns about its implications for constitutional values and communal harmony.

During the COVID-19 lockdowns, he and his NGO distributed food to 10,000 families. While engaged in relief efforts, he contracted COVID-19.

== Awards and honours ==
Rahmani has received several awards for his social work, including the Young Social Hero Award at the South India NGO Conference in 2019, recognition as one of India's top 20 achievers under 20 by Mumbai Coworking, and the Shan-e-Hindustan Award from Youth Ekta Front, Delhi.

In 2024, Rahmani was listed among the 100 Most Influential Indian Muslims by Muslim Mirror and the Minorities Media Foundation for his contributions to education, social activism, and community development.
