= Pride Group =

Bangladeshi textile group

- Type: Private
- Industry: Apparel manufacturing, textiles, retail, garment export, fabric processing
- Founded: Dhaka, Bangladesh
- Founder: Al-Hajj Halimur Rahman
- Key people: Mohammad Abdul Moyeed, Mohammad Abdul Moyeen and Mohammad Abdul Momen
- Brands: Pride Limited, Urban Truth
- Subsidiaries: Pride Limited, H.R Textiles Limited, Fashion Knit Garments Limited, Dacca Textiles Limited, Pride Properties Limited
- Website: pride-grp.com

Pride Group is a vertical organisation engaged in the manufacture and export of knitwear products to the European Union, the US and Canada.

The group is also engaged in the manufacture and retail of womenswear, menswear, kidswear, home decor and other textile products through a chain of 60 retail outlets spread all over Bangladesh.

== Early years ==
In 1958, founder Halimur Rahman first established Dacca Textiles, and laid the foundation to what would eventually become Pride Limited. At the time of Dacca Textiles' inception, Rahman was employed in EPSCIC, and it is from this that he arrived at the idea of establishing a garment factory that would supply locally made saris for the women of Bangladesh.

== Board of directors ==
Mohammad Abdul Moyeed (managing director), Dr. Mohammad Abdul Moyeen (director) and Mohammad Abdul Momen (director), sons of Halimur Rahman, compose the current board of Pride Group.

== H.R. Textiles Mills Limited ==
H.R. Textiles Mills Limited is a vertical public limited company, engaged in manufacture of knitwear products. H.R. Textiles Mills is a Lycra assured factory. Zara, Bershka, New Look, Stradivarius, and El Corte Inglés are some of their clients.

Fashion Knit Garments Limited is engaged in manufacturing knitwear products, consisting of ladies' tops, sports and active wear, children's outerwear, and men's innerwear.

== Dacca Textiles Limited ==
Dacca Textiles is involved in the manufacturing and processing of woven textiles. It is one of the oldest textile processors in Bangladesh.

== Pride Limited ==
Pride Limited, in its present form, started with the setting up of a retail outlet at TMC Bhaban in 1991. Pride Limited was previously known as Pride Textiles.

=== Product range ===
Better known for its saris and other textile products, Pride Limited product lines range from Pride Signature, Pride Girls, Ethnic Menswear, Pride Kids and Pride Home Textiles.

== Urban Truth ==
Launched in 2010, Urban Truth specifically targets the younger segment of Dhaka society.

=== Product range ===
Fast fashion styles that are marketed towards millennials and Generation Z.
