= Wali Mohammed (ISN 560) =

Wali Mohammed is a citizen of Afghanistan who was held in extrajudicial detention, for over fourteen and a half years, in the United States Guantanamo Bay detention camps, in Cuba. Guantanamo counter-terrorism analysts estimate he was born on February 15, 1966, in Wazirabad, Puli Khumri District, Baghlan Province, Afghanistan.

== Official status reviews ==
Originally the Bush Presidency asserted that captives apprehended in the "war on terror" were not covered by the Geneva Conventions, and could be held indefinitely, without charge, and without an open and transparent review of the justifications for their detention. In 2004 the United States Supreme Court ruled, in Rasul v. Bush, that Guantanamo captives were entitled to being informed of the allegations justifying their detention, and were entitled to try to refute them.

=== Office for the Administrative Review of Detained Enemy Combatants ===
Combatant Status Review Tribunals were held in a 3x5 meter trailer where the captive sat with his hands and feet shackled to a bolt in the floor.

Following the Supreme Court's ruling the Department of Defense set up the Office for the Administrative Review of Detained Enemy Combatants.

Scholars at the Brookings Institution, led by Benjamin Wittes, listed the captives still held in Guantanamo in December 2008, according to whether their detention was justified by certain common allegations:

- Wali Mohammed was listed as one of the captives who "The military alleges ... fought for the Taliban."
- Wali Mohammed was listed as one of the captives who was a member of the Taliban leadership.
- Wali Mohammed was listed as one of the captives who had admitted "some form of associational conduct."

=== Ali Shah Mousouvi v. George W. Bush ===
Wali Mohammed had a habeas corpus petition (05-cv-1124) filed on his behalf, in 2005.

=== Formerly secret Joint Task Force Guantanamo assessment ===
On April 25, 2011, whistleblower organization WikiLeaks published formerly secret assessments drafted by Joint Task Force Guantanamo analysts. His 10-page Joint Task Force Guantanamo assessment was drafted on October 23, 2008. It was signed by camp commandant Rear Admiral David M. Thomas Jr. He recommended continued detention.

== Repatriation or transfer ==
Spencer Ackerman, reporting in The Guardian, wrote that the non-profit Afghanistan Analyst's Network named Mohammed as an individual whose status evaluations in Guantanamo had been characterized by "gross incompetence".

Mohammed was transferred to the United Arab Emirates on January 19, 2017, the last day of the Barack Obama Presidency.

On May 29, 2018, Missy Ryan, of The Washington Post described the conditions Mohammed and other individuals formerly held in Guantanamo experienced in their UAE rehabilitation centre. Just as at Guantanamo, Mohammed and the other men were allowed very little contact with their family. Rare phone calls could last no more than five minutes, and officials who were listening in would often terminate the calls early, without warning. Unlike Guantanamo the men were not allowed visits from their lawyers, and the centre's location was a secret. Mohammed's son Abdul Musawer told Ryan his father was "very hopeless".
