= Duty Free World =

Duty Free World Inc.
- Company type: Sole Proprietorship
- Industry: Travel retail
- Founded: April 12, 1995
- Founder: Mayra del Valle
- Headquarters: Medley, Florida, United States
- Area served: Worldwide
- Key people: Leylani Cardoso (Vice President and COO)
- Products: Duty free consumer goods
- Number of employees: 200+ (2017)
- Website: www.dfwinflight.com www.dutyfreeonboard.com

Duty Free World (DFW) was an American duty free and travel retailer headquartered in Miami, Florida, specializing in inflight duty-free sales. The company sold primarily luxury products onboard aircraft. It operated from 12 locations around the world to service traveling passengers who purchase through its airline partners, which include Aeromexico, LATAM Airlines and United Airlines, as well as online.

The company was established April 1995 by Mayra del Valle and was owned by her and Leylani Cardoso. Duty Free World was the only female-owned company in the travel-retail industry. By 2017 at its peak the company employed over 200 people around the world and processes over 1,068,545 transactions annually from traveling customers.

== History ==
=== Foundation ===
In 1995, a Cuban-American, Mayra del Valle mortgaged her home to pursue the American dream of owning a business when her employer, Inflight Duty Free Shops, of 15 years was sold to Duty Free International. DFW opened its doors having one airline contract with a Canadian charter airline, Royal Aviation. Having a small operation and limited resources, she set off to personally train flight attendants on the technique of selling inflight travel retail in seven locations throughout Canada. In 1999, her daughter, Leylani Cardoso joined the company.

=== Expansion ===
In 2001, the company's main competitor, World Duty Free, announced that it would be closing its inflight retail division, giving way for DFW's expansion. In 2002 DFW landed its first major carrier in North America, Mexicana de Aviación. Recognizing that flight attendants were the company's sales force, it launched the first ever flight attendant portal, allowing flight attendants to virtually view their sales activity from anywhere in the world. This new tool became a competitive edge. This won the company its first major US Airline contract in 2003 with US Airways and United Airlines later that same year. During this same period, the company began to see the need for specialized travel retail products; owner Leylani Cardoso launched her own line of handbags Bolzano Handbags, that “traveled well”. Today, the company designs and sells over 154,806 private label travel products annually onboard aircraft and online to traveling customers.

The company obtained its first European contract with Spain's Iberia Airlinesin 2007. In 2009 DFW went on to obtain contracts with Aeromexico, having already landed a contract with Mexicana de Aviación, this new acquisition meant it controlled all the inflight duty free in Mexico. This trend continued with the acquisition of LATAM's onboard duty free business in 2013.

In 2015 the company launched a travel retail website, www.dutyfreeonboard.com, extending the inflight duty free program further; passengers could preorder duty free products and have them delivered in the US or to their flight. This service was later expanded in 2016, allowing friends and family to surprise passengers with special gifts during their flight.

=== Decline ===
In 2017, United Airlines, closed its duty free programme and its contract with DFW after it said that it was unable to compete with airport duty free vendors that stock much more merchandise.

In 2017, the company lost its contract with LATAM, after the airline said "The supplier repeatedly did not meet LATAM’s standards regarding stock levels and other contractual obligations".

== Locations ==
Duty Free World had offices in the following locations:

=== Asia-Pacific ===
- Guam
- Guangzhou, China
- Narita, Japan

=== North America ===
- Chicago, Illinois
- Houston, Texas
- Kearny, New Jersey
- Los Angeles, California
- Mexico City, Mexico
- Miami, Florida
- San Francisco, California
- Sterling, Virginia

=== South America ===
- Asuncion, Paraguay
- Guayaquil, Ecuador
- Lima, Peru
- Rio de Janeiro, Brazil
- Santiago, Chile
- São Paulo, Brazil

== Recognition ==
In 2009 DFW won SFMSDC Supplier of The Year and its COO, Leylani Cardoso was recognized as WIPP member of the year.

In 2010 the company received an award from Duty Free News International for Best Inflight Travel Retail of the Year. In 2014 it won Duty Free News International’s The Best Inflight Travel Retailer of The Year with its airline partner Aeromexico.
