= Metroon (Bithynia) =

Town on the Black Sea coast of ancient Bithynia

Coordinates: 41°20′48″N 31°28′54″E

Metroon (Ancient Greek: Μητρῷον), also called Aulia. was a town on the Black Sea coast of ancient Bithynia, described by Arrian (Periplus of the Euxine Sea 19) as 80 stades (ca. 13 km) east of Heraclea Pontica.

Its site is located near Köseağzı in Asiatic Turkey.
