= Wali (surname) =

Wali is a Kashmiri surname. Notable people with the name include:

- Abdallah Wali, Nigerian politician
- Abdul Wali, various people
- Ahmad Wali, Afghan ghazal singer
- Amina Wali, Pakistani alpine skier
- Aminu Bashir Wali (born 1941), Nigerian politician
- Bashar Wali (born 1971), Syrian-American hotelier
- Chika Wali, Nigerian footballer
- Gulraiz Wali (born 1943), Pakistani cricketer
- Ifrah Wali (born 1995), Pakistani alpine skier
- Kameshwar C. Wali (1927–2022), Indian-American theoretical physicist
- Mohsin Wali (born 1953), Indian cardiologist
- Najem Wali (born 1956), Iraqi novelist and journalist
- Miki Wali, Fijian activist for democracy and transgender rights
- Noor Wali (born 1996), Pakistani cricketer
- Obi Wali (1932–1993), Nigerian activist and politician
- Okey Wali (born 1958), Nigerian lawyer
- Sima Wali (1951–2017), Afghan activist
- Taj Wali (born 1991), Pakistani cricketer
- Wali Mohammed Wali (1667–1707), Indian classical Urdu poet
- Yousef Wali (1930–2020), Egyptian politician

== See also ==
- Wali (given name)
