= Uchhala =

Uchhala is a very beautiful place with a small population. It is located in Soon Valley, Khushab District. The Valley is situated in north west of Khushab. The Valley starts from Padhrar Village and ends to Sakesar that is the highest peak of Salt Range.

== People ==
The main tribe of the area is the Awan of Ancient repute. This tribe came in this area with Qutab Shah and settled here. Uchhala is a home of Auliyas i.e. Sultan Haji Ahmad Sb, Baba Topi Wala. The Sub-Branches and small tribes in Uchhala are Mian tribe and Ladal tribe.

== Culture ==
Being as a tribe of Arabs origin, the local people follows Islamic culture and traditions. Traditionally the marriages are arranged according to the Islamic traditions and wedding ceremony usually takes place at the mosques. Nikah is attended by close family members, relatives, and friends of groom and bride. Usually, the men and women are made to sit separately, in different rooms, or have a purdah (curtain) separating them.

Luddi is famous folk dance on occasions of happiness. Also dhol and shehnai (pipes) and Harmuniam are famous musical instruments for celebrations.
