= Wali Ahmad =

Pakistani religious cleric and reformer

Wali Ahmad (Pashtoولي احمد), known as Sandakai (Mulla), was a religious cleric, and reformer who was influential during the formation of Swat State.

== Early life and education ==
Wali Ahmad was born at Sandakai, Currently Dandai, Besham, Swat. Born into a religious family, he was given religious education locally. He proceeded to Madrasah-i-Deoband for higher studies. He then visited Makkah for the performance of Hajj and travelled to Syria, Baghdad and other centers of Muslim civilization.

== Anti British movement ==
Wali Ahmad returned from abroad and opened a religious school (Madrasah) at Tahkal (Peshawar). In those days Haji Sahib of Turangzai was working against the British. Wali Ahmad was very much inspired by Haji Sahib. He went to Swat, in 1910, and organized the people in Swat and Kohistan against the British.

== Reformation of society ==
Wali Ahmad (Sandakai Mullah) was against the aberrations in Islamic customs and rituals prevalent in Swat. So he continued to struggle for the formation of an Islamic government in Swat. He built a force of fifty to sixty shaykhs (disciples) equipped with latest weapons and were ready for every kind of action ordered by their pir (religious leader). He established his own mobile Shari'at Court where he tried to compensate and remove the grievances of people. He declared many prevalent practices such as Qada 'Umri, Iskhat and visiting shrines of saints to be innovations in Islam.

== His role in the formation of Swat State ==
At that time, there was no government and central controlling authority in Swat. Wali Ahmad wanted a united government of Swat to eliminate the influence of the Nawab of neighboring Dir. The Khans of Swat supported him. The people of upper Swat, under the command of Sandakai Mullah, defeated the Nawab in 1914, which made the former a political leader. Sandakai Mullah was desirous f having a centralized organization Swat. Thus, Syed Abdul Jabbar Shah of Sithanah was made ruler of Swat in 1915. But he could not managed to protect Swat from the attacks of Nawab of Dir. Sandakai Mullah, who had first brought and made Abdul Jabbar Shah as king in Swat, drove him out and enthroned Miangul Abdul Wadud as the ruler of Swat, thus playing the role of king maker and king breaker.

== The fate of Sandakai Mulla ==
With the passage of time, his relations with Miangul Abdul Wadud also became strained. He, again focused his attention on the eradication of innovations and un-Islamic rituals. He re-established his mobile Shari'at Court and executed his orders. The Badshah Sahib considered his presence and influence as serious threat to his power. So he wanted to reduce and diminish his role and influence. Miangul Abdul Wadud sent him his men and threatened him to leave Swat or he will be killed. The Badsha had now become so strong that nobody could challenge him. So, ultimately Sandakai Mullah left Swat in 1920 and settled in Kohan, Dir, where he died a natural death in 1356 A.H. (1937/1938 AD)

== See also ==
- Swat (princely state)
- Fazlullah (militant leader)
- Swat District
