= Wali Gandhi =

Bangladeshi journalist (1904–1978)

- ওয়ালি গান্ধী
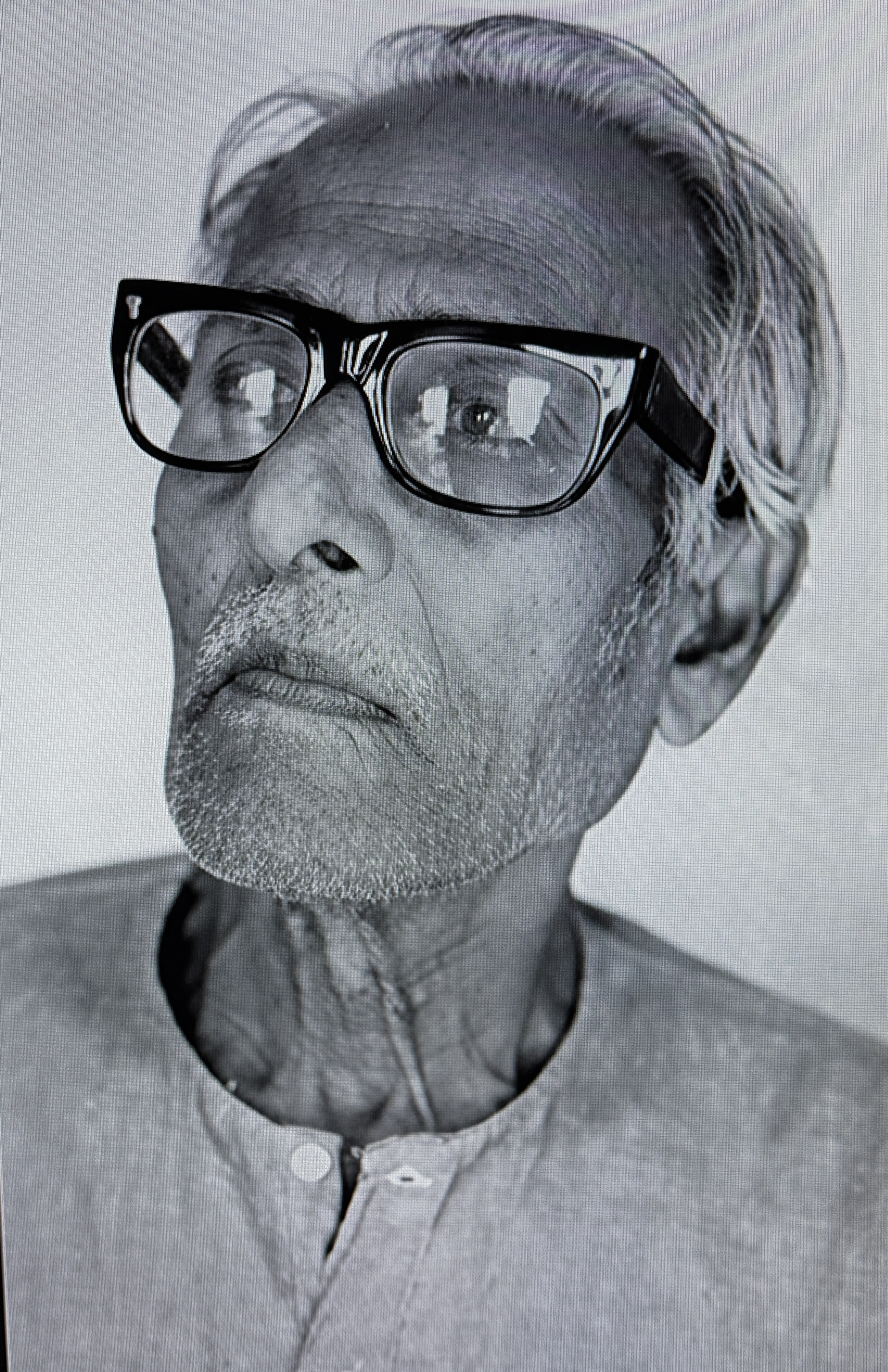
- Born: Mohammad Waliullah; 15 November 1904; Sandwip, Eastern Bengal and Assam, British India
- Died: 3 August 1978 (aged 73); Dhaka, Bangladesh
- Other name: Laalkurta
- Occupation: Journalist
- Relatives: Khaled Belal (nephew)

Mohammad Waliullah (15 November 1904–3 August 1978), more commonly known as Wali Gandhi (Bengali: ওয়ালি গান্ধী), was a Bangladeshi journalist, writer, and political activist. He was known for his involvement in the Anti-British civil disobedience movement in his early life and later for his long career in journalism and government service in East Pakistan (present-day Bangladesh).

== Early life and education ==
Mohammad Waliullah was born on 15 November 1904, in the village of Bauria, Sandwip, Eastern Bengal and Assam, British India (located in present-day Chittagong District, Bangladesh). His father, Ramiz Ali, worked in Calcutta (present-day Kolkata, India).

Waliullah completed his matriculation in 1924 from Sandwip Kargil High School and his Intermediate in Arts (IA) in 1932 from Chittagong College. He later studied English Literature at B. M. College in Barisal. Between 1933 and 1936, he was schoolteacher in his hometown.

== Political career ==
While a student, Waliullah became deeply involved in nationalist politics. He was a participant in the anti-British civil disobedience movement, which led to his arrest and charges in 1921–1922.

Initially, he was heavily influenced by the ideals of Mahatma Gandhi and joined the Indian National Congress (INC). Due to his active involvement and fiery spirit, he became widely known by the nicknames Laalkurta (meaning 'Red Coat') and Wali Gandhi. Later in his career, however, he shifted his political allegiance and became an activist for the All-India Muslim League (ML) starting in 1937.

== Journalism and services ==
Waliullah had a long and varied career in journalism, working for several newspapers across Burma, India, and what would become present-day Bangladesh. His notable associations included

- The Rangoon
- Daily News
- Star of India
- The Orient Press of India
- Dainik Azadi
- Dainik Purbadesh
- Dainik Ittehad
- Dainik Sangbad

His work as a journalist provided him with opportunities to travel extensively and meet prominent political figures of the era, including Mahatma Gandhi, Huseyn Suhrawardy, A. K. Fazlul Huq, and Abdul Hamid Khan Bhashani.

In addition to his newspaper work, Waliullah also served the government as an assistant editor in the Information Department of the United Front (UF) and subsequent governments of East Pakistan from 1954 to 1967.

== Literary works ==
Waliullah was also an author, primarily focusing on current affairs, journalism, and personal experiences. His published works include:

- Sanbad O Sanbadik (News and Journalists) (1943)
- Sekal O Ekal (Then and Now) (1952)
- Phansir Mavche (1952)
- Bichitra Jiban (Variety of Life) (1952)
- Amader Mukti Sangram (Our Freedom Struggle) (1952)
- Yuga-Bichitra (Variety of Ages) (1967) – A collection of his travel experiences.
- Bangladesher Abhyuday (The Rise of Bangladesh)
- Sanbadiker Savchay
- Yuga Bibartan O Jiban Jagar Kahini (1982)

His travelogue, Yug-Bichitra, was critically acclaimed and earned him the Dawood Prize in 1968.

== Death ==
Waliullah was admitted to Dhaka's PG Hospital on 31 July 1978, suffering from various ailments. That same night, he fell from the hospital bed and was injured. Later, he died on 3 August 1978.
