= Tsaghkavan, Armenia =

Tsaghkavan Ծաղկավան
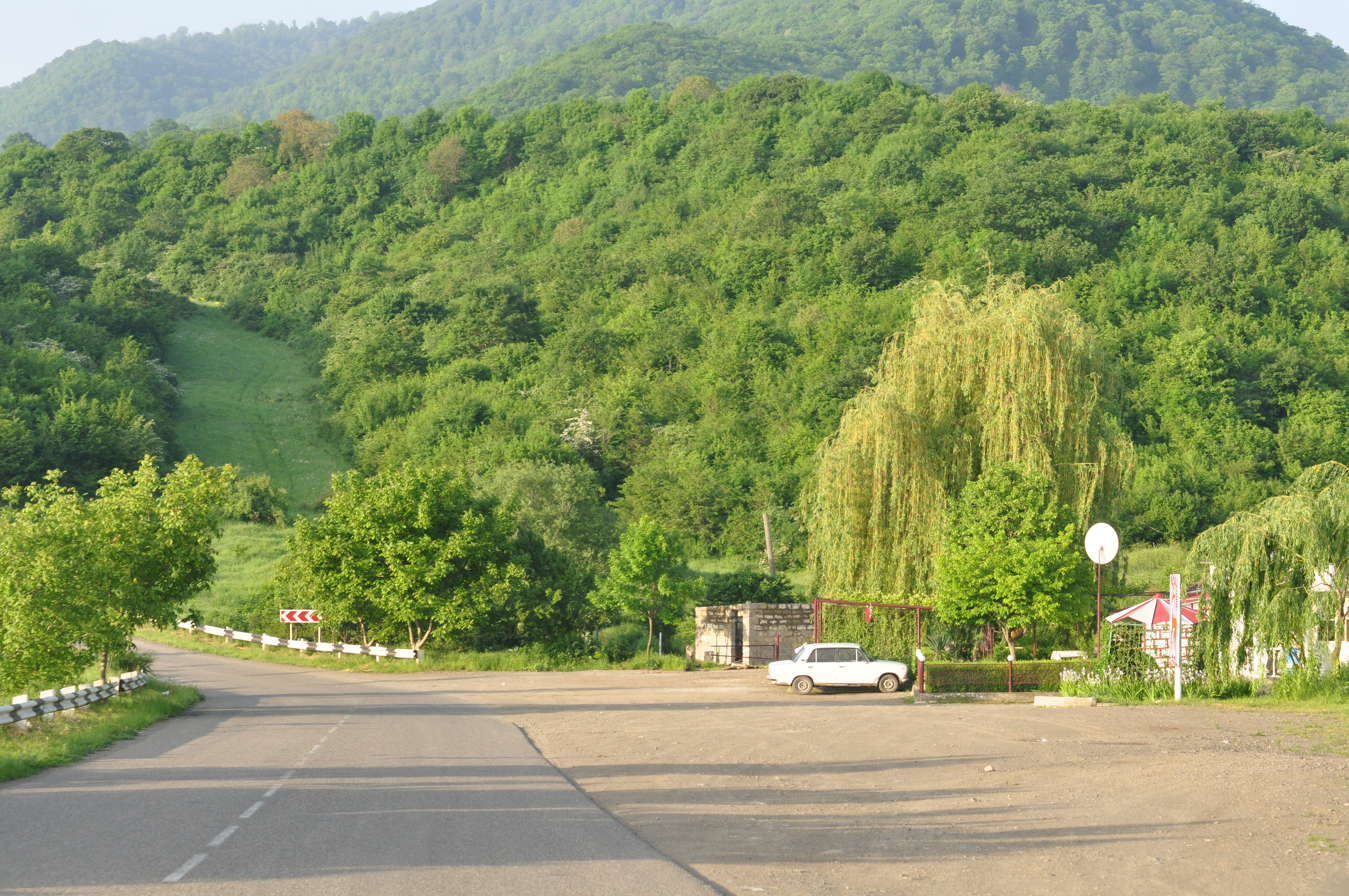
- On the road between Kirants and Nerkin Tsaghkavan

- Location within Armenia Location within Tavush
- Coordinates: 41°02′03″N 45°07′05″E
- Country: Armenia
- Province: Tavush
- Municipality: Ijevan

Population (2011)
  - Total: 532
- Time zone: UTC+4 (AMT)

Tsaghkavan (Armenian: Ծաղկավան) is a village in the Ijevan Municipality of the Tavush Province of Armenia.

== Etymology ==
The village was previously known as Melikgyugh and Melikgegh.
