= Verin Tsaghkavan =

Verin Tsaghkavan Վերին Ծաղկավան
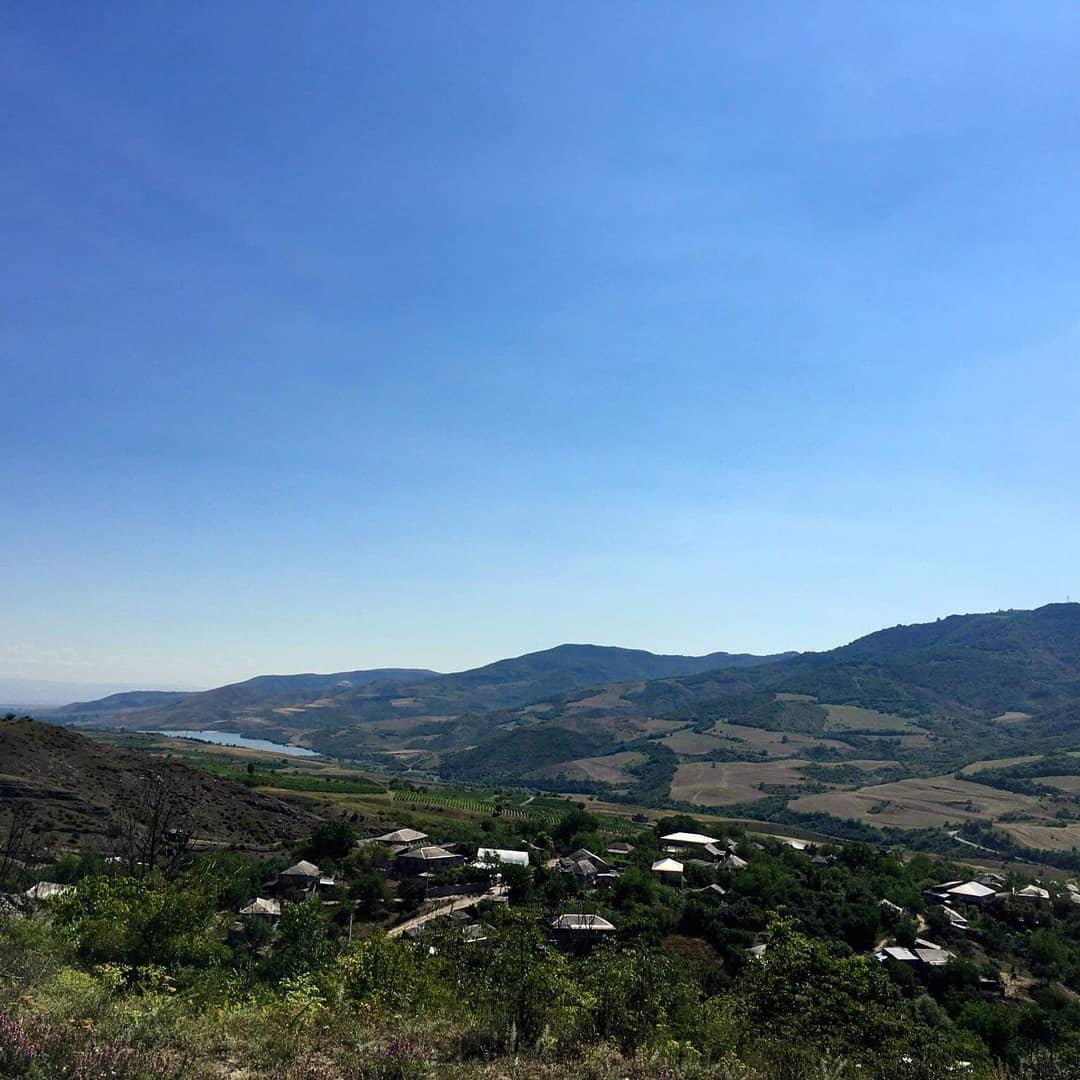
- A view of Verin Tsaghkavan

- Location within Armenia Location within Tavush
- Coordinates: 40°56′31″N 45°19′52″E
- Country: Armenia
- Province: Tavush
- Municipality: Berd

Population (2011)
  - Total: 887
- Time zone: UTC+4 (AMT)

Verin Tsaghkavan (Armenian: Վերին Ծաղկավան) is a village in the Berd Municipality of the Tavush Province of Armenia.

== Etymology ==
The village was previously known as Veligegh and Veli.

== Gallery ==
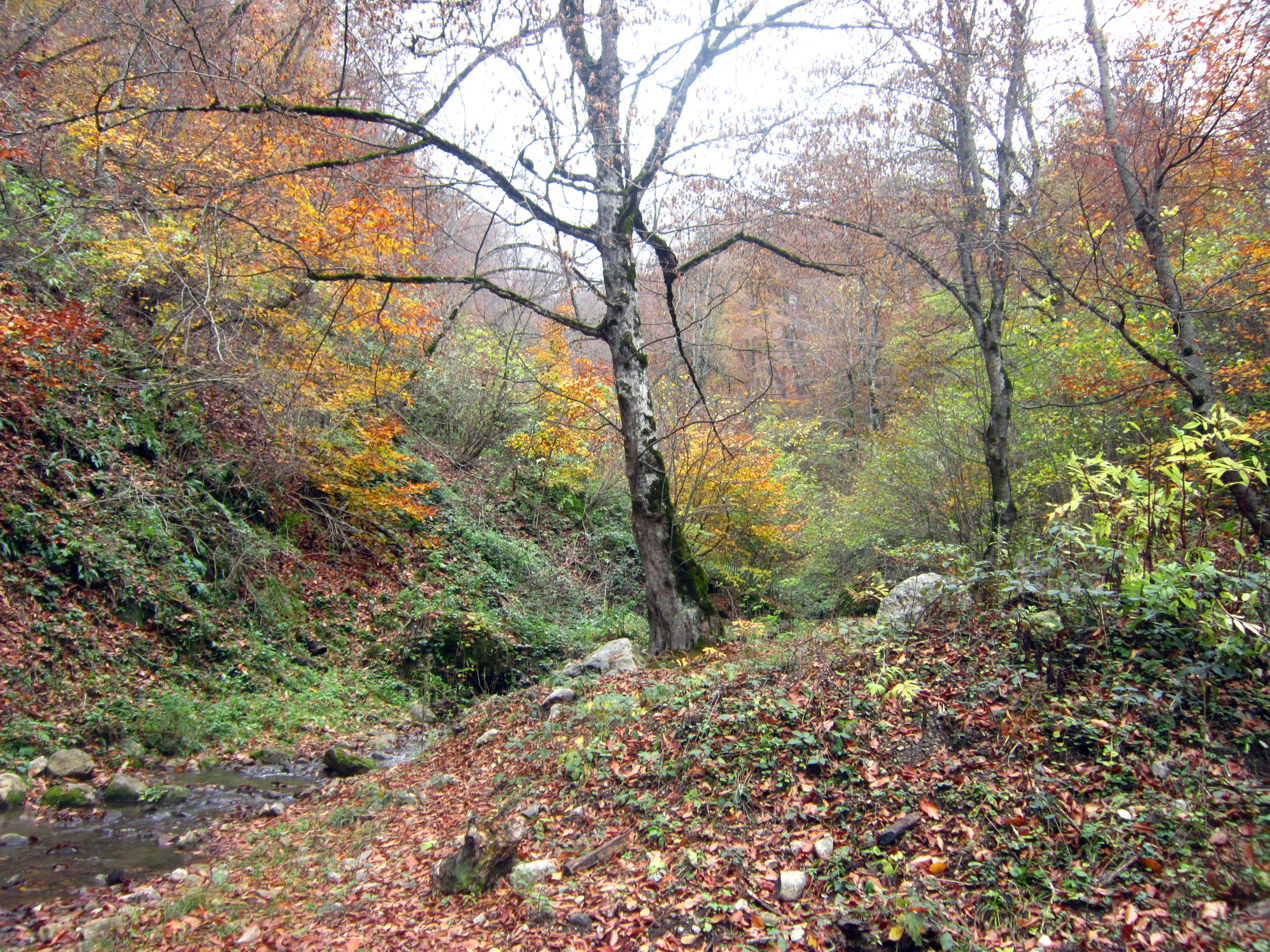
Nature on the road to the Shkhmurad Monastery

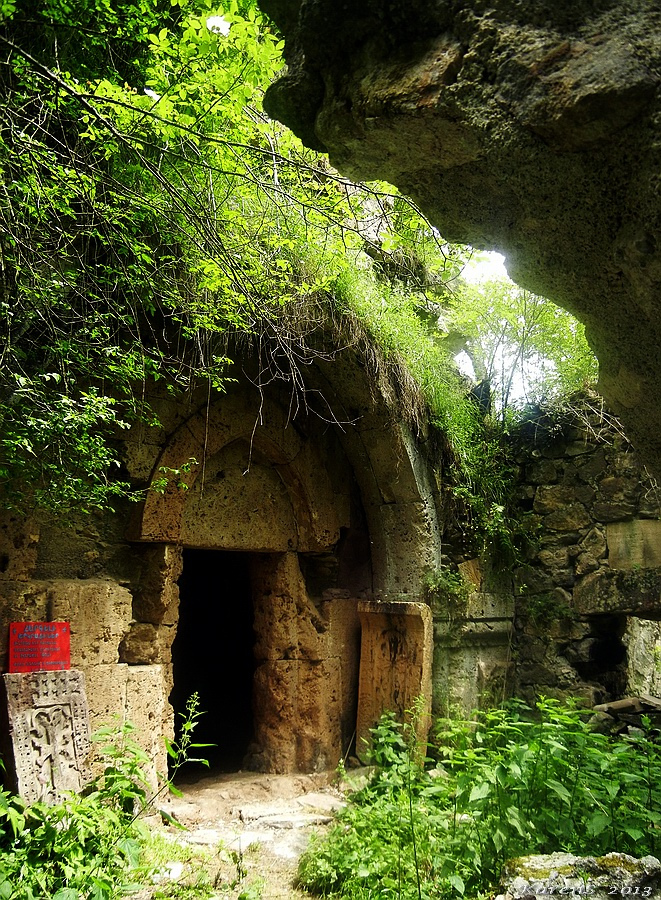
Entrance to the Shkhmurad Monastery

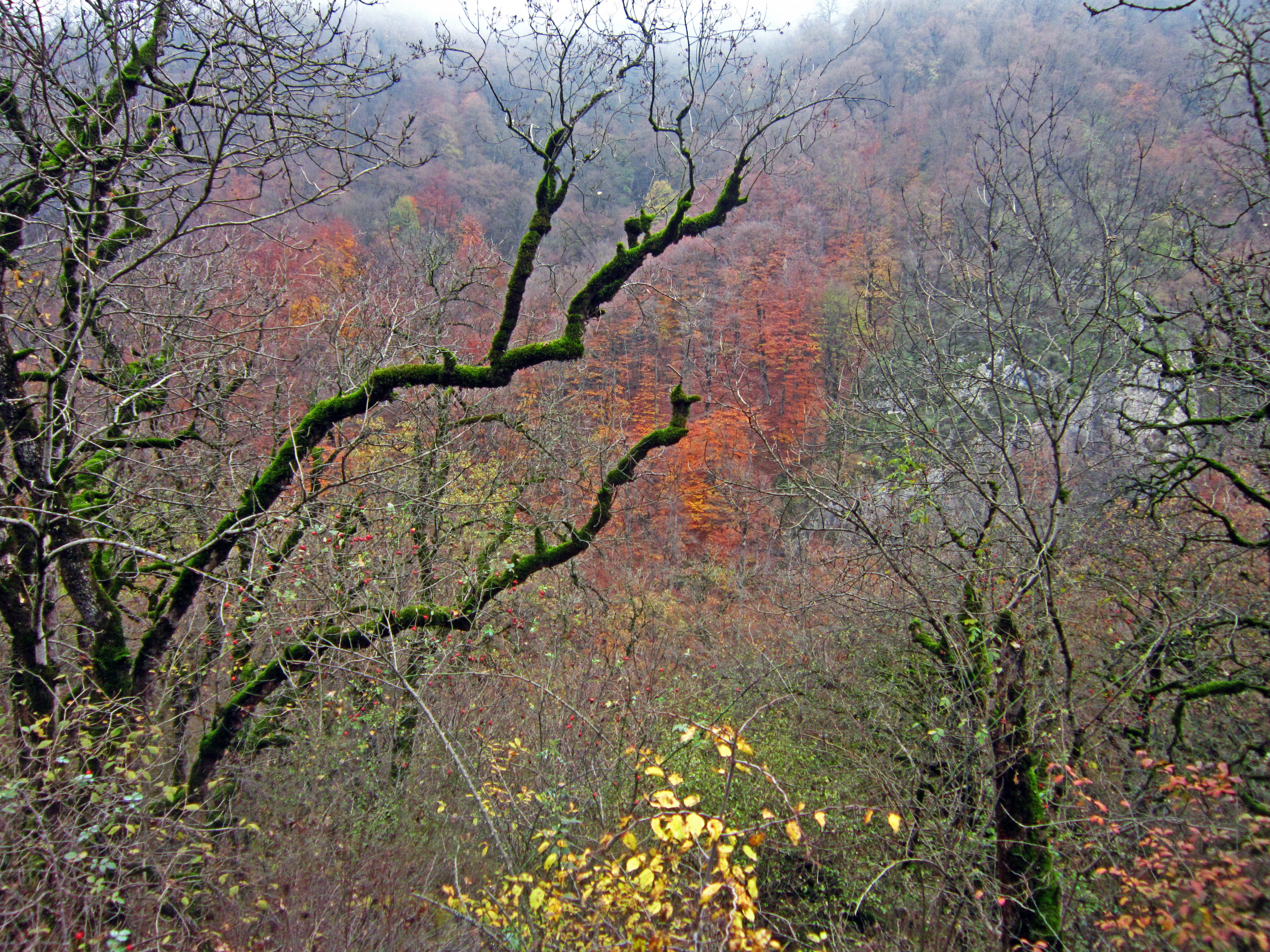
Nature on the road to the Shkhmurad Monastery

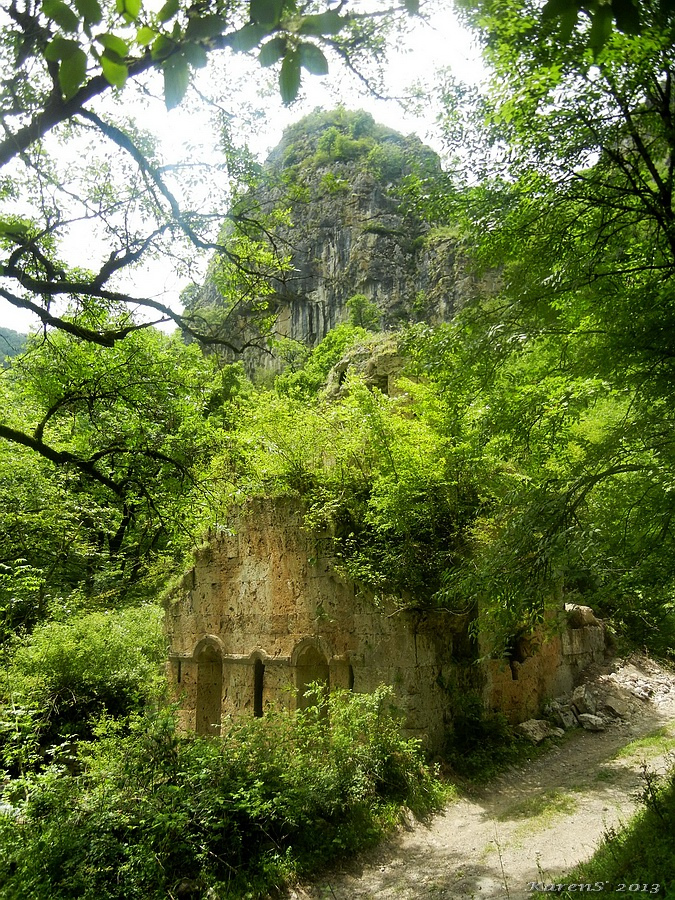
Shkhmurad Monastery

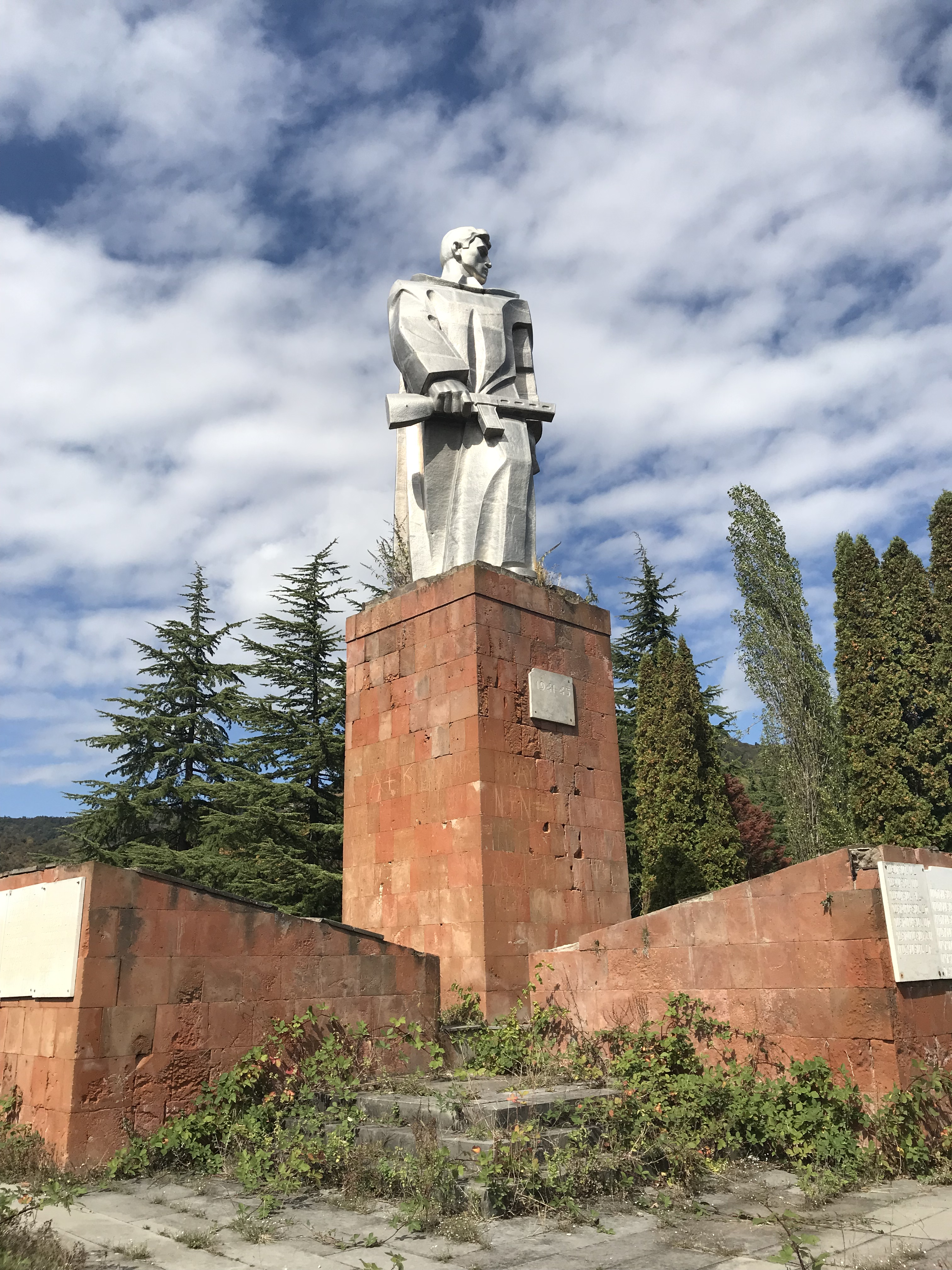
Monument

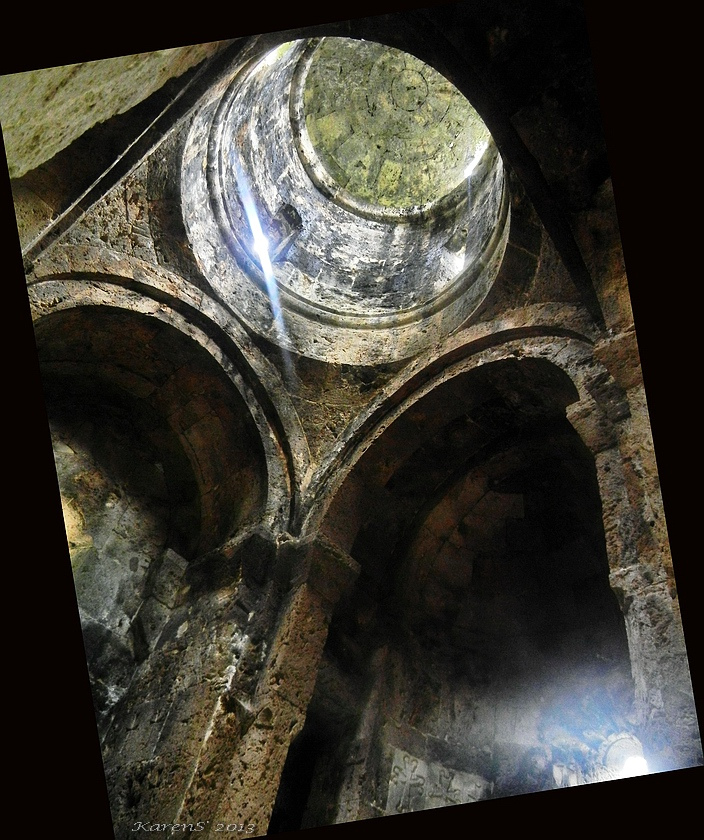
Shkhmurad Monastery interior

== Famous people ==
- Gevorg Aghajanyan - singer
