= Baghnari =

Baghnari ბაღნარი (Georgian)
- Village
- Location in Georgia Baghnari (Abkhazia)
- Coordinates: 43°25′41″N 40°08′48″E
- Country: Georgia
- Partially recognized independent country: Abkhazia
- District: Gagra
- Elevation: 230 m (750 ft)

Population (1989)
  - Total: 320
- Time zone: UTC+4 (GET)

Baghnari (Georgian: ბაღნარი, literally "place with many gardens") is a village at an altitude of 320 meters from sea level in the Gagra District of Abkhazia, (Note: The political status of Abkhazia is disputed. Having unilaterally declared independence from Georgia in 1992, Abkhazia is formally recognised as an independent state by 4 UN member states (three other states previously recognised it but then withdrew their recognition), while the remainder of the international community recognizes it as de jure Georgian territory. Georgia continues to claim the area as its own territory, designating it as Russian-occupied territory.) Georgia.

== See also ==
- Gagra District

== Literature ==
- "ბაღნარი" (PDF). Georgian Soviet Encyclopedia (in Georgian). Vol. 2. Tbilisi. 1977. p. 247.
