= Abul Khair Group =

Bangladeshi conglomerate company

- Native name: আবুল খায়ের গ্রুপ
- Type: Private
- Industry: Steel; Powdered milk Sanitary; Cement; Tea; Iron Sheet; Marble and Granite; Candy
- Founded: 1953; 73 years ago
- Founder: Abul Khair
- Headquarters: D.T. Road, Pahartali, Chittagong, Bangladesh
- Area served: Bangladesh
- Key people: Abul Kashem (Chairman); Abul Hashem (Managing Director); Abu Syed Chowdhury (Deputy Managing Director); Shah Shafiqul Islam (Director)
- Number of employees: 45,000
- Website: www.abulkhairgroup.com

Abul Khair Group (Bengali: আবুল খায়ের গ্রুপ) is a Bangladeshi diversified conglomerate based in Chittagong. Abul Kashem is the chairperson, and Abul Hashem is the managing director of Abul Khair Group. Abu Syed Chowdhury is the deputy managing director, and Shah Shafiqul Islam is the group director. All four are sons of Abul Khair.

== History ==
Abul Khair Group was founded in 1953 as a manufacturer of beedi, hand-rolled cigarettes.

Abul Khair Tobacco Company Limited offered gifts with their cigarettes in 2009. This action violated the Narcotics Control Act, 2005, which prohibits the advertising and promotion of tobacco products.

A mobile court fined the Abul Khair Group for violating Bangladesh Standards and Testing Institution rules by not labeling their milk products with a maximum retail price on 2 February 2010.

On 16 February 2012, two vessels owned by Abul Khair Group, MV Titu-22 and MV Titu-21, sank off the coast of Kutubdia Lighthouse near the Port of Chittagong after colliding with MV RAMSI. They had 26 crew members, of whom seven were lost at sea.

In May 2011, the Bangladesh Inland Water Transport Authority started an eviction against the Shah Cement factory on the banks of Shitalakkhya in Munshiganj District. They sought to demolish two jetties, which they alleged were built illegally. The Bangladesh Inland Water Transport Authority was ordered to slow down the drive as Minister of Shipping Shajahan Khan was negotiating with the owners of Abul Khair Group. The drive was suspended after successful negotiations. The Department of Environment fined Abul Khair Group 4 million taka for illegally cutting hills in Sitakunda Upazila in July 2012.

Abul Khair Group has an industrial hub in Sitakunda Upazila in Chittagong District. They sought permission from the Board of Investment to secure a loan from a foreign bank to expand their re-rolling plant in Sitakunda in July 2015.

In January 2018, the Anti-Corruption Commission interrogated three directors of the group on allegations of loan embezzlement and tax dodging. Abul Khair Steel was recognized as a Superbrand in September 2018.

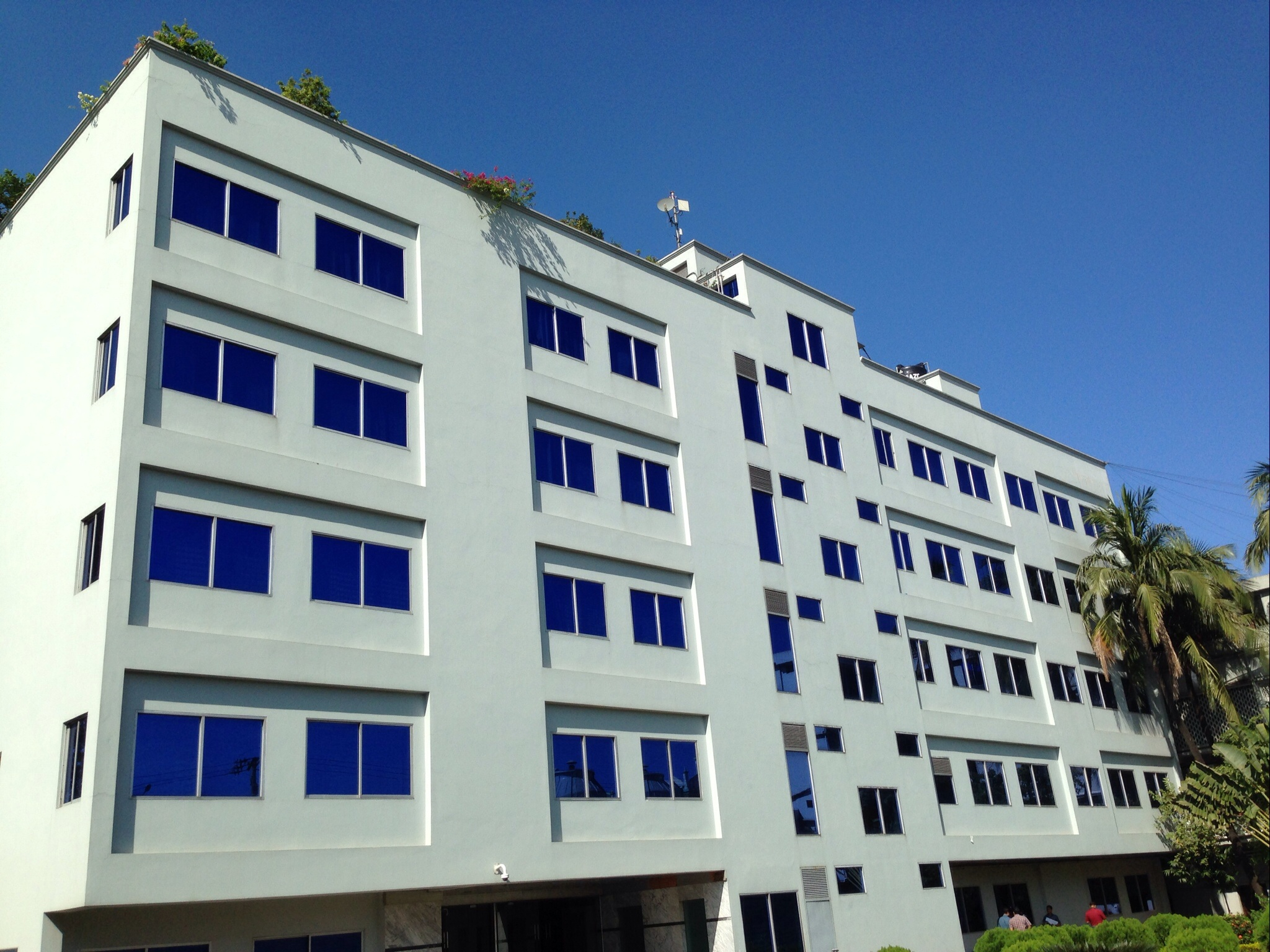
Abul Khair Group-Head office-Chittagong, Bangladesh

Abul Khair Group-owned Shah Cement had the largest market share in Bangladesh in 2019. In December 2019, Shah Cement Industries set up the largest vertical roller cement mill in the world per Guinness World Records. The roller was built by the Danish company FLSmidth. The Department of Environment found Abul Khair Steel and Power Limited, located in Madambibir Hat, Sitakunda Upazila, had violated environmental laws. The plant had received permission to produce 25 megawatts, but it was producing 75 megawatts illegally. The plant was also operating without the air treatment plant, which was inoperable.

MV Borni Prince-2, owned by the Abul Khair Group, sank after hitting a port buoy near the Karnaphuli River. It was carrying out 1,400 tonnes of scrap metal taken from a vessel anchored offshore. The crew was rescued by another nearby vessel, according to the Bangladesh Inland Water Transport Authority. The Bangladesh Coast Guard and Bangladesh Navy were tasked with salvaging the ship.

Abul Khair Group signed an agreement with the Bangladesh Chess Federation in February 2020 to sponsor the National School Chess Championship.

On 21 September 2020, a vessel, Titu-19, owned by Abul Khair Group, partially capsized near Bhasan Char. It was carrying cement clinkers, around 1,250 tonnes, from a mothership anchored off Chittagong Port to Moktarpur in Munshiganj District. According to an official of the Bangladesh Inland Water Transport Authority, the boat developed cracks due to strong currents. According to the Lighter Vessel Workers Association, the crew was rescued by Arju, an oil tanker.

Mohammad Kamrul Hasan, a sanitary inspector of Dhaka South City Corporation, filed a case against Chairman Abul Kashem and Chief Executive Officer BR Sharma of Abul Khair Milk Products Limited, accusing them of using deceptive marketing practices in promoting Marks Diabetic Milk. On 11 November 2020, Khadiza Bhuiyan of Dhaka Court found in favor of the defendant, and Hasan said he plans to file an appeal against the verdict. Hasan told the New Age newspaper, "We are fighting a losing battle."

In June 2020, the Abul Khair Group supplied free oxygen to hospitals in Chittagong during the COVID-19 pandemic in Bangladesh from its steel plant, which also had an industrial oxygen production unit. Hospitals receiving oxygen included Chattogram Field Hospital, Chittagong General Hospital, and Bangladesh Institute of Tropical and Infectious Diseases. They also provided support to AHM Mustafa Kamal, Minister of Finance, to start ICU operations in his constituency for COVID-19 patients in April 2021.

In 2021, Dhaka Custom House took legal action against Abul Khair Group, along with 26 other companies, for being involved in importing goods using false declarations to evade value-added tax (VAT), and recovered BDT 1.2 crore from one of its subsidiaries, Abul Khair Steels (AKS).

== Businesses ==
- Abul Khair Steel-Cow Brand
- Shah Cement
- Ready Mix Concrete
- Marks Full Cream Milk Powder
- AMA Full Cream Milk Powder
- AMA Coffee
- Seylon Tea
- Artistry Marble & Granite
- Coffee Bite
- Cereal
- Stella Luxury Sanitary Ware
- Goru Marka corrugated iron sheet
- Presidency University
- North South University
