= Faujdarhat Collegiate School =

- ফৌজদারহাট কলেজিয়েট স্কুল

Location
- Chittagong; Bangladesh
- Coordinates: 22.4030°N 91.7588°E

Information
- Motto: জ্ঞানই শক্তি (Knowledge is power)
- Established: 1982
- Area trustee: Faujdarhat Cadet College
- Headmaster: A.B.M. Kamrul Islam
- Enrollment: about 600
- Colors: White; Navy Blue

Faujdarhat Collegiate School is situated on the Faujdarhat Cadet College campus in Faujdarhat, Sitakunda Upazila of Chittagong District, Bangladesh. This school was mainly established for the children of the cadet college staff. It has about 600 students. The EIIN number of this institution is 105074. The ex-students of this institution celebrated two reunions. One was in 2008 and another one was on 13 January 2017.

== Extra-curriculum activities ==
The school occurs annual cultural function, annual sports competition and the reward giving ceremony every year. Generally, the rewards are given by invited guest like Principal of Faujdarhat Cadet College or the MP of Sitakunda Upazila.

== Gallery ==
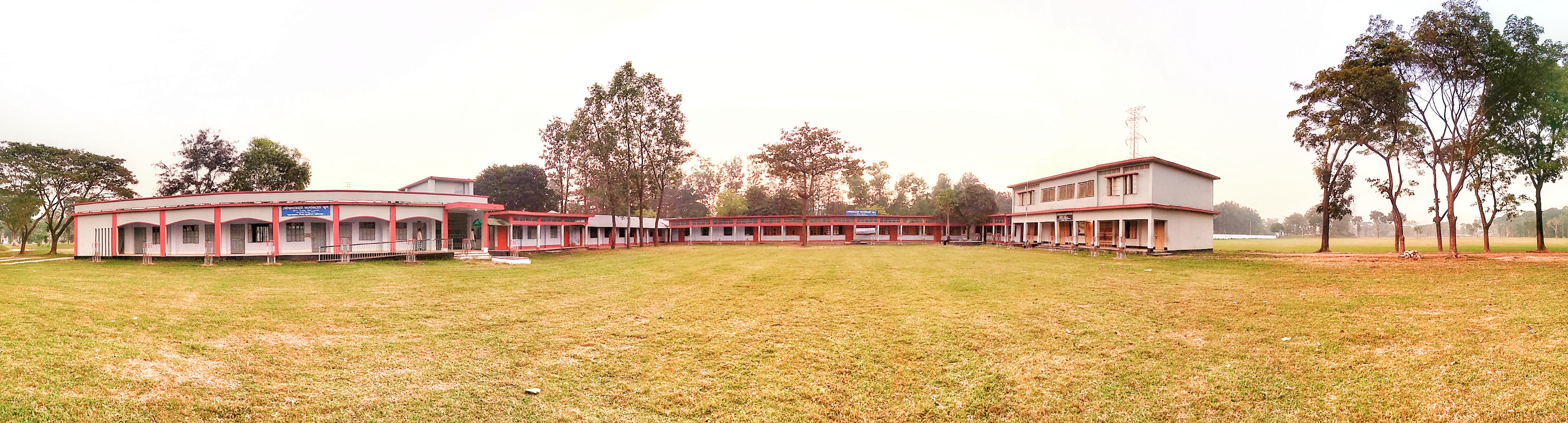
A panorama image of the institution

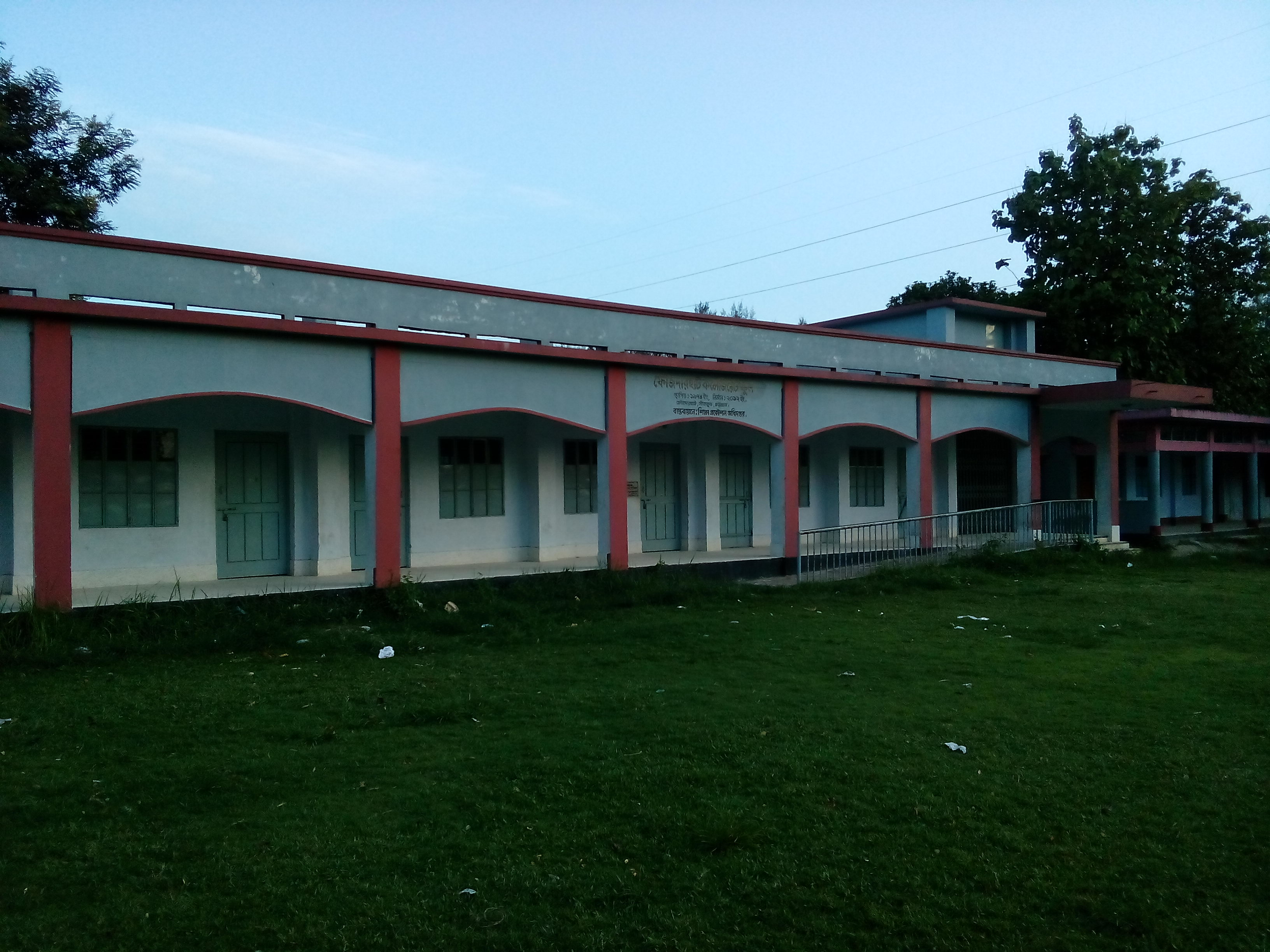
New school building

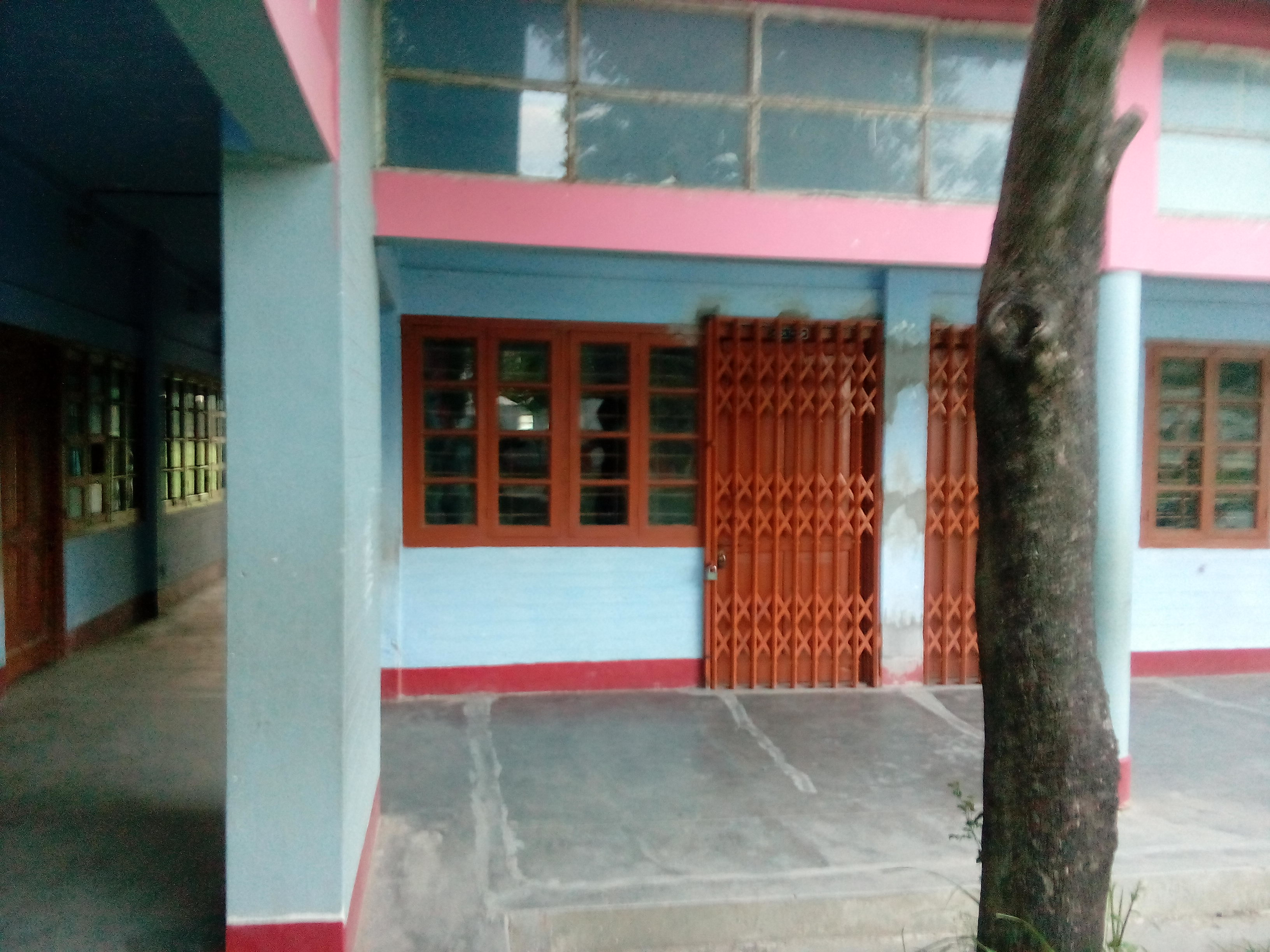
Office building

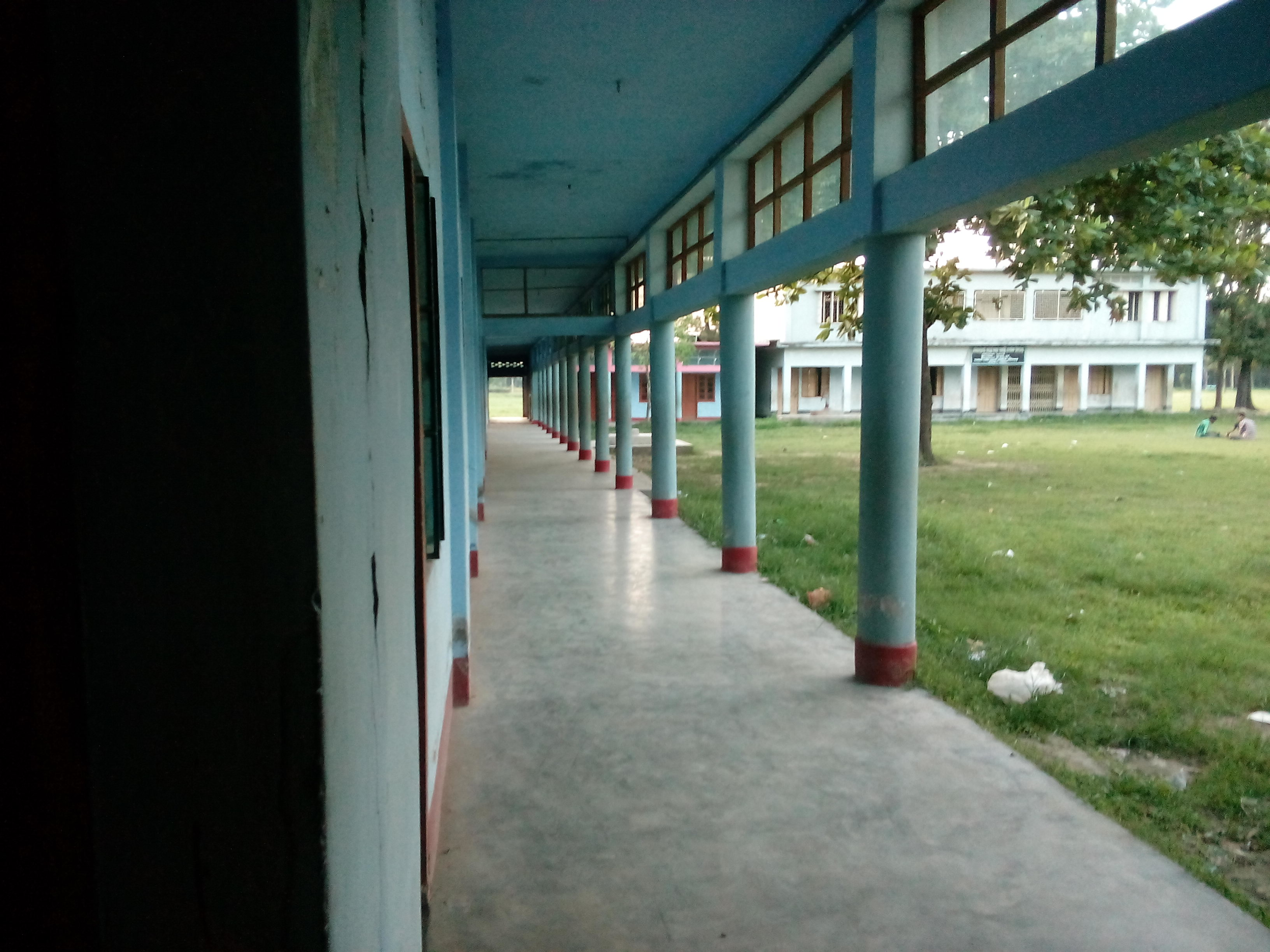
School corridor

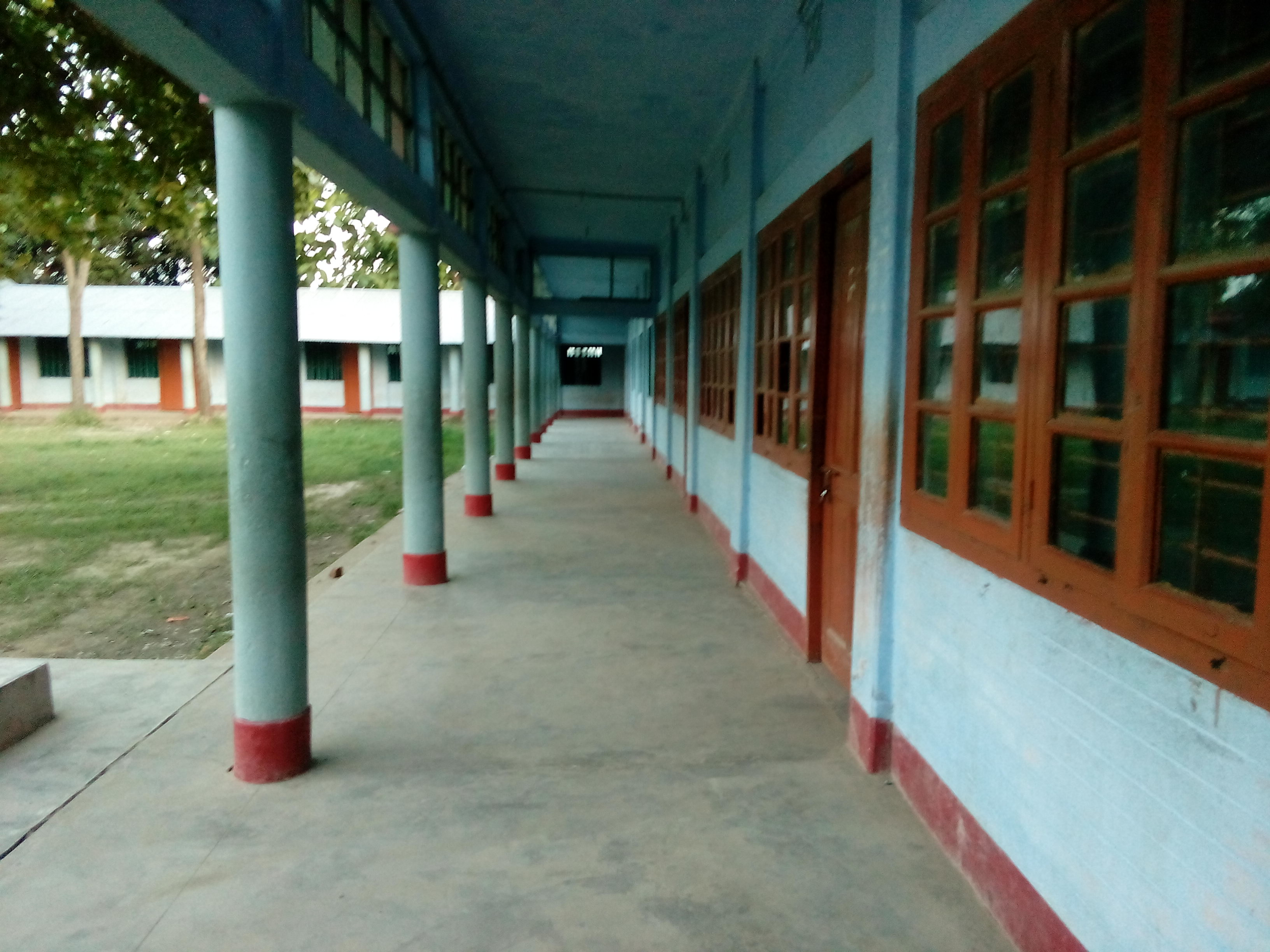
School corridor (From north angle)

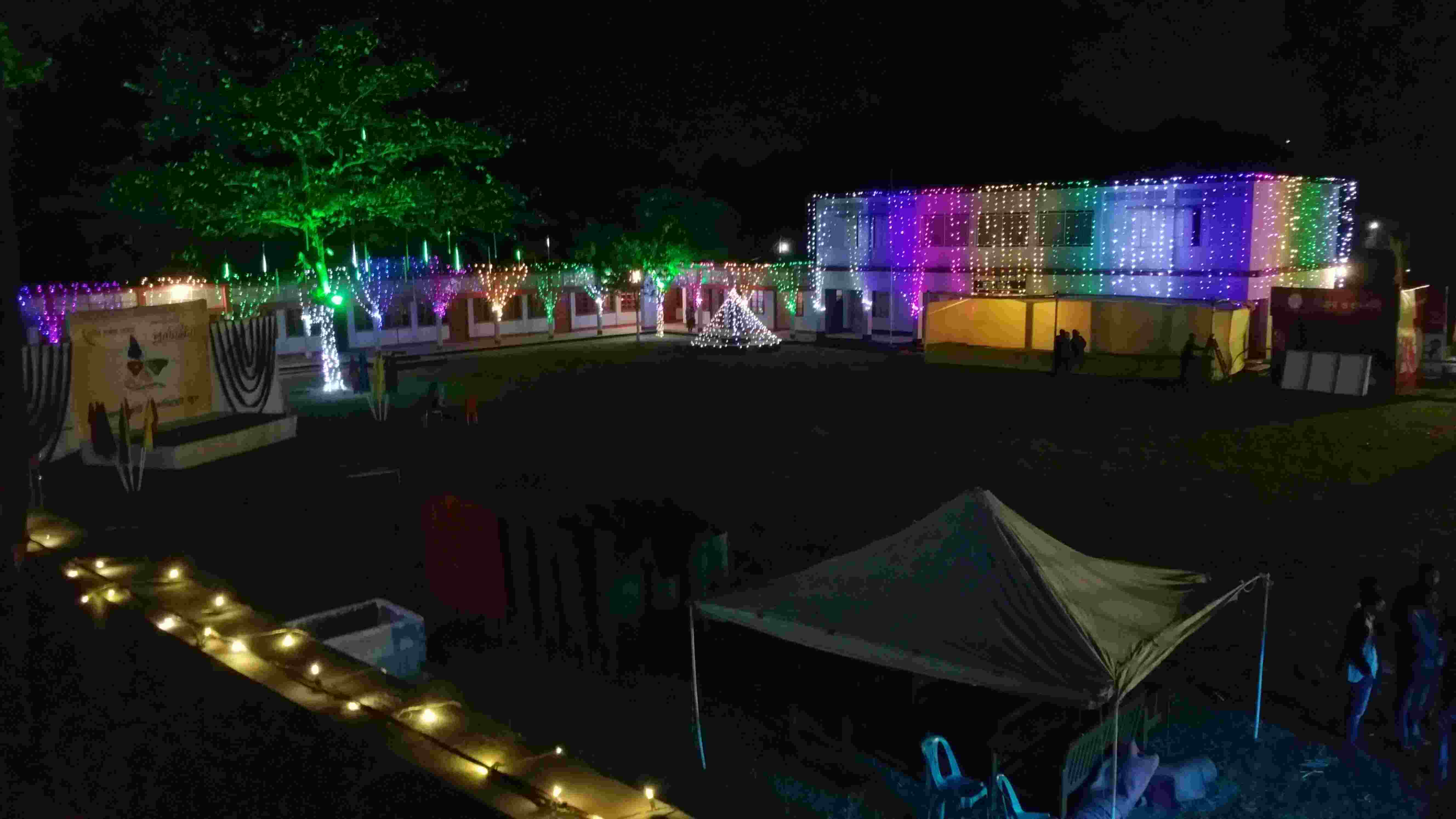
Reunion of FCS 2017
