= Faujdarhat K. M. High School =

Coordinates: 22.4027°N 91.7570°E

Faujdarhat Khoirati Miah High School
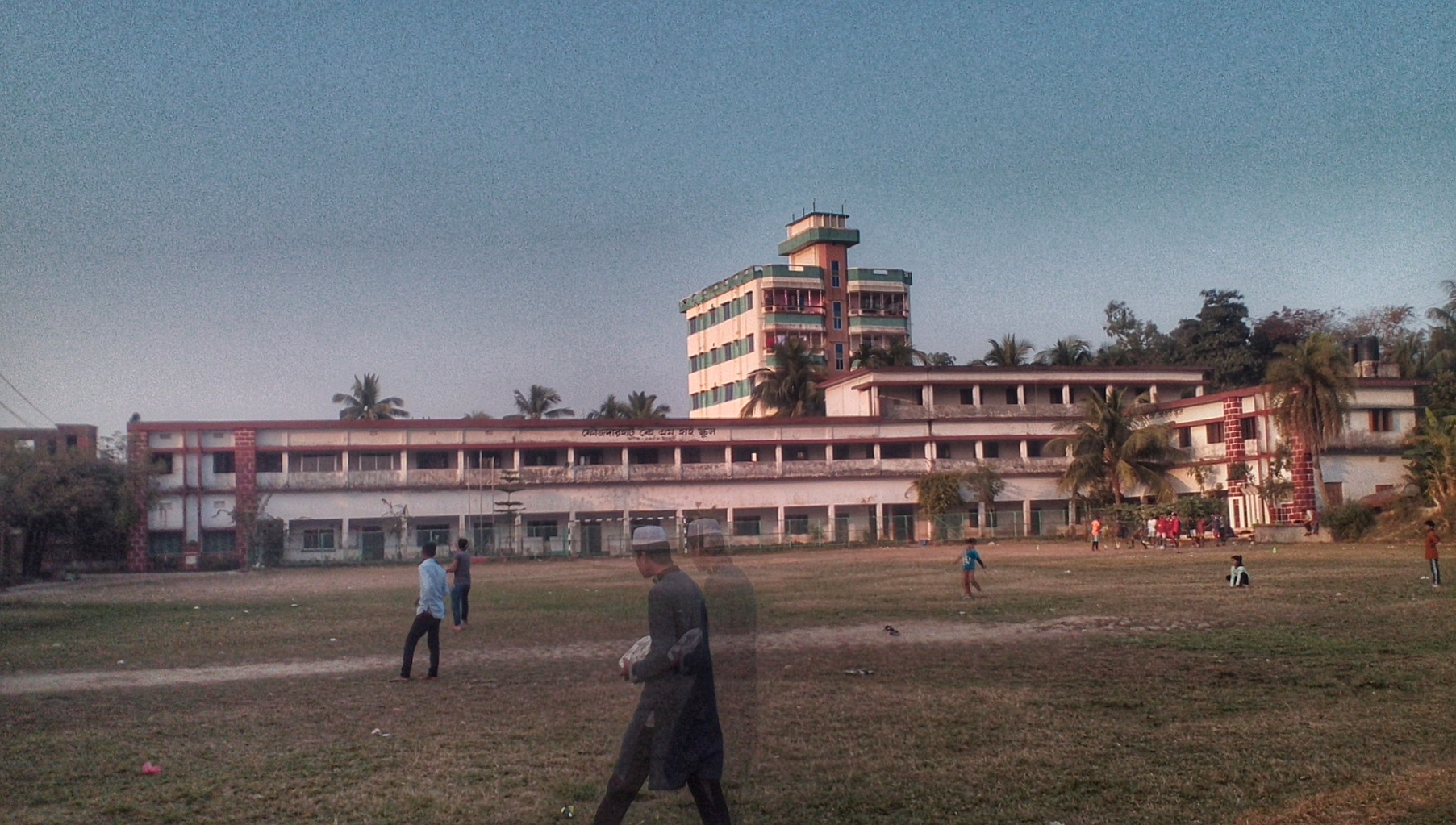
- Main building of the school
- Faujdarhat, Salimpur, Sitakunda; Chittagong, 4317; Bangladesh

Information
- School type: Secondary or "O" Level
- Established: 1956
- Founder: Khoirati Miah
- School district: Chittagong
- School code: 105078
- Director: Kaisir ul Alam
- Principal: Md. Aminul Islam
- Headmaster: Aminul Islam
- Executive headteacher: Iqbal
- Gender: Male/Female
- Age: 12+
- Classes: 290+
- Language: Bangla and English
- Schedule type: Morning School
- Schedule: 9:30 AM to 4:30 PM
- Hours in school day: 7
- Classrooms: 300+
- Campus: Good Feeling Campus
- Campus size: 1.5 acre
- Area: 2 acre
- Slogan: Build Your Feature
- School fees: 400/520

Faujdarhat Khoirati Miah High School is a secondary school in Faujdarhat, Sitakunda Upazila, Chittagong District, Bangladesh. It is situated adjacent to the Faujdarhat Market. It was established in 1956. The area of the institution is 2 acres. There are about 1500 students and 60 professional teachers in this school. 2018 Best High School in Sitakunda Commercial Area. They have 300+ Class rooms. Also have a Pond, Playground, Shaheed Minar, Markets, Canteen, A Primary School and many more.

== Students and teachers ==
There are about 1500 students in this school from grade 6th to grade 10th. And approximately 40 teachers teach lessons to the students. The current Head master of this school is Aminul Islam. The students cabinet election also held regularly.
