= Faujdarhat =

Neighborhood of Chittagong, Bangladesh

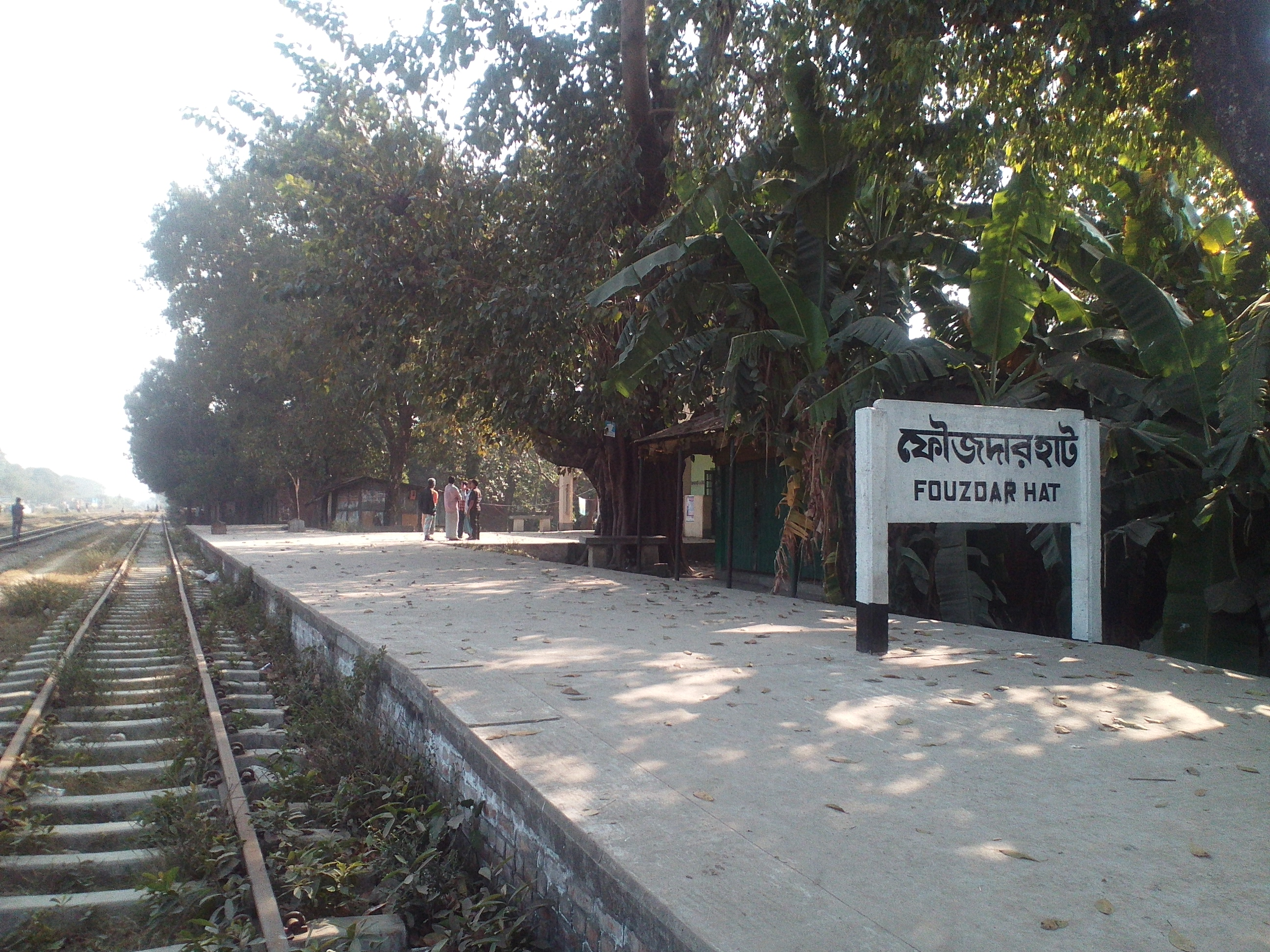
Faujdarhat Railway Station

Faujdarhat aka Fouzdarhat is a neighborhood of Chittagong in Bangladesh. It is well known as a ship breaking area, with one of the largest breaking yards in the world: Chittagong Ship Breaking Yard. There are several institutions here, including Faujdarhat Cadet College, the first cadet college of Bangladesh, established in 1958 in then East Pakistan.

== Educational institutions ==
=== Cadet colleges ===
- Faujdarhat Cadet College

=== High schools ===
- Faujdarhat Collegiate School
- Faujdarhat KM High School

=== College ===
- Faujdarhat Nursing College

=== Research institutes ===
- Bangladesh Institute of Tropical and Infectious Diseases

== Notable people ==
- Aslam Chowdhury
