= Shah Cement =

Shah Cement Industries Limited
- Company type: Private practice Limited
- Industry: Building materials
- Founded: 2002; 24 years ago
- Headquarters: Dhaka 1500, Bangladesh
- Key people: Abu Sayed Chowdhury (Managing Director)
- Products: Cement, ready-mix concrete
- Parent: Abul Khair Group
- Website: www.shahcement.com

Shah Cement Industries Limited is a Bangladeshi building materials company headquartered in Dhaka, Bangladesh. As of 2019, The company holds the highest share (14%) of the cement market in Bangladesh. It is the largest cement plant in Bangladesh in terms of production capacity. It is a subsidiary of Abul Khair Group.

== History ==
Shah Cement was founded in 2002 by Abul Khair Group in Munshiganj, Dhaka with an initial capacity of 5.2 million metric tons per annum. It also established its own power plant with the capacity of 17 megawatt.

In 2018, the company installed and commissioned a 15,000 tonnes capacity vertical roller mill (VRM) in its plant, supplied by Danish company FLSmidth. The roller mill was recognized as world's largest vertical roller mill by Guinness World Record.

The company received "Best Brand Award" from Kantar Millward Brown and Bangladesh Brand Forum in 2010, 2016 and 2017 in building materials category.

== Controversy ==
=== VAT Evasion ===
Shah Cement Industries Ltd has faced multiple allegations of large-scale VAT evasion. According to the Bangladesh National Board of Revenue (NBR), the company evaded approximately BDT 900 million in value-added tax by concealing purchase records, acquiring raw materials from unregistered suppliers, and employing other irregular methods. This finding emerged after the VAT Intelligence and Investigation Directorate of the NBR reviewed Shah Cement’s audited financial statements for the years 2012, 2013, and 2014. Previously, in 2014, the Large Taxpayers Unit (LTU) of the VAT Department also accused the company of evading BDT 788.5 million in taxes. These recurring allegations highlight concerns over the company’s compliance with Bangladesh’s taxation laws.

=== Encroachment ===
Shah Cement has been accused of illegally occupying river land at the confluence of the Dhaleshwari and Shitalakkhya rivers in Munshiganj, severely affecting the ecosystem and disrupting the natural flow of both rivers. According to four separate government reports and official land records, the company has been identified as a river encroacher multiple times—by the National River Conservation Commission (NRCC) and the Munshiganj district administration in 2018, 2019, and 2023. Despite these findings, Shah Cement has denied grabbing any river land and has refused to provide proof of ownership. Brig Gen (retd) M Sakhawat Hussain, Shipping Adviser, confirmed witnessing the encroachment firsthand in December 2024 and instructed officials to take action.

"When I visited the Dhaleshwari and Shitalakkhya rivers [in December 2024], I saw that Shah Cement has encroached on the rivers. I immediately instructed the officials concerned to take effective measures."

— M Sakhawat Hussain - (Shipping Adviser)

Land officials have identified Shah Cement's structures in RS Dag Nos. 184 and 301–308, which are officially designated as river areas. Locals recall that the factory began on a small plot but expanded each dry season by quietly filling parts of the river with sand, gradually transforming what was once a lifeline for riverside communities into a zone of environmental degradation.
