= Superbrands =

Brand survey publisher

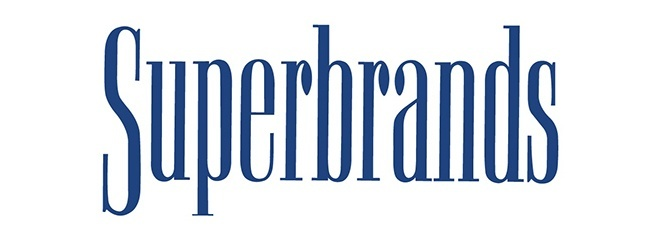
- Founded: 1994; 32 years ago
- Founder: Marcel Knobil
- Website: superbrands.com

The Superbrands organization publishes surveys related to brands. The organization also publishes a series of brand-focused books and publications. Superbrands has offices in 90 countries.

== Background ==
Superbrands was founded in 1994 by Marcel Knobil. Through The Centre for Brand Analysis, it compiles and publishes "Business" and "Consumer" lists, which include companies that are said to meet the organisation's definition of a "superbrand": "A [brand that] has established the finest reputation in its field. It offers customers significant emotional and/or tangible advantages over its competitors, which customers want and recognise." Superbrands charges companies which meet its criteria to be included in Superbrands publications and to be able to use the Superbrands recognition for marketing purposes. In Singapore in 2004, the fee was US$7,000 (equivalent to $11,653 in 2024) annually.

In each country that Superbrands operates in, it elects a "Superbrands Council" which selects brands and awards them the title of "Superbrands". Some commentators have questioned the value of ranking brands that operate in different markets against each other.

The Superbrands book

An edition of Business Superbrands.

== Publications ==
In the U.S., the book is called America's Greatest Brands.

Each participating country publishes its own Superbrands book, which promotes brands in that country. Each brand's editorial has sub-sections which cover the brand's market, achievements, history, product or service, recent developments, promotional activities, brand values, and a "things you didn't know" section. Other publications in the Superbrands stable include Business Superbrands, CoolBrands, Sport BrandLeaders, and eSuperbrands. In the United States, their publications are called America's Greatest Brands.

The company's 1995 UK publication Superbrands (1995) received a negative review in the Financial Times, with the reviewer stating that the work "offers about as much insight as a random collection of gushing PR handouts." The Times review noted that the book was a miscellany of facts and narratives and concluded that "anyone seeking an incisive commentary on UK superbrands should look elsewhere." Cool Brand Leaders: an Insight into Britain's Coolest Brands 2003, which included sixty brands, based on the results of a public poll, was criticised in the Financial Times for being "misguided" in its attempt to define "cool" and for producing "results [that] range from the perplexing to the bizarre."

== See also ==
- Michelin Guide
