= Chittagong General Hospital =

- Chittagong Medical College
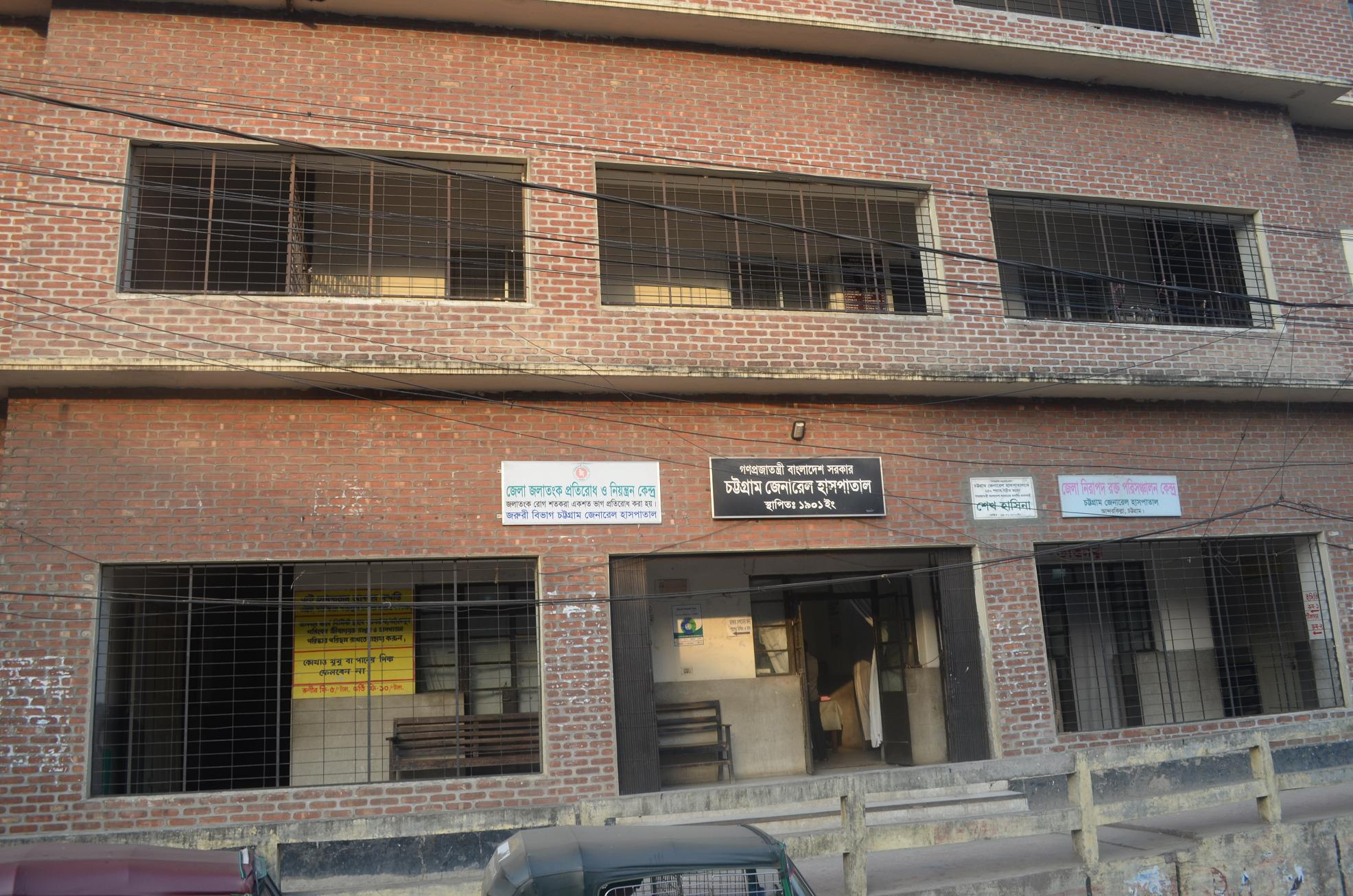

Geography
- Location: Rangmahal Hill, Andarkilla, Chittagong., Chittagong, Bangladesh
- Coordinates: 22.3412045°N 91.8381286°E

Organisation
- Care system: Public
- Type: General
- Affiliated university: Chittagong Medical College

Services
- Emergency department: No
- Beds: 250

History
- Founded: 1840

Links
- Lists: Hospitals in Bangladesh

Chittagong General Hospital (a.k.a. Chittagong 250 bed General Hospital),(Bengali: চট্টগ্রাম জেনারেল হাসপাতাল) is a public hospital in Chittagong, Bangladesh. It is a two hundred and fifty bed facility. The Chittagong General Hospital has been affiliated with Chittagong Medical College since 1959.

== History ==
General Hospital was mainly established as a dispensary in 1840, and was later developed into a hospital on the Rangmahal Hill in Andarkilla, Chittagong. The Rangmahal hill was historically renowned as the part of the Arakani Fort, which was burnt and ravaged by the action of the Mughal Navy in 1666.

== Gallery ==
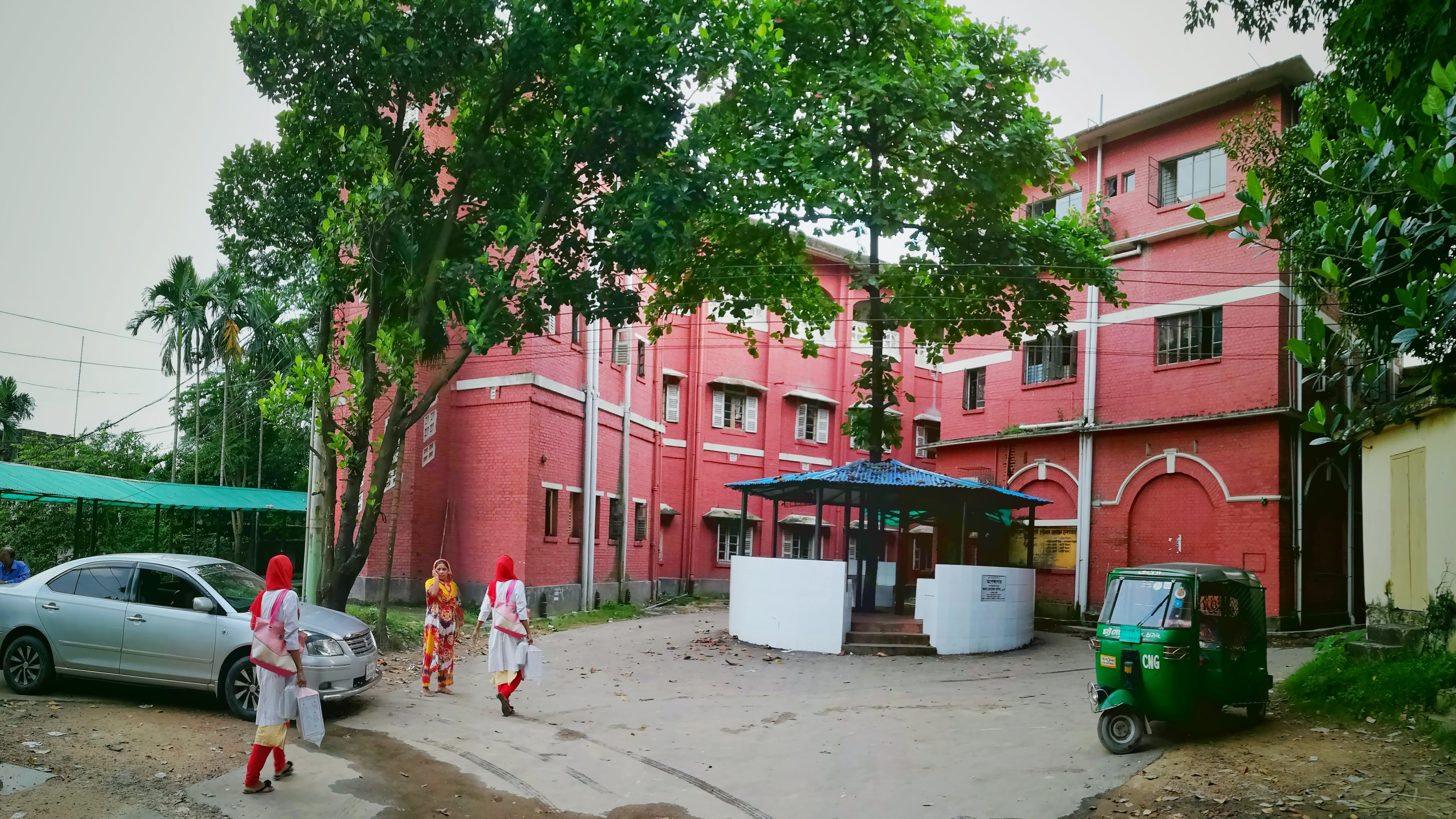
Back side of Hospital

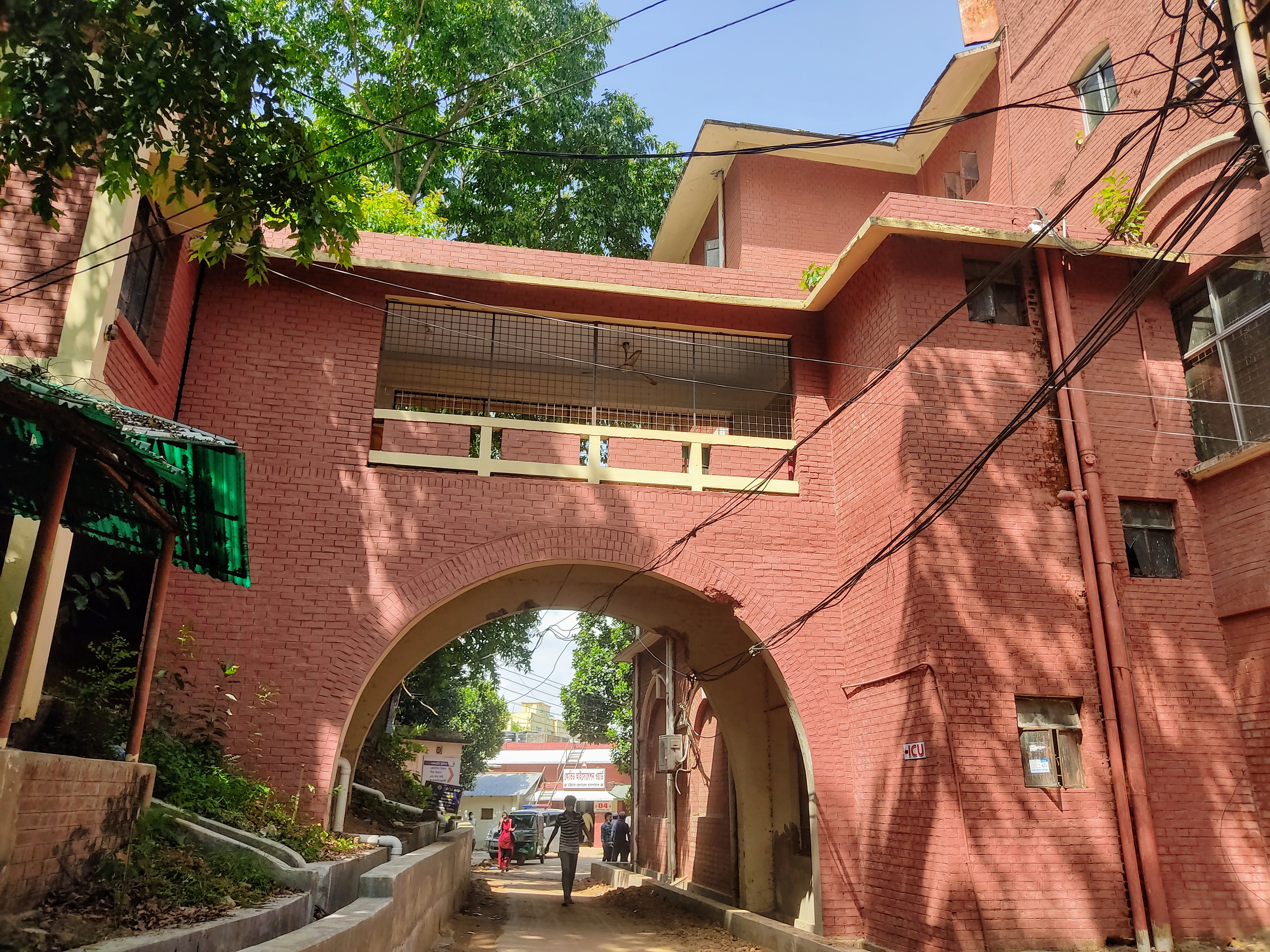
Gate of Hospital

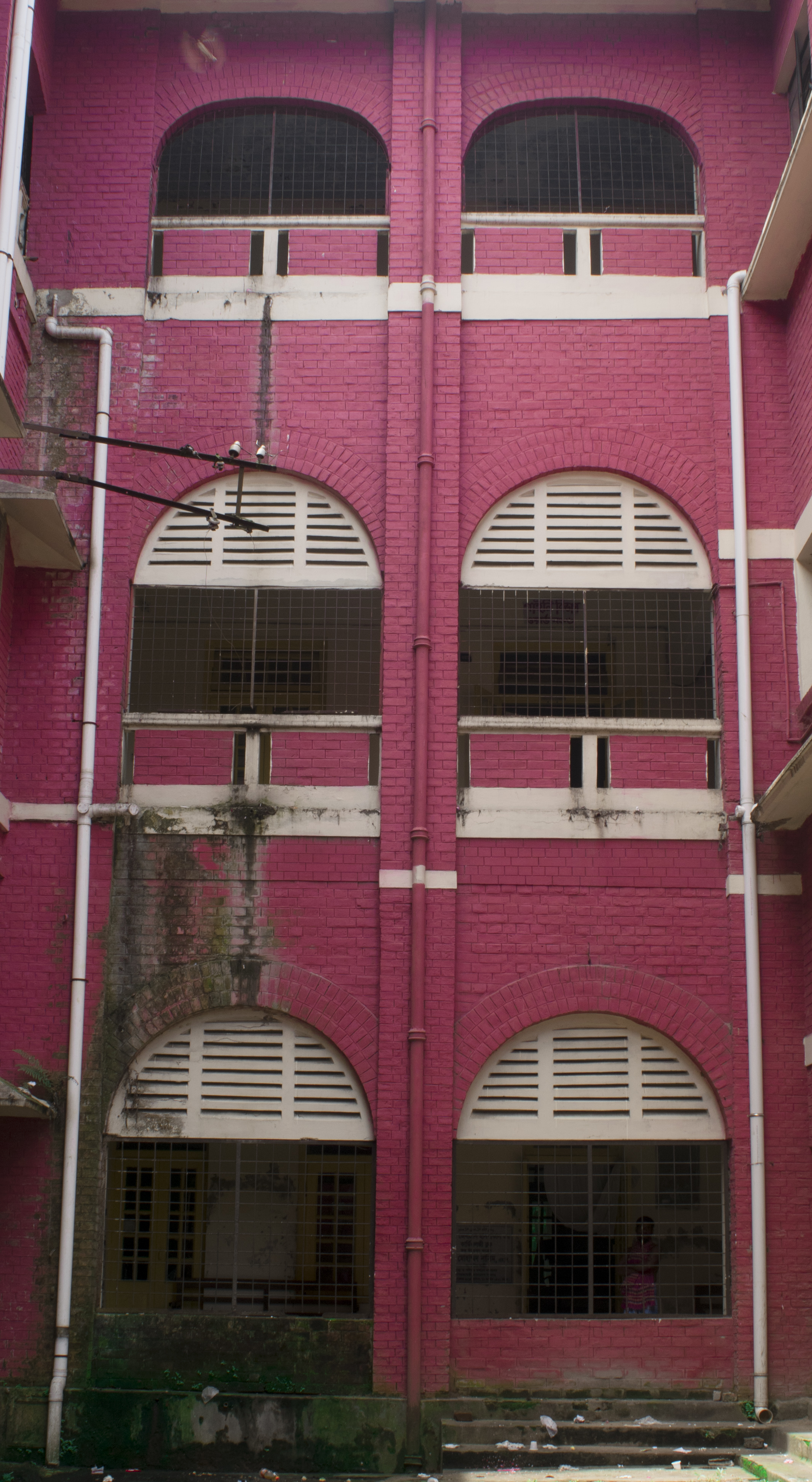
Floors of Hospital
