= Steel industry in Bangladesh =

Overview of the steel industry of Bangladesh

BSRM Steel Mill

The steel industry is a vital and expanding sector of the Bangladesh economy. Centered in the port city of Chittagong, its growth is driven by the rapid expansion of shipbuilding, real estate, and large-scale national infrastructure projects.

== History ==
The first ever steel mill was established in 1952 by the H Akberali Group of Industries as the "Bangladesh Steel Re-rolling Mills (BSRM)". Located at Nasirabad, Chittagong, the plant formed re-enforcing bars and structural sections. The mill gradually prolonged, adopting new technological know-how by setting up a cross-nation European mill in 1987 which incorporated a wire-rod mill. The BSRM group added a captive billet manufacturing plants in 1996 so as to make sure a stable distribution of billets of its plants. In 2006, the company installed pilot cold rolling mill to make ribbed high strength wires.

During this period, PHP Integrated Steel Ltd was established as one of the country's largest integrated mills. Other significant producers also emerged, including KSRM, GPH Ispat, RRM, AKS, and Anwar Ispat, alongside several specialized re-rolling mills.
