= Bangladesh Institute of Tropical and Infectious Diseases =

Medical school in Chittagong, Bangladesh

- বাংলাদেশ ইনস্টিটিউট অব ট্রপিকাল এন্ড ইনফেকসিয়াস ডিজিসেস
- Other name: BITID
- Type: Postgraduate institute and Hospital
- Established: 2013
- Academic affiliations: Chittagong Medical College
- Director: Dr Md Abu Tayab (Retired; First Director)
- Location: Chittagong, Bangladesh
- Campus: Faujdarhat
- Website: www.bitidbd.org

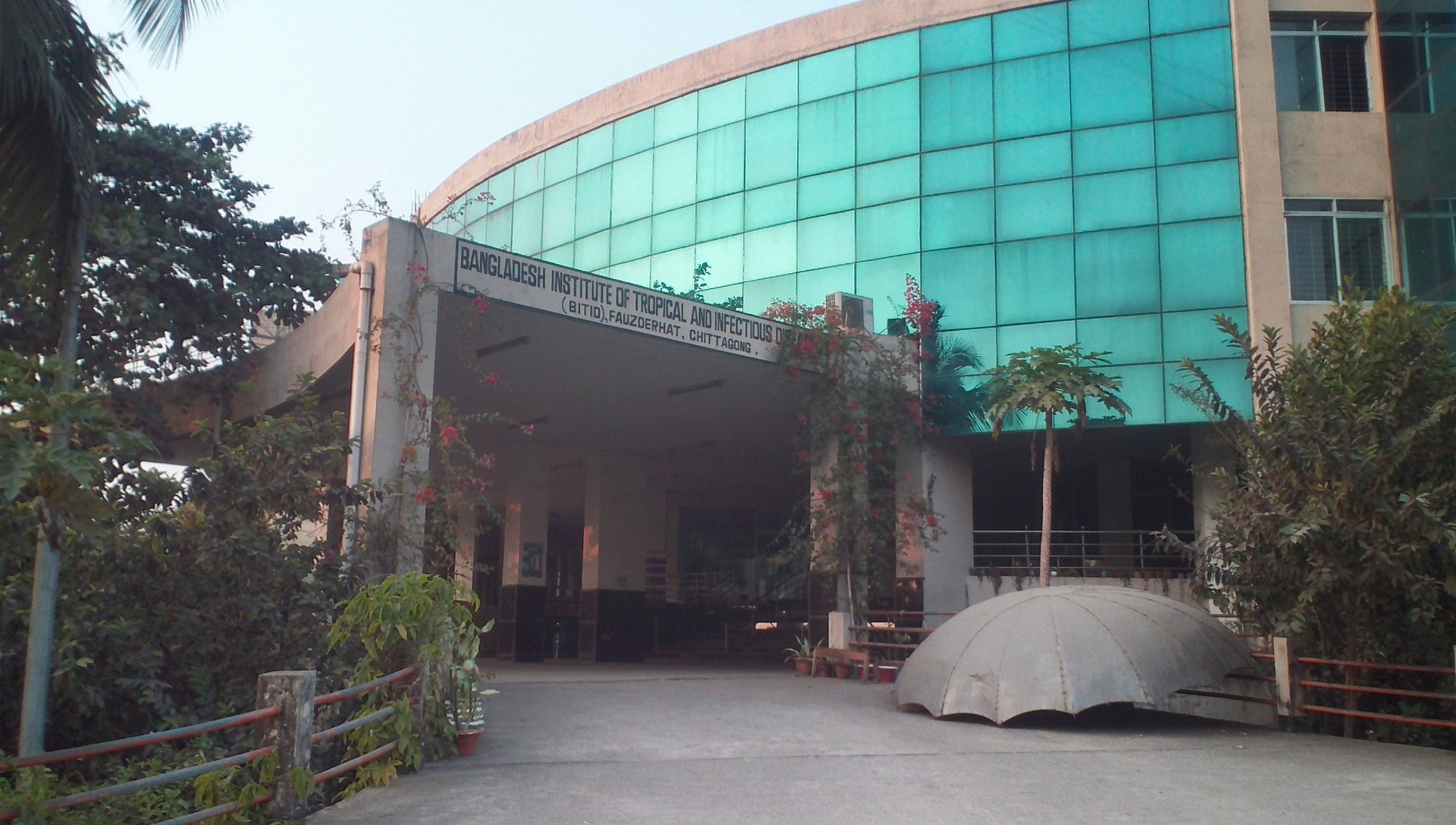
Entrance of BITID

Bangladesh Institute of Tropical and Infectious Diseases is a public medical postgraduate institute and hospital situated at Faujdarhat in Chittagong. It was established in 2013 with an attached 20-bed Infectious Disease Hospital.

== History ==
Bangladesh Institute of Tropical and Infectious Diseases was established in 2013 to research and treat tropical diseases in Bangladesh. The institute was a 20 bed hospital until Dr Md Abu Tayab, the institute's first director transformed into a 120 bed hospital, and formed the country's first Bio Safety Lab (Level 3) which was put into use during the Covid-19, helping counter the pandemic in Chattogram.
