= Tomb of Ataga Khan =

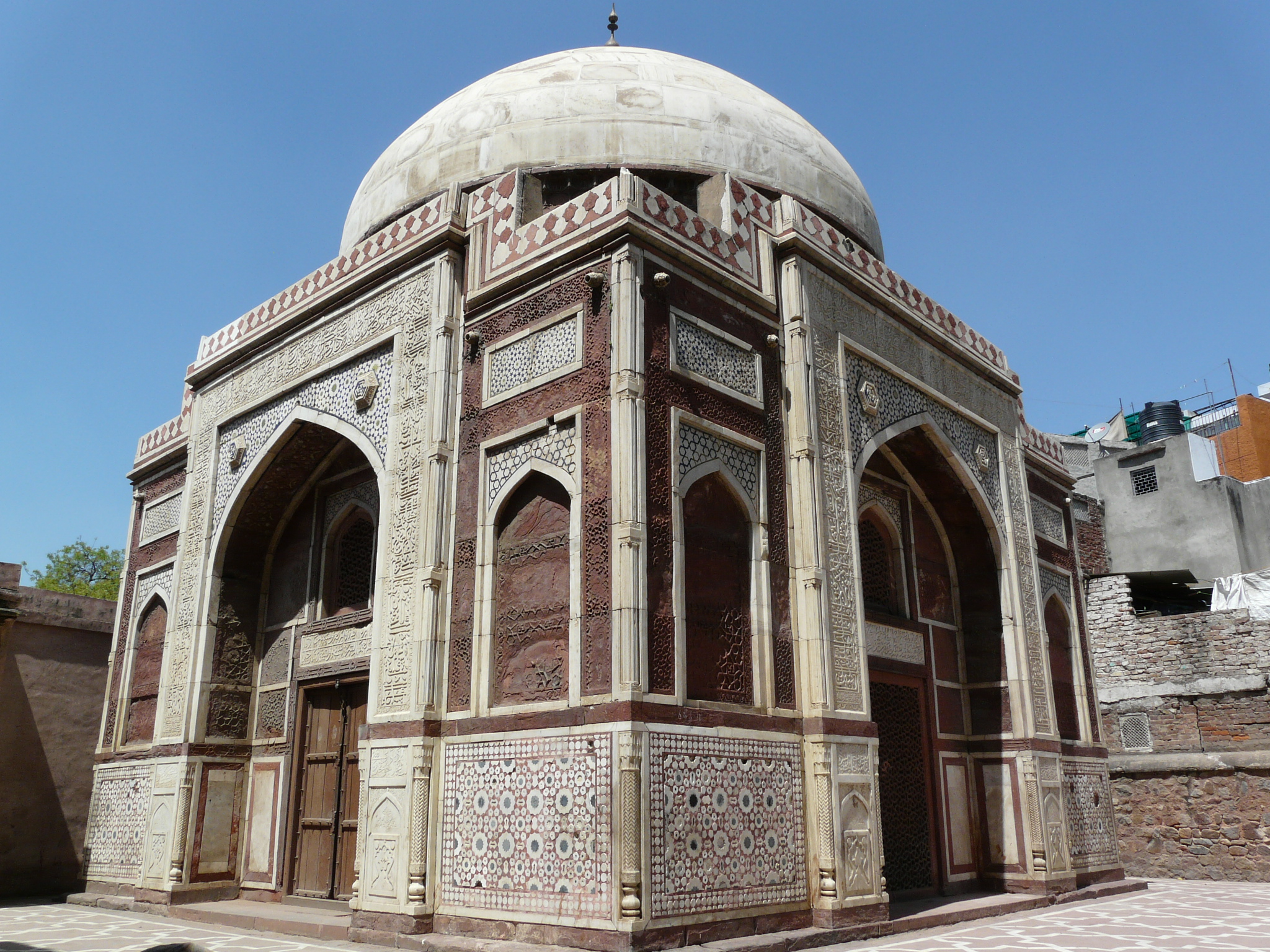
- Interactive map of the Tomb of Ataga Khan area

General information
- Architectural style: Mughal architecture
- Location: Delhi, India
- Coordinates: 28.59146°N 77.24216°E
- Construction started: 1562
- Completed: 1566

Technical details
- Material: Sandstone

Design and construction
- Architect: Ustad Khuda Quli

The Tomb of Ataga Khan is a 16th-century mausoleum located in the outer limits of the Nizamuddin Dargah complex in Delhi, India. Built during the reign of Mughal Emperor Akbar, it was dedicated to Ataga Khan, an important noble of Akbar's court.

== History ==
Ataga Khan was Mughal Emperor Akbar's prime minister, and husband to Jiji Anga, one of Akbar's wet nurses. In 1562, he was murdered by Adham Khan, a general of Akbar, as a result of jealousy and court intrigue. Adham Khan himself was immediately killed via defenestration as punishment on the orders of an enraged Akbar. Subsequently, Akbar ordered the construction of a mausoleum for Ataga Khan. Anthony Welch speculates that Ataga Khan's second son Mirza Aziz Koka was more directly responsible for the patronage of the tomb. The tomb's architect was Ustad Khuda Quli, while its calligrapher was Baqi Muhammad from Bukhara. Construction of the tomb began in 1562 and was completed in 1566.

In 1905, the colonial government's Archaeology Department reached an agreement with the hereditary guardians of the tomb to split custody, whereby conservation of the site would be directed by archaeologists, and repairs would be financed by the government. In return, public access to the site would be allowed, save the central tomb, and with the exception of the urs ceremony, when the site would be closed. This agreement was made through the terms of the Ancient Monuments Preservation Act of 1904.

== Architecture ==
The tomb of Ataga Khan draws from the form of previous Indian tombs. Particularly, it takes after the cube-shaped structure typical of Delhi tombs; the building is a cube of side length 10 m. The tomb features an outer dome of diameter 4 m, under which is an inner dome. The entrance to the structure is from the south, through a wooden door. Located in the outer limits of the Nizamuddin Dargah complex, the site on which the tomb lies is raised compared to that of the dargah courtyard.

The primary building material of the tomb is rough sandstone. This is faced with red sandstone (inlaid with coloured stones) and white marble (featuring carved verses from the Quran). This kind of decoration draws from the Qila-i-Kuhna mosque. The interior of the tomb was once covered in plaster decoration, which today only exists in fragments. The particular choices made for the Quranic epigraphy on the tomb, as well as the structure's location in the saintly Nizamuddin Dargah, have been argued by scholars to be indicative of the honor and martyrdom status ascribed to Ataga Khan by the Mughals after his death.

== See also ==
- Tomb of Adham Khan
