= Jodha Akbar =

Indian television series

- Genre: Historical drama
- Created by: Ekta Kapor
- Developed by: Ekta Kapoor
- Screenplay by: R M Joshi; Anil Nagpal; Binita Desai; Manish Paliwal; Kirtida Gautam; Neha Singh; Mayuri Roy Chaudhary; Sahil Dogra; Koel Chaudhuri; Dialogues; Dheeraj Sarna
- Directed by: Santram Varma; Ranjan Singh; Vicky Chauhan; Arshad Yunus Khan; Kadar Kazi (KK); Anil V. Kumar
- Creative directors: Shaalu; Kadar Kazi (KK)
- Starring: Rajat Tokas; Paridhi Sharma; Lavina Tandon
- Theme music composer: Lalit Sen
- Country of origin: India
- Original languages: Hindi; Urdu
- No. of seasons: 1
- No. of episodes: 566

Production
- Producers: Ekta Kapoor; Shobha Kapoor
- Production locations: Jaipur; Karjat
- Cinematography: Santosh Suryavashi
- Editors: Vikas Sharma; Vishal Sharma; Sandeep Bhatt
- Camera setup: Multi-camera
- Running time: 24 minutes
- Production company: Balaji Telefilms

Original release
- Network: Zee TV
- Release: 18 June 2013 – 7 August 2015

Jodha Akbar is an Indian historical drama television series that aired from 18 June 2013 to 7 August 2015 on Zee TV. The show was produced by Ekta Kapoor under Balaji Telefilms, and had starred Rajat Tokas and Paridhi Sharma. Critics have praised the series for its acting performances, scope, soundtrack and production values.

== Plot ==
Jalaluddin Mohammad, a warrior and son of Emperor Humayun and Hameeda Bano Begum, became the Emperor of the Mughal dynasty at a very young age. He is influenced by his regent Bairam Khan and his foster mother Maham Anga. Khan trains Jalal to be a ruthless ruler and control his kingdom through terror and fear. Jalal becomes a heartless and fearsome ruler whom the people dislike. He desires to conquer the entire Hindustaan and the golden Rajputana. Jodha Bai, princess of Amer, daughter of Raja Bharmal and Rani Mainavati, is a kind and intelligent young girl who believes that rule is spread by love and togetherness, not by force.

When Jodha is at a temple to offer prayers on her birthday, along with Moti Bai, her friend, a band of mughal soldiers enter the temple to loot the jewellery on the goddess. When Moti tries to stop them, they try to molest her. Angered, Jodha pledges to destroy Jalal and present his head before the goddess. Later, Moti, embarrassed by the turn of events, attempts to commit suicide, but Jodha prevents her.

Meanwhile, Jalal, with the help of Sujamal, attacks Amer and wins the battle. He demands high monthly taxes from Amer and keeps Jodha's brothers as hostages. Later, when Sharifuddin continued to increase his demands, King Bharmal's friend suggests that he should meet Jalal to negotiate. During the meeting, Bharmal's friend advises him to marry Jodha to Jalal. Jodha disagrees and tries to poison herself, but after much persuasion agrees to the marriage for Amer's safety, but with two conditions: to remain a Hindu after her marriage and to carry the statue of Krishna with her to Agra. Jalal agrees despite the protests of his courtiers and advisors, as he wants to humiliate her in return of her insults. After the marriage, Jodha maintains her distance. Later, Jalal's wife and childhood friend, Rukaiya, becomes pregnant. The kingdom rejoices at the thought of an heir, but the happiness is short-lived as Maham Anga poisons Rukaiya, leading to a miscarriage. Anga frames Jodha and her family for the miscarriage, but Jodha is proved innocent. Jalal accepts his mistake and feels guilty for doubting Jodha. He gives Jodha freedom to divorce him and head back to Amer if she wishes. Jodha accepts but her mother refuses. Jodha tries to commit suicide but Jalal saves her. Jalal develops sympathy for Jodha. He realizes how lonely she has become. He starts spending more time with her, and Jodha realizes Jalal means well for his people.

Jalal and Jodha finally fall in love. Jodha becomes pregnant with twins, one of whom Rukaiya claims. While Jalal denies this claim, Jodha promises her one of the twins. The twins are killed shortly after birth, their death plotted by Jalal's enemies, who hunts them down and kills them. The death of the twins leaves the kingdom in sorrow, and Jalal, Jodha and Rukaiya are devastated. Jodha and Jalal again grow distant while Jalal turns into his former cruel self to avenge his sons' lives. He stays away from his court in Salim's sanctuary, along with Jodha for two years. Jodha and Jalal reconcile, and Jodha becomes pregnant, giving birth to another son whom Jalal names Salim. Jalal and Jodha return to the court and upon seeing the child, Rukaiya tries to claim him, but is met by Jalal's wrath. She then vows to destroy Salim.

Salim, a few years older, is loved by everyone. He meets a girl named Nadhira, who is the daughter of the woman who once saved Salim's life when he was a baby. Nadhira and Salim instantly dislike each other. Salim is manipulated by Rukaiya through wine and drugs. She plants false scenarios in his mind to make him hate his parents, and entices him into women and addictions. His behaviour becomes more irrational, leading to the banishment of Nadhira and her family. This angers Jalal to the point that he sends Salim to live in a war field until he becomes an adult. Salim grows up to be indifferent, hating his parents, but having a soft spot for Rukaiya. Upon returning to Agra, Salim bonds with his brothers but never seeks his parents. He falls in love with a girl, Anarkali, only to discover she is Nadhira. She had changed her name to find work in Agra. Salim hates her, believing he had been betrayed.

Salim and Anarkali work out their relationship problems. Rukaiya's true intentions are unveiled. Salim realises his mistakes and regrets not trusting his parents more.

== Cast ==
=== Main ===
- Rajat Tokas as Abu'l-Fath Jalal-ud-din Muhammad Akbar "Akbar I": Emperor of the Mughal Empire; Humayun and Hamida Banu Begum's son; Hassan, Hussain, aram bano, Murad, Daniel and Jahangir I's father;
- Paridhi Sharma as Jodha Bai "Mariam-uz-Zamani": MALIKA-E-HIND, Mallika-e-Muezamma, Wali Nimat Begum, Chief Empress consort of the Mughal Empire; Princess of Amer, Hassan Mirza, Hussain Mirza and Jahangir I's mother;
- Lavina Tandon as Ruqaiya Sultan Begum: Chief Empress, MALIKA-E-KHAAS, Padshah Begum, consort of the Mughal Empire; Akbar I's first wife; Humayun's niece, Hussain Mirza's foster mother
  - Smiley Suri as Ruqaiya Sultan Begum (for first few episodes)
  - Jagrati Sethia as young Ruqaiya Sultan Begum
- Ashwini Kalsekar as Maham Anga: WAZIR-E-ALIA, Prime minister of Mughal Sultanate, Chief wet nurse and foster mother of Akbar
- Manisha Yadav as Salima Sultan Begum: Chief Empress consort of the Mughal Empire; Humayun's niece; Akbar I's third wife; Bairam Khan's widow, Rahim and Murad's foster mother
- Chhaya Ali Khan as Hamida Banu Begum "Mariam Makani": MALIKA-E-AZAM, Former Chief Empress consort of the Mughal Empire, mother of Akbar
- Ravi Bhatia as Mirza Nur-ud-din Baig Muhammad Khan Salim "Jahangir I": Emperor of the Mughal Empire; Akbar I and Jodha Bai's son
  - Ayaan Zubair Rahami as Crown Prince Salim of the Mughal Empire
- Heena Parmar as Anarkali "Sharf-un-Nisa", A courtesan
  - Saniya Touqeer as Child Anarkali

=== Recurring ===
- Ankita Dubey / Ankita Chaudhry as Moti Bai: Jodha's companion and chief servant
- Chetan Hansraj as
  - Adham Khan: Maham Anga's son; Haider's father
  - Haider Khan: Adham Khan and Javeda's son
- Prianca Shharma/Praveshika Chouhan as Javeda Begum: Adham Khan's wife; Haider Khan's mother
- Parag Tyagi as Sharif-ud-din Hussain: Khwaja Moin's son; Bakshi Banu's estranged husband; Mehtab's father
- Sonakshi More as Bakshi Banu Begum: Mughal princess; Jalal's half-sister; Sharifuddin's estranged wife; Mehtab's mother
- Ankit Raizada as Man Singh I, Jodha's Nephew,
- Kaif Ali Khan / Ayush Anand as Abdul Rahim Khan-i-Khanan: Bairam Khan's son with his deceased wife; Jalal and Salima Sultan's adoptive son
  - Veer Lodaya as child Rahim
- Shraddha Singh as Gulbadan begum: Humayun's half sister, author of Humayun-nama
- Lokendra Rajawat as Ataga Khan, Akbar's caretaker
- Amarpreet Rait as Jiji Anga: chief servant and companion of Malika-e-azam (Hamida Bano), one of Akbar's Foster mother, Atgah Khan's wife
- Ashok Devaliya as Hoshiyar Khan: chief servant (Kasim) of Ruqaiya
- Manoj Patel as Resham Khan: Chief servant (Kasim) of Maham Anga
- Rajeev Saxena as Raja Bharmal of Amer, Jodha's Father
- Natasha Sinha as Rani Champavathi Solanki (Mainavathi) of Chaulukya, Jodha's mother
- Kunal Bhatia / Tejender Singh Kadewale as Rajkumar Bhagwant Das: Maan Singh and Maan Bai's father, Jodha's Brother
- Nupur Saxena / Unknown as Rai Kanwar: Bhagwant's wife; Maan Singh and Maan Bai's mother
- Jyotsna Chandola as Maan Bai, Jodha's Niece
- Farida Dadi as Rani Apoorva devi of Bikaner, Rajmatha of Amer, Bharmal's mother; Jodha's grandmother
- Dharti Bhatt as Sukanya of Dhawalgarh, Jodha's sister
- Pragati Choursiya as Shivani, Jodha's sister
- Bhakti Narula as Lilavati, Apoorva's daughter-in-law, Jodha's aunt
- Kalyani Trivedi / Zarina Roshan Khan as Shagunibai: Priestess of Kaali Temple, clairvoyant
- Juhi Aslam as Zakira, servant Jodha bai, former servant of Benazir
- Vicky Batra as Kunwar Sujamal: Bharmal's nephew; Jodha's cousin
- Gandharva Pardeshi as Rajkumar Jaganath
- Dev Bishit as Rajkumar Khangar
- Akhil Vaid as Rajkumar Raj Singh
- Nisha Pareek as Naazima Begum: woman living in the Harem (Palace of Queens)
- Kiran Shergill as Ruksaar Begum: Daniyal Mirza's mother; woman living in the Harem (Palace of Queens)
- Nisha Pareek as Nazima Begum: including the wife of Jalal; woman living in the Harem (Palace of Queens)
- Vaibhav Singh as Aziz Koka: Atgah Khan's son
- Vijay Badlani as Ramtanu Pandey aka Tansen: Rajput musician of Mughal court
- Shaurya Singh / Lokesh Batta as Todarmal
- Gopal Singh as Mahesh Das aka Birbal
- Sweety Walia as Mahesh Das's wife
- Neeru Singh as adult Mehtab: Sharifuddin and Bakshi Bano's daughter
  - Sumbul Touqeer as child Mehtab
- Shoaib Khan as child Haider
- Sheezan Khan as
  - Murad Mirza (son of Akbar)
  - Young Akbar
  - Ricky Patel as child Murad Mirza
- Gaurav Sharma as Daniyal Mirza: Ruksaar's son
  - Unknown as child Daniyal Mirza
- Kunal Khosla as Qutubuddin Koka
  - Unknown as child Qutub
- Angel Fernandes as child Aaram Bano
- Geet Sharma as Khanum
- Anurag Sharma as Maharana Pratap
- Ajay Paul Singh Andotra as Lakshman Das: Minister Amer
- Aryan Maheshwari as a palace official
- Riney Aryaa as Saira
- Manju Raizada as Hakima Sahiba: The royal healer
- Gaurrav Walia as Amaanullah Khan
- Ranvierr Chahal as Rashid Khan: Nadira/Anarkali's father
- Sammanika Singh as Zil Bahar: Nadira/Anarkali's mother
- Mohammed Saud Mansuri as child Qadir (2014)
- Amit Sehgal as Abu Fazal
- Rohit Joshi as Farhan: Salim's friend

=== Guest ===
- Naved Aslam as Bairam Khan: Rahim's father; Salima Sultan's late husband; Akbar's former mentor and caretaker
- Pranav Misshra as Mirza Muhammad Hakim: Humayun and Mah Chuchak's son
- Mita Vashisht as Mah Chuchak Begum: Empress of Kabul, Humayun's widow; Jalal's enemy
- Shilpa Raizada as Nigaar: Humayun and Chaand's daughter
- Neha Dandale as Chaand Begum: Nigaar's mother
- Gagan Kang as Abul Maali, Mah chuchak's Son-in-law
- Meghna Naidu as Benazir, Poison Maiden Vishakanya(Zehreeli Dosheeza) from Harem of Kabul
- Prince Singh as Raja Suryabhan, Jodhabai's ex fiancee
- Javed Pathan as Sheikh Gadai
- Harjeet Walia as Chugtai Khan: Official of Mughal Sultanate, King Bharmal's friend
- Sanjeev Jaiswal as King Achal Singh of Dhawalgarh, Sukanya's father in law
- Bobby Kumar as Etmaad Khan: a dancer (Kasim). He appeared in the episode of Sujamal's case about sending a letter to Jodha and he also witnessed with his own eyes that Atgah Khan was killed by Adham Khan. (2013)
- Ketan Karande as Khaibar Zaara
- Surbhi Sidhu as Sakeena/Atifa
- Gaurrav Walia as Amaan-ullaah khan
- Manish Bishla as Mirza Kasim
- Chetna Kaintura as Zeenat
- Shiv Mishra as priest at the temple while Jodha was praying for Qadir's recovery
- Munendra Singh Kushwah as Raja Khambar Singh: the king of an inland tribe
- Shiny Dixit as Bela: King Khambar's daughter
- Babita Anant as Kaushalya: villagers
- Vishnu Bholwani as Jagdev
- Abhilash Chaudhary as Raja Drumak
- Melanie Pais as Laboni, Witch
- Kamalika Guha Thakurta as Damyanti (Dammo): Laboni's Mother
- Kishan Bhan as Jogi Uday Nath: Taantrik

== Historical accuracy ==
Certain Hindu groups claimed Jodhaa was married to Akbar's son, Jahangir, and was a non-Rajput born to a low caste concubine. Individuals protested against the show along with Bharat Ka Veer Putra – Maharana Pratap, another historical series that aired on Sony TV.

The title of the series was criticised by members of the Kshatriya community as a misleading, politically motivated historical revision that minimised Rajput history. The community protested against the series in Rajasthan, and alleged that if the name was not changed, they would not allow any Balaji Telefilms productions to be released in the state. Ekta Kapoor stated, "I always believe it's 80% history and 20% folklore. There are enough proofs that say it's true, but then some people say it's not. Akbar had a certain graph and we know that. We cannot negate that he changed his heart from a power-hungry ruler to a non-biased one because of his queen."

== Production ==
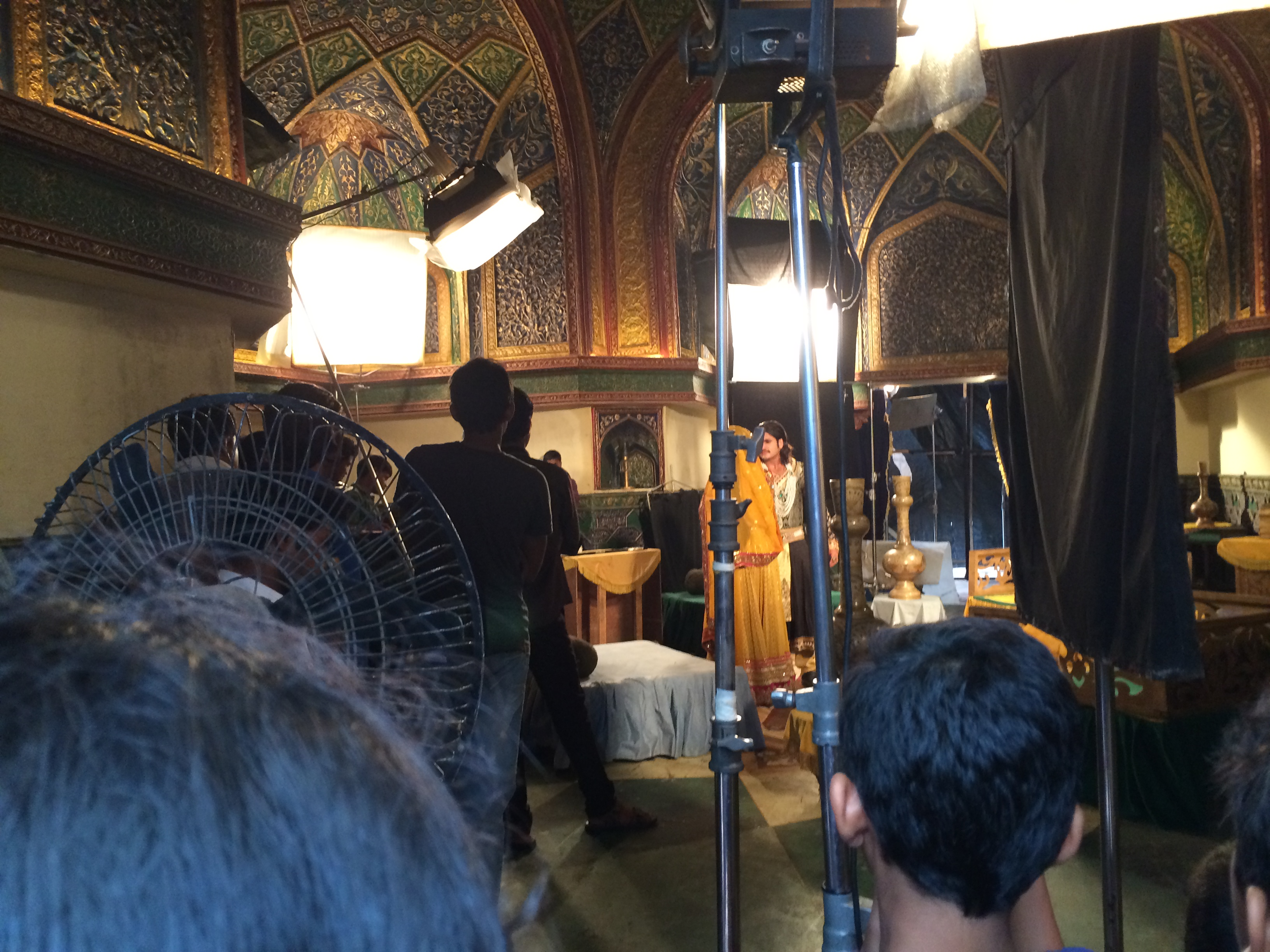
Rajat Tokas during the shooting of the Jodha Akbar at ND Studios, Karjat.

The producer of the show, Ekta Kapoor was influenced by the 2008 big screen movie, Jodhaa Akbar, directed by Bollywood's Ashutosh Gowariker.

Rajat Tokas who had earlier worked with Ekta Kapoor in the soap opera, Tere Liye was selected to play the role of the protagonist Akbar.

Ekta Kapoor stated she conducted 7000 auditions for the female protagonist Jodha across the nation before selecting Paridhi Sharma.

Ashwini Kalsekar was selected to play the role of Maham Anga, Akbar's primary caretaker and protector.

== Awards ==
| Year | Award | Category | Nominee | Result |
|---|---|---|---|---|
| 2013 | Indian Television Academy Awards | Best Historical/Mythological Show | Ekta Kapoor | Won |
| 2013 | Indian Television Academy Awards | Best Actor in Negative Role | Chetan Hansraj | Won |
| 2013 | Indian Television Academy Awards | Best Actress in Negative Role | Ashwini Kalsekar | Won |
| 2013 | Indian Television Academy Awards | Best Art Direction | Sandesh and Vishwanath | Won |
| 2013 | Indian Television Academy Awards | Best Costumes | Nidhi Yasha | Won |
| 2013 | Indian Television Academy Awards | Best Actor (Drama) | Rajat Tokas | Won |
| 2013 | BIG Star Entertainment Awards | BIG Star Most Entertaining TV Show (Fiction) | Ekta Kapoor | Won |
| 2013 | BIG Star Entertainment Awards | BIG Star Most Entertaining TV Actor | Rajat Tokas | Won |
| 2014 | Star Guild Awards | Best Historical Series | Ekta Kapoor | Won |
| 2014 | Star Guild Awards | Best Director (Fiction) | Santram Verma | Won |
| 2014 | Star Guild Awards | Best Actor in Leading Role | Rajat Tokas | Won |
| 2014 | 7th Boroplus Gold Awards | Best Actress in Negative Role (Critics) | Ashwini Kalsekar | Won |
| 2014 | 7th Boroplus Gold Awards | Best Actor in Negative Role (Critics) | Chetan Hansraj | Won |
| 2014 | 7th Boroplus Gold Awards | Best Actress in Supporting Role (Critics) | Lavina Tandon | Won |
| 2014 | 7th Boroplus Gold Awards | Golden Debutante of the year(Female) | Paridhi Sharma | Won |
| 2014 | 7th Boroplus Gold Awards | Best Actor in a Lead Role (Critics) | Rajat Tokas | Won |
| 2014 | 7th Boroplus Gold Awards | Best Television Show of the Year (Fiction) | Ekta Kapoor | Won |
| 2014 | Indian Telly Awards | Best Actress in Negative Role | Ashwini Kalsekar | Won |
| 2014 | Indian Telly Awards | Best Fresh New Face (Female) | Paridhi Sharma | Won |
| 2014 | Indian Telly Awards | Best Actor in a Lead Role | Rajat Tokas | Won |
| 2014 | Indian Telly Awards | Best Ensemble Cast | Ekta Kapoor | Won |
| 2014 | Indian Telly Awards | Best Historical Series | Ekta Kapoor | Won |
| 2015 | Star Guild Awards | Best Ongoing Drama Series | Ekta Kapoor | Won |
