= Mirza Aziz Koka =

Mughal court noble (c. 1542 – c. 1624)

Kokaltash Mirza Aziz Koka Khan-i-Azam
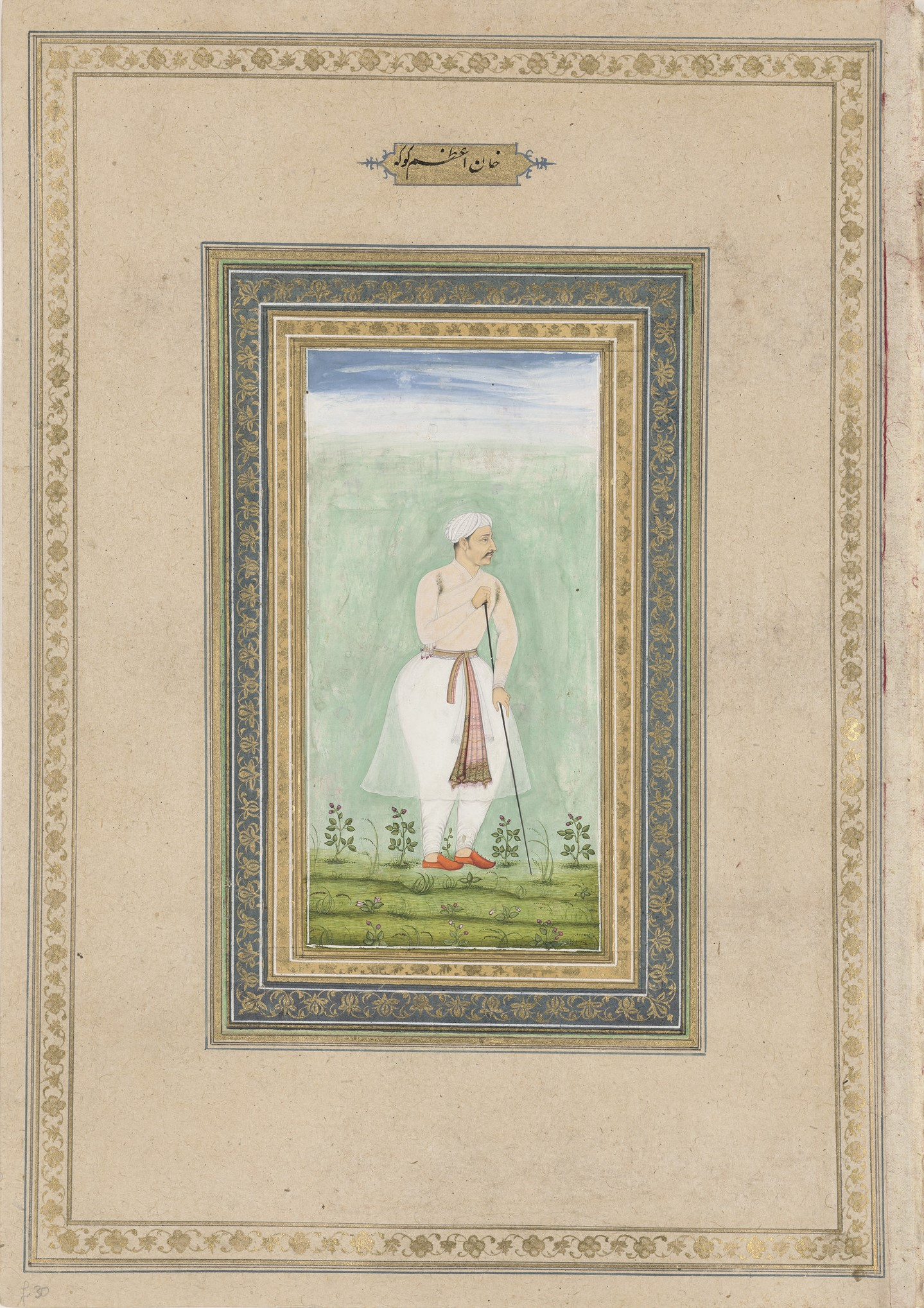
- A miniature of Mirza Aziz Koka, c. 1610–1620

4th Subahdar of Bengal
- In office 6 April 1582 – 18 May 1583
- Monarch: Akbar
- Preceded by: Ismail Quli
- Succeeded by: Mir Jumla I

Personal details
- Born: 1542
- Died: 1624 (aged 81–82); Agra Fort, Agra, Mughal Empire,
- Resting place: Chausath Khamba, Delhi
- Children: Mirza Shamsi Jahangir Quli Khan; Mirza Shadman Shadi Khan; Mirza Khurram Kamal Khan; Mirza Abdullah Sardar Khan; Mirza Anwar; Mirza Addul Latif; Mirza Murtaza; Mirza Abdul Ghafur; Six daughters
- Parent(s): Ataga Khan (father); Jiji Anga (mother)

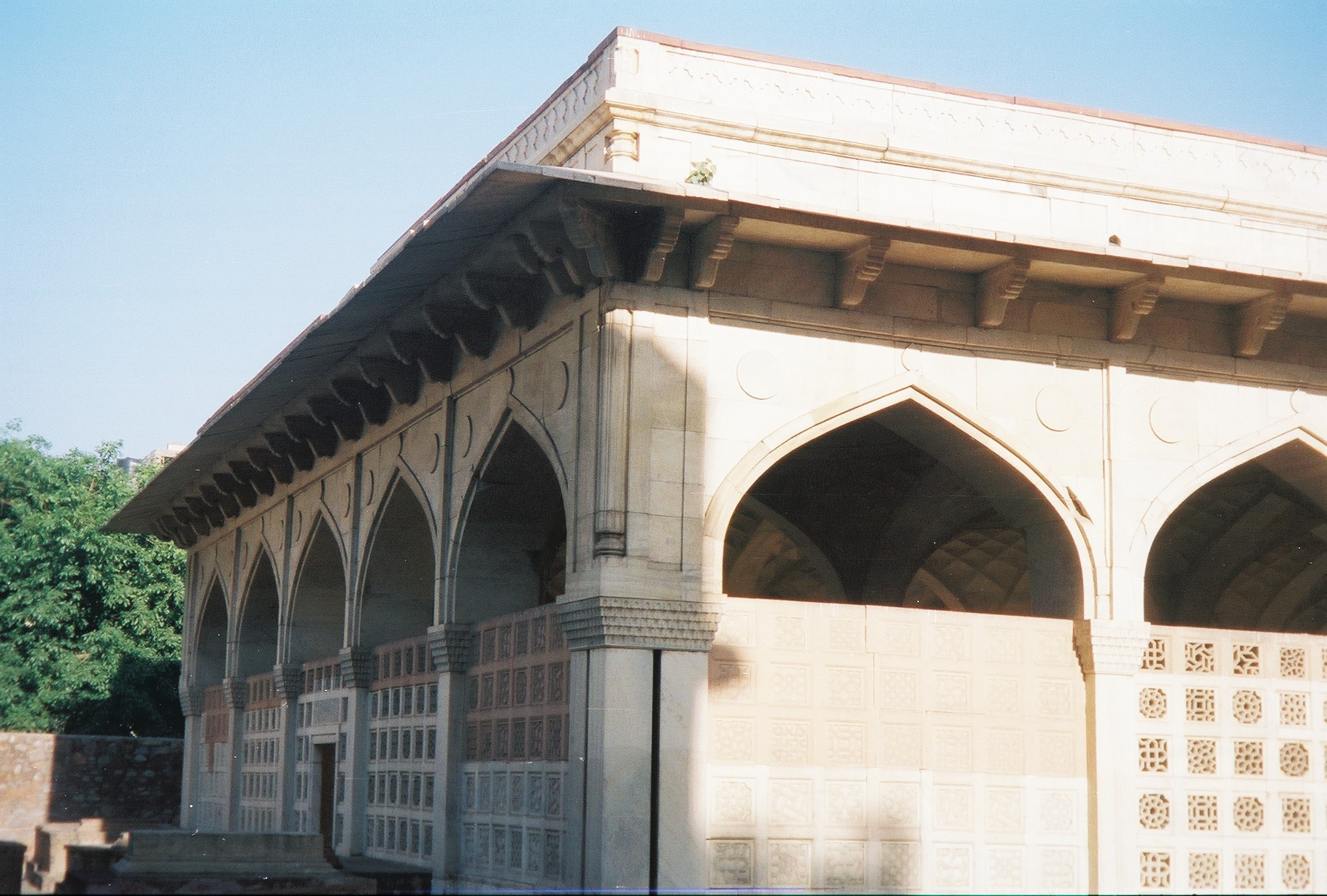
The Chausath Khamba, tomb of Aziz Koka

Mirza Aziz Koka ( c. 1542 – c. 1624), also known as Kokaltash and by his sobriquet Khan-i-Azam (The Greatest Khan), was the foster brother of Akbar, who remained one of the leading nobles at the courts of the Mughal emperors Akbar and Jahangir. He was also the Subahdar, governor of the Subah (province) of Gujarat.

== Biography ==
=== Early life ===
He was the son of Shams ud-Din Ataga Khan, the Prime Minister of Akbar, and Akbar's wet-nurse, Jiji Anga, hence his Turkic sobriquet "Koka" or "foster-brother". Ataga Khan was murdered by Adham Khan, the jealous son of Maham Anga, another of Akbar's wet-nurses, in 1562. Thereafter, Aziz Koka built his father's tomb next to Nizamuddin Auliya in Delhi in 1566–67. Adham Khan, on the other hand, was executed on the orders of Akbar.

After Akbar conquered Gujarat, he made Aziz Koka the governor of the new province. In 1573, the Gujaratis rebelled and besieged Aziz Koka in Ahmedabad. But he defended the city until Akbar's army came to his relief. In 1579, he was made governor of Bihar and ordered to quell a rebellion in Bengal. However, he did not take action until the next year, when the rebels began to take Bihar as well. He was similarly reluctant when ordered to conquests in the Deccan in 1586.

Akbar was very lenient to Aziz Koka, his foster-brother and childhood playmate. Nevertheless, Aziz Koka did not obey Akbar, his emperor, readily. He was especially opposed to Akbar's law to brand all horses, and could not accept prostration in Akbar's new court ritual. When Aziz Koka was summoned to court in 1592, he went on pilgrimage to Mecca instead with his six sons, Khurram, Anwar, Abdullah, Abdul Latif, Murtaza, Abd Al Ghafur, his six daughters, their mothers and one hundred servants, leaving his older sons, Shamsi and Shadman in India. There he spent much money on pious causes for a year and a half, until Akbar forgave him, and restored him in his positions.

=== Later life ===
During the rule of Jahangir, however, he lost many positions, as he along with Raja Man Singh I supported the rebellion of the eldest son of Prince Salim, Khusrau Mirza, who was Akbar's choice for his successor and had his rank raised above his father Salim by Akbar. Khusrau's rebellion was crushed in 1606. He was first blinded and then imprisoned. Jahangir in retaliation took away much of their powers, and chided them in the Jahangirnama. Aziz Koka was so much devoted to the cause of Khusrau that he is recorded to have repeatedly declared:

"I am willing that they (the fate) should convey the good news of his (Khusrau's) sovereignty to my right ear and should seize my soul from my left ear."

Later in life, Mirza Aziz Koka regained his position, but his clan could never regain the royal patronage, as they enjoyed during his father's lifetime.

Aziz Koka had many children. One of his daughter was married to the Khusrau Mirza. Another of his daughters, Habiba Banu Begum was married to the fourth son of Akbar, Mughal prince Sultan Murad Mirza in 1587; and had two sons, Rustam Mirza (b. 1588) and Alam Mirza (b. 1590). His oldest son, Mirza Shamshi, entitled Jahangir Quli Khan, served as the governor of Junagadh. Jahangir Quli's son, Bahram, established the settlement of Behrampura in Gujarat.

Another son of Khan Azam was Mirza Shadman, who in Jahangir's time received the title of Shadi Khan. Another was Mirza Khurram, who in Akbar's reign was governor of Junagarh in Gujarat, which was his father's fief. In Jahangir's time he became known as Kamal Khan and was appointed to accompany Prince Khurram (Shah Jahan). Another son of his was Abdullah who in Jahangir's time received the title of Sirdar Khan. The emperor had imprisoned him in the fort of Gwalior along with his father. Yet another son, Anwar was married to the daughter of Zain Khan Koka.

He built his tomb, Chausath Khamba, literally 64 pillars, during 1623–24, near the Nizamuddin Dargah shrine complex in Delhi.

== Bibliography ==
- Munis D. Faruqui (27 August 2012). The Princes of the Mughal Empire, 1504–1719. Cambridge University Press. ISBN 978-1-107-02217-1.
- Sarkar, Jadunath, ed. (1943). The History of Bengal. Vol. II: Muslim Period. Delhi: B.R. Publishing Corporation. ISBN 81-7646-239-X.
