= Hazir Jawab Birbal =

- Genre: Sitcom Drama
- Written by: Arshad Syed
- Directed by: Amit Damle
- Creative director: Vanshika Sharma
- Country of origin: India
- Original language: Hindi
- No. of episodes: 40

Production
- Executive producer: Rahul Sharma
- Producers: Nikhil Sinha; Sohanna Sinha
- Editor: Sanket Parkar
- Camera setup: Multi-camera
- Running time: Approx. 23 minutes
- Production company: Triangle Film Company

Original release
- Network: BIG Magic
- Release: 17 August – 15 October 2015

Hazir Jawab Birbal is an Indian sitcom television series which premiered on 17 August 2015 on BIG Magic replacing the sitcom Akbar Birbal. The series is produced by Triangle Films Productions. It stars Saurabh Raj Jain as Emperor Akbar and Gaurav Khanna as Birbal in the main lead.

== Plot synopsis ==
A strong central character, Birbal acts as an agent of change as identified with today's world, targeting outcomes and transparency in governance issues. He is a strong central character who believes in democratic views and rights. Birbal is also Akbar's biggest ally, critic, friend and philosopher, who encourages and guides him in his decision making.

== Cast ==
=== Main cast ===
- Saurabh Raj Jain as Emperor Akbar
- Gaurav Khanna as Birbal
- Rimpi Das as Noor Ji
- Vishavpreet Kaur as Maham Anga
- Shoma Anand as Maham Anga
- Vikas Khoker as Adham Khan (Son of Maham Anga)
- Aishwarya Sakhuja as Fake Jalpari
- Pawan Singh as Ibne
- Sumit Arora as Batuta
- Yashkant Sharma as Raja Darban

=== Special appearance ===
- Anup Soni
- Aman Verma as Mohanlal (Episode 40)
