= Tomb of Adham Khan =

16th-century tomb of a general of Emperor Akbar

Coordinates: 28°31′24.44″N 77°10′56.13″E

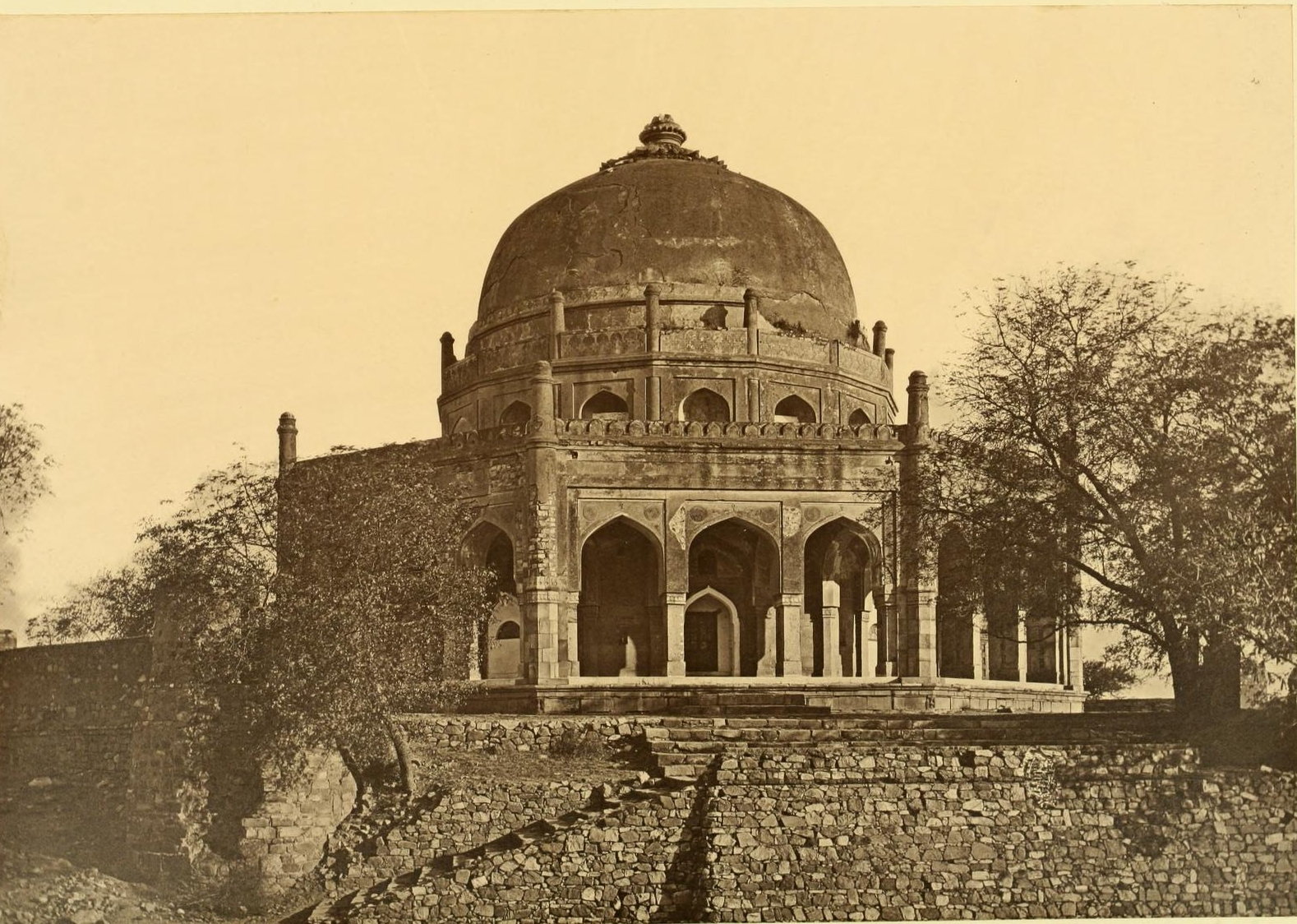
The tomb photographed in 1872

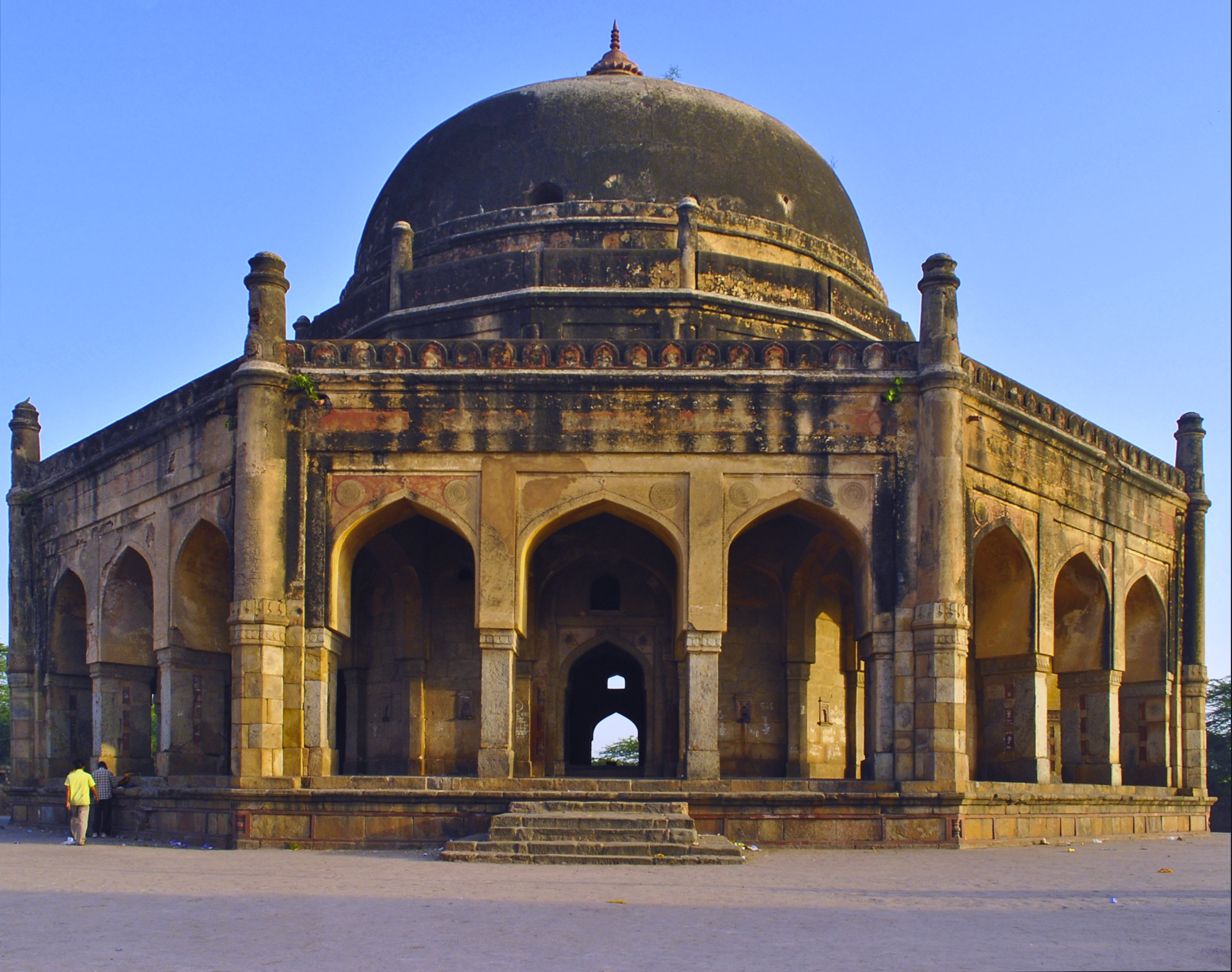
Adham Khan's tomb, which also houses the grave of his mother, Maham Anga, Mehrauli, Delhi.

Adham Khan's Tomb is the 16th-century tomb of Adham Khan, a general of the Mughal Emperor Akbar. He was the younger son of Maham Anga, Akbar's wet nurse thus also his foster brother. Out of jealousy and court intrigue, in May 1562 Adham Khan murdered Akbar's favourite general Ataga Khan, in the courtyard of the Diwan-e-Aam (the hall of audience), in Agra Fort . An enraged Akbar immediately ordered Adham's execution by defenestration from the ramparts of the Agra Fort.

The tomb was built in 1562, and lies to the South-West of the Qutub Minar, Mehrauli, Delhi, immediately before one reaches the town of Mehrauli. it is now a protected monument by Archaeological Survey of India. The tomb is opposite Mehrauli bus terminus and many passengers use it as a place to wait.

== Architecture ==
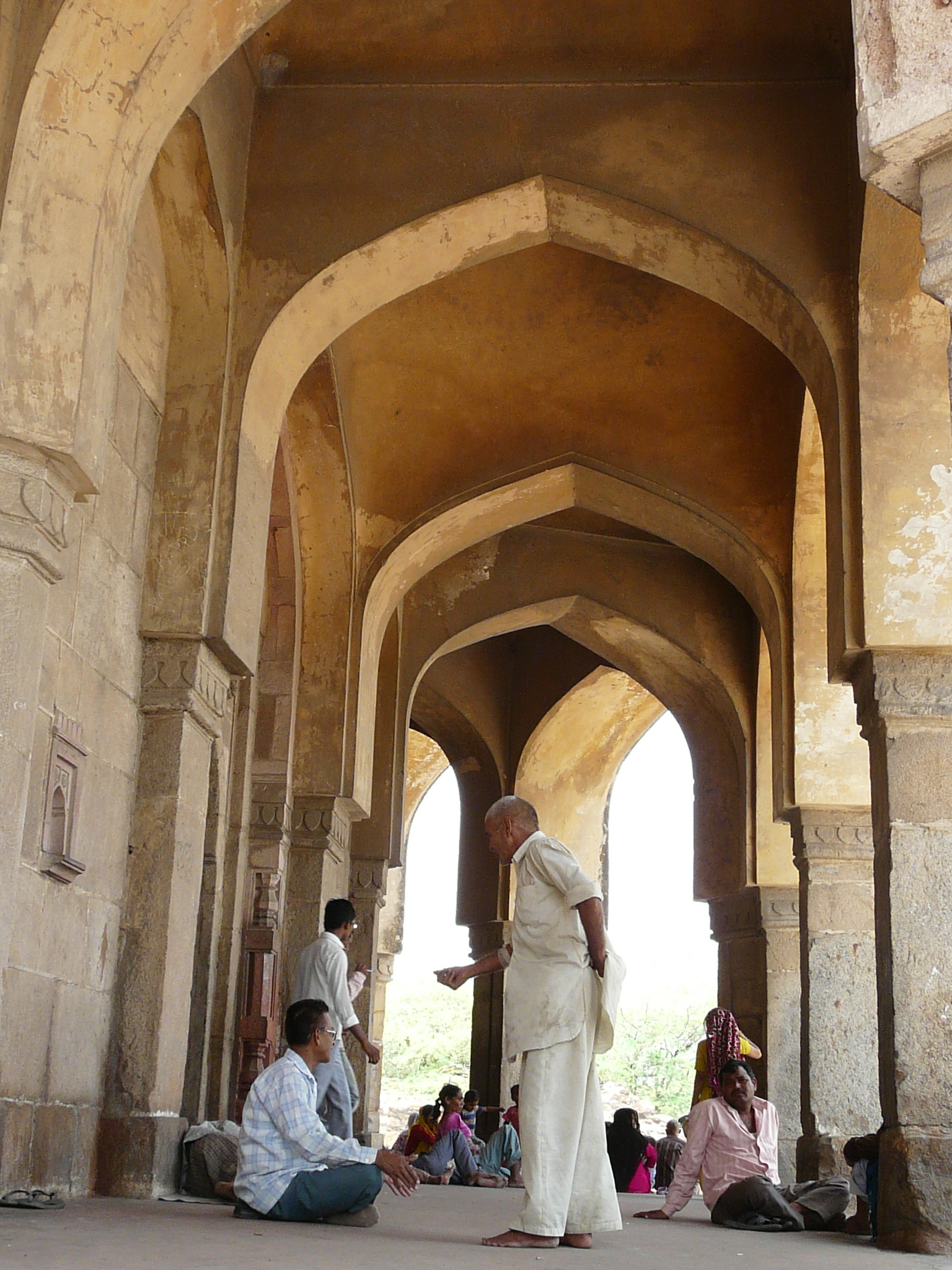
Adham Khan's tomb, surrounding archway, Mehrauli

It lies on the walls of Lal Kot and rising from a terrace enclosed by an octagonal wall provided with low towers at the corners. It consists of a domed octagonal chamber in the Lodi dynasty and Sayyid dynasty style of early 14th century. It has a verandah on each side pierced by three openings. It is known popularly as Bul-bulaiyan (a Labyrinth or Maze), for a visitor often loses his way amidst the several passages in the thickness of its walls.

== History ==
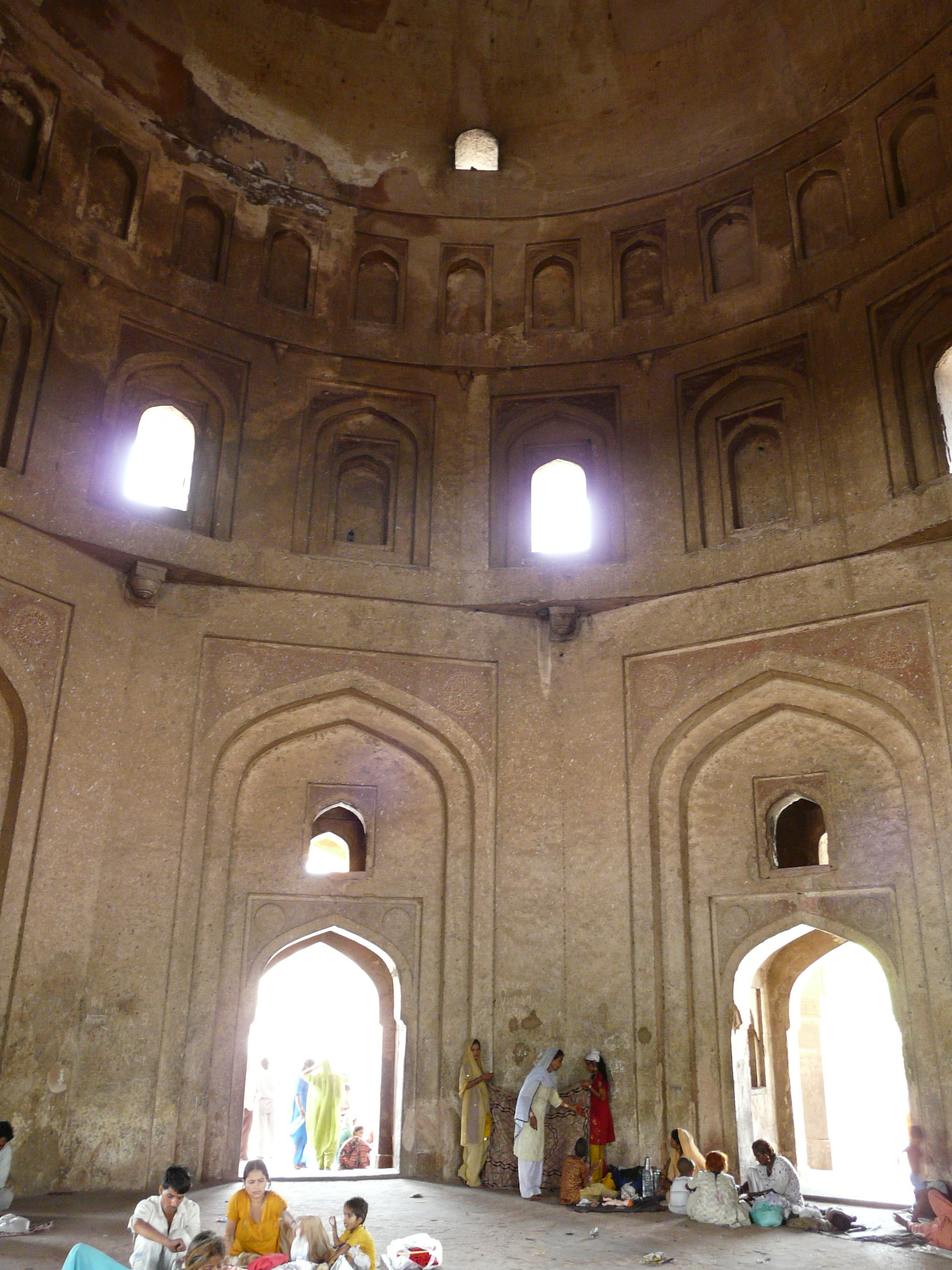
The interior of Adham Khan's tomb in Mehrauli, Delhi

Adham Khan, son of Maham Anga, a wet nurse of Akbar, was a nobleman and general in Akbar's army. In 1561, he fell out with Ataga Khan, Akbar's Prime Minister and husband of Jiji Anga, another of Akbar's wet nurses, and killed him, whereupon he was thrown down from the ramparts of Agra Fort twice, by the order of the emperor Akbar and died.

His mother after fortieth day of mourning also died out of grief, and both were buried in this tomb believed to be commissioned and built by Akbar, in a conspicuous octagonal design not seen in any Mughal building of that era; a design perhaps designated to the traitors, as it was the common design and features visible in the tombs of the previous Sur dynasty, and also the Lodi dynasty now within the present Lodi Gardens (Delhi), which the Mughals considered traitors.

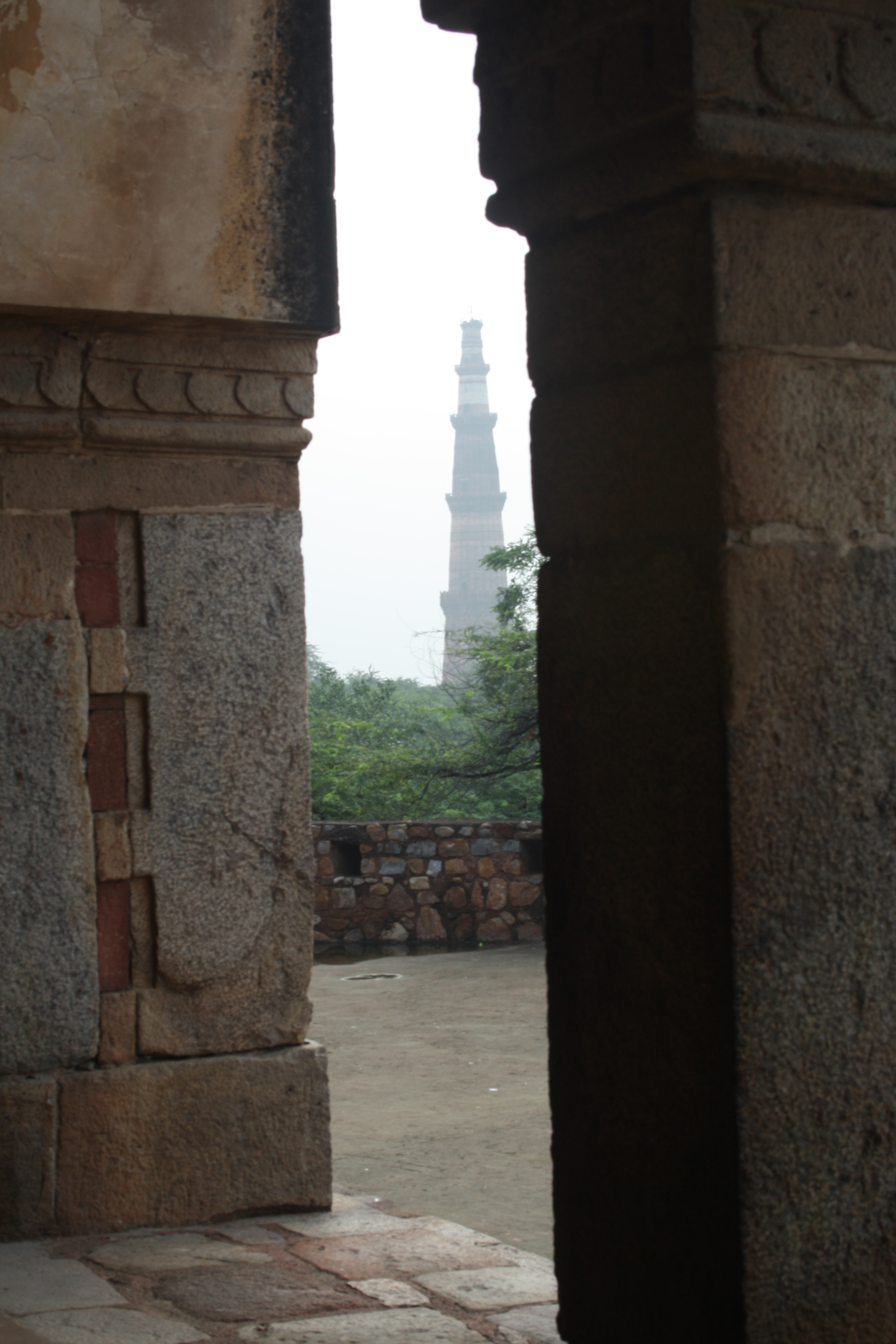
Qutub Minar as seen from Adham Khan's tomb

In the 1830s, a British officer named Blake, of the Bengal Civil Service, converted this tomb into his residential apartment and removed the graves to make way for his dining hall. Though the officer died soon, it continued to be used as a rest house for many years by the British, and at one point even as a police station and a post office. The tomb was vacated and later restored by the orders of Lord Curzon, and the grave of Adham Khan has since been restored to the site, and lies right below the central dome, though that of his mother Maham Anga never was.
