= Chausath Khamba =

Tomb in Delhi, India

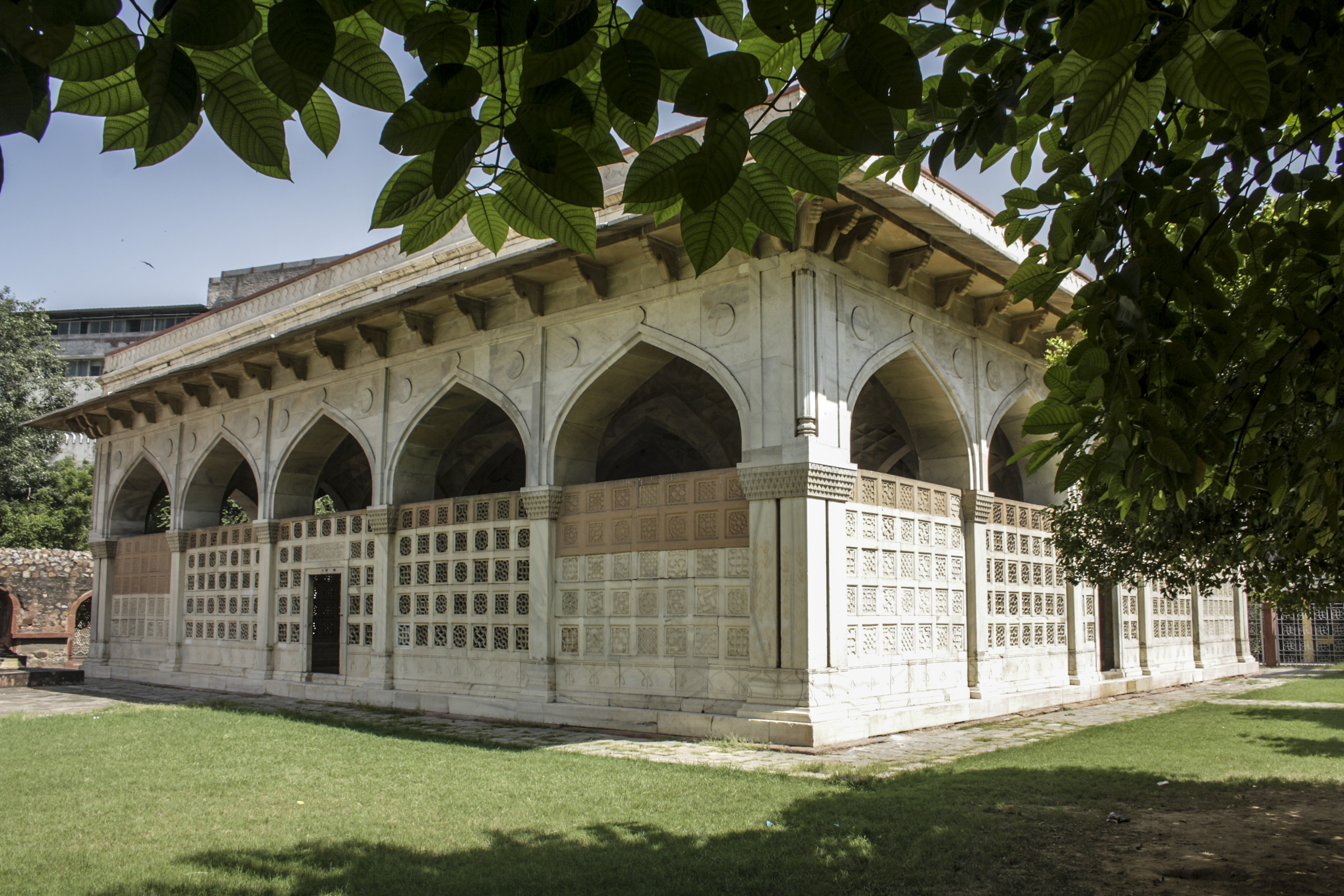
- View of Chausath Khamba

Religion
- Affiliation: Islam
- District: Delhi
- Province: Delhi
- Ecclesiastical or organisational status: Tomb
- Leadership: Jahangir
- Year consecrated: 1624

Location
- Location: Delhi, India
- Interactive map of Chausath Khamba
- Territory: Delhi
- Coordinates: 28°35′28.7″N 77°14′30.5″E

Architecture
- Architect: Koka Khan-i-Azam
- Type: Tomb
- Style: Mughal architecture
- Completed: 1623

Specifications
- Direction of façade: Open on four sides
- Dome: 25
- Materials: Marble

Chausath Khamba, also spelled Chaunsath Khamba, is a tomb built during 1623–24. It is located in Nizamuddin precincts of Sufi Muslim shrines and tombs in Delhi, India. The name means "64 pillars" in Urdu and Hindi. It was built by Mirza Aziz Koka, son of Ataga Khan, as a mausoleum for himself, at the time when Mughal Emperor Jahangir ruled from Delhi. Mirza Aziz Koka had served several times as Jahangir’s Governor of Gujarat before he died in Gujarat.

== Structure ==
Chausath Khamba monument was initially built as a hall in an innovative eclectic architectural style of the Mughal period. It was later converted into a tomb. It is a square structure constructed entirely of white marble. The structure (pictured with facades) has 64 columns that support twenty five bays. Each bay supports a dome. The domes are not visible externally since they are reverse domes (picture). The roof is flat. Each wall has five arches that are held by square pilasters. In each face, between each of five pilasters, marble trellised screens have been fixed.

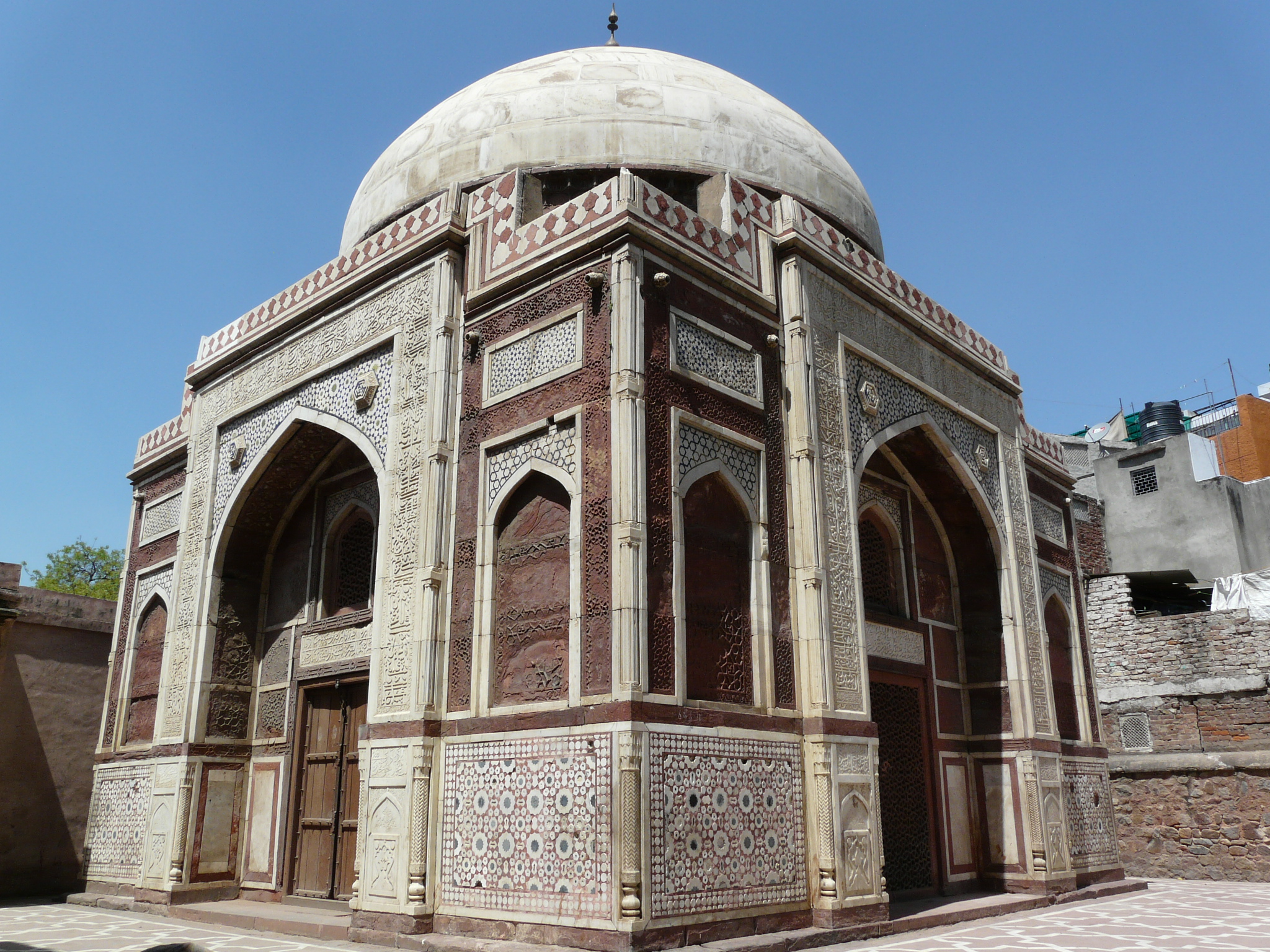
Ataga Khan’s Tomb near Chausath Khamba

According to inscriptions, the structure houses the tomb of Mirza Aziz Koka (also named Kotaltash). The tomb of his father, Ataga Khan, the Prime Minister of Akbar, is also in the vicinity. In addition, there are several other unidentified tombs inside this monument. It is considered the family shrine of Atgah Khan. The structure is enclosed and has an imposing entrance gate. The Ghalib tomb is located adjoining this structure on the northern side. Comparison is drawn to a similar tomb built in marble in Sarkhej in Gujarat where Mirza Aziz Koka served several times as Jahangir’s Governor of Gujarat. He died in Sarkhej and was temporarily buried there. His remains were later shifted to Chausath Khamba.

== Heritage status ==
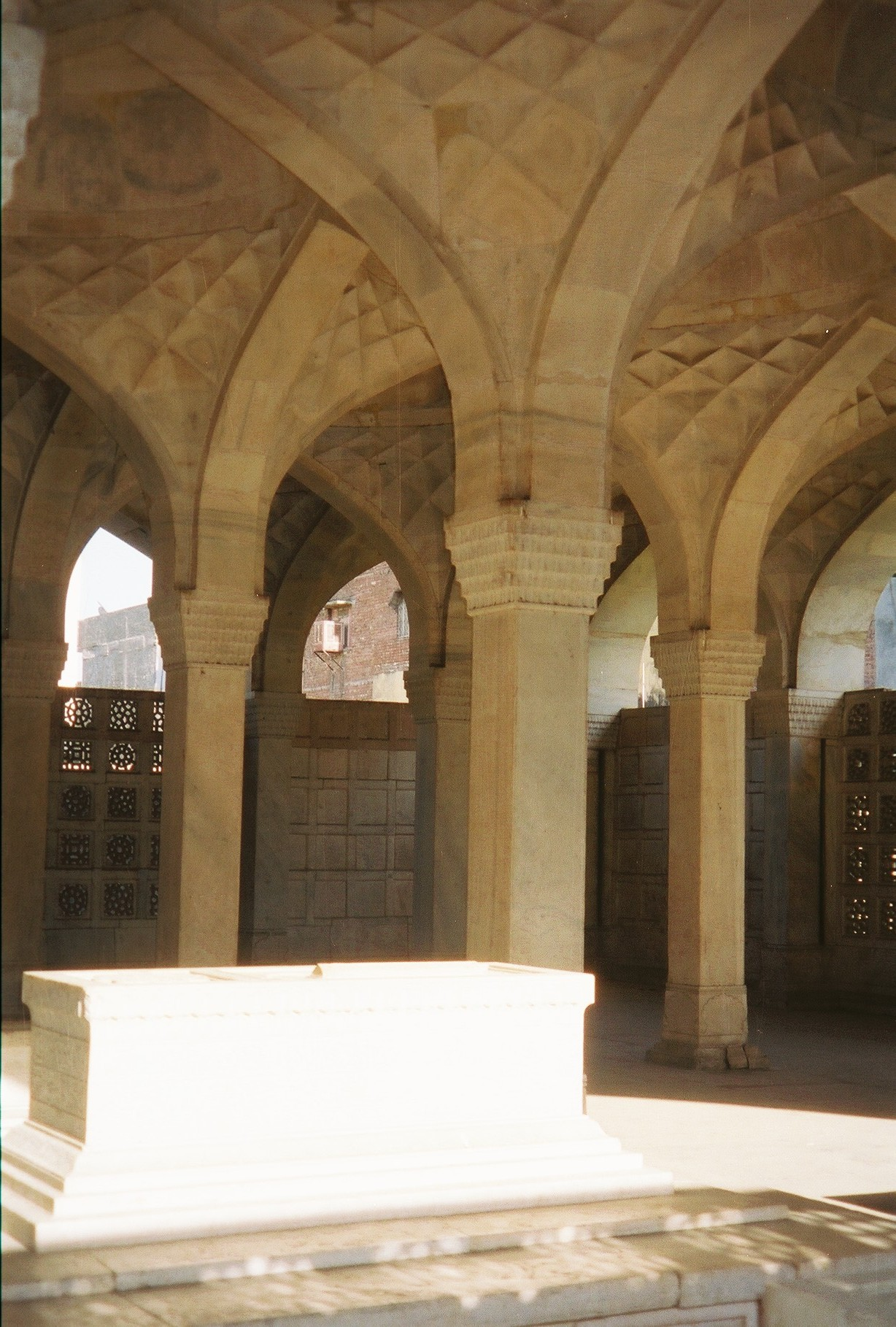
Marble pavilion with mausoleum of Mirza Aziz Koka inside the Chausath Khamba

The Chausath Khamba is located in the busy 14th century market area of Nizamuddin Basti in Delhi. The shrine of the Sufi saint Nizamuddin Auliya (1236 AD – 1325 AD) is nearby. The monument is part of the Nizamuddin religious complex and has been declared a heritage building. The forecourt of Chaunsath Khamba was recently landscaped by the Aga Khan Trust. The successful Sufi qawwali music of Jashn-E-Khusrau, in which performers from India and Pakistan performed, was held here in March 2010.

== Other structures ==
There are two other structures adjoining the Chausath Khamba, which are also heritage monuments.

Urs Mahal

Located in front of the Chausath Khamba, Urs Mahal is an assembly hall (pictured in the gallery) where Khawwali programmes are held on festival days and on the days during "Urs of Sufi saint Nizamuddin Auliya". It is a protected monument (refurbished in 2003).

Mirza Ghalib’s tomb

Mirza Ghalib's tomb is a small tomb of famous Urdu poet Mirza Ghalib (1797–1869), who was renowned in Urdu and Persian poetry during the Mughal period. It is a protected monument. The tomb is a work of art located north of the enclosure of the Chausath Khamba.
