= Ataga Khan =

Mughal noble and general (died 1562)

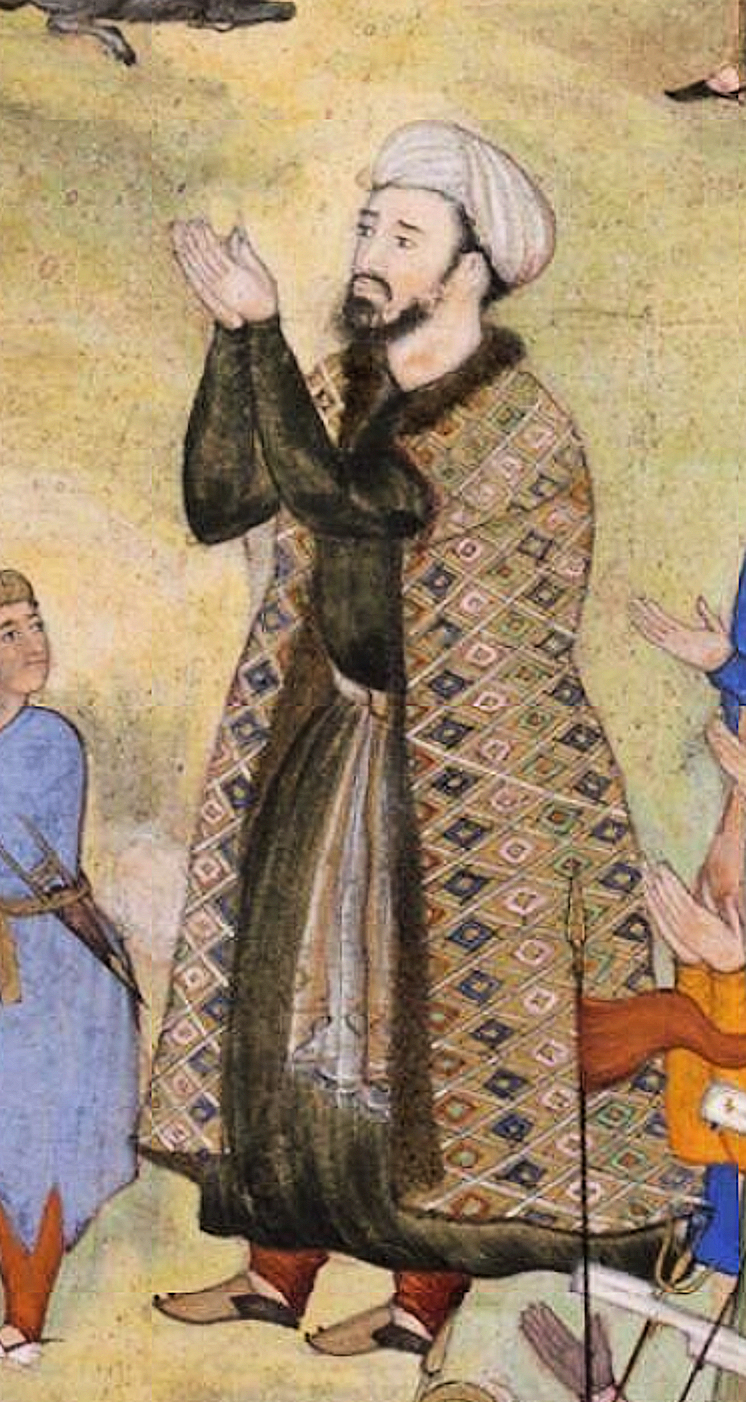

Vakil-i-Mutlaq of the Mughal Empire
- In office November 1561 – 16 May 1562
- Monarch: Akbar
- Preceded by: Munim Khan

Personal details
- Died: 16 May 1562 Diwan-e-Aam, Agra Fort, Agra, Mughal Empire

Shams ud-Din Ataga Khan (died 16 May 1562) was a prominent figure in the court of the Mughal emperor Akbar.

He held important positions in Akbar's court, including that of wakil (advisor or minister), to which he was appointed in November 1561, much to the displeasure of Maham Anga, another prominent advisor, whose son, Adham Khan, murdered him in 1562. Ataga Khan was the husband of Jiji Anga, one of Akbar's wet nurses.

== Service under Humayun ==
Shams-ud-din was the son of Mir Yar Muhammad of Ghazni, a simple farmer, and started life as a soldier in Kamran Mirza’s army. He saved Humayun from drowning in the Ganges. As a reward, Humayun took him into his personal service and his wife Jiji became one of Akbar's foster-mothers. She was called foster-mother (Anagah) and her husband Shamsuddin was designated foster-father (Atgah). He also received the title of Khan and his biological son, Aziz became Akbar's foster or milk-brother (Kokah). In 1545, he accompanied Akbar to Kabul alongside Jiji and Aziz.

== Service under Akbar ==
In 1560, when Akbar relieved his regent Bairam Khan of his duties and instructed him to go to Makkah for Hajj (pilgrimage), he was goaded by his political opponents to rebel. Bairam marched upon Jalandhar, intent on taking Lahore. Akbar sent Shams-ud-din with the vanguard of the Mughal army to halt or at least slow down Bairam 's advance. Shams-ud-din managed to block Bairam Khan's advance near the village of Gunecur, near Jalandhar. He tried to negotiate with Bairam, to no avail. After a fierce, heavily contested battle, Shams-ud-din triumphed and Bairam was forced to retreat. For his victory, Shams-ud-din was hailed as a hero and received lavish gifts, including robes of honour, standards and kettledrums that had once belonged to Bairam. Later, Bairam surrendered to Akbar and was pardoned and chose to continue his journey to Makkah; en route he was assassinated by a group of Afghans due to their leader's personal vendetta.

In 1561, Akbar dismissed Munim Khan as Vakil and appointed Shams-ud-din in his stead. Shams-ud-din would prove to be a competent and loyal administrator.

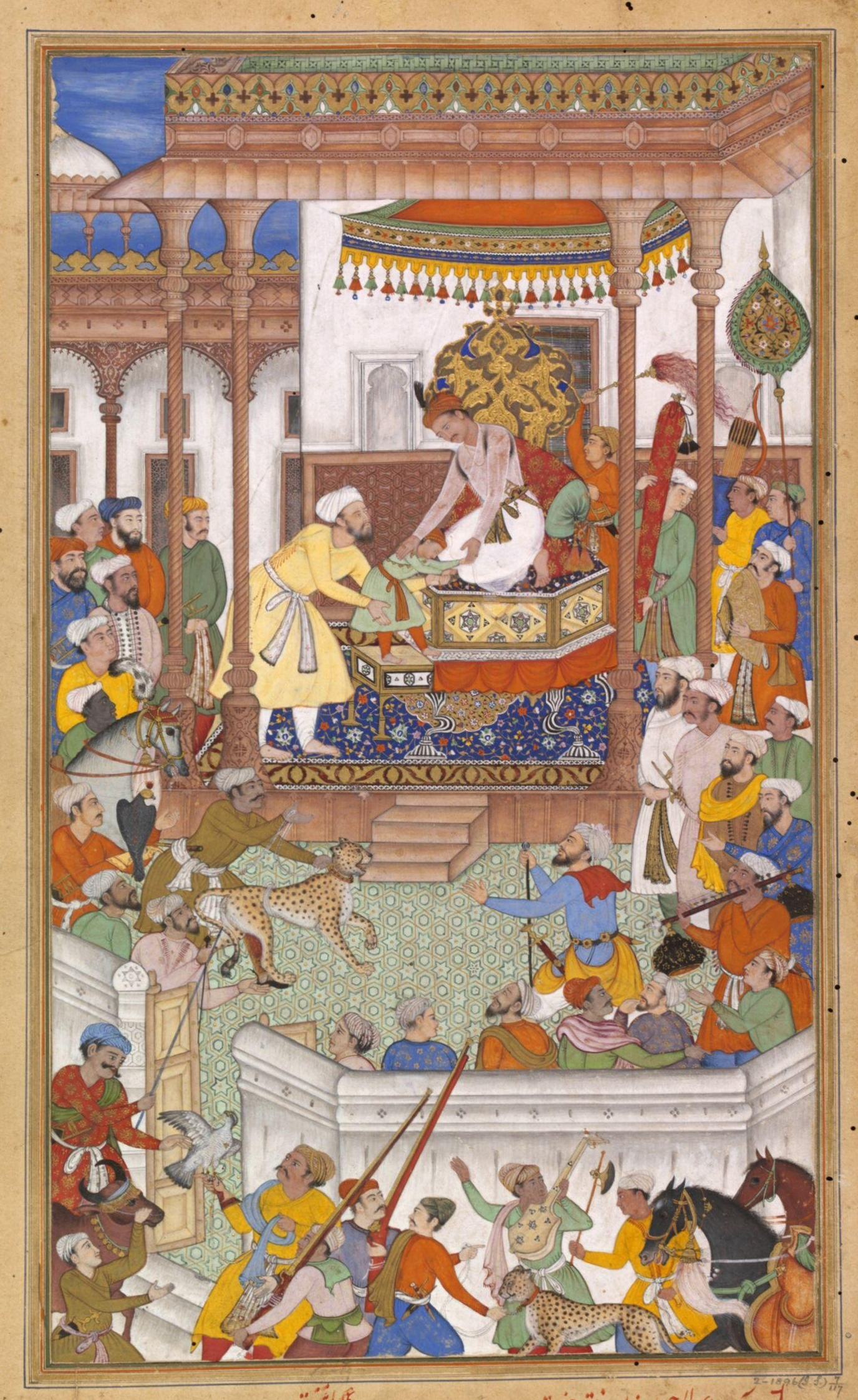
Young Abdul Rahim Khan-I-Khana being received by Akbar, being helped by Ataga Khan, Akbarnama, c. 1590–95

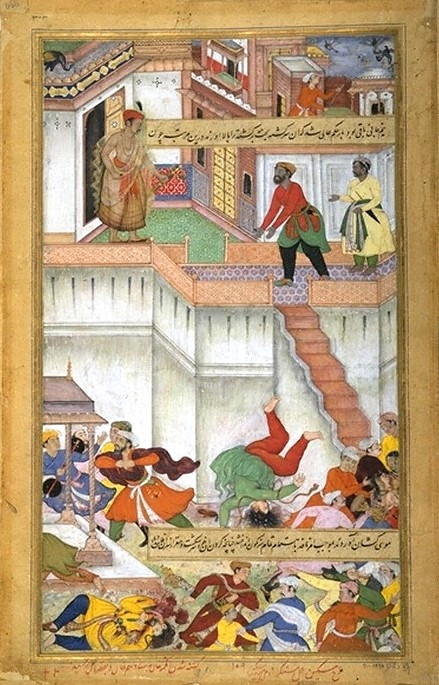
Akbar orders punishment of Adham Khan for murdering Ataga Khan, by throwing him twice down the terrace. Akbarnama, c. 1590–95

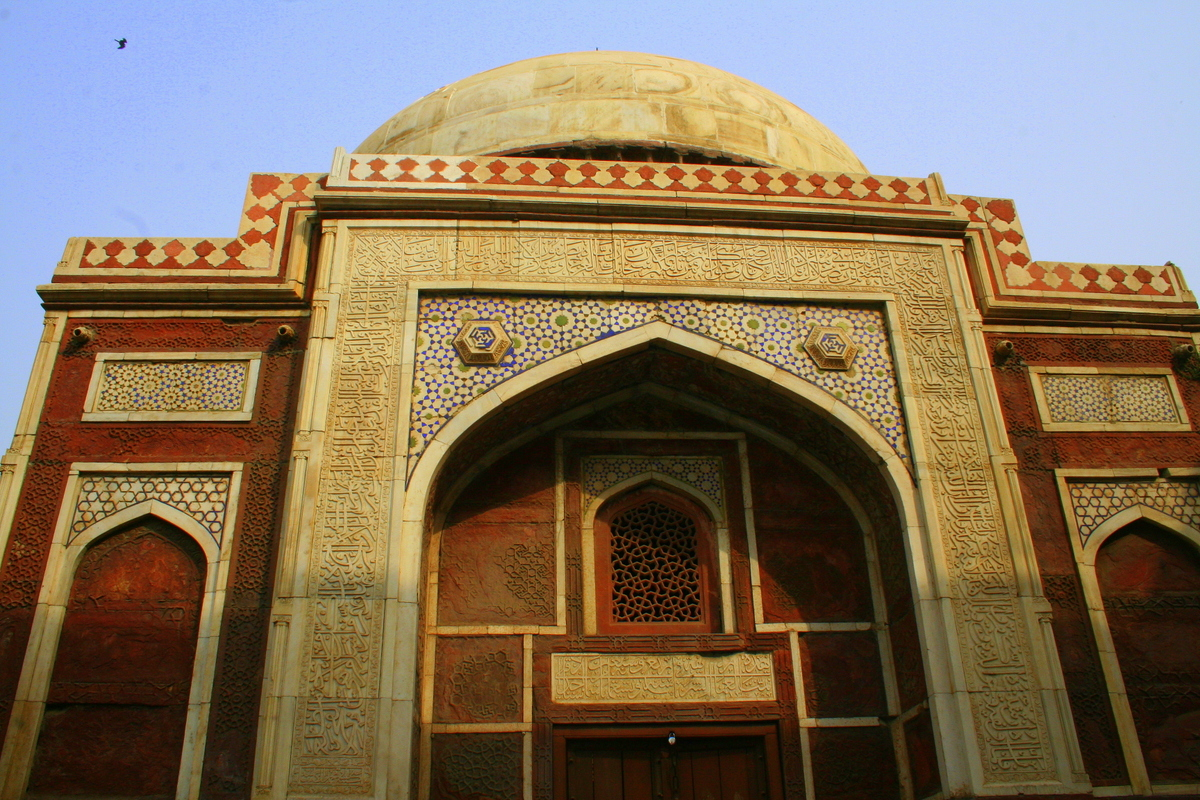
Atgah Khan Tomb as seen from Dargah

== Death ==
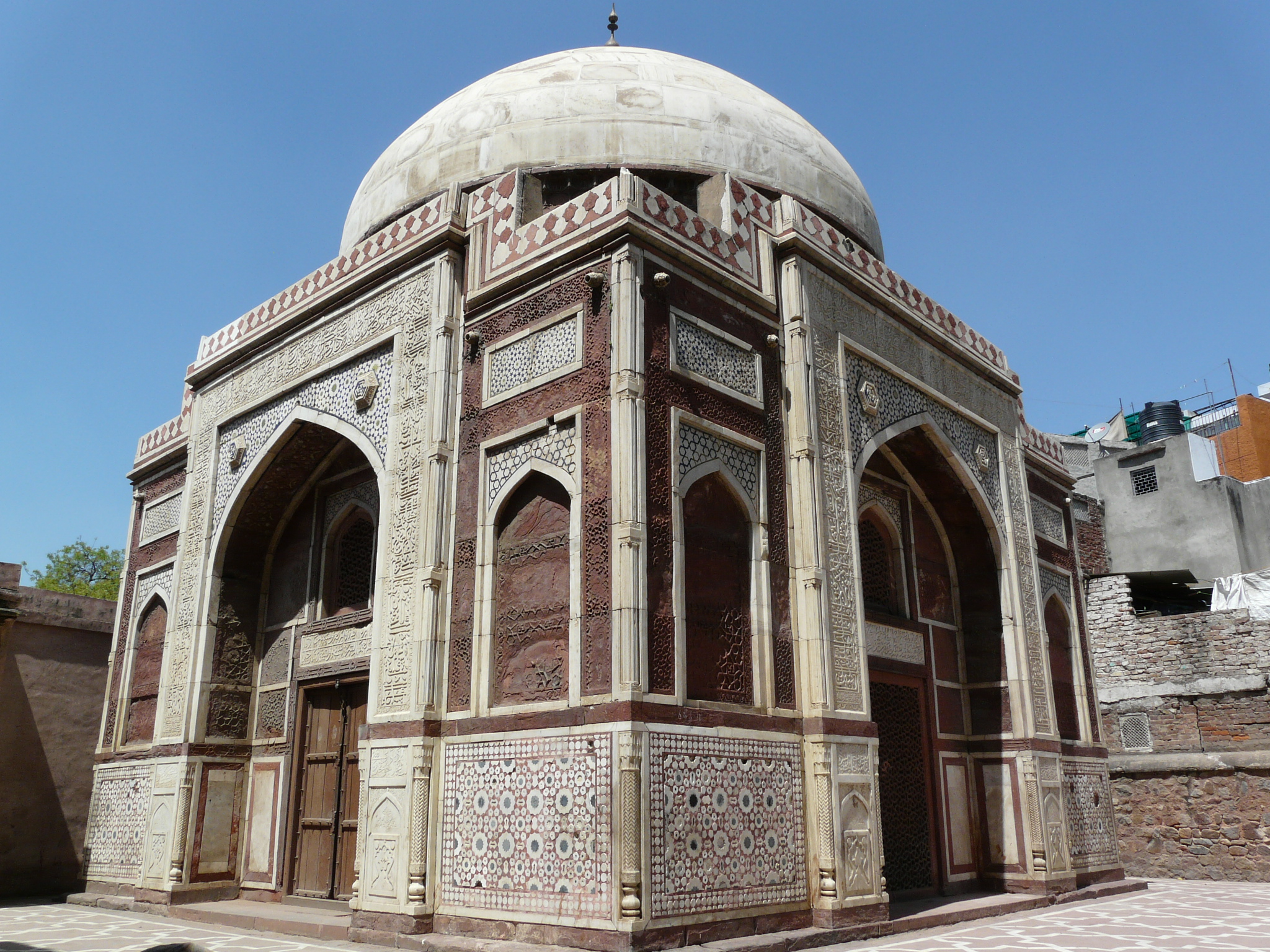
Ataga Khan's Tomb near Chausath Khamba in Nizamuddin West

On 16 May 1562 Adham Khan accompanied by a few ruffians burst in upon Ataga Khan as he sat in the Diwan-e-Aam, the hall of audience, in Agra Fort, and murdered him, in the courtyard of the Diwan-e-Aam. Hearing of this murder, an enraged Akbar ordered Adham Khan to be defenestrated from the ramparts of the fort. The fall only broke Adham Khan's legs, so the still angry emperor ordered that he be thrown down again. The second fall killed Adham Khan instantly.

After the death of Ataga Khan, his tomb was built by the instructions of Mughal emperor Akbar and built by his foster brother, Mirza Aziz Koka, in 1566–67. It is situated on the northern edge of Nizamuddin, most known for the dargah of 13th century Sufi saint Nizamuddin Auliya. Its architect was Ustad Khuda Quli and calligrapher Baqi Muhammad Khan from Bukhara, who added Quranic verses on the white marble slabs, inlaid on the red sandstone exterior walls, which were suitably chosen reflecting his mode of death, considered a martyrdom by Mughal historian, Abul Fazal. An inscription on the southern door of the tomb mentions that it was finished in 974 AH (1566–67).
