= Haider Khan =

Haider Khan may refer to:

- Haider Khan (athlete), Pakistani shot putter and discus thrower
- Haider Khan (photographer), photographer and director in the Indian film industry
- Haider Khan (Pakistani politician), member of the Gilgit Baltistan Assembly
- Haider Ali Khan, Pakistani politician, member of the National Assembly of Pakistan
- Haider A. Khan, professor of economics
- Asif Ali Haider Khan, Indian playwright, director and actor, receipient of the Ustad Bismillah Khan Yuva Puraskar and the Sangeet Natak Akademi Award for theatre; appearances in films and TV include Delhi Crime, Poacher, Amal and Dhurandhar
