= Maham Anga =

Foster mother of the Mughal emperor Akbar

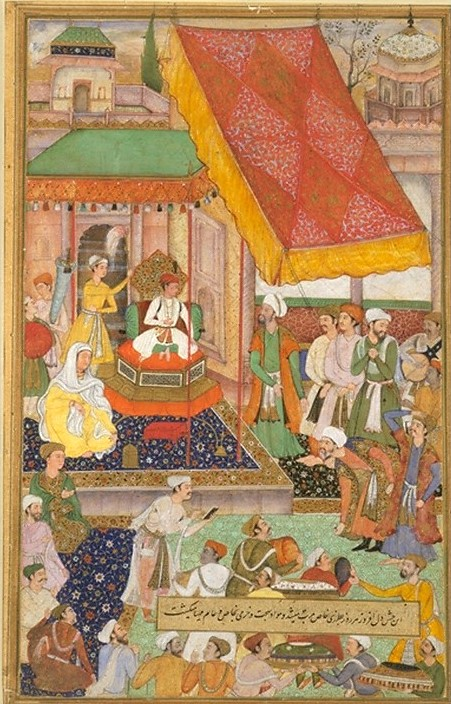
- Being seated just below Akbar himself denotes Maham Anga's position in the imperial court
- Died: 25 June 1562; Agra, India
- Burial place: Adham Khan's Tomb, Delhi
- Spouse: Nadim Khan
- Children: Adham Khan; Quli Khan

Maham Anga (died 25 June 1562) was the foster mother and chief wet nurse of the Mughal emperor Akbar. She was the political adviser of the teenage emperor and the de facto regent of the Mughal Empire from 1560 to 1562.

== Biography ==
Maham Anga was Akbar's chief nurse prior to his enthronement at age of thirteen as Mughal emperor in 1556. Her own son, Adham Khan, as Akbar's foster brother, was almost regarded as one of the imperial family. Maham Anga, believed to be shrewd and ambitious, and very much in charge of the household and harem, sought to advance her own authority and that of her son. In 1559, the two tricked Akbar into coming to India without his regent and guardian Bairam Khan and were able to convince Akbar that now that he was seventeen, he did not need Bairam. Akbar dismissed his regent and sent him on a pilgrimage to Mecca. Months later, Bairam was murdered by an Afghan, and much of the former's power passed on to Maham Anga.

== Death ==
Adham Khan's violent execution for the murder of Shams-ud-Din Ataga Khan, Akbar's favourite general, at the hands of the young Emperor himself no less, in May 1562, profoundly affected her. She famously commented You have done well to Akbar when he broke the news to her and died shortly afterwards.

Her tomb and that of her son, known as Adham Khan's Tomb, was built by Akbar, and popularly named Bhul-bulaiyan, owing to the labyrinth in its structure, lies north of the Qutub Minar in Mehrauli.

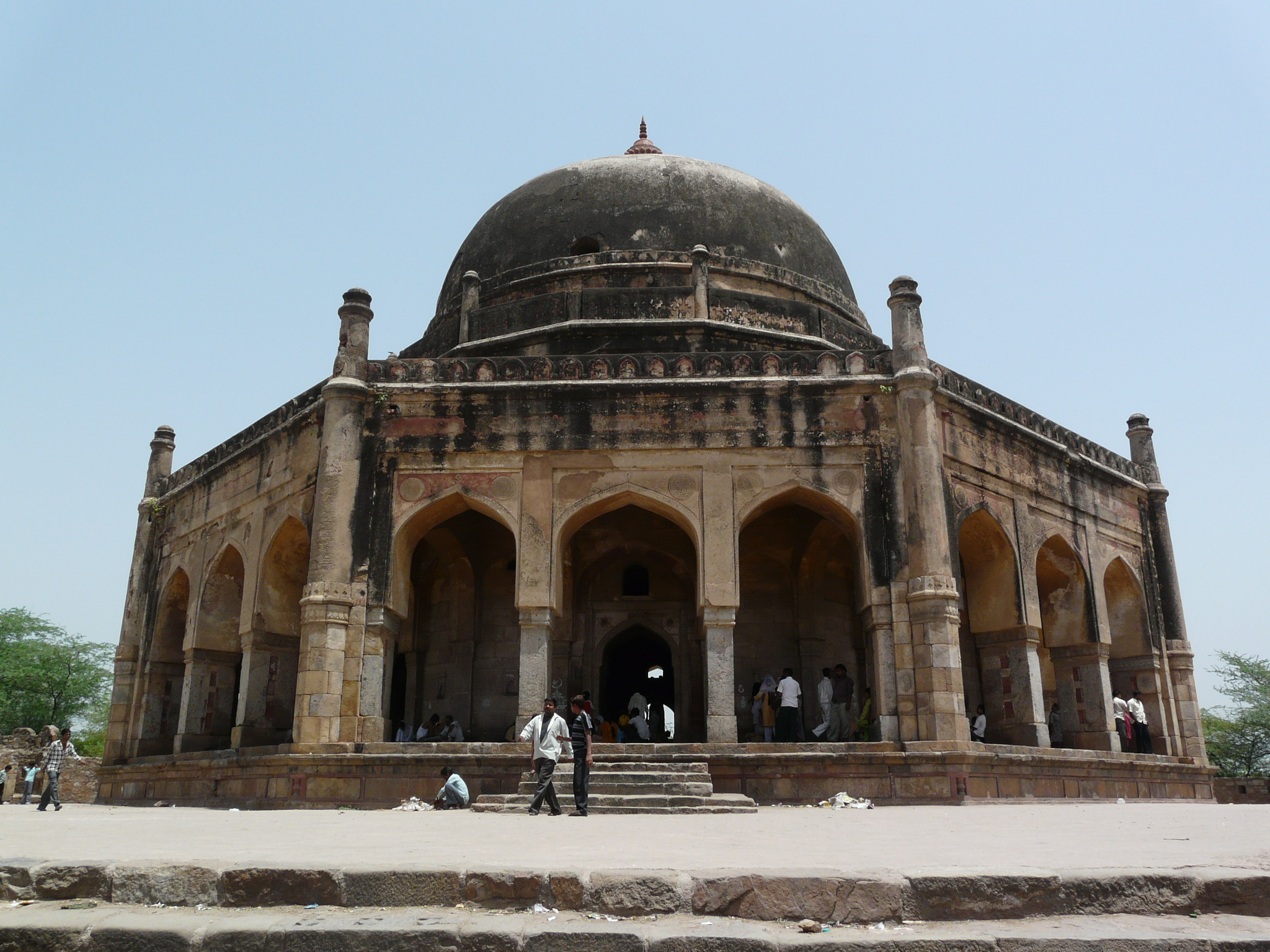
Adham Khan's Tomb, which also serves as his mother, Maham Anga's tomb, Mehrauli, Delhi.

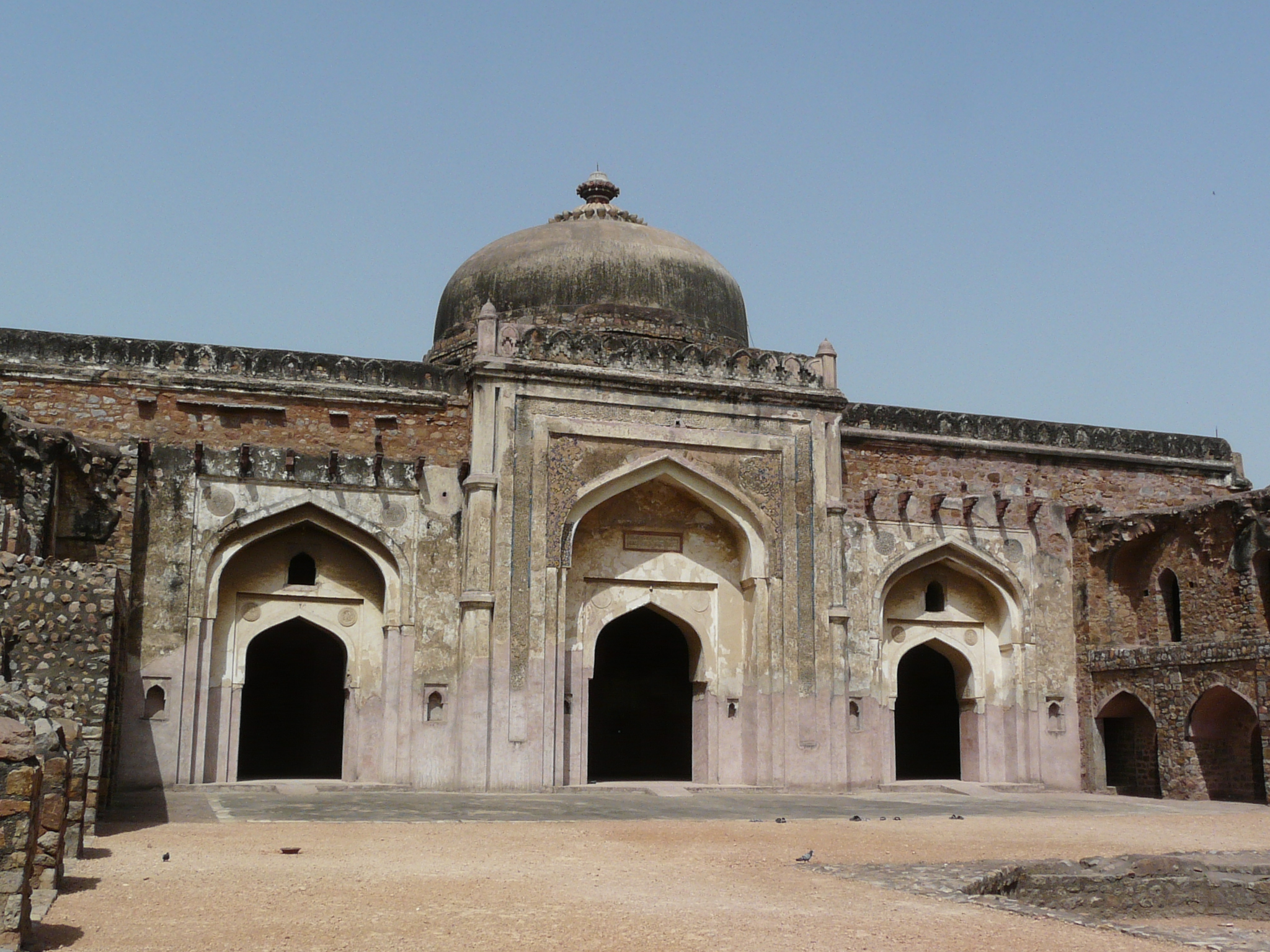
Khairul Manazil, a mosque opposite Purana Qila, Delhi, built by Maham Anga

== Khairul Manazil ==
She also built a mosque, Khairul Manazil, in 1561 CE along the lines of Mughal architecture. It later served as a Madrasah, and now stands opposite Purana Qila, Delhi on Mathura Road, south east to Sher Shah Gate.

It was her slave that tried to assassinate Akbar, after his return from hunting and moving towards Nizamuddin Dargah, but the arrow hit a soldier in his entourage instead, who was hurt, not a lot, and he did not suffer heavy wounds.

== In popular culture ==
- Ila Arun portrayed as fictionalized Maham Anga in the Bollywood film Jodhaa Akbar (2008).
- A fictionalized Maham Anga was portrayed by Ashwini Kalsekar in Jodha Akbar.
- Tiya Gandwani portrayed Maham Anga in BIG Magic's 2015 sitcom, Hazir Jawab Birbal.
- Jaya Bhattacharya portrayed Maham Anga in Bharat Ka Veer Putra - Maharana Pratap.
- Hetal Yadav portrayed Maham Anga in Akbar Rakht Se Takht Ka Safar in 2017 Indian drama television series tracing Akbar's journey to the Mughal throne.
