= Hazrat Nizamuddin Dargah =

Dargah (mausoleum) of the Sufi saint Nizamuddin Auliya

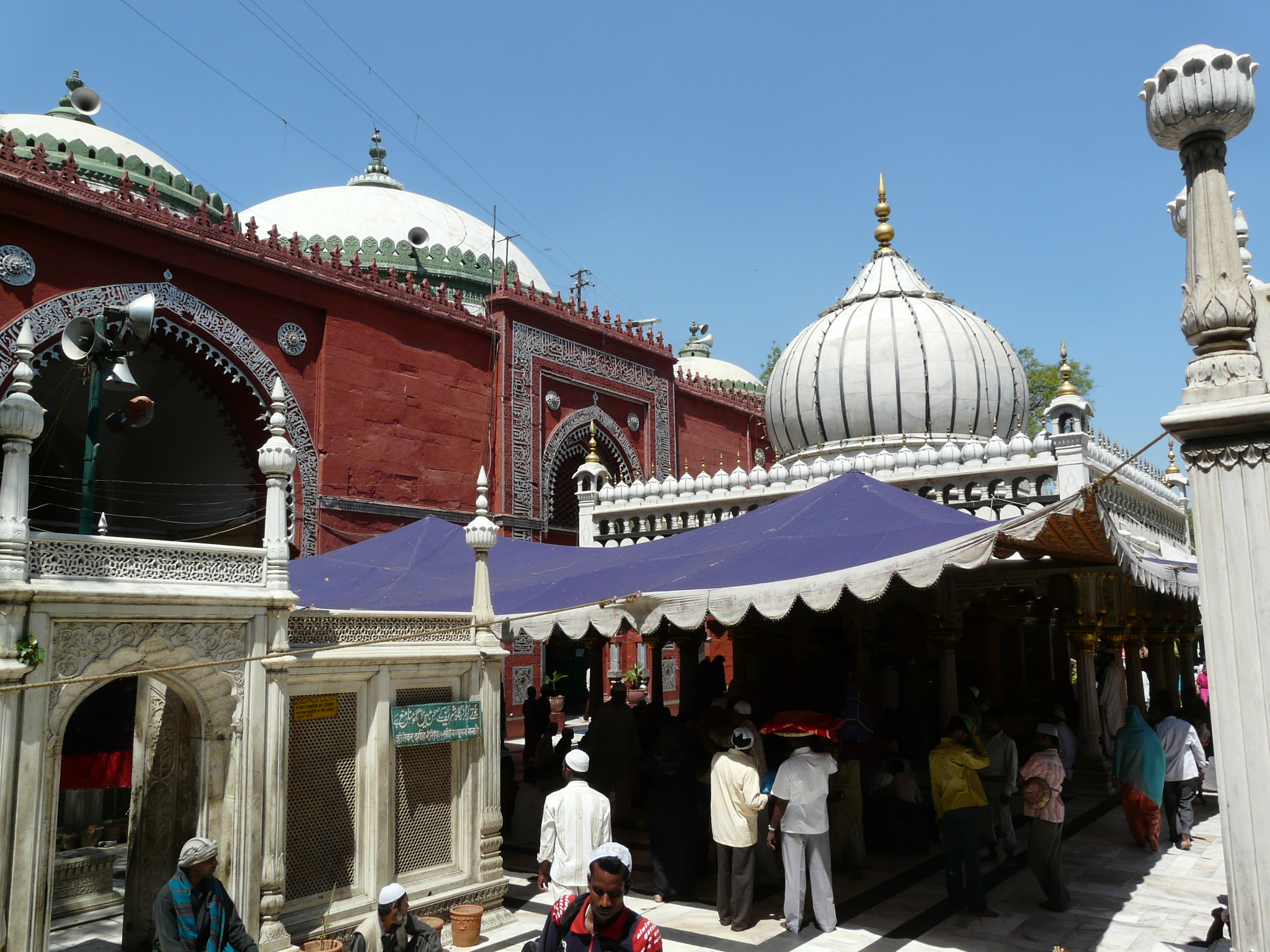
- Amir Khusrau's tomb (left), Nizamuddin Dargah (right) and Jamaat Khana Masjid (background)

- Location of the dargah and mosque complex in South East Delhi

Religion
- Affiliation: Sunni Islam
- Sect: Sufism
- Festival: Urs (17th–18th of Rabi' al-awwal)
- Ecclesiastical or organisational status: Dargah and mosque
- Ownership: Delhi Waqf Board
- Status: Active

Location
- Location: Amir Khusro Gate, Nizamuddin West, South East Delhi, Delhi NCT
- Country: India
- Coordinates: 28°35′29″N 77°14′31″E

Architecture
- Architect: Sunni Khilji
- Type: Mosque architecture
- Style: Indo-Islamic; Mughal
- Completed: 1325 (dargah and mosque); 1562 (dargah dome)

Specifications
- Direction of façade: West
- Dome: Many (unqualified number)
- Shrine: One
- Materials: Red sandstone

Website
- nizamuddinaulia.org

Monument of National Importance
- Official name: Baoli at Ghiaspur (also known as Nizamuddin Baoli)
- Reference no.: N-DL-54

Monument of National Importance
- Official name: Tomb of Amir Khusro, Ghiaspur
- Reference no.: N-DL-56

Monument of National Importance
- Official name: Tomb of Nizamuddin Auliya, Ghiaspur No. 197
- Reference no.: N-DL-58

Monument of National Importance
- Official name: Grave of Jahanara Begum
- Reference no.: N-DL-124

Monument of National Importance
- Official name: Grave of Mohammed Shah
- Reference no.: N-DL-125

The Hazrat Nizamuddin Dargah is the dargah and mosque complex of the Sufi saint Nizamuddin Auliya, located in the Nizamuddin West area of Delhi, India. The dargah, or mausoleum, is a Sufi shrine and is visited by thousands of pilgrims every week. The site is also known for its evening qawwali devotional music sessions.

The complex comprises the Hazrat Nizamuddin Dargah, including several tombs, the Jamat Khana Masjid (or Khilji Mosque), and a baoli. Many of the structures are Monuments of National Importance, administered by the Archaeological Survey of India.

== Architecture ==
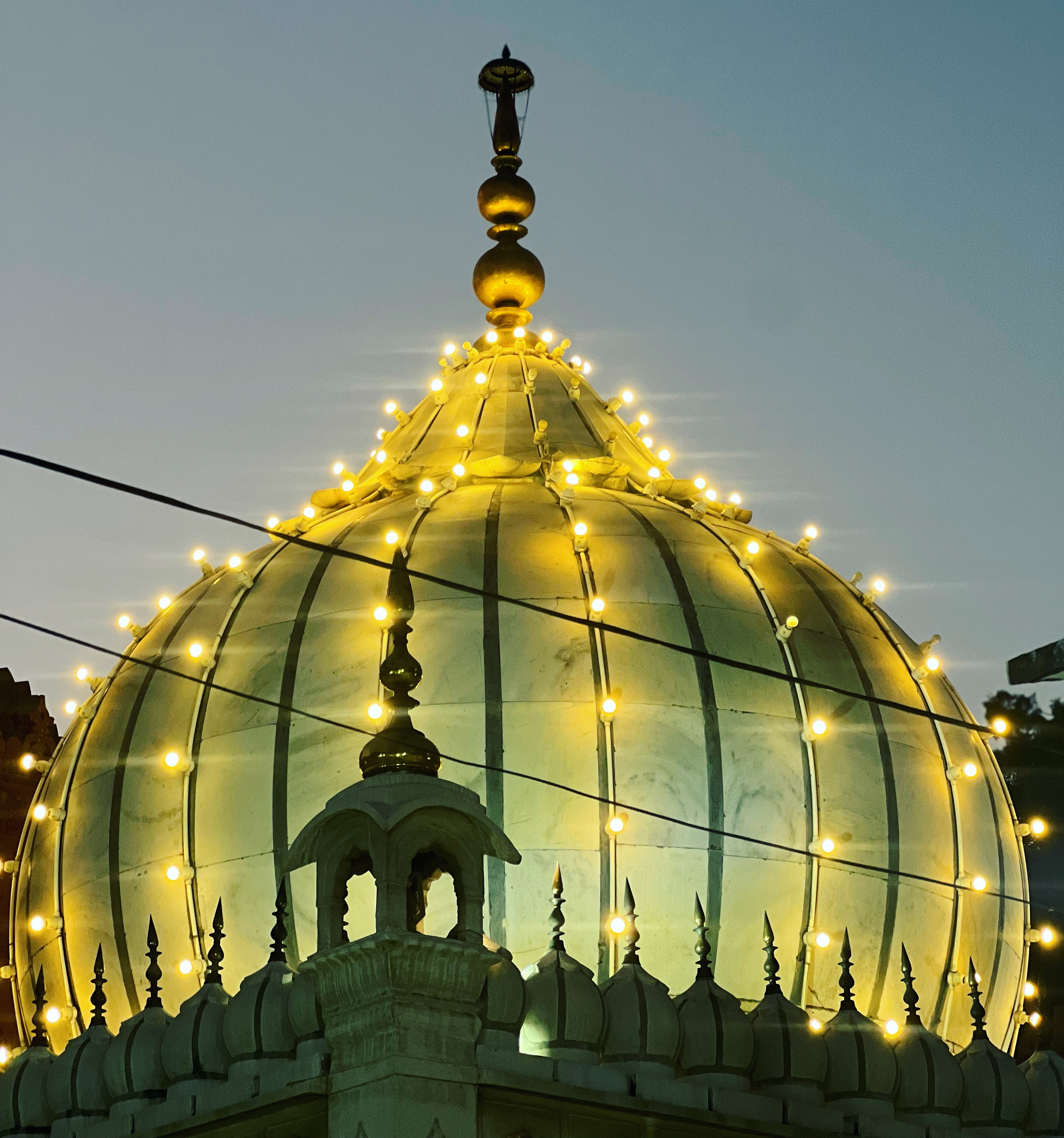
Dome of Dargah Sharif

The tombs of Amir Khusrau, Nizamuddin's disciple, and Jehan Ara Begum, Shah Jahan's daughter, are located at the entrance to the complex. Ziauddin Barani and Muhammad Shah are also buried here. Overall, the dargah complex has more than 70 graves.

The complex was renovated and restored in c. 2010 by the Aga Khan Trust for Culture.

=== Dargah ===
Nizamuddin's tomb has a white dome. The main structure was built by Muhammad bin Tughluq in 1325, following Nizamuddin's death. Firuz Shah Tughlaq later repaired the structure and suspended four golden cups from the dome's recesses. Nawab Khurshid Jah of Hyderabad's legendary Paigah Family gifted the marble balustrade that surrounds the grave. The present dome was built by Faridun Khan in 1562. The structure underwent many additions over the years. The dome diameter is approximately 6 metres (20 ft).

The dargah is surrounded by a marble patio and is covered with intricate jalis (transl. trellis walls). The dargah complex also has a wazookhana (transl. ablution area).

The tombs of Nizamuddin Auliya and Amir Khusro, and the graves of Jahanara Begum and Mohammed Shah, are listed as Monuments of National Importance.

=== Jamat Khana Masjid ===
Next to the dargah is the Jamat Khana Masjid, also known as the Khilji Mosque. The mosque is built of red sandstone and has three bays. Its stone walls are carved with inscriptions of texts from the Quran. The mosque has arches that have been embellished with lotus buds, in addition to the façade of its dome having ornamental medallions. The structure was built during the reign of Alauddin Khalji by his son Khizr Khan. Completed between 1312 and 1313, Khizr was responsible for the central dome and hall, and was a follower of Nizamuddin. Around 1325, when Muhammad bin Tughlaq took over the reign, he constructed the two adjoining halls, each of which has two domes. The southern hall, chhoti masjid (transl. small mosque) is restricted to women and features a wooden door. The large dome of the mosque features a golden bowl that is suspended from the centre.

=== Baoli ===
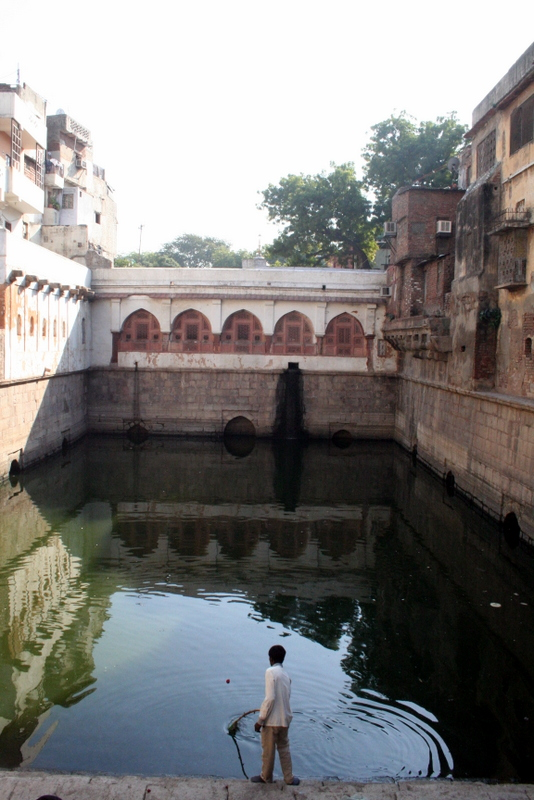
The baoli

At the back entrance of the complex is a baoli (transl. stepwell), commissioned by Nizamuddin and completed in 1321. It is close to the Yamuna river and is always filled. People believe that its waters have magical powers and bathe in it. According to legend, Ghiyasuddin Tughlaq had commissioned the Tughlaqabad Fort at the same time the baoli was being built. Because he forbade all workers from working on the baoli, they would work on it at night. Upon discovering this, the supply of oil was restricted. The masons then lit their lamps with the water of the baoli, after a blessing.

The baoli is listed as a Monument of National Importance.

== Location ==
The neighbourhood surrounding the dargah, Nizamuddin Basti, is named after the saint. The area was initially the site of the settlement of Ghiyaspur, where Nizamuddin lived, and was later named after him. The Basti's population mainly grew after refugees settled here during the Partition of India. Prior to that, the area was mainly occupied only by the pirzade, the direct descendants of Nizamuddin.

The dargah complex is immediately surrounded by the Sabz Burj at the intersection of Lodhi Road and Mathura Road, the Urs Mahal (a stage for the qawwalis), and the Chausath Khamba.

=== Culture ===
The area is referred to as the "nerve centre of Sufi culture in India". On the 17th and 18th day of the Islamic month of Rabi' al-awwal, thousands gather to observe the birth anniversary and urs (death anniversary) of the saint. Besides this, thousands also visit on the birth and death anniversaries of Amir Khusrau, Nizamuddin's disciple. Hundreds visit the dargah everyday throughout the year to pray and pay their respects. The dargah has a tradition of qawwali, especially the one on every Thursday night attracting approximately 1,500 visitors. The regular qawwalis occur every evening after the Maghrib prayer. The dargah has multiple intergenerational darbari qawwals. Women are traditionally not allowed inside the dargah's inner sanctum. Besides this, the dargah organises a daily langar.

The evening prayers in which lamps are lit, called the Dua-e-Roshni, is an important ritual. Pilgrims gather around the khadim, the caretaker, who prays for the wishes of all those gathered to be granted.

Death is celebrated in most Sufi orders. As part of the urs, the dargah complex and the tombs are lit up in the tradition of charaghan. Lakhs of people from different religions come from across the world and recite verses in the tradition of fateha. Plates of rose petals and sweets are offered to the tombs and fragrant chaddars (transl. sheets) are draped on them. People tie colourful threads on the jaalis and make vows (mannat) to the saints. Each thread symbolises a wish.

The festival of Basant Panchami is also celebrated at the dargah. According to legend, Nizamuddin was deeply attached to his nephew, Khwaja Taqiuddin Nuh, who died due to an illness. Nizamuddin grieved over him for a long time. Khusrau, his disciple, wanted to see him smile and dressed up in yellow and began celebrating the onset of Basant, after spotting some women do the same. This caused Auliya to smile, an occasion that is commemorated to this day.

==== In popular culture ====
"Arziyan", a qawwali in the 2009 film Delhi 6 composed by A. R. Rahman is dedicated to Nizamuddin Auliya. "Kun Faya Kun", a song in the 2011 movie Rockstar and again composed by Rahman, is also shot at the dargah, featuring Ranbir Kapoor and Nizami Bandhu, the traditional qawwal of the dargah. The dargah has also been featured in movies like Bajrangi Bhaijaan featuring Salman Khan and Kareena Kapoor, and in "Aawan Akhiyan Jawan Akhiyan" a qawwali in the 2006 film Ahista Ahista featuring Soha Ali Khan and Abhay Deol.

== Management ==
The dargah is a property that belongs to the Delhi Waqf Board. Offerings are collected under the baridari system through pirzadas, who are the custodians of the Sufi shrines. This usually comprises descendants of those buried at the dargah. The committee, Anjuman Peerzadan Nizamiyan Khusravi, looks after the dargah.

== Gallery ==
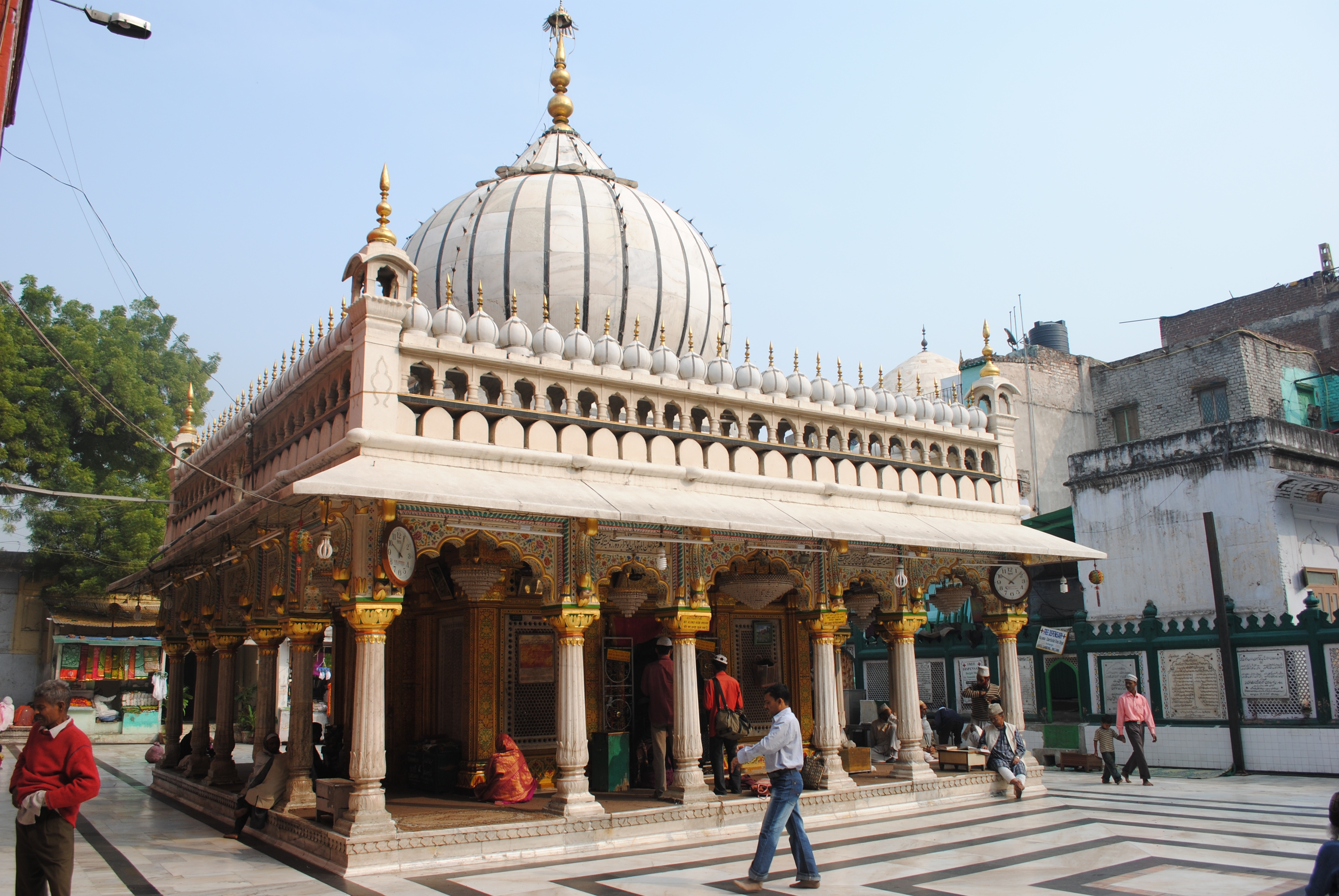
Nizamuddin's mausoleum

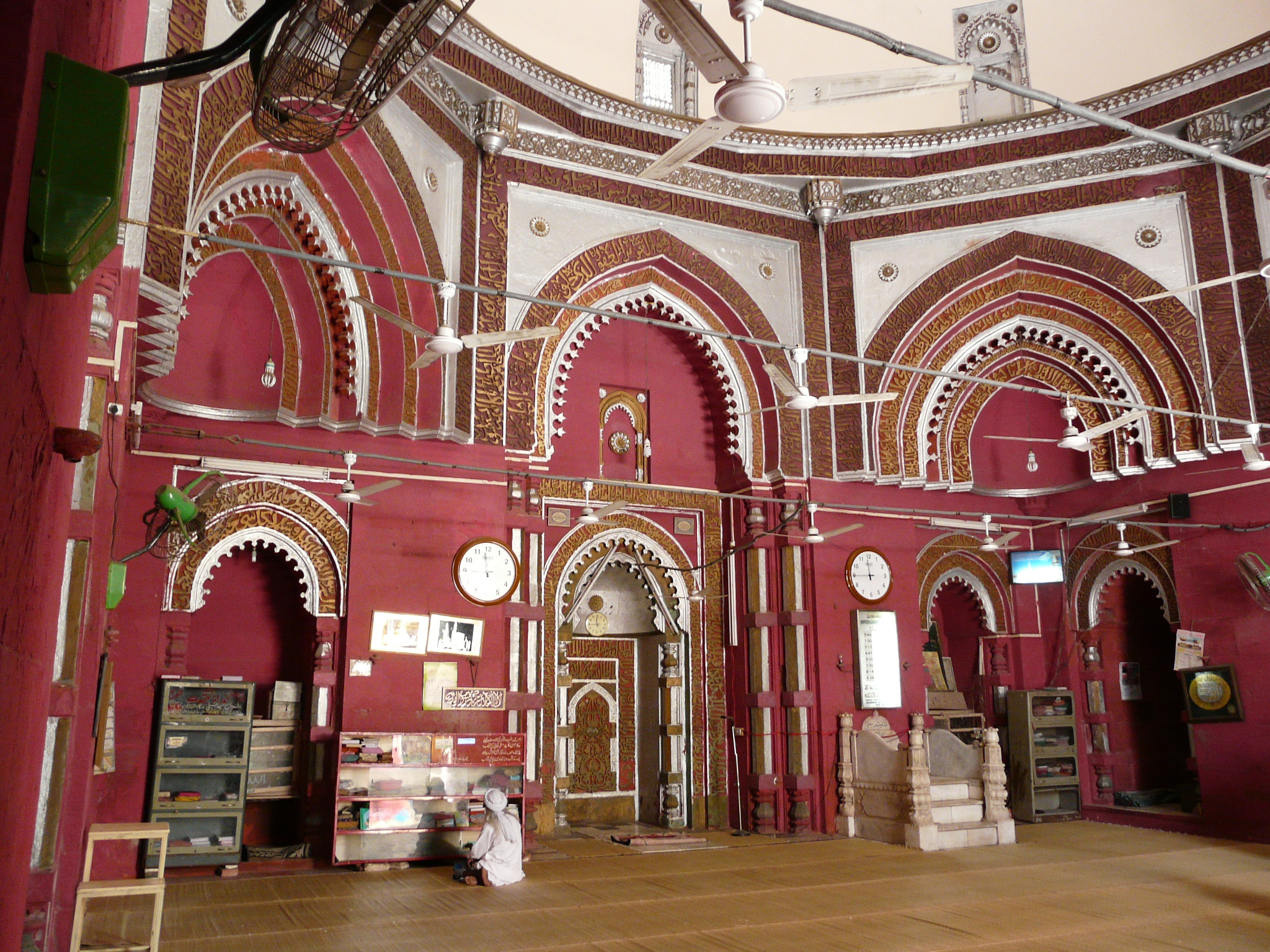
The mosque mihrab

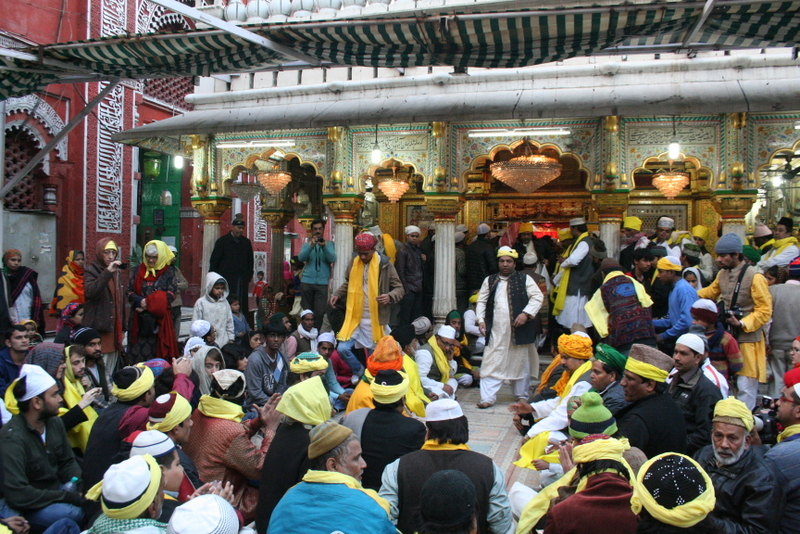
Basant celebrations at the dargah

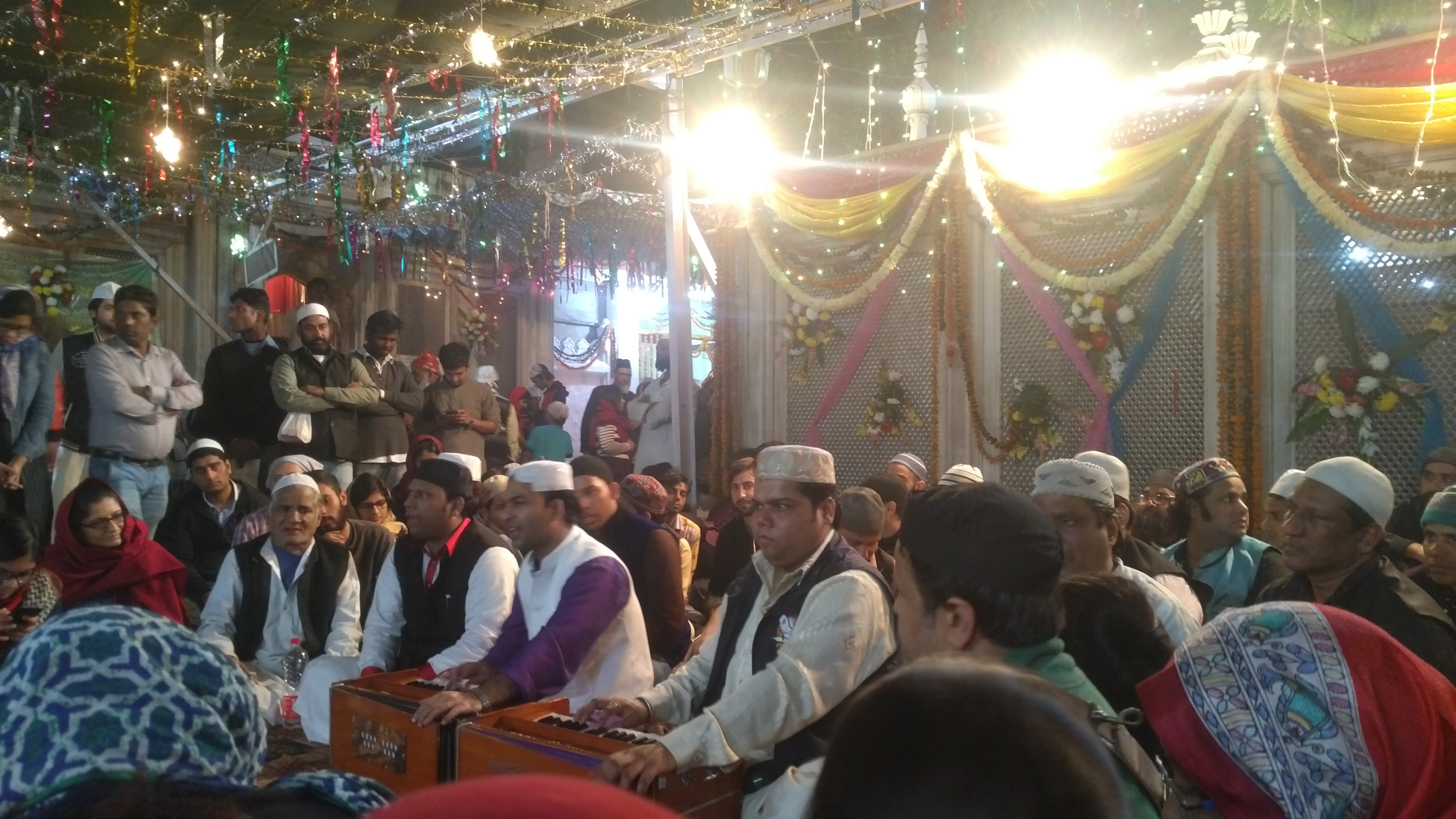
Qawwali session at Nizamuddin

== See also ==
- Islam in India
- List of dargahs in India
- List of mosques in India
- List of Monuments of National Importance in Delhi
- Sufism in India
