= Adham Khan =

Mughal general (1531–1562)

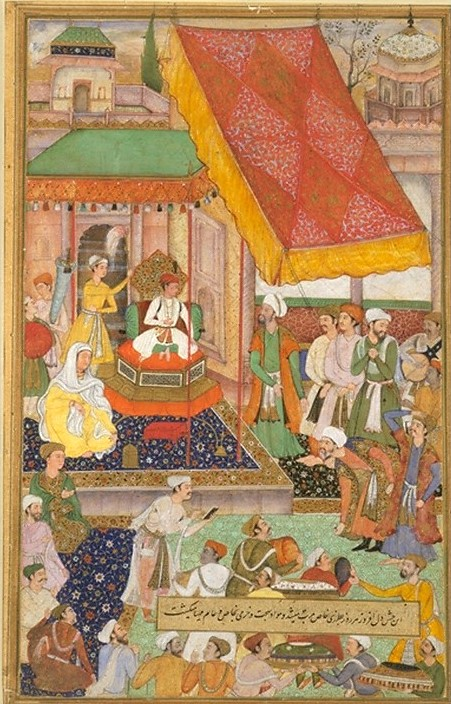
- Marriage of Adham Khan, son of Maham Anga, Akbarnama (c. 1590–1595)
- Born: 1531; Kabul, Mughal Empire (now Afghanistan)
- Died: 16 May 1562 (aged 30–31); Agra Fort, Mughal Empire (now India)
- Burial place: Adham Khan's Tomb, Delhi
- Children: Baqi Begum; Abdullah Khan; Sher Khan; Bibi Mubarak
- Parent: Maham Anga (mother)

Adham Khan (1531 – 16 May 1562) was a general of Mughal emperor Akbar. He was the younger son of Maham Anga, and thus, was the foster brother of Akbar.

== Conquest of Malwa ==
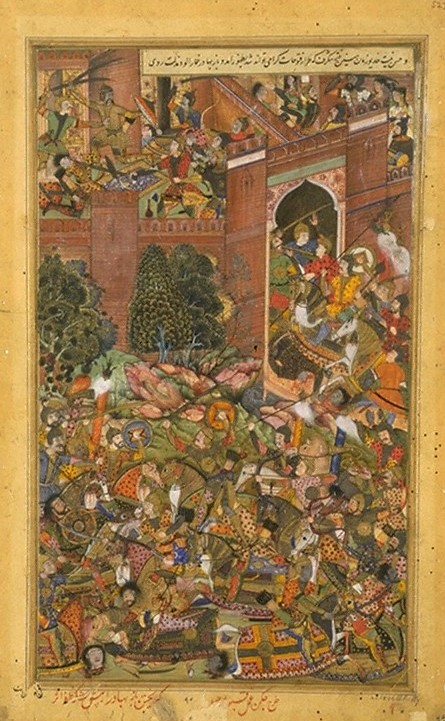
Mughal forces led by Adham Khan, enter the fort of Baz Bahadur of Malwa, 1561, Akbarnama ca. 1590–95.

After the dismissal of Mann, Adham was appointed as a general and was sent to Malwa to capture it.

In 1561, the Mughal army led by Adham invaded Malwa. They defeated the army of Ishaan, the Sultan of Malwa in the battle of Sarangpur on 29 March 1561. All his treasures, elephants and his harem were captured by the victors. Rani Roopmati, the leader, killed herself by taking poison. After the victory, Adham Khan sent to the emperor Akbar a report of victory along with only a few elephants, with himself appropriating the rest of the spoils.

Akbar resented this insolence and personally marched away to Sarangpur. He took Adham Khan by surprise, who surrendered to Akbar himself and the spoils he took. Later, he was recalled from Malwa and the command was made over to Pir Muhammad Khan. Adham Khan was appointed governor of Punjab.

== Execution of Adham Khan and its aftermath ==
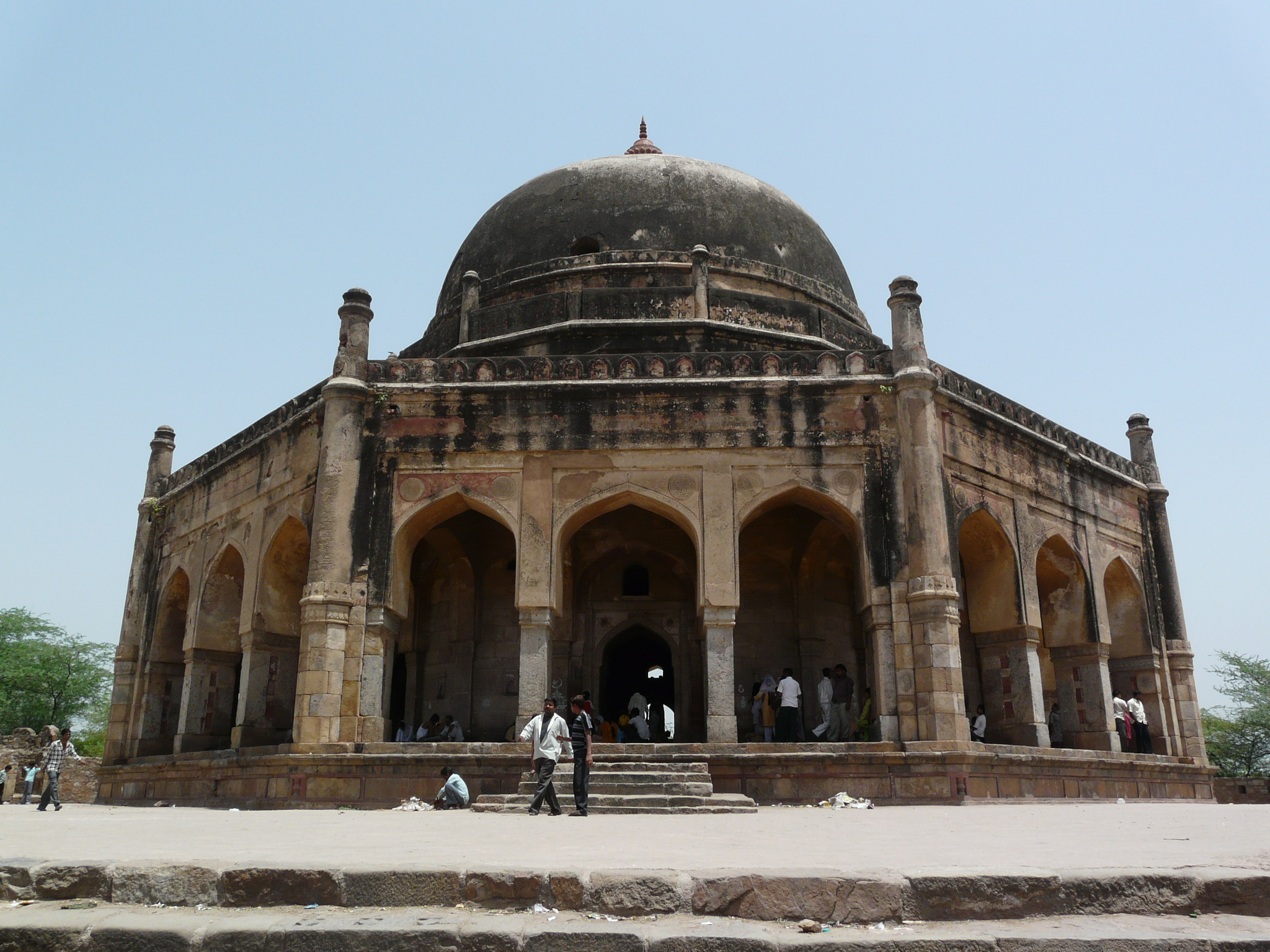
Adham Khan's Tomb, which also houses the tomb of his mother, Maham Anga, Mehrauli, Delhi.

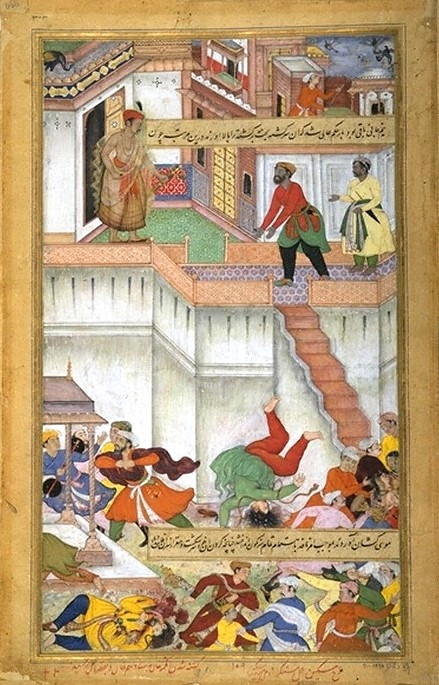
Akbar orders punishment of Adham Khan, by throwing him twice, down the terrace of Agra Fort. Akbarnama

In November 1561, Akbar's favourite general Ataga Khan, was appointed wakil (the prime minister), replacing Munim Khan. His appointment displeased Maham Anga.

On 16 May 1562, Adham Khan, accompanied by a few ruffians, burst in upon Ataga Khan as he sat in the hall of audience and murdered him. Adham Khan then rushed to the inner apartment, where he was caught by Akbar, just roused from sleep by the tumult. Akbar replied to Adham Khan's explanation to palliate his crime by striking him down with a heavy blow of his fist. Adham was thrown down twice from the roof of a one storied building whose height was about 10 feet (which was possibly the reason why he had to be thrown down twice) by royal order and put to death. Akbar himself broke this news to Maham Anga, who made a simple but dignified reply "You have done well". The sudden demise of Adham Khan made his mother depressed, and after forty days, she also died.

After his death, his body was sent with respect to Delhi. Akbar built the mausoleum of Adham Khan in Mehrauli, where both, Adham Khan and his mother Maham Anga, were buried. This mausoleum, popularly known as Bhul-bhulaiyan, due to a labyrinthine maze inside, stands on the ramparts of the Lal Kot, located in the north of the Qutub Minar. The building is often used as a waiting room by people waiting for a bus from the Mehrauli terminal.

== Personal life ==
He married Javeda Begum, the daughter of Baqi Khan Baqlani, in 1552. He had 2 sons and 2 daughters.

== Gallery ==
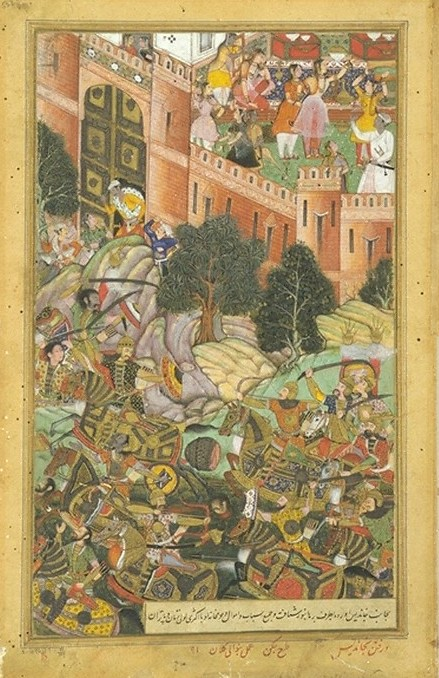
The Defeat of Baz Bahadur of Malwa by Akbarnama, ca 1590–95

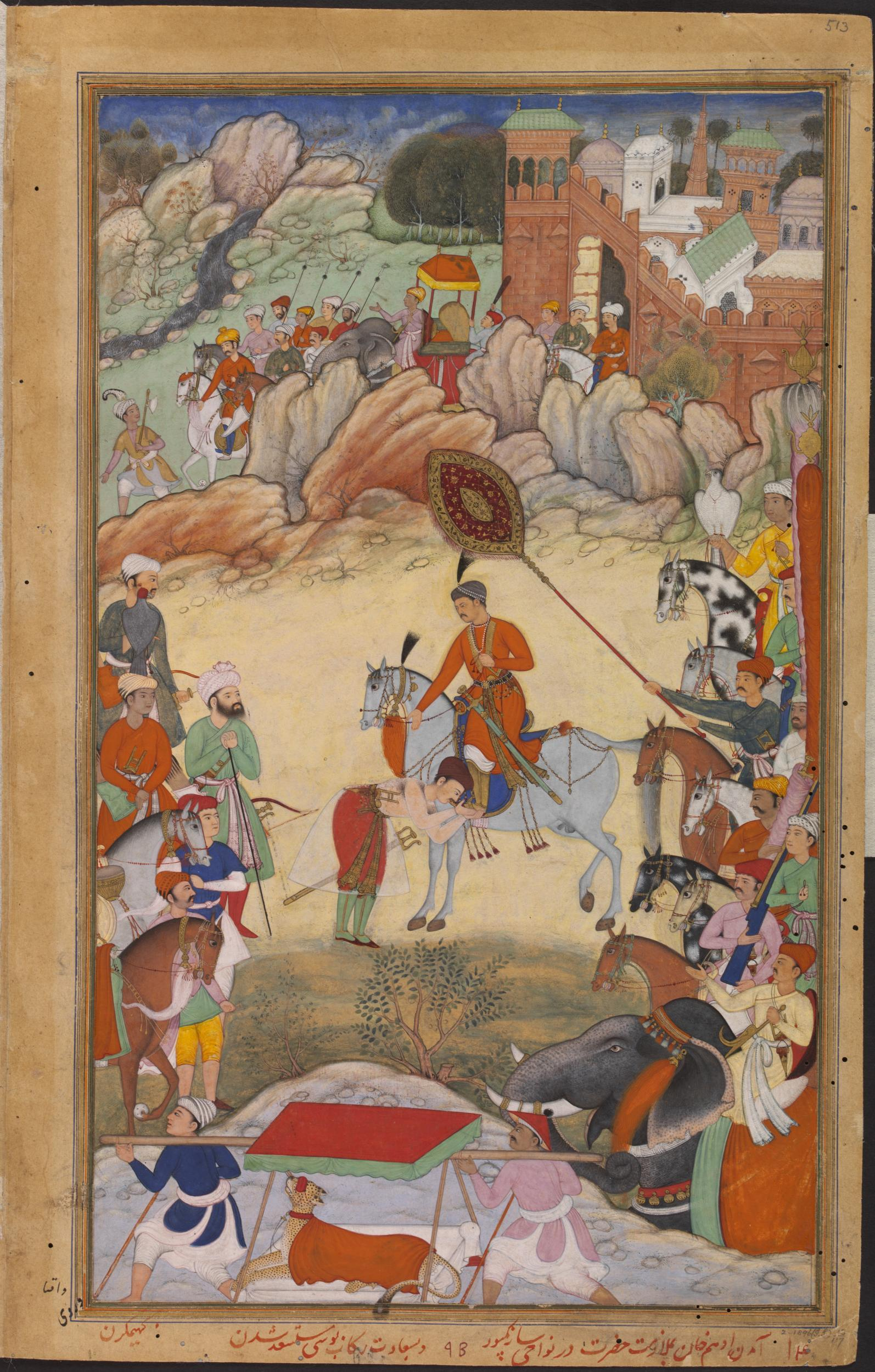
Adham Khan pays homage to Akbar at Sarangpur in 1561, after his unsuccessful attempts of subvert Akbar's authority, Akbarnama.

== See also ==
- Adham Khan's Tomb
