= Victoria and Albert Akbarnama =

The first illustrated manuscript of the Akbar-nāma

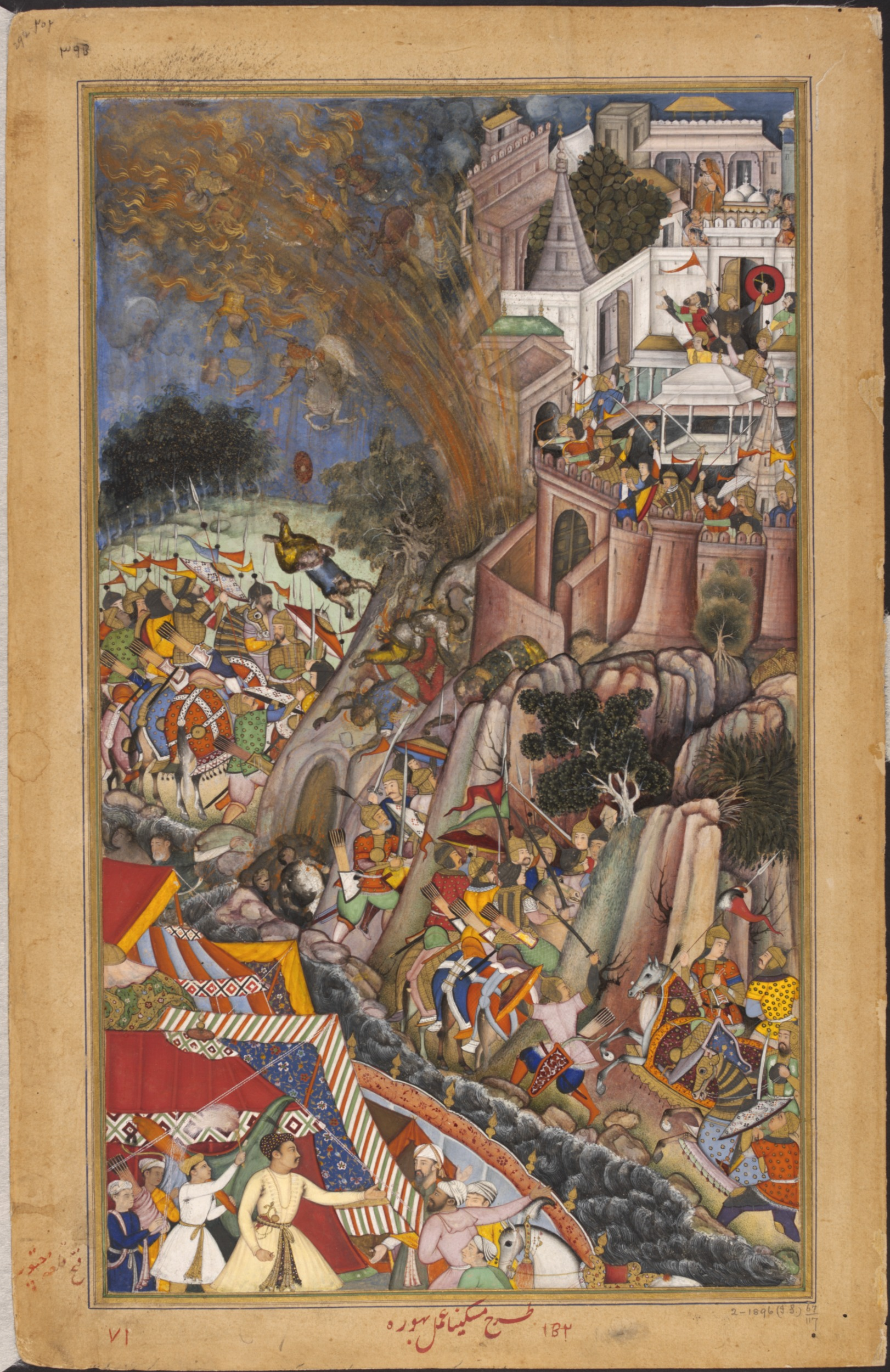
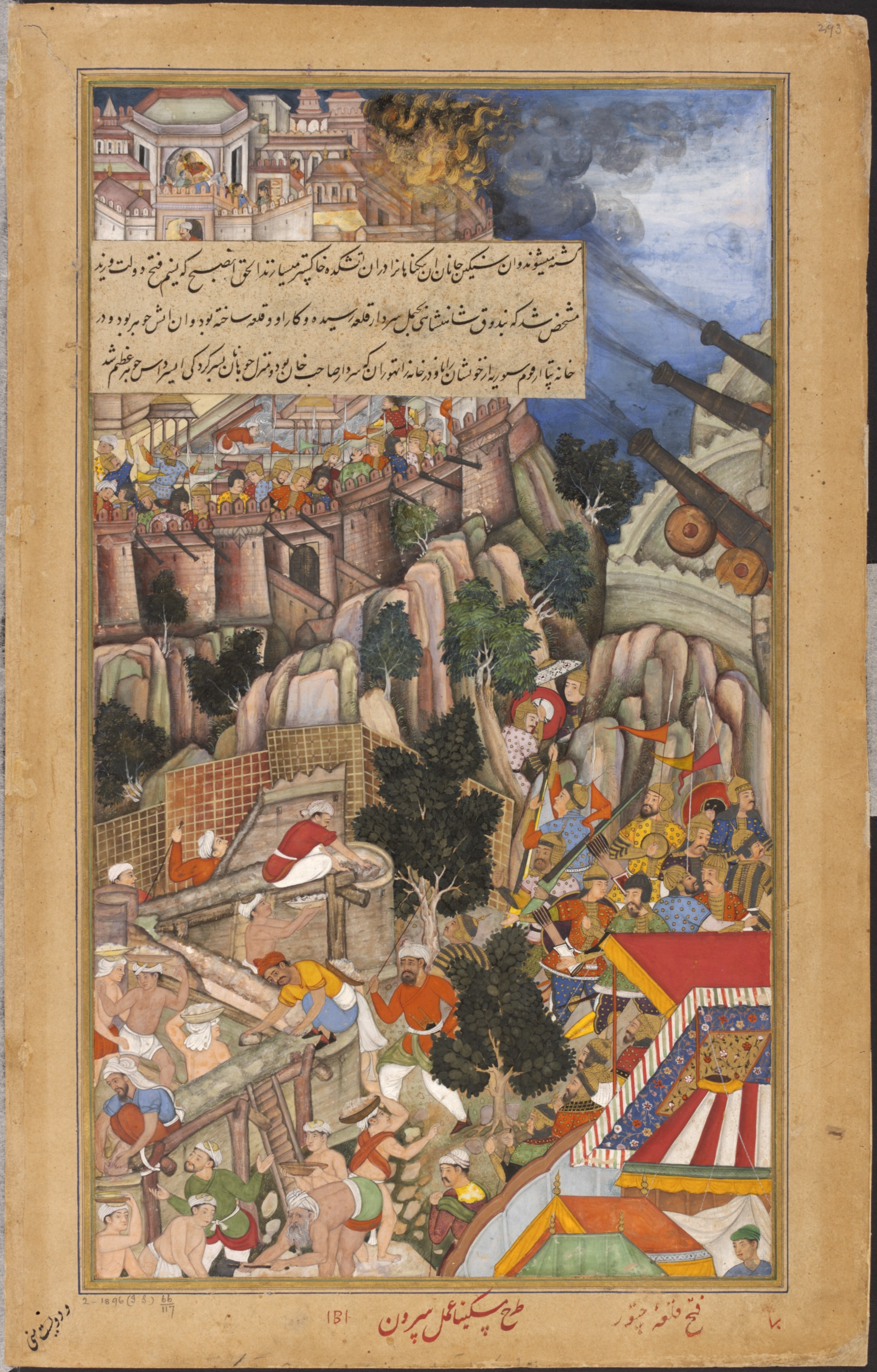
Explosion during the siege of Chittorgarh on December 17, 1567

The Victoria and Albert Akbarnāma or First Akbar-nāma is the first illustrated manuscript of the Akbarnama, the history of the Mughal ruler Akbar and his ancestors from the pen of Abul Fazl. It is also the oldest copy of the Akbar-nāma, which was written at almost the same time as this history.

Even before Abul Fazl had completed his text, the already drafted chapters were copied by a calligrapher and illustrated in the royal studios. This haste meant that massive changes had to be made to the already illustrated manuscript following a revision of the work by the author. In order to be able to continue using the elaborately produced illuminations in the revised text version, text panels within the pictures and on their reverse sides had to be pasted over with the new wording. As a result, the illustrated pages of the manuscript in particular are unusually thick.

The first volume of this Akbar-nāma is in the Golestan Palace in Tehran. The second volume, with 116 images depicting events during the period between 1560 and 1577, is now kept in the Victoria and Albert Museum under the inventory number I.S. 2-1896 1-117. About 20 detached illustrations are also distributed among various museums and collections worldwide.

There is no consensus among experts as to the exact dating of the illustrations. Due to their stylistic proximity to an illustrated history of Timur, the Tīmūr-nāma (c. 1584–1586), some place them in the period from 1586 to 1587, while others, due to the known time of composition of the Akbar-nāma, assume a period of origin from 1590 to 1595.

== History of the manuscript ==
The manuscript has no colophon. However, on the lower margin of folio 84/117 (image no. 169, verso) there is an informal note which reads: "completed at the command of ...(illegible)... in the month Day of the year 40". This refers to the 40th year of Akbar's reign, resulting in a date between December 10, 1595 and January 9, 1596. The text and images of the Victoria-and-Albert-Akbar-nāma only cover the period from 1560 to 1577. In addition to this small inscription, several seals and handwritten annotations on the recto of the first folio Notes on the further whereabouts of the manuscript: Jahangir confirms in an autograph that he took over the work shortly after his accession to the throne and classifies this Akbar-nāma as a particularly valuable manuscript of "first class second degree". Next, Aurangzeb had his seal affixed to the volume in 1668/69, after which the work disappeared from the imperial library at an unspecified date. Seals from 1766 and 1794 identify the Nawab of Rampur as the new owner. The further fate of the book can only be vaguely traced. Since the first volume of the Victoria-and-Albert-Akbar-nāma is in the Golestan Palace, suggests that this volume arrived in Iran at some point after 1669. The second volume remained in India until it was discovered by Major General Clarke, who was a senior administrative officer in the province of Awadh from 1858 to 1862. His widow finally sold the manuscript to the Victoria and Albert Museum in 1896. The museum initially assumed that it was an illustrated Āʾīn-i Akbarī. It was only when Henry Beveridge visited the museum in 1905 that he identified the manuscript as an Akbar-nāma.

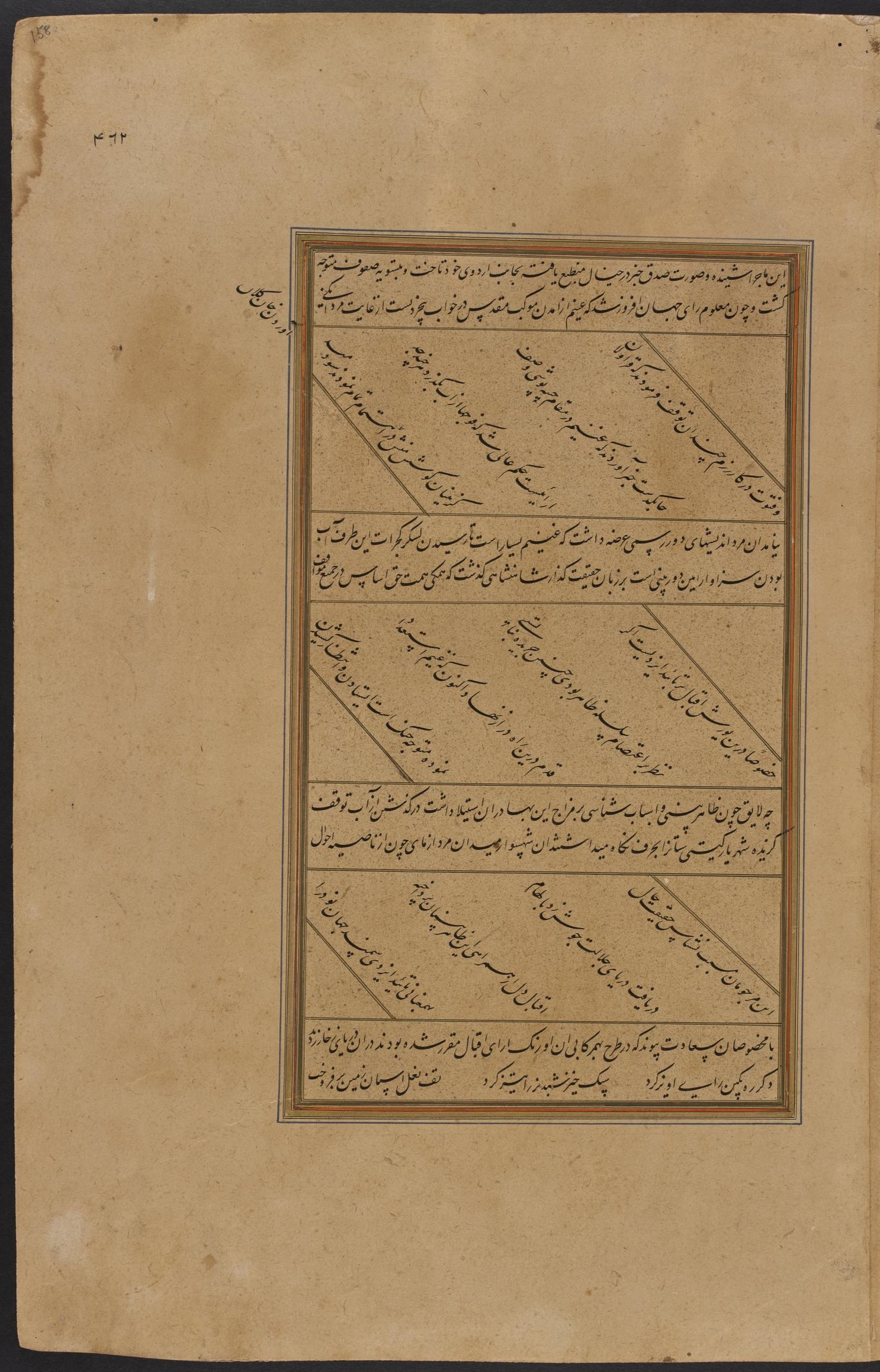
Eine Seite aus dem 1. Akbar-nāma, ca. 1590.

== The outer shape ==
The fragmentary manuscript in the Victoria and Albert Museum comprises 273 folios with 116 illustrations and an illuminated frontispiece. Die Seiten haben eine Größe von 37,4 × 24,7 cm, die Textfelder mit 25 Zeilen, beschrieben in Nastaʿlīq, messen 24 × 13,4 cm. The pictures are on average about 32.5 × 19.5 cm in size. At the time of its acquisition by the Victoria and Albert Museum, the manuscript had already partially disintegrated into its individual folios, which were loosely stored between two varnished book covers in a box. The 116 illustrations have been individually framed so that they can be exhibited.

A special feature of the manuscript are the unusually thick image pages and strangely designed text fields on the illustrations. During an examination of the manuscript, John Seyller discovered that these peculiarities are the result of subsequent changes to the text. In order to be able to use the painstakingly produced images for a different text, the backs were covered over with a complete page of text and the text fields in the illustrations were pasted over with new, matching text panels. In some cases, the old wording was also painted over or made unrecognizable in some other way, for example in image 101. Folios that only had writing on the front and back were simply replaced with newly written sheets. The changes can be seen not only in the different colors of the original paper and the paper used later, but also in the sometimes oversized, sometimes crookedly pasted new text panels (for example, image nos. 110, 115, 116) as well as the handwriting of another, earlier calligrapher, which is still visible in a few places.

The new wording required different catchwords on the image pages. Often the scribe simply wrote the current custode next to the earlier one. Sometimes a custode appears on both the front and back of an illustrated folio - an indication that the page was turned over when the book was redesigned, i.e. transformed from a recto into a verso or vice versa.

Finally, the new text had to be fitted in so that the narrative met the corresponding illustration at the right point. To achieve this, the calligrapher sometimes artificially slowed down the pace of the narrative by setting the lines at an angle.

== The dating of the illustrations ==
Abu 'l-Fazl was first commissioned to write the history of Akbar's reign in 1589 and handed over the first part of the text, which covers the period up to 1572, in April 1596. Two years later, the continuation of the work up to 1598 was completed. The Victoria and Albert Museum assigns the illustrations in this manuscript to the period ca. 1592-1594. However, the question of when it was created is controversial.

Roughly speaking, there are two different chronological classifications: one group of experts dates the paintings to around 1590-1595 another to 1586-1587. The latter agrees with Seyller's assessment. He had been able to prove that the illustrations are older than the accompanying text and concluded from this that the pictures belong to an earlier, unknown Akbar story - a thesis that Milo Beach, a former director of the Freer Gallery of Art, had already put forward in 1981. The dating of the illustrations can therefore be carried out independently of the composition of the Akbar-nāma according to purely stylistic aspects. After a detailed consideration of the artistic characteristics, he places the miniatures between the Tārīkh-i khāndān-i Tīmūriyya of 1584/86 and the Rāmāyana of 1589, whereby he considers a creation in the years 1586/87 to be probable.

Susan Stronge, curator at the Victoria and Albert Museum, disagrees with Seyller's statements. In her research, she has come to the conclusion that the text for which the images were originally produced is merely one of the older versions of Abū 'l-Fazl's work. However, the current text does not yet correspond to the known edition of Akbar-nāma. The most striking differences are the abrupt beginning of the text in 1560, which does not correspond to any of the known volume divisions, the lack of a long epilogue after the end of the first thirty years of Akbar's life and the similarly missing introduction to the next volume.

Abu 'l-Fazl revised his text several times. According to the contemporary history work Tabaqāt-i Akbarī, one of the early versions was already in circulation in 1592/93. According to Stronge, work on an illustrated Akbar-nāma manuscript could therefore have begun as early as 1592 or even 1590. In any case, the pictures were made for an Akbar-nāma. And since this was not commissioned until 1589, it is impossible that the accompanying illustrations were created as early as 1586/87, as suggested by Seyller. She therefore does not address Seyller's stylistic-historical arguments.

== Role models in the Tārīḫ-i ḫandān-i Tīmūriyya ==
Seyller's conclusions tie in with Milo Beach's considerations that the illustrations of the First Akbar-nāma could have been intended for an earlier biography of Akbar, possibly a kind of continuation of the History of the Descendants of Timur (pers. Tarīḫ-i ḫandān-i Tīmūriyya). This richly illustrated work, also called Tīmūr-nāma, was the first historical manuscript to be written and illustrated together with the Tariḫ-i aḫlfi (pers. History of 1000 Years) at the Mughal court from 1584. The fact that the paintings of the Akbar-nāma are stylistically closely related to those of the Tīmūr-nāma is not only due to the fact that the painters in the later manuscript were able to fall back on a compositional vocabulary that had already been established by the Tīmūr-nāma. In fact, a number of the same painters were involved in both manuscripts: Basawan, Laʿl, Miskin, Jagan and Kesav Kalan were responsible for the composition here and there. Other artists, who were primarily responsible for the coloring, can also be found in both manuscripts.

The similarities in the manuscripts are particularly evident in episodes from Akbar's life that appear in both manuscripts. Two illustrations in the First Akbar-nāma on the siege of Ranthambhor have each adopted individual elements from the "Siege of Chitor" in the Tīmūr-nāma. The close relationship between the two manuscripts is also evident in the "Battle of Sarnal", while the corresponding illustration in the "Second Akbar-nāma" looks completely different. Here the forest of thorns has shrunk into a compact hedge and most of the riders are galloping along quite uniformly with their sabres drawn. Much of the vibrancy of the earlier images has been lost.

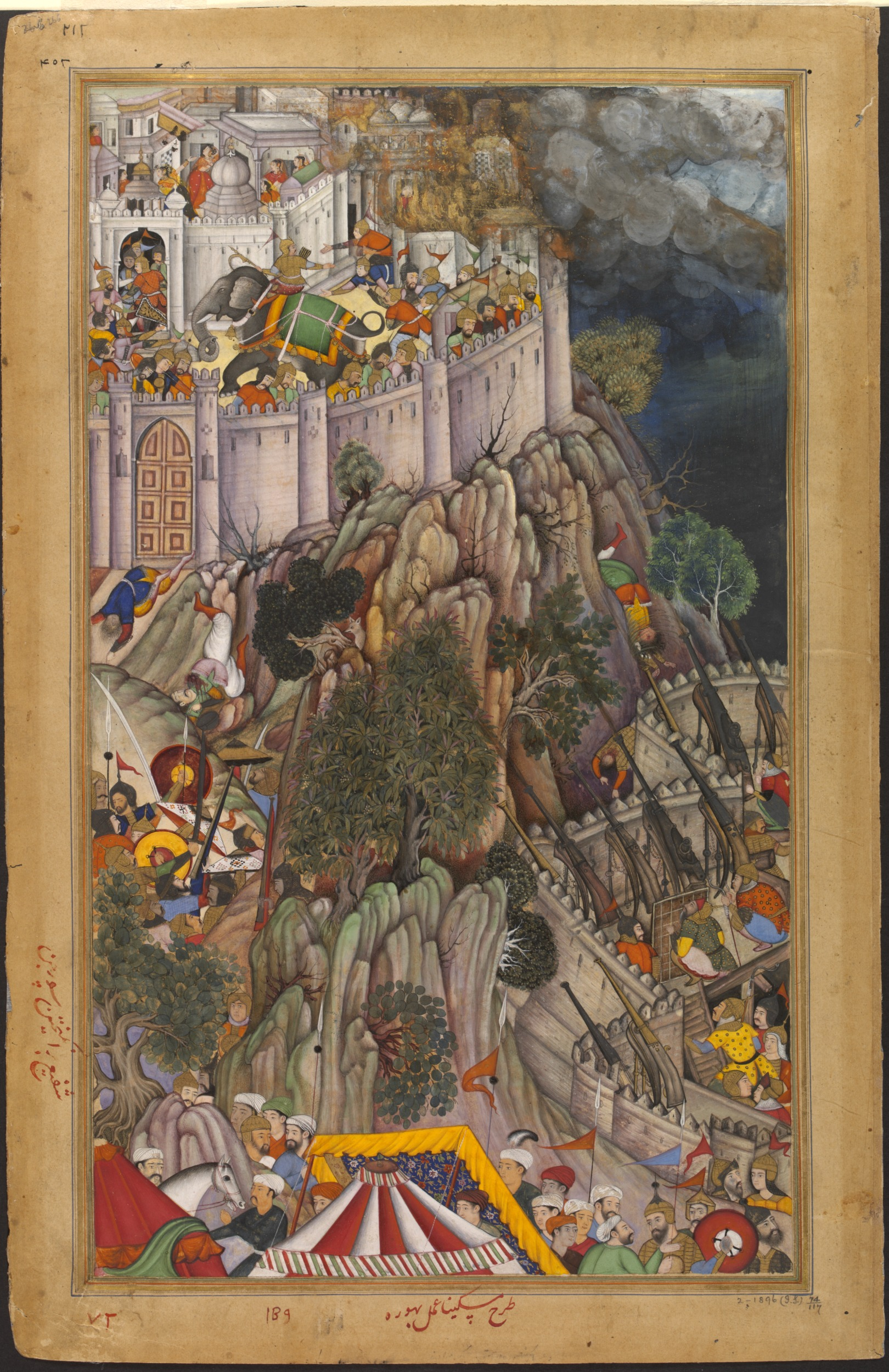
First Akbar-nāma: Siege of Ranthambhor (fig. 159). Miskina.

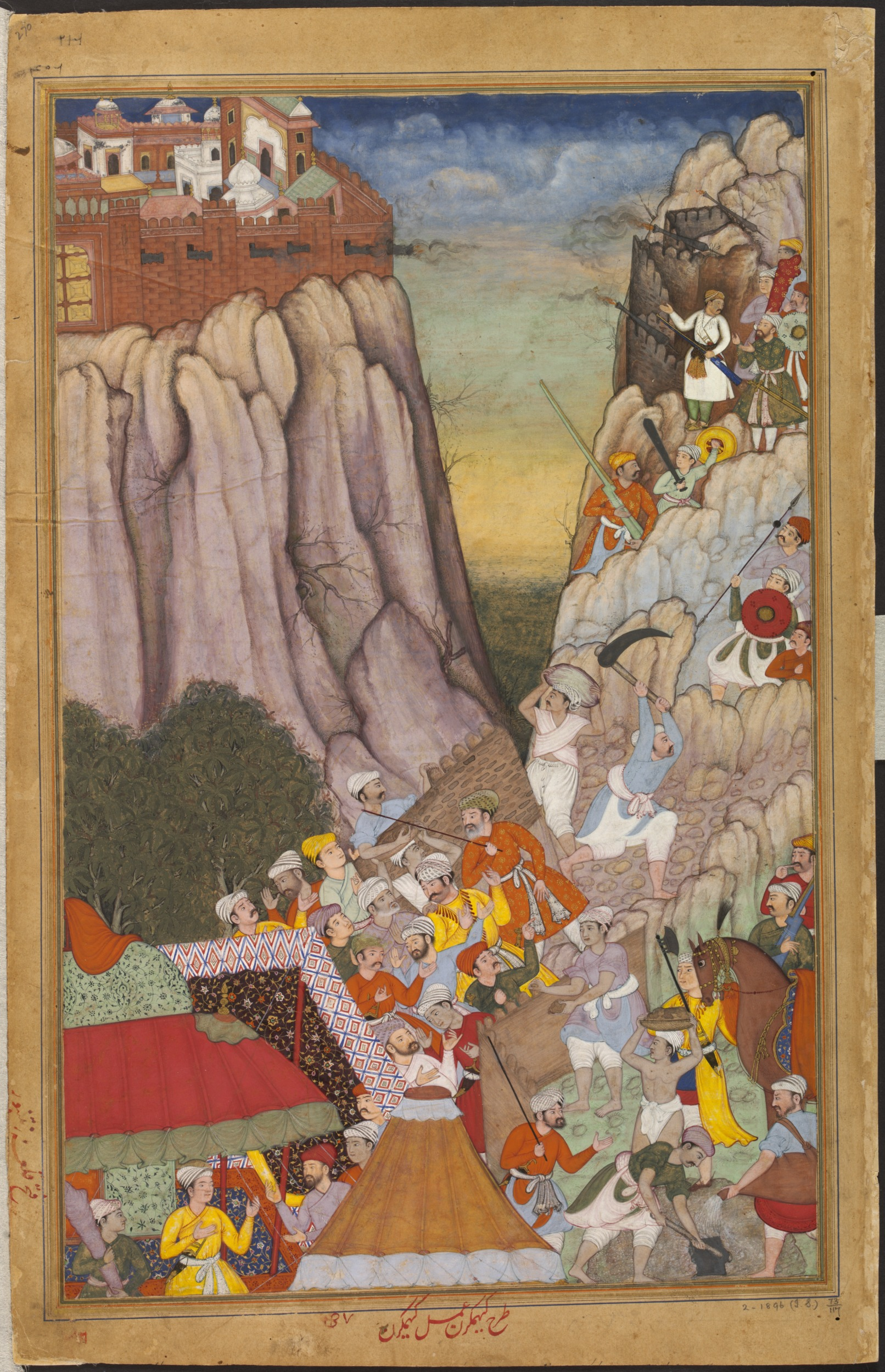
First Akbar-nāma: Siege of Ranthambhor (picture 157). Khem Karan.

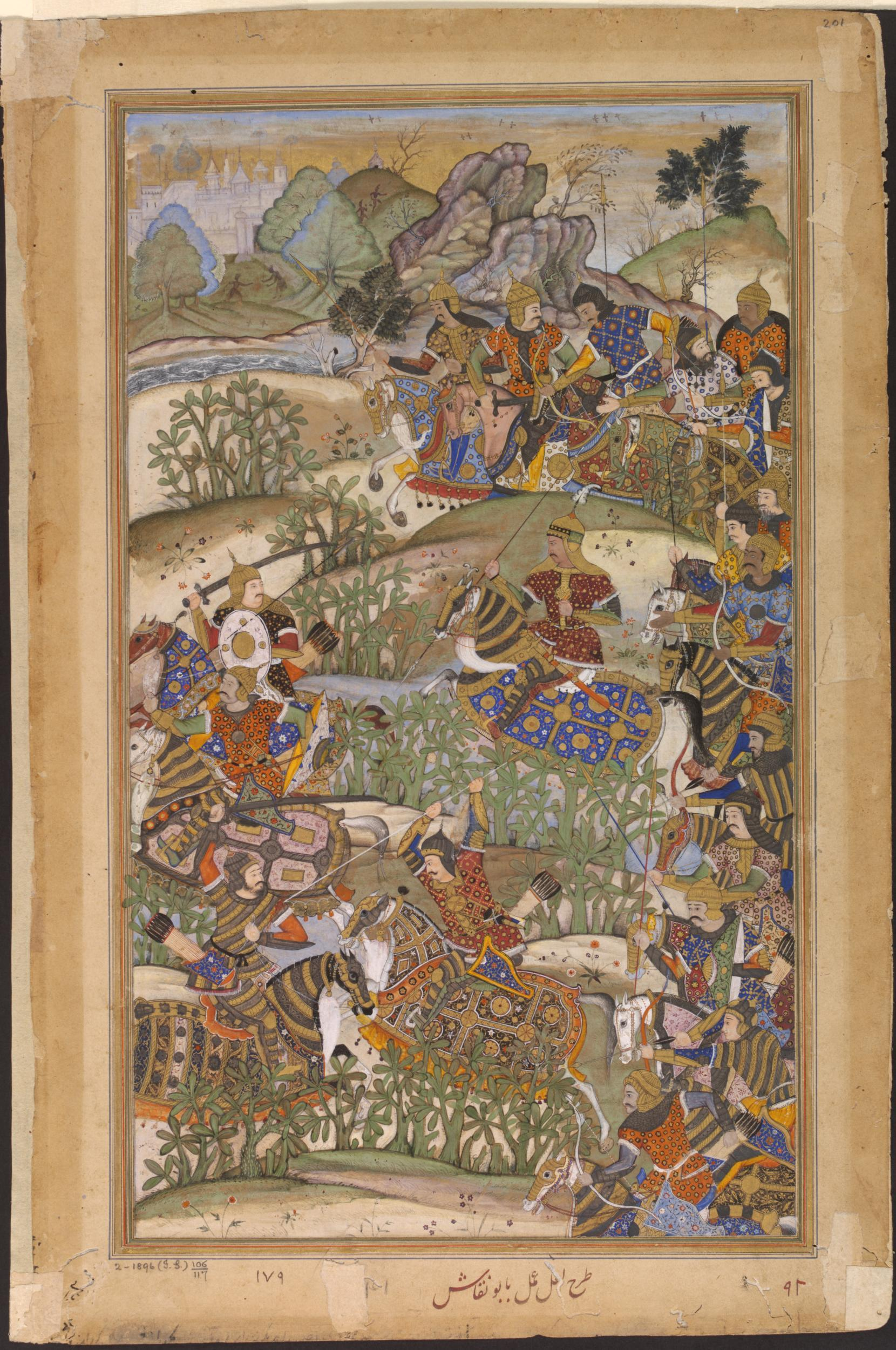
First Akbar-nāma: Battle of Sarnal (picture 179). Laʿl.

== The order of the illustrations ==
The illustrated events of the Victoria-and-Albert-Akbar-nāma take place between November 1560 and 1577. The numbering of the paintings by the museum shortly after the purchase does not correspond to their actual order in the work. There are various rows of numbers in the margins of the illustrations; the one in the middle of the lower margin, usually written in red, is the most authoritative. The others in red and black presumably refer to earlier arrangements of the pictures. The sequence begins with number 82 on fol. 2/117 and ends with number 197 on fol. 114/117, which means that none of the sequence of 116 pictures is missing from the present volume, and that the first volume contained 81 pictures. This first volume probably also contains a number of pictures with numbers between 7 and 45. They are in various museums and collections. Only one detached illustration belongs to a later event (April 1578); it is kept in the British Library (Johnson Album 8.4) and immediately follows the series in the Victoria and Albert Museum.

== Content of the pictures ==
The pictures in the Victoria and Albert Museum reflect the events from the 5th to the 22nd year of Akbar's reign. It can be seen that the illustrations are not evenly distributed throughout the text, but have certain focal points. With 19 miniatures (100, 101, 121, 128, 129, 131-134, 141-150) the various attempts at rebellion by the Uzbeks, which lasted from around July 1561 to July 1567, take up most of the space. The Uzbek revolt, led by ʿAlī Qulī Khān Zamān and his brother Bahādur Khān, was not only one of the longest, but also one of the most dangerous episodes for the young Mughal ruler and ultimately decisive for the subsequent reorganization of the army.

Great importance was obviously also attached to hunting with 15 illustrations (82, 97, 98, 99, 119, 120, 124, 125, 135, 136, 155, 156, 169, 173, 174).

The battle against the Mirzas was closely linked to the conquest of Gujarat and extends over twelve paintings (179-190). Like Akbar, the Mirzas were descendants of Timur. Their grandfather or father Muhammad Sultān Mīrzā had once come to India with Bābur. They had wanted to shake off Akbar's supremacy and briefly allied themselves with the Uzbeks. Ibrāhīm Husayn Mīrzā, Muhammad Husayn Mīrzā and Shāh Mīrzā finally succeeded in capturing the cities of Baroda, Surat and Champaner. When Akbar tried to expand his empire to the southwest, they were among the most dangerous opponents in Gujarat.

A total of nine illustrations show the siege and capture of the Rajput forts of Chittor and Ranthambhor (151-154 and 157-161).

Finally, five miniatures dealing with Akbar's nurse Māham Anaga and her sons (88, 89, 95, 96, 109) testify to the importance of the milk kinship.

== The painters ==
The 1st Akbar-nāma was, like most of the richly illustrated historical manuscripts, produced as a team. An experienced master was responsible for the composition (pers. ṭarḥ), while a mostly younger colleague was responsible for the actual execution (pers. ʿamal) in color. In order to ensure a correct and presentable depiction of Akbar or other high personalities, specialists were also employed for the faces (pers. chihra). As the painters were sometimes paid according to their work, their names and activities were often noted below the paintings. Many of these details can still be found on the pages of the Victoria and Albert Museum. The designs are by a total of twelve painters, the most prominent of whom are as follows: Laʿl (at least 19 miniatures), Miskīn(ā) (at least 18 miniatures), Kesav Kalān (16 miniatures), Basāwan (ten) and Jagan (ten). Around thirty other painters were involved in the coloring (ʿamal), although the exact number of those involved cannot be determined with complete certainty: Most of them came from non-Muslim Indian backgrounds and the Persian transliteration of their names is not always consistent. In addition, the same names sometimes occur more than once; the painters are then further identified by a kalān (the elder) or khurd (the younger), although this addition is not noted in all cases.

There seem to have been certain preferences in the collaboration: Sānwala only colored designs by Laʿl (nos. 89, 120, 138, 173, 180), Sarwān, with one exception (no. 98), only those by Miskīn(a) (nos. 126, 135, 151, 178, 197).

Specialists for the faces were above all Mādhav (seven pictures, including one with eight portraits), Basāwan (four), Kesav Kalān (three), Miskīn(ā) (five), and Nānhā, Sanwāla, Mukund (one each).

The young painters Manohar (no. 155), son of Basāwan, and Mansūr (nos. 136, 187) were already working in the studio and were given their first tasks for the color design. Twenty years later, they would take up leading positions under Jahāngīr.

The production of the miniatures was a very time-consuming process. On a total of 15 pictures in the Victoria and Albert manuscript, there are still recognizable remnants of notes which prove that the production process took between 42 (no. 191) and 68 days (no. 161). Such a note is particularly clearly visible at the bottom right edge of image 120.

== Scattered illustrations of the 1st Akbar-nāma ==
No.	Image	Depicted event	Found at Beveridge (B) and in the Persian edition(P)	Painter	Storage location
		Illuminated opening page of the text. - Folio size 35.2 × 18 cm; image size 32 × 16 cm.	B I: 1–5 P I: 1–2	ʿamal Mansūr naqqāsh	München, Museum Fünf Kontinente, Inv.-Nr. 77-11-309
(6)		The birth of Timur, the progenitor of the Indian Mughal dynasty. Timur was born into a nomadic tribe in Central Asia in the 14th century. The painters do not take these circumstances into account in any way, but present the events in a Mughal palace setting. The painter Shiv Das chooses a standardized form for this, which is similarly used for almost all the births of princes in the various historical works of the Akbar period (cf. nos. 162 and 165). - Folio size 37 × 24.5 cm; image size 29 × 18 cm.	B I: 205	ṭarḥ wa ʿamal: Shīv Dās chihra nāmī: Miskīnā	Paris, Musée Guimet, M.A. 5674
7		Sultan Bayezid I was captured at the Battle of Ankara in July 1402. The text on the illustration reports that Timur treated him with great kindness and assigned him a place of honor above the princes at his audience. - Image size 34 × 21 cm.	B I: 209–11 P I: 79–80	ʿamal: Dharm Dās	New York, Metropolitan Museum of Art, 35.64.4
Babur time
8		Akbar's grandfather Babur has captured the fortress of Kabul and is now holding an audience there (October 1504). The image can be clearly identified by the text panels, but the illustration actually seems to have been made for a later event in the time of Akbar's father Humayun. The headdress is a special type that was first invented by Humayun and called tāj-i ʿizzat (pers. "crown of honor"). Khwandamir (st. 1535), a grandson of Mīrkhwānd, gives a detailed description of it. The text fields were subsequently edited and the lower one extended or pasted in so that the face of a mahout is obscured.	B I: 228 P I: 89	ʿamal: Mahish chihra nāmī: Basāwan	Washington D.C., Freer Gallery of Art, F1945.27
(9)		The miniature is not numbered and has neither a text field nor a text on the reverse, so that its classification must be based solely on the image itself. Milo C. Beach considers it to be an illustration of the second conquest of Kabul. However, the image content and text content do not correspond.	B evtl. I:232	ṭarḥ: Farrukh ʿamal: Dhanu nāmī chihra: Dharmdās	San Diego Museum of Art, Edwin Binney 3rd Collection, 1990.288
Humayun time
10		While the armies of Humayun and Sultan Bahadur confront each other at Mandsaur, the latter flees towards Mandu (April 25, 1535). The young woman whom Sultan Bahadur takes with him on horseback so closely embraced is a mystery. Although there is the well-known love story of Rupmati and Baz Bahadur, the Sultan of Malwa, no such story has survived for Sultan Bahadur. - Image size 33 × 19.2 cm; page size 36.9 × 24 cm.	B I: 303 P I: 132	ʿamal: Bhūra chihra nāmī: Bhīmjīv	Cincinnati Art Museum (1947.581)
?		When Humayun's troops were in front of Champaner in 1535, Sultan Bahadur had the city set on fire and fled to Cambay himself.	B I: 307 P I: 134	ʿamal: Dharm Dās	Los Angeles County Museum of Art, M.78.9.6
?		Shortly before Humayun is about to set off for Badakhshan on a campaign against his brother Mirza Kamran and is still standing in the room for the water jugs, a white cock sits on his shoulder. Humayun interprets this as an auspicious sign for the upcoming battles. June 1548. – Image size 32.7 × 19 cm.	B I: 525 P I: 274	k. A.	unknown whereabouts
23		In a battle against his brother Mirza Kamran outside Kabul (ca. Nov. 1550), the head of Qaracha Khan is brought to Humayun. Qaracha Khan had defected to Mirza Kamran and taken many men with him. Humayun was supported by reinforcements sent to them by Mirza Sulayman's wife. – Folio size 36.8 × 24.4 cm; image size 31.4 × 19.7 cm.	B I: 570 P I: 304	ʿamal: Bhura chihra nāmī: Miskīn	Philadelphia Museum of Art (1947-49-1)
?		Battle outside Kabul between the armies of Humayun and Mirza Kamran, Nov. 1550. When the latter realizes that he will not be able to hold his position, he flees over the Badpaj Pass. Mirza Kamran can be seen at the top between the rocks below the dromedary, his brother Humayun a little further down in the picture wearing golden armor. The dromedary in the background possibly refers to the end of the battle, when Humayun sees two camels without a guide, laden with chests. He fetches the two animals himself, and when the chests are opened, they contain the books from the royal library, which had been lost in one of the previous battles.	B I: 570–571	ʿamal: Mahesh chihra nāmī: Padārat(h)	Toronto, Agha Khan Museum of Islamic Art, AKM 133
?		The fratricidal struggle continues. On November 20, 1551, Mirza Kamran and Afghan fighters attack Humayun's camp at night. The latter was victorious, but his brother Mirza Hindal, who had fought on his side, was killed. Mirza Kamran manages to escape again.	B I: 582 P I:312	k. A.	Teheran, Golestan Palace Library No. 2253
?		At the end of December 1551, the nine-year-old Akbar receives all the servants and the Jagir Ghazni of his deceased uncle Mirza Hindal, so that he "may become accustomed to the administration of the whole through the administration of a part." The names of the 14 important personalities who passed from the service of M. Hindal to Akbar are listed individually; the chief supervisor was the Atka Khan Khwaja Jalal ud-Din Mahmud. It is possible that the people gathered around the young prince's throne are the Khwaja and the 14 men mentioned. The illustration can only be roughly attributed. It is only published as a detail and without text on the reverse.	B I: 586–587	k. A.	Teheran, Golestan Palace Library No. 2253
?		This picture either immediately precedes the one above and then shows Akbar's arrival in Ghazni, or it depicts his welcome in Kabul, where he was to go shortly after taking over Ghazni. This illustration is only published as a detail.	B I: 587	tarh: Jagan	Teheran, Golestan Palace Library No. 2253
?		Akbar visits the hermit Baba Bilas in Ghazni (Dec. 1551/Jan. 1552). The entrance to a cave is visible behind the hermit. Akbar did not yet have the elephants that can be seen in the picture at this time. - The picture has been cropped and now measures 28.9 × 17.2 cm.	B I: 596/97	k. A.	Dublin, Chester Beatty Library 11A.26
32		This scene with Humayun cannot be assigned to a specific passage in the text. It is possibly an audience in Qandahar January 1554: Khwaja Ghazi, who was in Persia on Humayun's behalf, has just returned from there with gifts.	B evtl. I: 611	ʿamal: Dharm Dās chihra nāmī: Laʿl	Genua, Bruschettini Foundation for Islamic and Asian Art
36		The text on the back of the picture describes the Battle of Machhiwara in May 1555, in which the Mughal army under Bairam Khan defeated the army of the Afghan Sur dynasty. However, Humayun was not present at this battle. Below the miniature is one of the usual summaries of the events in the picture: Ǧang kardan-i laškar-i ḥażrat Ǧannat Āššiyānī bā Afġānān wa fatḥ namūdan dar ḥīnī ki urdū-yi ẓafar-qarīn mutawaǧǧih-i fatḥ-i Hindustān būd. "The battle of His Majesty Jannat Ashiyani's army with the Afghans at the moment when the victorious army was on its way to conquer India." The central figure on horseback is explicitly referred to here as Jannat Ashiyani (= Humayun). labeled. This suggests that the illustration refers more to the Battle of Sirhind, which took place a little later on June 22, 1555 in the presence of Humayun. On this day, the Mughals won a decisive victory over Sikandar Shah Sur, who cleared the way to Delhi.	B I: 626 P I: 345	Atelier-vermerke unleserlich	Cleveland Museum of Art, 1971.77
40		Humayun had died unexpectedly in a fall. His son Jalāl ud-Dīn Muhammad, commonly known by his epithet "Akbar", was crowned on February 14, 1556. However, Bairam Khan, who was instrumental in the reconquest of India, remained in office for the next few years. Three days after the coronation celebrations, Akbar held a large assembly to which Shah Abu 'l-Maʿali was also invited. As he had been a close confidant of Humayun, he assumed that he now also had a special position at court. According to Abu 'l-Fazl, this misjudgment caused him to behave so inappropriately that he was arrested and taken to a prison in Lahore. He was able to escape from there, but there was a bad end, cf. picture no. 114. The person in the center of the picture, to Akbar's left, is undoubtedly Bairam Khan.	B II: 28–29	ṭarḥ: Basāwan ʿamal: Shankar	Art Institute of Chicago, 1919.898
1st year of Akbar's reign (1556–1557)
45		In the Second Battle of Panipat on November 5, 1556, the Mughal army fought against the troops of ʿAdil Shah Sur under the leadership of his commander Hemu. The death of Hemu, who is hit in the eye by an arrow while riding his elephant, finally leads to victory for the Mughals. The illustration is most likely the left half of a double-page composition. The right-hand side probably shows Hemu on his elephant.	B II: 58–64	ṭarḥ: Kānhā ʿamal: Bandī	Melbourne, National Gallery of Victoria, Felton Bequest 1976 (AS24-1976)
2nd year of Akbar's reign (1557–1558)
?		No sooner had the army of ʿAdil Shah Sur been defeated than another scion of the Sur dynasty had to be fought: Sikandar Sur threatened the empire in the area north of Amritsar. As the Mughal army advanced, Sikandar retreated to the fortress of Mankot in the Siwaliks, where he withstood the siege for six months. On July 24, 1557, he surrendered after he was officially accepted into the imperial service through the intercession of Bairam Khan. He was granted a jagir in Bihar, but his son remained as a hostage at the Mughal court. The illustration is covered on the reverse with 19th century calligraphy; there is therefore no text to facilitate classification. The identification of the scene with the end of the siege of Mankot was made by assigning various elements: a fortress in the mountains from which palanquins and other things are being carried, Akbar's very youthful appearance and Bairam Khan with his special headgear from the time of Humayun, whose gestures fit an intercession. The image is damaged and cropped and measures 34 × 20.5 cm. There is no other event within the time frame in question that fits here.	B II: 90–91	k. A.	unknown whereabouts
19th regnal year (1574–1575)
x		This miniature refers to Akbar's journey to the eastern provinces to subdue the Sultan of Bengal, Da'ud Khan Kararani. The outward journey is made from Agra by boat on the Yamuna to Patna, where the court and army arrive after six weeks on August 4, 1574. Abu 'l-Fazl gives a very precise description of the boats, which were all decorated with animal heads on the prow. It is precisely these boats that can be seen in the illustration. Akbar's age at the time, 32, also matches his appearance in the picture. Nevertheless, the classification of the picture is problematic. The corresponding text passage can be found in Akbar-nāma III: 120-135 and thus in the part of the manuscript that is in the Victoria and Albert Museum. Since there is no evidence that an illustration from this part of the manuscript is missing, the affiliation to the 1st Akbar-nāma can only be valid to a limited extent. This is probably a very early miniature that was not added later, when the complete work had reached its final form. - Image size 34 × 20.5 cm.	B III: 120–135	k. A.	unknown whereabouts
23rd year of Akbar's reign (1578–1579)
?		This is the only illustration from the 1st Akbar-nāma that refers to a text passage after the end of the Victoria and Albert manuscript in September 1577. It shows Akbar on a qamargha chase When the animals were rounded up after about four days, Akbar had a mystical experience. In gratitude for this divine grace, Akbar orders the release of the animals. - Image size 30.6 × 18.5 cm.	B III: 345–347	k.a.	London, British Library, Johnson Album 8, 4

== Illustrations of the 1st Akbar-nāma in the Victoria & Albert Museum ==
No.	Image	Depicted event	Found at Beveridge (B) and in the Persian edition (P)	Painter	Inventory number
5th regnal year (1560–1561)
		Hier beginnt der Text der Seiten im Victoria and Albert-Museum. In der zentralen goldenen Kartusche des illuminierten Seitenkopfes steht die Überschrift des Kapitels.	B II: 186 P II: 121, Zeile 8	k. A.	IS. 2:1-1896
82		Akbar personally helps catch a cheetah for the first time.	B II:186–7 P II: 121–2	tarh: Tulsī ʿamal: Narāyan	IS. 2:2-1896
83		After the failed rebellion of Akbar's regent Bairam Khan, Akbar sets off by ship from Delhi to Agra.	B II: 187 P II: 122	tarh: Tulsī ʿamal: Narāyan	IS. 2:3-1896
84		Akbar's mother in the ship on the way to Agra.	B II: 187 P II: 122	tarh: Tulsī ʿamal: Durga	IS. 2:4-1896
85		Assassination of Bairam Khan by Afghans in revenge for the defeat in the Battle of Machhiwara. January 31, 1561.	B II: 201–2 P II: 131	tarh: Tulsī ʿamal: Tiriyyā	IS. 2:5-1896
86		Bairam Khan's wife and his four-year-old son ʿAbd ar-Rahim are brought to safety.	B II: 203 P II: 132	Mukund	IS. 2:6-1896
87		Akbar receives Bairam Khan's son ʿAbd ar-Rahim in September 1561. The young servants next to and behind the emperor are the sons of Amirs and Mansabdars, who carry the qūr: bow, quiver, shield and sword. They are also present at all rides and also take several standards with them, which are wrapped in red cloth. The standards and the qūr are considered insignia of kingship, as is the sāyabān or āftābgīr, which is held by the servant in the blue robe at the top right. This protects the ruler from the rays of the sun. Abu 'l-Fazl gives a description in Ā'īn-i Akbarī.	B II:203 P II: 132	ʿamal: Anant	IS. 2:7-1896
88		Wedding celebration for Baqi Muhammad Khan, the son of Akbar's nurse Maham Anaga. (On a double page with 89.)	B II:205 P II: 133	tarh: Laʿl ʿamal: Banwalī Khurd	IS. 2:8-1896
89		Wedding celebration for Akbar's milk brother Baqi Muhammad Khan. Maham Anaga seated, an absolute oddity, on Akbar's right. The two men on the right, one older, one younger, are greeting Akbar with a taslīm. To do this, the back of the right hand is placed on the ground. As they stand up, the arm is raised and the palm of the hand is placed on the top of the head. This ultimately symbolizes complete submission: one offers oneself as a sacrifice.	B II: 205 P II: 133	tarh: Laʿl ʿamal: Sānwala	IS. 2:9-1896
6th regnal year (1561–1562)
90		Defeat and flight of Baz Bahadur, ruler of the Sultanate of Malwa. (Right half of a double-page composition with 91.)	B II: 213 P II: 137	tarh: Jagan ʿamal: Qabūl Chela	IS. 2:10-1896
91		Defeat and escape of Baz Bahadur.	B II: 213 P II: 137	tarh: Jagan ʿamal: Banwālī Kalān	IS. 2:11-1896
92		Battle in Jaunpur against the Afghans of the Sūr dynasty.	B II: 216 P II: 139	tarh: Kānhā ʿamal: Khīman Sangtarāsh	IS. 2:12-1896
93		Victory of the Uzbek Mughal general ʿAli Quli Khan over the Afghans in Jaunpur on the banks of the Gomti.	B II: 216 P II: 139	tarh: Kānhā ʿamal: Banwālī Khurd	IS. 2:13-1896
94		On an express march to Malwa, Akbar passes the fortress of Gagron. The governor of the castle voluntarily hands him the keys without a fight.	B II: 218 P II: 140	tarh: keine Angabe ʿamal: Mādhav Kalān	IS. 2:14-1896
95		Akbar's milk brother Adham Khan, who had arbitrarily distributed the spoils after the victory over Baz Bahadur, shows Akbar his subservience. A cheetah wearing a blindfold can be seen at the bottom of the picture. Abu 'l-Fazl explains in the Ā'īn-i Akbarī that this kept the cheetahs quiet until they were actually used.	B II: 219 P II: 141	Khem Karan	IS. 2:15-1896
96		Adham Khan organizes a feast for Akbar in Sarangpur, where he presents the spoils from the campaign against Baz Bahadur - including the dancers he originally wanted to keep for himself.	B II: 221 P II: 142–3	tarh: Kesav Kalān ʿamal: Dharmdās	IS. 2:16-1896
97		On the way back from Sarangpur to Agra, the Mughal court encounters a tigress with five cubs near Narwar. Akbar confronts her alone and strikes her down with a sword blow. The five cubs are killed by the attendants. (Right half of a double-page composition with 98.)	B II: 222 P II: 144	tarh: Basāwan ʿamal: Tārā Kalān nāmī chihra: Basāwan.	IS. 2:17-1896
98		Fight against tigers near Narwar.	B II: 223 P II: 144	tarh: Basāwan ʿamal: Sarwan.	IS. 2:18-1896
99		Hunting by Akbar in the area around Agra.	B II: 226	tarh: Basāwan ʿamal: Dharmdās	IS. 2:24-1896
100		ʿAli Quli Khan Zaman and his brother Bahadur Khan make gifts to Akbar, which include some extraordinary elephants that are mentioned by name. (Right half of a double-page composition with 101.).	B II: 229 P II: 148	tarh: Kesav rang āmīz: Chetar	IS. 2:19-1896
101		ʿAli Quli Khan Zaman and Bahadur Khan deliver their tribute payments (peshkash) to Akbar in Kara on the Ganges, July 1561.	B II: 229 P II: 148	tarh: Kesav Kalān rang āmīz: Chetar	IS. 2:20-1896
102		Akbar fights on the Musth elephant Hawa'i against the elephant Ranbagh. Atka Khan, Currently the highest minister, he tries to dissuade Akbar from the dangerous fight by shouting and pleading. (Right half of a double-page composition with 103.)	B II: 234 P II: 151	tarh: Basāwan ʿamal: Chetar	IS. 2:21-1896
103		When Ranbagh flees over a bridge of boats, Hawa'i runs after him.	B II: 234	keine Zuschreibung	IS. 2:22-1896
104		Akbar in Ajmer at the grave of Muʿin ud-Din Chishti.	B II: 243	tarh: Basāwan ʿamal: Ikhlās chihra nāmī: Nānhā	IS. 2:23-1896
7th regnal year (1562–1563)
105		Battle for the fortress of Merta in the territory of Rai Maldev Rathor, ruler of Marwar.	B II: 250 P II: 162	tarh: Mukund ʿamal: Khīman Sangtarāsh	IS. 2:25-1896
106		Nach der Eroberung von Bijagarh FortAfter the conquest of Bijagarh Fort and Burhanpur by the Mughal troops under Pir Muhammad, an attack by Baz Bahadur and the army of Khandesh threatens. Against the advice of his men, who would rather bring their spoils from the last battles to safety, Pir Muhammad insists on fighting Baz Bahadur. The Mughal troops are outnumbered, flee and try to reach safety on the other side of the Narbada. Pir Muhammad drowns in the process.	B II: 259 P II: 168	tarh: Miskīnā ʿamal: Paras	IS. 2:26-1896
107		A high-ranking envoy of Shah Tahmasp I conveys his condolences on the death of Humayun and congratulations on Akbar's accession to the throne. (Right half of a double-page composition with 108.)	B II: 262 P II: 170	tarh: Laʿl ʿamal: Nand, Sohn von Rāmdās	IS. 2:27-1896
108		Sayyid Beg, the Safavid envoy, has brought noble horses, precious fabrics and various rarities as gifts.	B II: 262 P II: 170	tarh: Laʿl ʿamal: Ibrāhīm Kahār	IS. 2:28-1896
109		Adham Khan has Atka Khan, the highest vizier in the empire, murdered in the audience hall because he is jealous of his high position. Akbar personally strikes his milk brother down with a punch and orders him to be thrown from the gallery of the audience hall. As Adham Khan is not yet dead after the first fall, he is brought back up and thrown down a second time. May 16, 1562.	B II:272 P II: 176	tarh: Miskīn ʿamal: Shankar nāmī chihra: Miskīn	IS. 2:29-1896
110		Munʿim Khan, who had stirred up Adham Khan's jealousy of Atka Khan, flees after his murder for fear of punishment. He wants to seek safety in Kabul. After a six-day journey, however, he is arrested and brought back to court.	B II: 279 P II: 180	tarh: Jagan ʿamal: Nāmān	IS. 2:30-1896
8th regnal year (1563–1564)
111		Victory over Adam, Sultan of the Gakhar clan in the Pothohar region.	B II: 299–300 P II: 193	tarh: Tulsī ʿamal: Bhawānī chihra: Sānwala	IS. 2:31-1896
112		Sharaf ud-Din Husayn, a brother-in-law of the emperor, had fallen out of favor. Akbar therefore assigned his Jagir in Ajmer Husayn Quli Khan. Sharaf ud-Din Husayn's deputy in Ajmer, Tarkhan Diwana, pictured in the yellow robe, reluctantly surrenders the fortress to Husayn Quli Khan after a short siege.	B II: 304–5 P II: 196	tarh: Laʿl ʿamal: Nāmān chihra nāmī: Mukund	IS. 2:32-1896
113		Failed assassination attempt on Akbar in Delhi. The assassin is killed immediately.	B II: 313 P II: 201	tarh: Jagan ʿamal: Bhawānī Kalān chihra nāmī: Mādhav	IS. 2:33-1896
9th regnal year (1564–1565)
114		Abu'l Maʿali, formerly a confidant of Humayun, had fallen out of favor under Akbar and had sought refuge in Kabul with Akbar's ten-year-old half-brother Mirza Muhammad Hakim and his influential mother Mah Chuchak Begam. His high lineage prompted Mah Chuchak to marry him off to her daughter. However, in his quest for unrestricted rule, Abu'l Maʿali murdered the Begam and some of her advisors just a few months later and took control of the Mirza. Mirza Sulayman, formerly appointed by Humayun as governor of Badakhshan, intervenes in Kabul. Mirza Muhammad Hakim finally had Abu 'l-Maʿali executed.	B II: 321 P II: 207	tarh: Jagan ʿamal: Asīr	IS. 2:34-1896
115		Rani Durgavati, the ruler of Garha in northern Gondwana, leads her troops into battle against the Mughals and finally kills herself with her dagger when her defeat is foreseeable. On this page you can clearly see the text fields that have been pasted on later. (Right half of a double-page composition with 116.)	B II: 330 P II: 214	tarh: Kesav ʿamal: Jagannāth	IS. 2:35-1896
116		Khwaja ʿAbd al-Majid Asaf Khan, one of Akbar's most important commanders, fights in the battle against Rani Durgavati.	B II: 330–31 P II: 214	tarh: Kesav Kalān ʿamal: Narsingh	IS. 2:36-1896
117		Khwaja Muʿazzam, a half-brother of Akbar's mother, has killed his wife. When Akbar (in the green robe, center left) confronts him, a servant of Khwaja appears to be about to attack the ruler. One of Akbar's followers beats him to it and cuts off the servant's head.	B II: 337 P II: 218	k. A.	IS. 2:37-1896
118		Khwaja Muʿazzam and the constant companions of his drinking bouts are tied up and taken to the river, where they are drowned. Khwaja Muʿazzam survives and is later imprisoned in the Gwalior fortress, where he eventually dies.	B II: 337 P II: 218–19	k. A.	IS. 2:38-1896
119		On the way to Malwa, Akbar had wild elephants captured to be tamed (July 1564). The real aim of the hunting expedition, however, was to penetrate southwards without causing too much of a stir and to nip the rebellion of ʿAbdullah Khan Uzbeg, the governor of the province, in the bud.	B II: 342–43	tarah: Mahesh ʿamal: Kesav Khurd	IS. 2:40-1896
120		Akbar watches the wild elephants he has just captured being tamed.	B II: 342–43	tarah: Laʿl ʿamal: Sānwala	IS. 2:39-1896
121		With 300 men, Akbar defeats the numerically superior troops of ʿAbdullah Khan Uzbeg. He himself has escaped, but his drums and standards have been seized and are presented to the emperor here.	B II: 348 P II: 227	tarah: Mahesh ʿamal: Anant	IS. 2:41-1896
122		Mirza Sulayman of Badakhshan had tried to take control of Akbar's brother Mirza Muhammad Hakim. However, the latter manages to escape and asks his brother for help. Akbar's troops therefore move north, first liberating the fortress of Jalalabad and killing Qambar ʿAli, the commander of the castle appointed by M. Sulayman.	B II: 363 P II: 240–41	tarh: Laʿl ʿamal: Rāmdās	IS. 2:42-1896
123		Mirza Sulayman ends the siege of Kabul and flees from the advancing Mughal army.	B II: 263–64 P II: 241	ʿamal: Bhagwān nāmī chihra: Mādhav	IS. 2:49-1896
10th regnal year (1565–1566)
124		Several elephants were killed during a hunting trip in the area of Narwar Fort and Karera captured and driven to a nearby fortress. To ensure that they have enough water, Akbar has a large pool dug out and filled with water. (Right half of a double-sided composition with 125.)	B II: 371 P II: 245	tarh: Laʿl ʿamal: Harī	IS. 2:43-1896
125		Captive elephants in the castle courtyard, for which Akbar had a water basin specially built.	B II: 371 P II: 245	tarh: Laʿl ʿamal: Khem	IS. 2: 44-1896
126		Construction of the Agra Fort (1565). (Right half of a double-page composition with 127.)	B II: 373 P II: 247	tarh: Miskīnā ʿamal: Sarwan.	IS. 2:45-1896
127		Construction of the fortress of Agra.	B II: 373 P II: 247	tarh: Miskīn ʿamal: Tulsī Khurd.	IS. 2:46-1896
128		In order to put down a rebellion of Uzbek Amirs, led by ʿAli Quli Khan Zaman and his brother Bahadur Khan, Akbar and his army set off eastwards. Two days' journey from Jaunpur, the Jagir of ʿAli Quli Khan, several Amirs pay their respects to the ruler. Asaf Khan takes the opportunity to present Akbar with some of the spoils of war from the conquest of the Gond Empire the previous month. In the background is Jaunpur on the river Gomti. July 1565 (right half of a double-page composition with 129.).	B II: 379	tarh: keine Angabe ʿamal: Nānhā	IS. 2:51-1896
129		Asaf Khan presents the treasures from Garha. According to Akbar-nāma, the presentation of the tribute gifts took place two days' journey before Jaunpur. However, the short informal note on the left edge of the picture indicates that the fortress in the background is Jaunpur.	B II: 379	tarh: Miskīnā ʿamal: Bhagwān	IS. 2:52-1896
130		Concerned that his embezzlement of a considerable portion of the spoils of war from Garha would be discovered, Asaf Khan flees the court, which is still encamped in Jaunpur at this time. Akbar sends Shujaʿat Khan with some men to pursue him. As they cross the Ganges in boats at Kara, they are fired upon by Asaf Khan's followers.	B II: 383	tarh: Tulsī Kalān ʿamal: Jagjīvan	IS. 2:47-1896
131		Im Dezember 1565 treffen sich Munʿim Khan (Khan Khanan) und ʿAli Quli Khan Zaman, um eine Versöhnung mit Akbar auszuhandeln. Damit es keinesfalls unerwünschte Zuhörer gibt, treffen sie sich in Booten auf dem Ganges, in der Mitte zwischen Narainpur und Buxar.	B II: 386	tarh: Kesav ʿamal: Banwālī Khurd	IS. 2:48-1896
132		ʿAli Quli Khan still refuses to pay his respects to Akbar personally and instead sends Ibrahim Khan and his mother to the court, who bring elephants as gifts. While the mother waits in the chambers of the imperial harem, Ibrahim Khan appears before Akbar with a sword and a shroud around his neck as a sign of his - and ʿAli Quli Khan's - submission. He forgives ʿAli Quli Khan's insubordinate behavior and orders that Ibrahim Khan's sword and shroud be removed.	B II: 388 P II: 260	tarh: Basāvan ʿamal: Māh Muhammad	IS. 2:50-1896
133		Discussion between Bahadur Khan and Akbar's negotiator Mir Muʿizz al-Mulk about a possible remission of punishment for ʿAli Quli Khan Zaman. This illustration by Farrukh Beg seems to have been originally intended for a different manuscript. The erased text at the top and bottom was, as is still visible, surrounded by a cloud shape and was not, as in all other illustrations for this 1st Akbar-nāma, in rectangular panels. The works of Farrukh Beg are recognizable by his distinctive Persian style.	B II: 389	ʿamal: Farrukh Beg	IS. 2:96-1896
134		During the pursuit of ʿAli Quli Khan, the Mughal troops fall into the hands of the enemy's boats and equipment.	B II: 395 P II: 266	tarh: Kānhā ʿamal: Mukhlis	IS. 2:97-1896
11th regnal year (1566–1567)
12th regnal year (1567–1568)
135		In March 1567, Akbar had a huge qamargha held in the province of Lahore with thousands of drivers, which is described as the largest of all time. In addition to the hunt itself, a simultaneous event is depicted in the miniature at the top right: The punishment of Hamid Bakari, a rider in the bodyguard. He had shot another member of the court with an arrow and was to be beheaded. However, as the beheading did not succeed, his head was shaved as punishment and he had to ride around the hunting field sitting backwards on a donkey. (Right half of a double-page illustration with 136.)	B II: 417–18 P II: 282	tarh wa nāmī chihra: Miskīnā ʿamal: Sarwan	IS. 2:55-1896
136		The painters have depicted the herded animals with great precision, so that the double-page spread also provides information about the fauna of northern India in the 16th century. Among others, markhor, urial, blackbuck, ilgai, chital, golden jackal, and mall Indian civet can be seen.	B II: 417–18 P II: 282	tarh: Miskīnā ʿamal: Mansūr	IS. 2:56-1896
137		Asaf Khan and his brother Wazir Khan had briefly joined ʿAli Quli Khan and his brother Bahadur Khan, but wanted to separate from them again. During an escape attempt, Asaf Khan was captured and held in a palanquin on an elephant. His bound hands can be seen in the illustration. Wazir Khan manages to free his brother together with his son and some followers. Because Wazir Khan's son fought so bravely, he was given the honorary title of "Bahadur Khan".	B II: 419 P II: 283	tarh: Jagan ʿamal: Narāyan chihra nāmī: Mādhav Khurd	IS. 2:53-1896
138		When Akbar returns to Lahore after completing the Qamargha, two men from his entourage drown in the river Ravi.	B II: 419	tarh: Laʿl ʿamal: Sānwala	IS. 2:54-1896
139		In Lahore, Akbar learns that the Uzbeks around ʿAli Quli Khan are revolting again. He therefore hurries to Agra with his troops and camps en route in Thanesar, which lies in the immediate vicinity of the mythical battle site of Kurukshetra. Hindu devotees gathered there every year, generously distributing alms. Since the share of the pious gifts depends not least on a favorable storage location, a fierce dispute broke out between two groups of Sannyasins, which Abu 'l-Fazl referred to as Kur and Pūrī. Even before this, the outnumbered Puris are said to have asked the Mughal ruler for support. During his stay, Akbar (pictured above, on horseback) sends his own men into battle and helps the Puris to victory. The leader of the Kur is killed in the process. April 1567 (right half of a double-page composition with 140.)	B II: 424 P II: 287	tarh: Basāwan ʿamal: Tārā Kalān	IS. 2:61-1896
140		Only foothills of the battle clash extend to this part of the double-page illustration. Next to the fighting sannyasis, who belong to two different Dashanami groups, some Nāth yogis can also be seen here, recognizable by their wide coats, sometimes also hats or a string over their shoulders with hanging coloured ribbons.	B II: 424 P II: 287	tarh: Basāwan ʿamal: Āsī, barādar-i Miskīnā	IS. 2:62-1896
141		When ʿAli Quli Khan and his troops approach, Mirza Yusuf Khan, fiefdom holder of Kannauj, flees to the fortress of Shergarh, which Sher Shah Sur had built on the banks of the Ganges in place of the old Kannauj. (Originally intended as the right half of a double-sided composition with 142.)	B II: 425–426 P II: 289	tarh: Kānhā ʿamal: Nandī walad-i Rāmdās	IS. 2:64-1896
142		Mirza Yusuf Khan flees to the fortress of Shergarh (Kannauj) as ʿAli Quli Khan and his troops approach. This illustration was no doubt planned as the left half of a double-page composition with 141; it is actually used as the right half of a double-page with 143.	B II: 425–426 P II: 289	tarh: Kānhā ʿamal: Nānhā	IS. 2:57-1896
143		In pursuit of ʿAli Quli Khan, Akbar crosses the Ganges from west to east on an elephant.	B II: 427 P II: 290	tarh: Jagan ʿamal: Nand Gwālīārī	IS. 2:58-1896
144		Akbar's troops chase after ʿAli Quli Khan. (With 145 on a double page.)	B II: 427–428 P II: 290–291	Nand Gwālīārī	IS. 2:59-1896
145		Akbar had to cross the Ganges again to confront ʿAli Quli Khan and his brother Bahadur Khan. This time the imperial troops pass the river at Manikpur. Akbar leads the elephant himself and uses an Ankus for this.	B II: 428	ʿamal: Ikhlās nāmī: Madhav	IS. 2:60-1896
146		The head of ʿAli Quli Khan Zaman lies under a tree and is later found there. (Mit Bild 147 auf einer Doppelseite.)	B II: 433	tarh wa nāmī chihra: Kesav Kalān ʿamal: Chetar Mūnī	IS. 2:63-1896
147		Chitranand, one of the elephants of the Mogularmee, who is currently in a Musth phase, charges full force into a rebel elephant, Udiya, who collapses dead.	B II: 432 P II: 294	k. A.	IS. 2:115-1896
148		Bahadur Khan as a prisoner before Akbar.	B II: 432 P II: 294	tarh: Kesav Kalān ʿamal: Mādhav Kalān	IS. 2:65-1896
149		After the victorious battle against ʿAli Quli Khan and his brother, Akbar and his troops set off towards Benares to capture further supporters of the Uzbek rebels. In the process, the Mughals also capture Bahadur Khan's wives and eunuch, Khwaja ʿAlam. The latter is taken over as Akbar's personal servant, but seizes the first opportunity to flee, which is short-lived. Here he is presented to Akbar in the fortress of Kara.	B II: 435 P II: 297	k. A.	IS. 2:89-1896
150		Punishment of the supporters of ʿAli Quli Khan.	B II: 435 P II: 297	tarh: Miskīnā ʿamal: Banwālī Kalān	IS. 2:90-1896
151		Siege of the Rajput fortress of Chittorgarh, the most important castle of Mewar, which was in the hands of Udai Singh II of the Sisodia clan. The Mogularmee surrounds the fortress with several units, one of which has the task of constructing covered passages (sābāṭ), in the protection of which the soldiers can advance to the fortress. The workers can be seen at work at the bottom left of the picture. True to the text, the miniature shows the fences covered with rawhide to protect the construction workers from the arrows of the enemy. (Right half of a double-page composition with 152.)	B II: 467 P II: 320–321	tarh: Miskīnā ʿamal: Sarwan	IS. 2:66-1896
152		During the siege of the fortress of Chittor, a troop unit under the direct command of Akbar (bottom left in the picture) attempts to excavate tunnels in the rock under the walls of the castle. The entrance to one such tunnel can be seen to the left of the center of the picture. The plan was to fill two tunnels with large quantities of gunpowder in order to blow up the castle wall and penetrate the resulting passage. However, a serious accident occurred on December 17, 1567, as the attackers who had been standing by stormed into the fortress after the first explosive charge had detonated. Around two hundred Mughal soldiers are killed by the second explosion.	B II: 468–469	tarh: Miskīnā ʿamal: Bhūra	IS. 2:67-1896
153		After the sābāts had been completed and several breakthroughs through the fortress walls had cleared the way, the soldiers of the Mughal army were able to penetrate the castle. In the second half of the night, Akbar succeeded in shooting Jaimal, the commander of the castle. A few hours later, on February 24, 1568, the fortress fell into the hands of the Mughals.	B II: 472	k. A.	IS. 2:68-1896
154		The Rajput ruler Udai Singh II had already taken refuge in Udaipur before the siege. The death of his commander Jaimal]] meant the final fall of the fortress. According to Rajput custom, the women were burnt in the Jauhar and the men bravely threw themselves into their last battle. The picture above shows the burning women's chambers. The blank text panel with translucent remnants of writing once again testifies to the subsequent alteration of the manuscript.	B II: 472	k. A.	IS. 2:69-1896
13th regnal year (1568–1569)
155		After visiting the tomb of his father Humayun and various shrines, Akbar holds a qamargha hunt in Palam. (Right half of a double-page composition with 156.)	B II: 489–490 P II: 334	tarh: Mukund ʿamal: Manohar	IS. 2:71-1896
156		Qamargha in the Delhi area.	B II: 489–490 P II: 334	tarh: Mukund ʿamal: Narāyan	IS. 2:70-1896
157		On February 8, 1569, the Mughal army reached the strategically important Ranthambore Fort of the Rajput prince Surjan Hada, a vassal of Rana Udai Singh II Abū'l Fazl reports that Akbar climbs a mountain the day after his arrival and inspects the location of the castle. (Akbar above right in white robe.)	B II: 491	tarh: Khem Karan ʿamal: Khem Karan	IS. 2:73-1896
14th regnal year (1569–1570)
158		In order to take the Ranthambhor fortress under fire, cannons are transported with great effort to a mountain opposite.	B II: 494	tarh: Miskīnā ʿamal: Paras	IS. 2:72-1896
159		Siege and bombardment of Ranthambhor.	B II: 494	tarh: Miskīnā ʿamal: Bhūra	IS. 2:74-1896
160		On March 21, 1569, Raja Surjan submits and presents Akbar with gifts and the keys to the fortress.	Ü II: 495	tarh: Mukund ʿamal: Shankar	IS. 2:75-1896
161		Akbar (on horseback) in the fortress of Ranthambhor.	B II: 495–496	tarh: Laʿl ʿamal: Shankar	IS. 2:76-1896
162		Birth of Salim, later Jahangir, on August 30, 1569 in Fatehpur Sikri. The painter Kesav Kalān provides a distant view of the landscape at the top of the picture, with a group of houses correctly reduced in perspective. This type of landscape depiction in the background became very popular in Mughal painting in the 1590s.	B II: 503–504	tarh: Kesav Kalān ʿamal: Dharmdās	IS. 2:78-1896
163		In Agra, Akbar receives news of the birth of his son. Following an old custom, he waits several weeks to see his long-awaited son.	B II: 503–505	tarh: Kesav Kalān ʿamal: Chitra	IS. 2:79-1896
164		In the event that his prayers for a son were answered, Akbar had vowed to make a pilgrimage from Agra to the tomb of Mu'in ud-Din Chishti in Ajmer. He honored this vow six months after the birth of his progenitor. On January 20, 1570, Akbar set off and reached Ajmer on February 4, 1570.	B II: 510–511 P II: 350	tarh: Basāwan ʿamal: Nand Gwālīārī	IS. 2:77-1896
15th regnal year (1570–1571)
165		Birth of Akbar's son Murad on June 7, 1570.	B II: 514	ʿamal: Bhūra chihra nāmī: Basāwan	IS. 2:80-1896
166		Some personalities of Nagaur have approached Akbar and invite him to a banquet in the name of the governor, Khan Kilan.	B II: 517 P II: 357	chihra nāmī: Basāwan Farrukh	IS. 2:81-1896
167		Akbar leaves a silted up pond near Nagaur, the Kukar Talao, clean. (Right half of a double-sided composition with 168.)	B II: 517	tarh: Kesav Kalān ʿamal: Chetarmūnī	IS. 2:82-1896
168		Akbar watches the cleaning of the Kukar Talao.	B II: 517	tarh: Kesav Kalān ʿamal: Bhagwān	IS. 2:83-1896
169		On the way from Nagaur to Pakpattan, Akbar hunts wild ass (gorkhar) for the first time. He is traveling on foot and becomes very thirsty in the heat. However, as he is now far away from the water carriers, he cannot drink anything and becomes so weak from thirst that he can no longer speak. Through "divine guidance", the water carriers finally find their way through the desert to Akbar. The picture shows Akbar being handed a jug of water.	B II: 522	ʿamal: Mahesh chihra nāmī: Kesu	IS. 2:84-1896
16th regnal year (1571–1572)
170		During his stay in Pakpattan, he watches fishermen using an unusual fishing technique: they dive and catch the fish with their mouths and hands or spear them with iron spears. The river in the foreground is probably the Satluj, the town in the background Pakpattan.	B II: 526	tarh: Kesav Kalān ʿamal: Chetarmūnī	IS. 2:85-1896
171		On the way from Pakpattan to Lahore, Akbar is killed in Depalpur invited to a feast by his milk brother Mirza ʿAziz Koka. (Right half of a double-page composition with 172.)	B II: 528–529	tarh: Jagan ʿamal: Sūr Dās chihra nāmī: Mādhav	IS. 2:94-1896
172		Abu 'l-Fazl only mentions that Mirza ʿAziz Koka went to great lengths at this feast in April 1571. Another source reports on the extraordinarily lavish gifts for Akbar, which can also be seen on this double-page spread: Arabian and Persian horses, choice elephants with gold and silver chains, golden vessels, throne seats, precious jewels and fabrics from all over the world. The princes, the ladies of the imperial harem, the scholars and officers also received gifts. Illustrations 171 and 172 thus depict very unusual festivities.	B II: 528–529	tarh: Jagan ʿamal: Asīr	IS. 2:95-1896
173		Akbar hunting with cheetahs. The hunt took place either on the way from Dipalpur to Lahore, from Lahore to Hisar or from Hisar to Ajmer. As there are no text panels on the illustrations, the attribution remains vague.	B II: 529–530	tarh: Laʿl ʿamal: Sānwala	IS. 2:92-1896
174		Akbar examines his prey by torchlight.	B II: 529–530	tarh: Laʿl ʿamal: Kesav Khurd	IS. 2:93-1896
175		Akbar had formerly approached a hermit named Salim Chishti, who lived in the village of Sikri, with his request for a successor. After the birth of his two sons Salim and Murad, Akbar ordered the expansion of the village on a grand scale, which was renamed Fatehpur Sikri after the conquest of Gujarat. (Right half of a double-page composition with 176.)	B II: 530–531	tarh: Tulsī ʿamal: Bandī chihra nāmī: Madhav Khurd	IS. 2:91-1896
176		The expansion of Fatehpur Sikri. The elephant gate, Hathi Pol, in the background.	B II: 530–531	tarh: Tulsī ʿamal: Bhawānī	IS. 2:86-1896
17th regnal year (1572–1573)
177		Khan Kalan, a brother of Atka Khan is on the campaign to Gujarat together with other officers. (On a double page with 178.)	B III:6–7 P III: 4	tarh: Miskīnā ʿamal: Kesav Khurd	IS. 2:87-1896
178		In the village of Bhadrajun, some Rajputs pay their respects to Khan Kalan. They pretend to want to convey the subservient greetings of the governor of Sirohi, but one of them thrusts a dagger into the Khan's collarbone as he leaves. The attacker is killed immediately, but Khan Kalan survives the attack.	B III:6–7 P III: 4	tarh: Miskīnā ʿamal: Sarwan	IS. 2:88-1896
179		During the campaign to Gujarat, the imperial army encounters Ibrahim Husayn Mirza and his fighters outside Sarnal, about 65 km north of Vadodara. The site of the battle is overgrown with thorny bushes, Euphorbia antiquorum, so that movement is restricted. The picture illustrates a dangerous situation for Akbar: three enemy horsemen are advancing towards him. Rajah Bhagwant Das attacks one of them with his spear, while the other two threaten Akbar (center, with feather on helmet). The latter bravely rides his horse over a hedge of thorns and confronts them. "By the radiance of the divine light (pers. farr-i īzadī), these two impudent fellows have lost courage and fled." That is why they turn their backs on Akbar. (Right half of a double-sided composition.)	B III: 21 P III: 15	tarh: Laʿl ʿamal: Bābū Naqqāsh	IS. 2:106-1896
180		Ibrahim Husayn Mirza and his army. In the background is the village of Sarnal on the river Mahi. The Mirzas were among the greatest opponents of the Mughals during the conquest of Gujarat.	B III: 20–21 P III: 15	tarh: Laʿl ʿamal: Sānwala	IS. 2:107-1896
181		After the Mughals have conquered various cities in Gujarat, the troops of the Mirzas and Sher Khan besiege Fuladis the city of Patan, which is now also in the hands of the Mughals. Mirza ʿAziz Koka and Qutb ud-Din Muhammad Khan rush to the aid of the besieged and a battle ensues on January 22, 1573. The scene specifically illustrates a passage in the text: Mirza ʿAziz Koka wants to ride to the attack again when Yar Muhammad reaches into the reins to hold him back. (Right half of a double-sided composition with 182.)	B III: 35	tarh: Laʿl ʿamal: Dhanūn	IS. 2:108-1896
182		Only through the special efforts of Qutb ud-Dīn and Mirzā ʿAziz Koka were the Mughals finally able to achieve victory. Sher Khan Fuladi and the Mirzas escape. Patan with the river Sarasvati can be seen in the background. At the bottom left of the picture is a horseman without a helmet with a bandaged hand; this is possibly Shah Muhammad Khan, whose wounding is mentioned in the Tarikh-i Akbari.	B III: 33–36	tarh: Laʿl ʿamal: Manī	IS. 2:109-1896
183		On February 27, 1573, Akbar victoriously enters the fortress of Surat.	B III: 40	Farrūkh Beg	IS. 2:117-1896
18th regnal year (1573–1574)
184		Husayn Quli Khan, a nephew of Bairam Khan, and some other officers surprise Ibrahim Husayn Mirza and his brother Masʿud Husayn in Tulamba near Multan. Masʿud is captured, Ibrahim escapes. (Right half of a double-page composition with 185.)	B III: 53	tarh: Tulsī Kalān ʿamal: Banwārī	IS. 2:104-1896
185		Husayn Quli Khan's attack came as such a surprise to the Mirzas that Masʿud had to send a messenger to fetch his brother back from the hunt. According to Bada'uni, the battle was essentially lost before Ibrahim Mirza returned from the hunt. Although he manages to escape, he dies shortly afterwards during an ambush. The picture above shows the Mirza on the hunt.	B III: 53	tarh wa ʿamal: Khemkaran	IS. 2:105:1896
186		Akbar returns from Gujarat to Fatehpur Sikri and arrives there on June 3, 1573. Soon afterwards Husayn Quli Khan presents Masʿud Mirza and some other prisoners from the Battle of Tulamba. (Right half of a double-page composition with 187.)	B III: 56	ʿamal: Husayn Naqqāsh chihra nāmī: Kesav	IS. 2:113-1896
187		The captured followers of the Mirzas are wrapped in animal skins for the amusement of onlookers. According to Abu 'l-Fazl, these are cowhides with the horns still attached. Bada'uni reports instead that the skins of donkeys, pigs and dogs were pulled over the faces of the almost 300 prisoners. Akbar is said to have immediately ordered her to be freed from this costume.	B III: 56	tarh: Basāwan ʿamal: Mansūr	IS. 2:112-1896
188		Unidentifiable battle scene. Possibly shows a smaller battle on the border of Dungarpur, April/May 1573.	B III: 57–84	tarh: Kesav Kalān ʿamal: Chetarmūnī	IS. 2:116-1896
189		Akbar had transferred the administration of Gujarat to the khan Aʿzam Mirza ʿAziz Koka. However, after the imperial army returned to the capital, Muhammad Husayn Mirza and Sher Khan Fuladi attempted to recapture some of the lost cities and eventually besieged Ahmedabad. The Khan Aʿzam was unable to drive out the besiegers and had to entrench himself. When Akbar learned of the events, he hurried to Ahmedabad with a small army and reached the city after only eleven days on September 2, 1573. Shortly after his arrival, a battle took place, which is probably depicted here. It is not possible to determine exactly which passage of text the painters wanted to illustrate.	B III: 76–86	tarh: Miskīnā ʿamal: Banwālī Khurd	IS. 2:98-1896
190		Muhammad Husayn Mirza gefangen vor Akbar.	B III: 84	tarh: Miskīn ʿamal: Mahesh	IS. 2:99-1896
191		On October 5, 1573, Akbar rides into Fatehpur Sikri in triumph. The picture clearly shows that all his companions were to ride into the capital with spears and lances raised. Part of the Hiran Minar can be seen in the front left of the picture. Akbar is greeted by his three sons with a kornish; the palm of the hand is placed on the forehead and the head is bowed. The three princes are only four, three and one year old at this point, so they are not depicted according to age. (Right half of a double-page composition with 192.)	B III: 91	tarh: Kesav Kalān ʿamal: Nar Singh	IS. 2:110-1896
192		This left half of the double page shows the general activity in the city. The text fields on these two halves of the picture still bear the unrevised text, which is not to be found in today's editions.	B III: 91	tarh: Kesav Kalān ʿamal: Jagjivan	IS. 2:111-1896
19th regnal year (1574–1575)
193		Scene of an unknown battle, probably in Bengal.	B III: 91–250	tarh: Miskīn ʿamal: Āsī	IS. 2:100-1896
20th regnal year (1575–1576)
21st regnal year (1576–1577)
194		On June 20, 1574, Akbar had traveled with a fleet on the Yamuna to Patna, where he arrived on August 4, 1574. The city was quickly captured and the Mughal army made rich booty, but the Sultan of Bengal, Da'ud Khan Karrani, was able to flee. Akbar returned to Fatehpur Sikri and left the pursuit of Da'ud to a few high-ranking officers. The conquest of Bengal, however, proved to be more difficult than expected and there were repeated setbacks, so Akbar decided to lead the army in the east personally. On July 22, 1576, he set off from Fatehpur Sikri, but before he reached Agra, a messenger brought Da'ud's head and a message of victory from Bengal. The picture shows Akbar's prayer of thanks for this victory.	B III: 250	tarh: Laʿl ʿamal: Nand	IS. 2:101-1896
195		A flashback in the text describes the events of the Battle of Rajmahal Due to the rainy season, the country is widely flooded. The Mughal troops have gained the upper hand and driven off the enemy fighters, many of whom have drowned in the rivers. Da'ud Khan, whose horse had gotten stuck in the swamp, is captured and brought before Khān Jahān, who orders his beheading. The depiction of the horses in the foreground from behind is an innovation in Mughal painting and was most likely adopted from European paintings.	B III: 255	tarh: Laʿl ʿamal: Prem Jīv Gujarātī	IS. 2:102-1896
196		The conquest of Idar on 22 February 1577. The text emphasizes that Nur Qilich fought on bravely despite a wound to his hand. He is clearly recognizable in the center of the picture with a white bandage around his left hand.	Ü III: 281	tarh wa ʿamal: Tulsī Kalān	IS. 2:103-1896
22nd regnal year (1577)
197		Various envoys in front of Akbar. The picture cannot be precisely identified. It may combine several scenes from July/August 1577. This illustration is of particular importance for the history of Mughal painting: it is one of the earliest examples of portraits of important personalities in audience scenes. This type of depiction became standard under Akbar's successor Jahangir. The painter Madhav portrayed a total of eight people, some of whose names are noted in the right margin: Raja B(h)agwant Das at the top, Raja Todar Mal below, the two following, barely decipherable names are read by Seyller as Sadiq Khan and Khidmat Rai.	Ü III: 295–6	tarh: Miskīn ʿamal: Sarwan chihra nāmī hasht sūrat: Mādhav	IS. 2:114-1896

== Literature ==
- Abu 'l-Fazl: The Akbar Nāma. Translated from the Persian by H. Beveridge. 3 Bde. Low Price Publications, Delhi 1993. (Repr. Bibliotheca Indica 138. 3 Vols. Asiatic Society of Bengal 1897–1921)
- Abul-Fazl i Mubarak i 'Allámí: The Akbarnámah. Ediert von Agha Ahmad Alī (st. 1873) und ʿAbd ar-Rahīm. 3 Bände. Bibliotheca Indica 79. Asiatic Society of Bengal, Calcutta 1877–1886.
- al-Badāoni: Muntakhabu-t-tawārīkh. Transl. W.H. Lowe. Repr. Renaissance Publishing House, Delhi 1986.
- Milo Cleveland Beach: Early Mughal Painting. Harvard University Press, Cambridge (Massachusetts) und London 1987, ISBN 0-674-22185-0.
- Milo Cleveland Beach: The Imperial Image. Paintings for the Mughal Court. Freer Gallery of Art, Washington D.C. 1981, ISBN 0-934686-37-8.
- Milo Cleveland Beach: The Imperial Image. Paintings for the Mughal Court. Freer Gallery of Art, Arthur M. Sackler Gallery. Mapin Publishing, Washington D.C. u. a. 2012. ISBN 978-1-935677-16-1.
- Linda York Leach: Mughal and other Indian paintings from the Chester Beatty Library. 2 Bde. Scorpion Cavendish, London 1995. ISBN 1-900269-02-3.
- Linda York Leach: Mughal and other Indian paintings from the Chester Beatty Library. 2 Bde. Scorpion Cavendish, London 1995. ISBN 1-900269-02-3.
- Linda York Leach: Pages from an „Akbarnama". In: Rosemary Crill, Susan Stronge, Andrew Topsfield (Hrsg.): Arts of Mughal India. Studies in Honour of Robert Skelton. Victoria and Albert Museum/Mapin Publishing, London/Ahmedabad, India 2004, ISBN 978-1-890206-71-0, S. 43–55.
- Jeremiah P. Losty und Malini Roy: Mughal India. Art, Culture and Empire. The British Library, London 2012.
- Pratapaditya Pal: Indian Painting. A Catalogue of the Los Angeles County Museum of Art Collection. Los Angeles County Museum of Art, Los Angeles 1993. ISBN 0-8109-3465-5
- John F. Richards: The New Cambridge History of India. 1.5. The Mughal Empire. Cambridge University Press 1992.
- Samsam-ud-daula Shāh Nawāz Khān and his son Abdul Hayy: The Maāthir-ul-umara. 2 Bände. Translated by H. Beveridge. Low Price Publications, Delhi 1999. (Repr. 1952) ISBN 81-7536-159-X.
- Geeti Sen: Paintings from the Akbar Nama: A Visual Cronicle of Mughal India. Lustre Press Pvt Ltd, Calcutta u. a. 1984.
- John Seyller: Scribal Notes on Mughal Manuscript Illustrations. In: Artibus Asiae 48 3/4 (1987) S. 247–277, insbesondere S. 295.
- John Seyller: Codicological Aspects of the Victoria and Albert Museum Akbarnāma and Their Historical Implications. In: Art Journal (Winter 1990), S. 379–387.
- John Seyller: The Inspection and Valuation of Manuscripts in the Imperial Mughal Library. In: Artibus Asiae 57 3/4 (1997), S. 243–349.
- Susan Stronge: Painting for the Mughal Emperor. The Art of the Book 1560–1660. V&A Publications, London 2002, ISBN 1-85177-358-4.
