= Shah Abu'l Ma'ali =

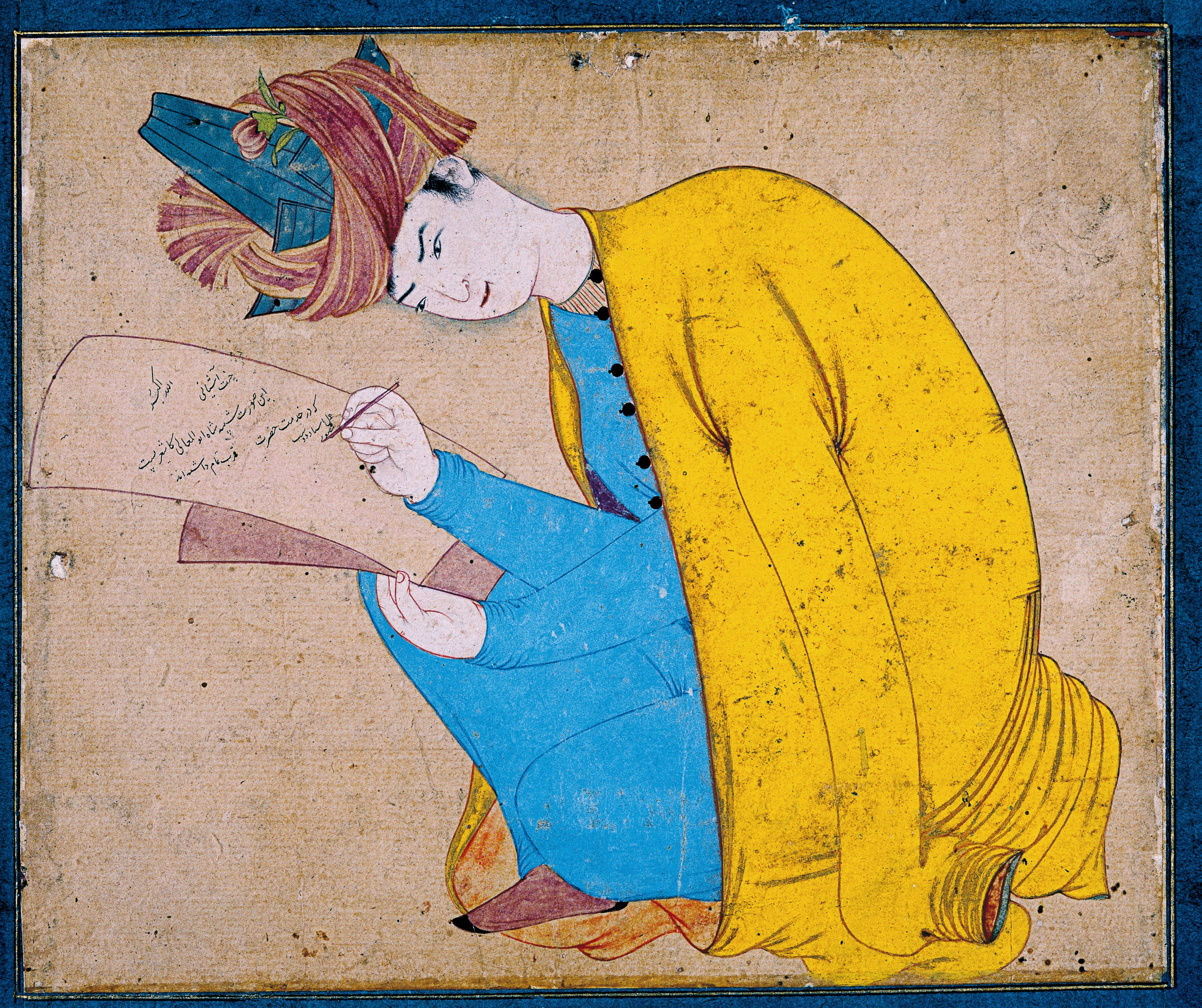
A Persian miniature of Shah Abu'l Ma‘ali, as a scholar, by Dust Muhammad, 1556–64. He wears the Tāj-i 'Izzat headdress of Humayun.

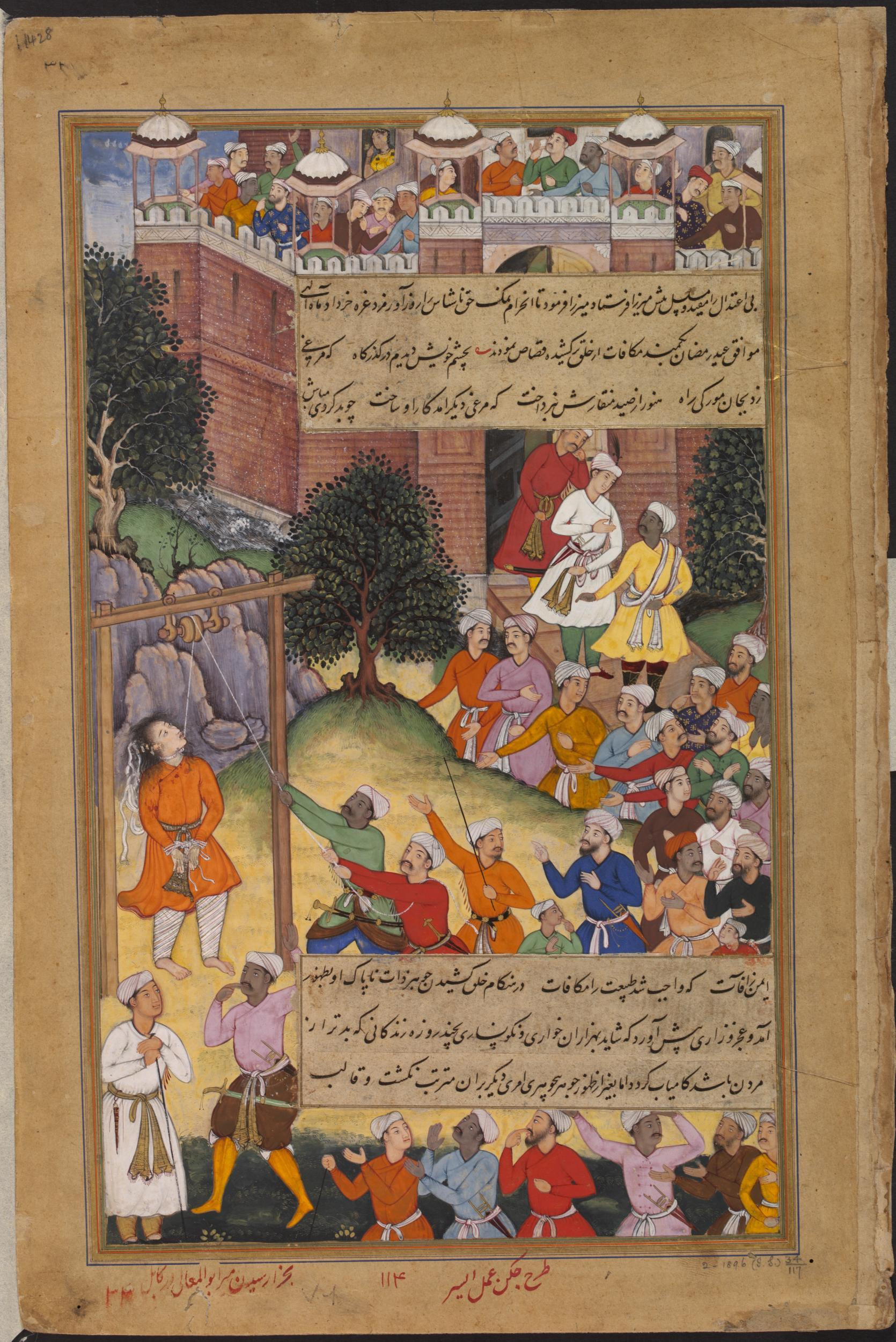
The Execution of Shah Abu'l Ma'ali at Kabul in 1564, by Asir and Jagan, from the Victoria and Albert Akbarnama, folio 114. Watercolour. Pakistan and India, 1590–95.

Shah Abu’l Maʿālī, also Abu’l Maʿālī Shah (died 1564) was a Persian émigré intellectual, Sufi-leaning courtier, and poet who became briefly prominent at the early Mughal court, especially during the reign of Humayun. He was from Kashgar in Central Asia. He is remembered today largely because of a series of depictions, including a portrait attributed to Mir Sayyid Ali (c. 1545), which is one of the earliest naturalistic Mughal portraits.

Shah Abu’l Maʿālī was part of the wave of Safavid-trained literati and artists who entered Mughal service after Humayun's exile to Persia and return to India. He was a man of letters, poet, and an intellectual, associated with Sufi and heterodox religious ideas.

He appears to have enjoyed temporary favor under Humayun. Contemporary sources portray Abu’l Maʿālī as eccentric, outspoken, and intellectually provocative, which likely contributed both to his prominence and his downfall. As he had been a close confidant of Humayun, he assumed that he now also had a special position at court. According to Abu 'l-Fazl, this misjudgment caused him to behave so inappropriately.

Humayun died unexpectedly in a fall in 1556. His son Jalāl ud-Dīn Muhammad, commonly known by his epithet "Akbar", was crowned on February 14, 1556. However, Bairam Khan, who was instrumental in the reconquest of India, remained in office for the next few years. Akbar and his circle were deeply resentful of the arrogance of Humayun's protégé. He was said to have "seditious thoughts", and Abu'l Fazl, the chronicler of Akbar's reign, wrote of Abu'l Ma'ali was now a drunken madman whose "brain had been ruined by the worship of his own beauty". Three days after the coronation celebrations, Akbar held a large assembly to which Shah Abu 'l-Maʿali was also invited. He was arrested and taken to a prison in Lahore. He was able to escape from there.

After his escape, Shah Abu'l Ma'ali was involved in murder and insurrection in Kashmir and Rajasthan during a period of eight years. Shah Abu'l Ma'ali, sought refuge in Kabul with Akbar's ten-year-old half-brother Mirza Muhammad Hakim and his influential mother Mah Chuchak Begam. His high lineage prompted Mah Chuchak to marry him off to her daughter Bakht-un-Nissa Begum. However, in his quest for unrestricted rule, Abu'l Maʿali murdered the Begam and some of her advisors just a few months later and attempted to take control of her son Mirza Muhammad Hakim. Mirza Muhammad Hakim appealed for help to his cousin Mirza Sulayman, formerly appointed by Humayun as governor of Badakhshan, who intervened in Kabul. Mirza Sulayman finally caught Shah Abu'l Ma'ali near Kabul, and remitted him to Mirza Muhammad Hakim, who had him strangled, or hanged, in 1564.

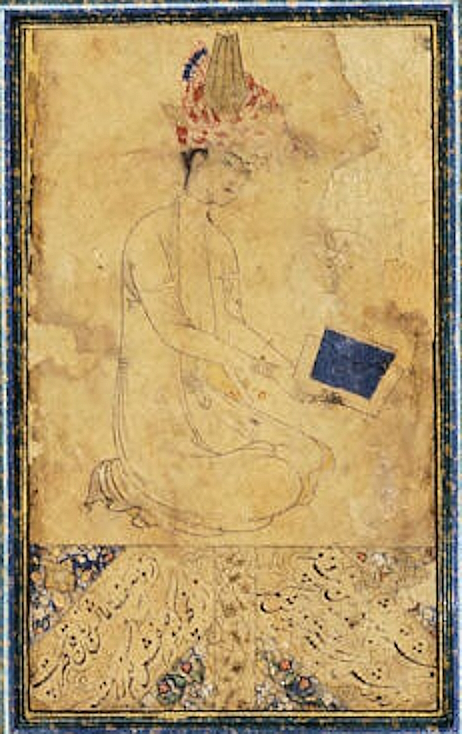
Portrait of Shah Abu’l Ma’ali. Attributed to Mir Sayyid Ali, c.1545, Mughal court. Harvard Museum, 2009.202.205

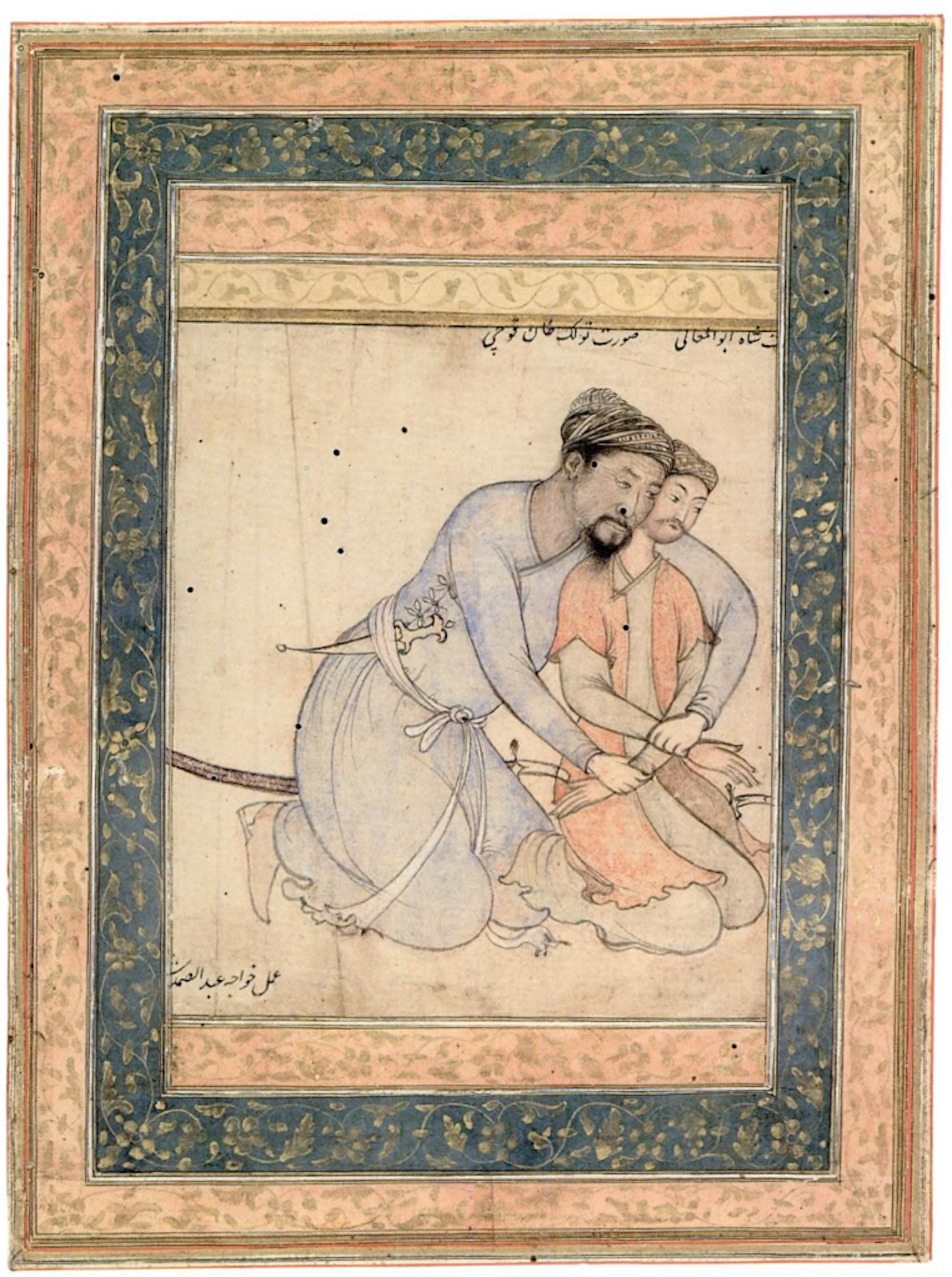
The arrest of Shah Abu'l Ma'ali. Painted by 'Abd us-Samad, Mughal, 1556–1560, Bodleian Library, Ms Ouseley, Add. 172, fol.17a

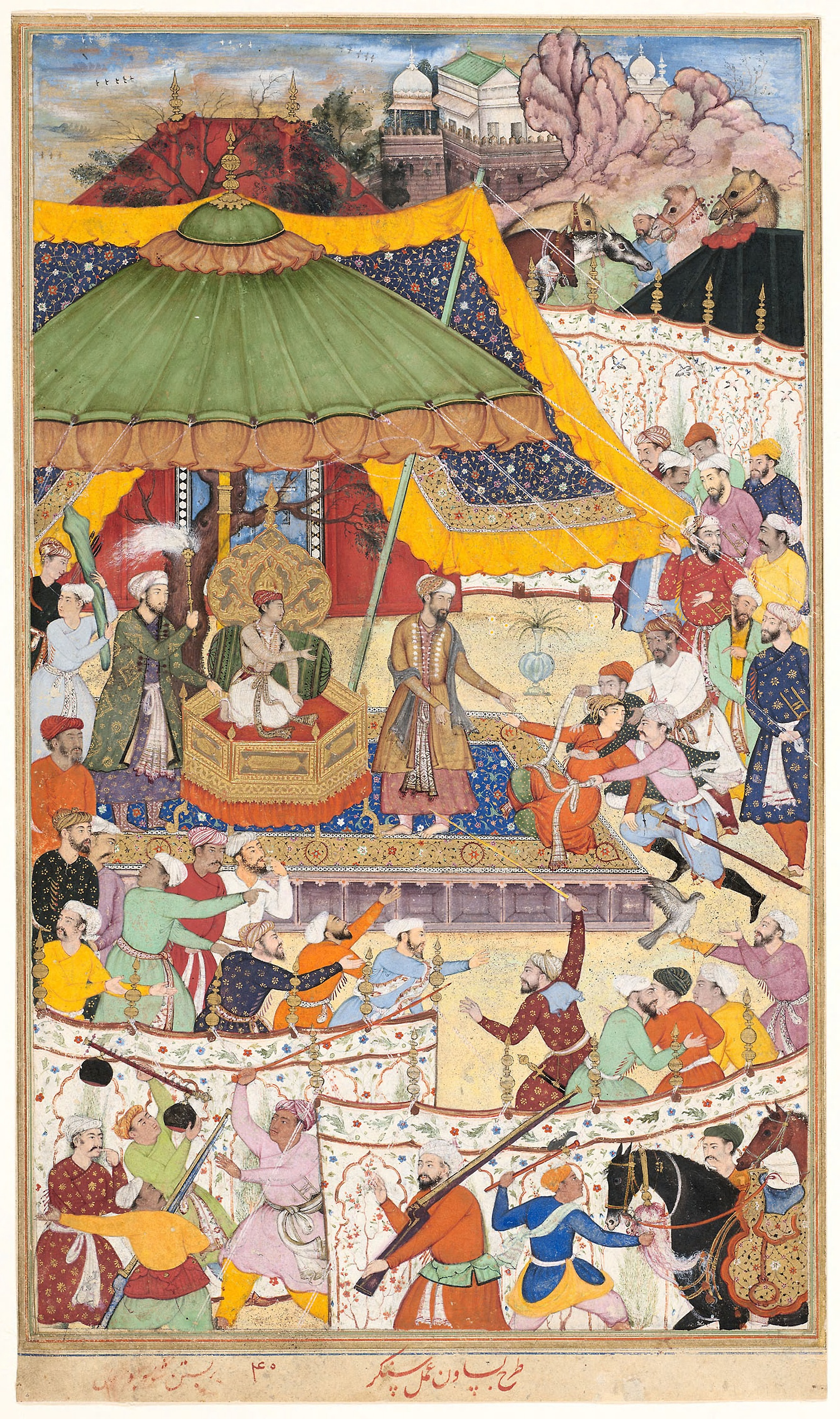
The Young Emperor Akbar Arrests the Insolent Shah Abu’l-Maali. Victoria and Albert Akbarnama, folio 40

== Sources ==
- Branfoot, Crispin (30 June 2018). Portraiture in South Asia since the Mughals: Art, Representation and History. Bloomsbury Publishing. ISBN 978-1-83860-897-2.
- Crill, Rosemary; Jariwala, Kapil (2010). The Indian Portrait, 1560-1860. Mapin Publishing Pvt Ltd. ISBN 978-81-89995-37-9.
- Sharma, Manimugdha (18 October 2019). Allahu Akbar: Understanding the Great Mughal in Today's India. Bloomsbury Publishing. p. 141. ISBN 978-93-86950-54-3.
