= Suleiman Mirza (Timurid) =

Cousin of the Mughal Empire's founder Babur

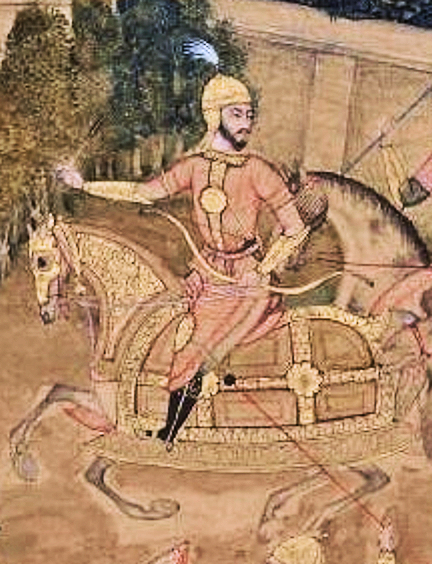
Mirza Sulayman, besieging Kabul in 1556-1557

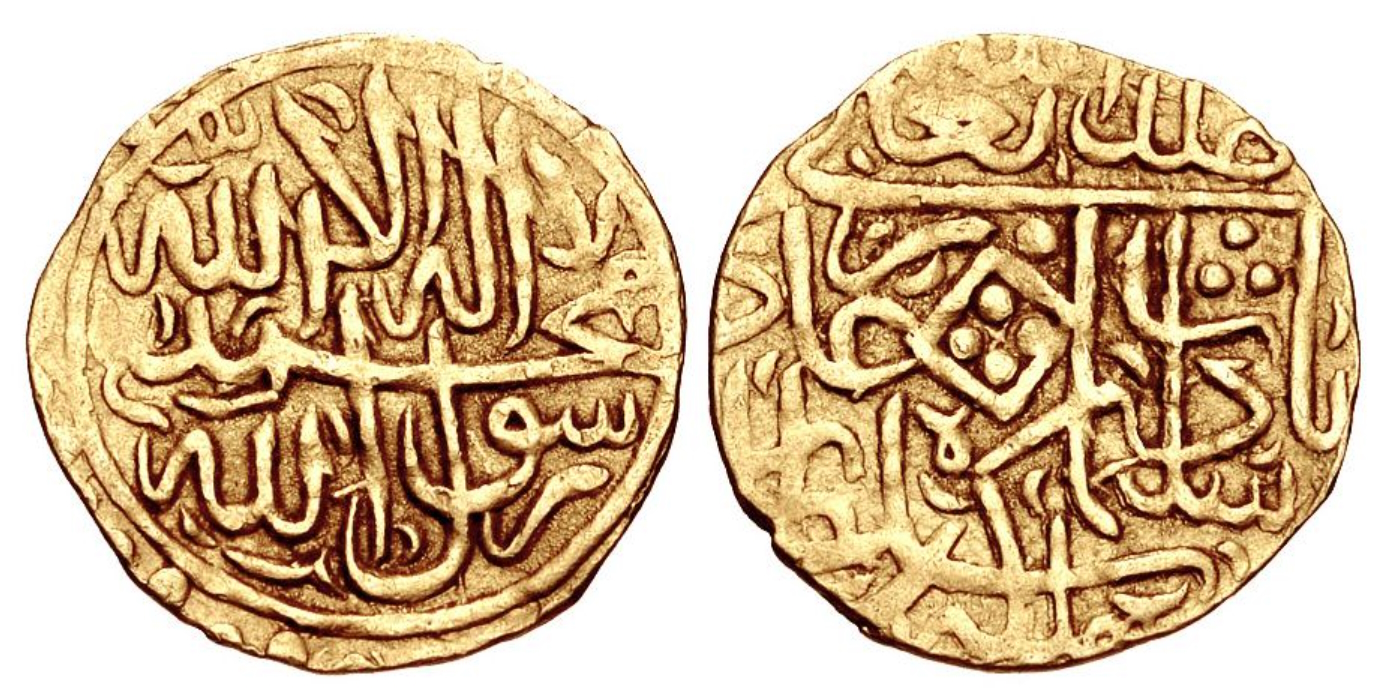
Coinage of Sulayman Mirza. Quarter Ashrafi. Unnamed (Badakhshan) mint

Mīrzā Sulaimān (1514–1589) was a member of the late Timurid dynasty, and ruler of Badakhshan from 1529 to 1584. He was a son of Sultan Uways Khan Mirza, ruler of Badakhshan, and a descendant of Abu Sa'id Mirza's second son Sultan Mahmud Mirza, and therefore a cousin of Bābur and a seventh-generation descendant of Tīmūr. Khān Mīrzā ("Sulṭān Uways Mīrzā") was son of Sultan Mahmud Mirza and Sultan Nigar Khanum (daughter of Yunus Khan).

After the death of his father Sultan Uways Khan Mirza in 1520, Bābur took direct control of his dominion of Badakhshan, later entrusting it to his son Humayun. However, when Humayun left his post without permission in June 1529, Bābur placed in his position the young Mīrzā Sulaimān, who was now fifteen years old.

Throughout his life, Mīrzā Sulaimān then fought repeatedly to liberate himself from the control of Humāyūn, and later his son Akbar. In particular, he tried to obtain the control of Kabul. In 1546, the Mughal armies of Humayun fought victoriously against Mīrzā Sulaimān. He is again recorded besieging Kabul in 1556–1557, and in 1564–1565, when he expelled the Mughal half-brother of Akbar, Mirza Muhammad Hakim.

In 1584, Suleiman Mirza was expelled by the Uzbek troops of Abdullah Khan II, and had to flee to Kabul under the protection of Mirza Muhammad Hakim. He attempted to recover his lost dominions, in vain. Mirza Muhammad Hakim then died, and some Kabul nobles, led by Faridun Khan, conspired to invite the army of Abdullah Khan to Kabul and offer allegiance. This motivated Akbar to preemptively take control of Kabul and its region.

Mīrzā Sulaimān appears extensively in the Akbarnama. He is recorded as traveling from Kabul in 1586, to visit the Mughal emperor Akbar in Lahore. He was the grandfather of Shah Rukh Mirza.

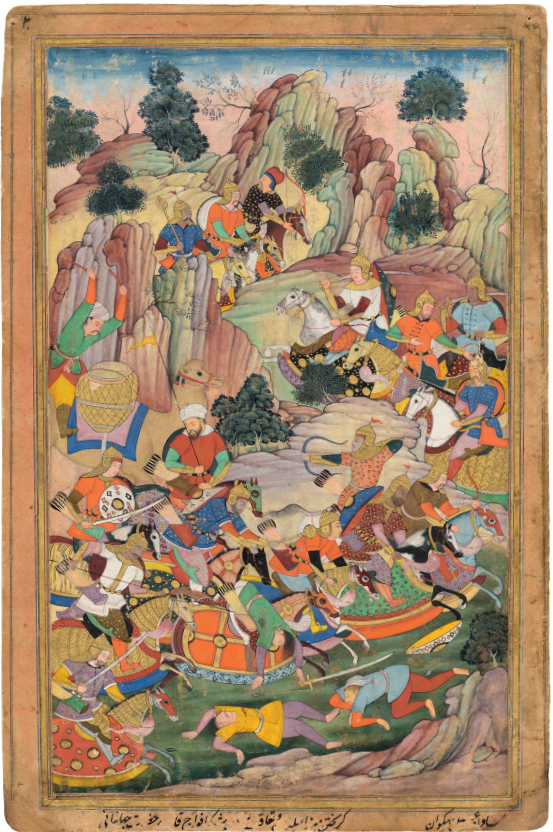
Defeat and escape of Mirza Sulayman in 1546

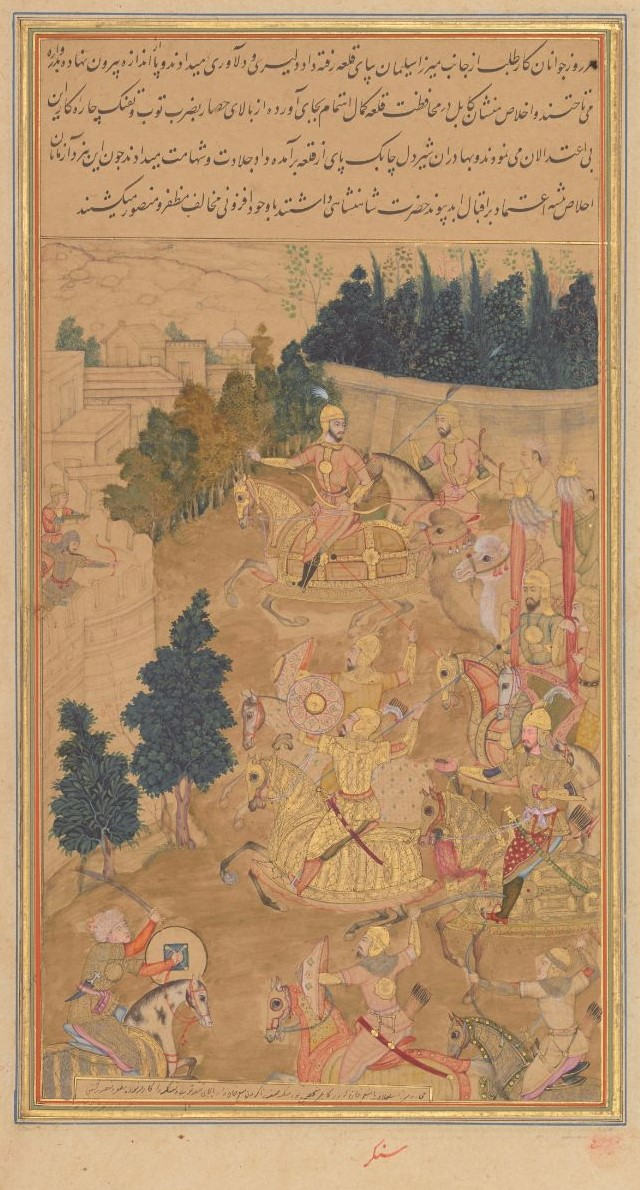
Mirza Sulayman besieges Kabul in 1556–1557

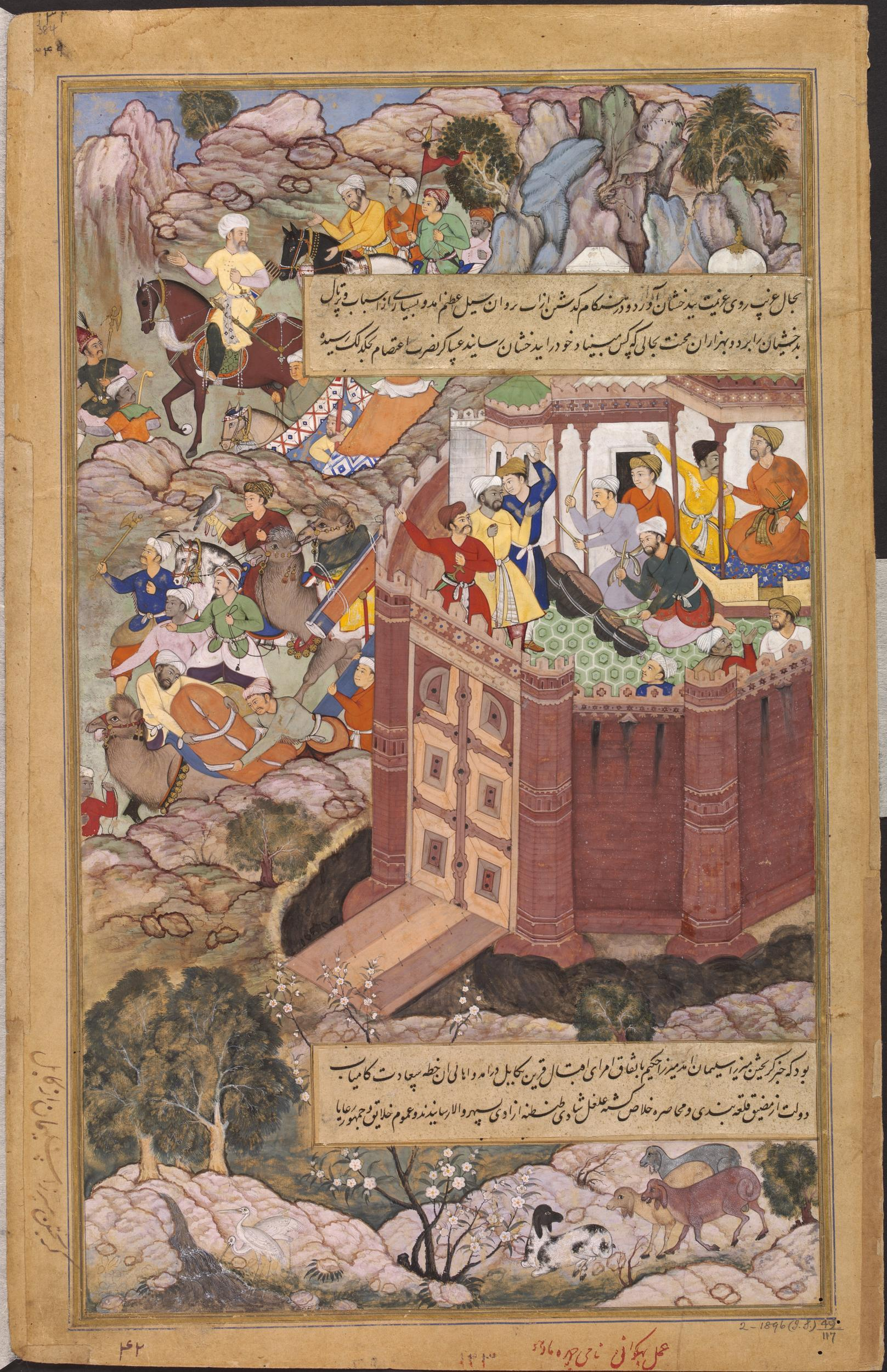
Mirza Sulayman, ending the siege of Kabul in 1564–1565, and fleeing to Badakhshan

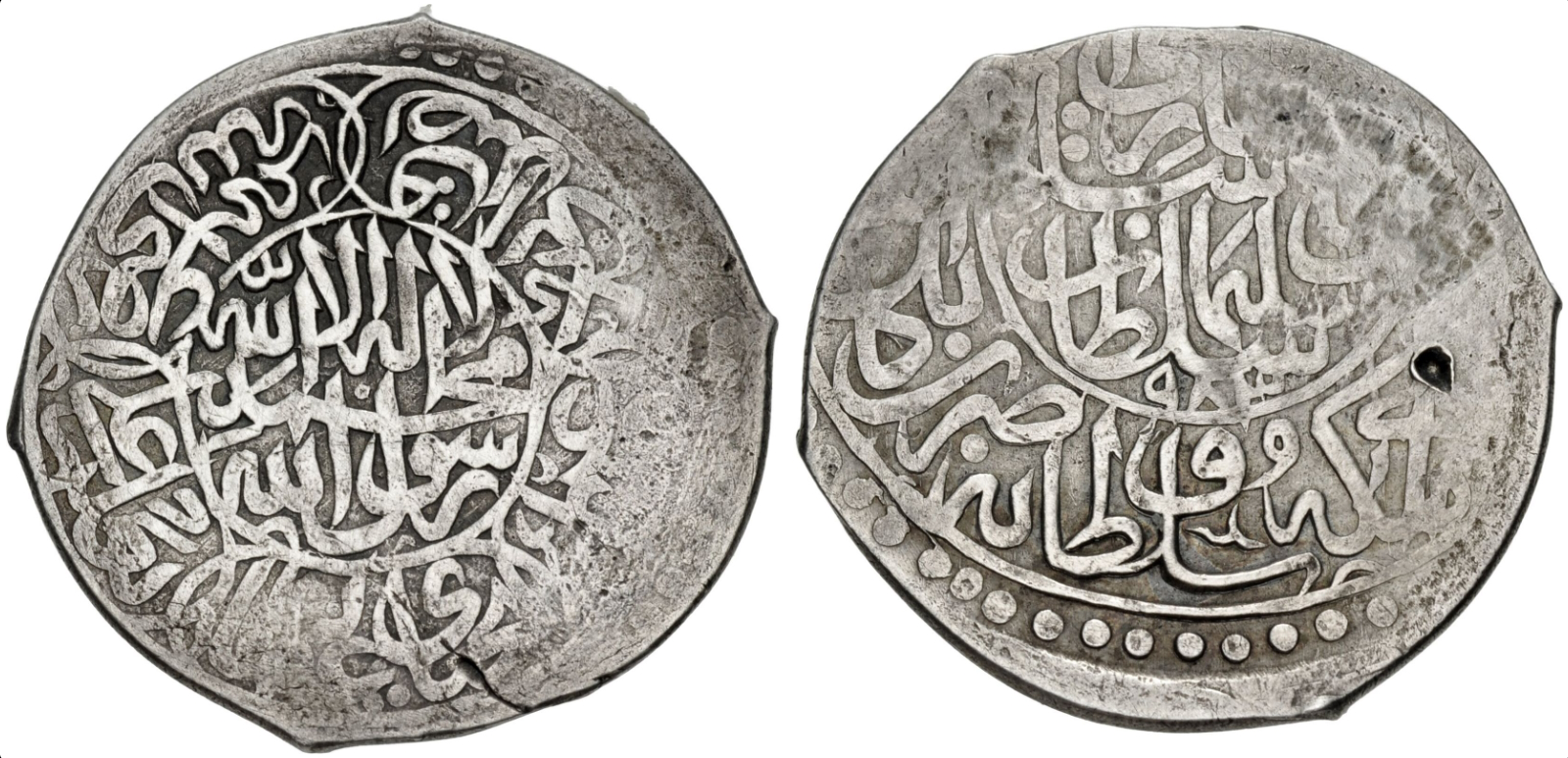
Coinage of Sulayman Mirza. Kabul mint. Dated AH 983 (1575-6)
