= Akbarnama =

16th-century book by Mughal historian Abu'l-Fazl

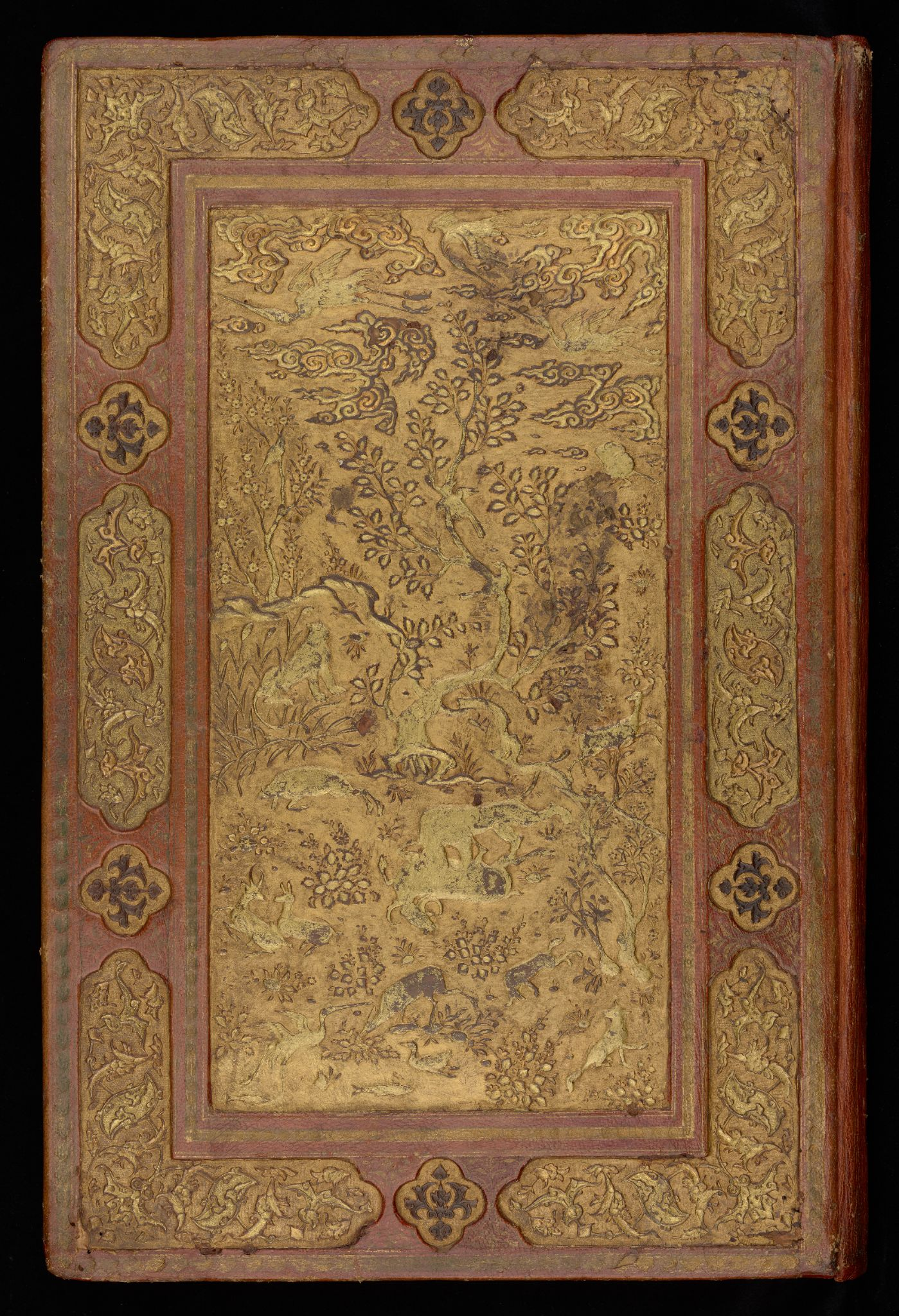
- Binding from "Akbarnama", c. 1600 – 1605 at the Chester Beatty Library.
- Author: Abul Fazl and Faizi Sirhindi
- Language: Persian
- Genre: Biography
- Set in: 16–17th century Mughal India
- Publication date: 1600–1605
- Publication place: Mughal Empire (India)

The Akbarnama (Persian: اکبرنامه, romanized: Akbarnāma, lit. 'Book of Akbar') is an official chronicle of the reign of Akbar, the third Mughal Emperor (r. 1556–1605), commissioned by Akbar himself and written largely by his court historian and biographer, Abul Fazl. It was written in Persian, which was the literary language of the Mughals, and includes vivid and detailed descriptions of his life and times. It followed the Baburnama (the more personal memoir by his grandfather, Babur, founder of the dynasty) and numerous other histories sponsored by Akbar. Many manuscripts of the text are lavishly illustrated.

Abul Fazl, who was one of the Nine Jewels (Hindustani: Navaratnas) of Akbar's royal court, states in the book that it took seven years to be completed. The original manuscript contained many miniature paintings supporting the texts, thought to have been illustrated between c. 1592 and 1594 by at least forty-nine different artists from Akbar's imperial workshop, representing the best of the Mughal school of painting, and masters of the imperial workshop, including Basawan, whose use of portraiture in its illustrations was an innovation in Indian art.

After Akbar's death in 1605, the manuscript remained in the library of his son, Jahangir (r. 1605–1627) and later Shah Jahan (r. 1628–1658). Today, the Victoria and Albert Akbarnama, with 116 miniature paintings, is at the Victoria and Albert Museum. It was bought by the South Kensington Museum (now the V&A) in 1896 from Mrs Frances Clarke, acquired by her husband upon his retirement from serving as Commissioner of Oudh (1858–1862). Soon after, the paintings and illuminated frontispiece were removed from the volume to be mounted and framed for display.

== Volumes I and II ==
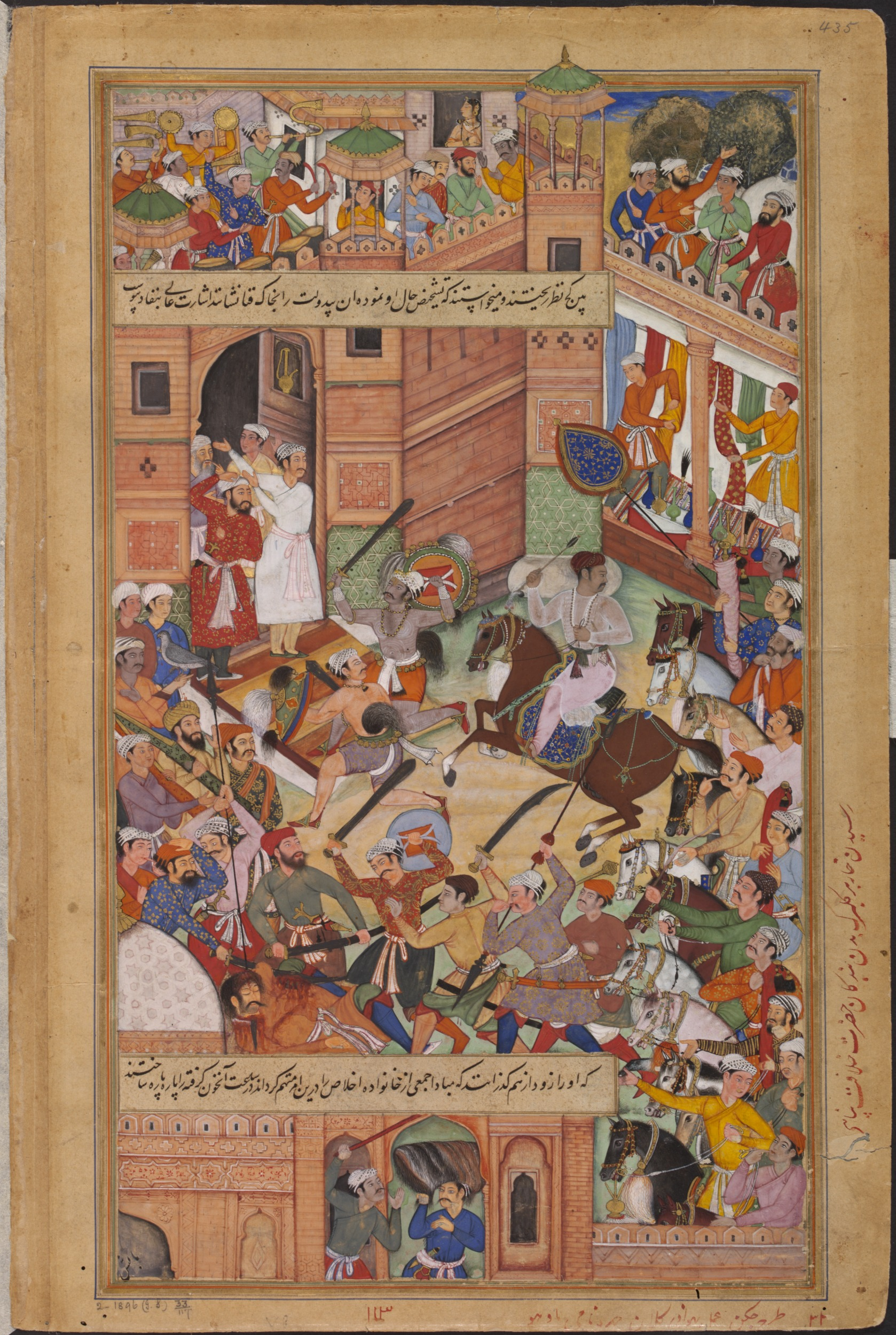
An Attempt on Akbar's life in Delhi in 1564

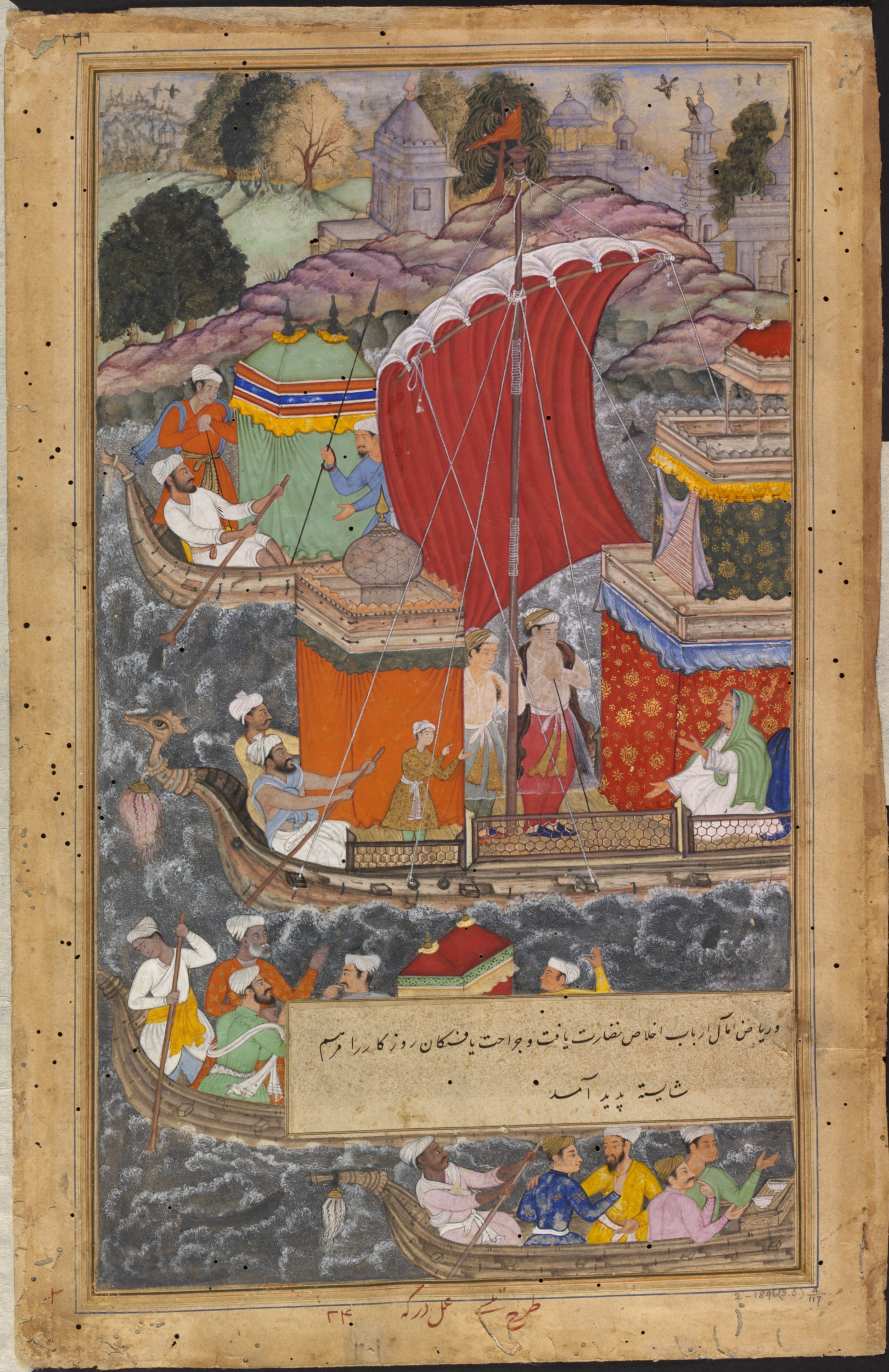
Akbar's mother travels by boat to Agra, Victoria and Albert Museum

The first volume of Akbarnama deals with the birth of Akbar, the history of Timur's family and the reigns of Babur and Humayun and the Suri sultans of Delhi. Volume one of Akbarnama encompasses Akbar's birth and his upbringings. According to Abul Fazl Humayun, the second Mughal emperor and Akbar's father is praying to the Ka'ba, an Islamic holy place, for a successor to the Mughal empire. After this prayer, Maryam Makani showcases different signs that she is pregnant with Akbar such as having a shining forehead that others believe to be a mirror on her face or the warmth and joy that enters her bosom when a light shines on her. Miryam believes the light to be God's Light blessing her and her unborn child. Nine months later while Humayun is away, Maryam gives birth to Akbar under what is considered an auspicious star and there is great celebration.

The second volume describes the detailed history of the reign of Akbar till 1602 and records the events during Akbar's reign. It also deals with how Bairam Khan and Akbar won the battle of Panipat against Hemu, an Indian warrior.

== Volume III: The Ain-i-Akbari ==
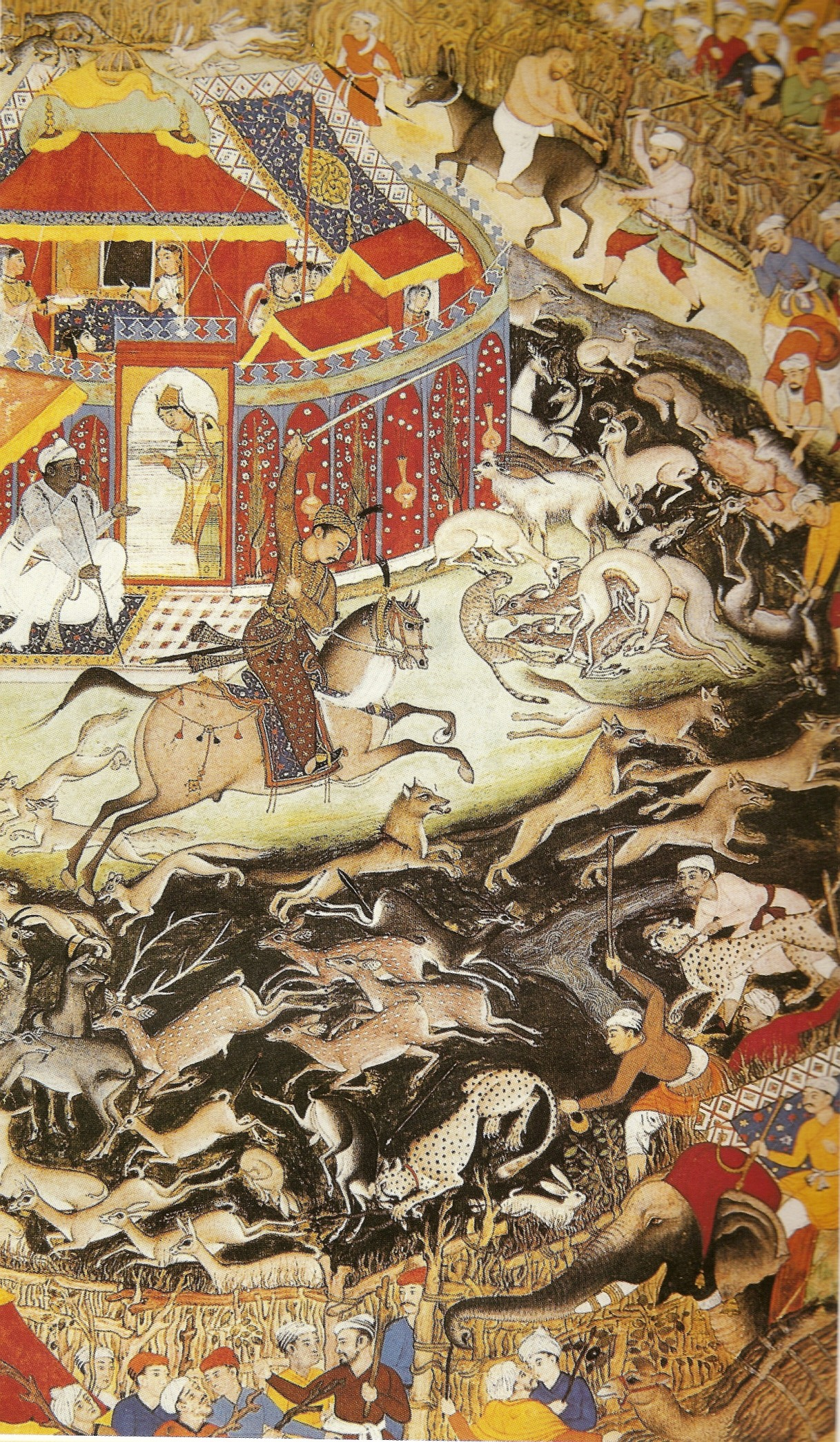
Akbar on a hunt

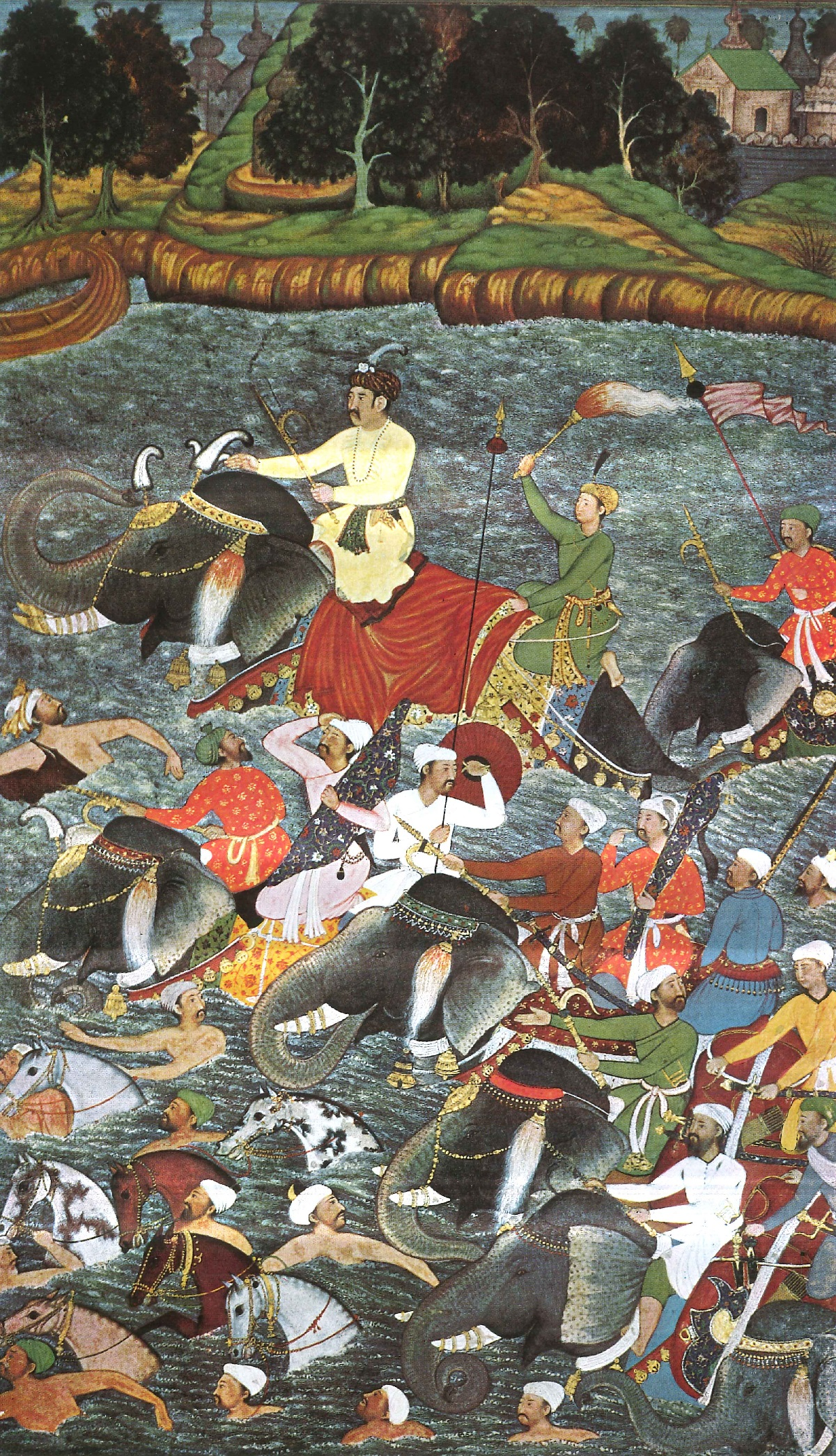
Mughal Emperor Akbar crossing the river at night.

The third volume, called the Ā’īn-i-Akbarī, describes the administrative system of the Empire as well as containing the famous "Account of the Hindu Sciences". It also deals with Akbar's household, army, the revenues and the geography of the empire. It also produces rich details about the traditions and culture of the people living in India. It is famous for its rich statistical details about things as diverse as crop yields, prices, wages and revenues. Here Abu'l Fazl's ambition, in his own words, is: "It has long been the ambitious desire of my heart to pass in review to some extent, the general conditions of this vast country, and to record the opinions professed by the majority of the learned among the Hindus. I know not whether the love of my native land has been the attracting influence or exactness of historical research and genuine truthfulness of narrative..." (Āin-i-Akbarī, translated by Heinrich Blochmann and Colonel Henry Sullivan Jarrett, Volume III, pp 7). In this section, he expounds the major beliefs of the six major Hindu philosophical schools of thought, and those of the Jains, Buddhists, and Nāstikas. He also gives several Indian accounts of geography, cosmography, and some tidbits on Indian aesthetic thought. Most of this information is derived from Sanskrit texts and knowledge systems. Abu'l Fazl admits that he did not know Sanskrit and it is thought that he accessed this information through intermediaries, likely Jains who were favoured at Akbar's court.

In his description of Hinduism, Abu’l Fazl tries to relate everything back to something that the Muslims could understand. Many of the orthodox Muslims thought that the Hindus were guilty of two of the greatest sins, polytheism and idolatry.

On the topic of idolatry, Abu’l Fazl says that the symbols and images that the Hindus carry are not idols but merely are there to keep their minds from wandering. He writes that only serving and worshipping God is required.

Abul Fazl also describes the Caste system to his readers. He writes the name, rank, and duties of each caste. He then goes on to describe the sixteen subclasses which come from intermarriage among the main four.

Abu’l Fazl next writes about Karma about which he writes, "This is a system of knowledge of an amazing and extraordinary character, in which the learned of Hindustan concur without dissenting opinion." He places the actions and what event they bring about in the next life into four different kinds. First, he writes many of the different ways in which a person from one class can be born into a different class in the next life and some of the ways in which a change in gender can be brought about. He classifies the second kind as the different diseases and sicknesses one suffers from. The third kind is actions which cause a woman to be barren or the death of a child. And the fourth kind deals with money and generosity, or lack thereof.

The Ain-i-Akbari is currently housed in the Hazarduari Palace, in West Bengal.

== The Akbarnama of Faizi Sirhindi ==
The Akbarnama of Shaikh Illahdad Faiz Sirhindi is another contemporary biography of the Mughal emperor Akbar. This work is mostly not original and basically a compilation from the Tabaqat-i-Akbari of Khwaja Nizam-ud-Din Ahmad and the more famous Akbarnama of Abul Fazl. The only original elements in this work are a few verses and some interesting stories. Very little is known about the writer of this Akbarnama. His father Mulla Ali Sher Sirhindi was a scholar and Khwaja Nizam-ud-Din Ahmad, the writer of the Tabaqat-i-Akbari was his student. He lived in Sirhind sarkar of Delhi Subah and held a madad-i-ma´ash (a land granted by the state for maintenance) village there. He accompanied his employer and patron Shaikh Farid Bokhari (who held the post of the Bakhshi-ul-Mulk) on his various services. His most important work is a dictionary, the Madar-ul-Afazil, completed in 1592. He started writing this Akbarnama at the age of 36 years. His work also ends in 1602 like the one of Abu´l Fazl. This work provides us with some additional information regarding the services rendered by Shaikh Farid Bokhari. It also provides valuable information regarding the siege and capture of Asirgarh.

== Translations ==
- Beveridge Henry. (tr.) (1902–39, Reprint 2010). The Akbarnama of Abu-L-Fazl in three volumes.
- The History of Akbar, Volumes 1–8 (the Akbarnama), edited and translated by Wheeler M. Thackston, Murty Classical Library of India, Harvard University Press (2015–2022)
  - This is both an English translation and a Persian edition.
