= Mughal conquest of Odisha =

1590–1593 Mughal military campaign in Odisha

Mughal conquest of Orissa
- Part of Mughal conquest of Bengal
Date	1590–1593
Location	Orissa
Result	Mughal victory
Territorial changes	Orissa annexed to the Mughal Empire

Belligerents
Mughal Empire: Kingdom of Amber; Bengal Subah	Afghans of Orissa

Commanders and leaders
Man Singh I Jagat Singh (WIA); Durjan Singh; Bika Bathor †; Mahesh Das †; Nam Charan †; Vir Hambir; S'iad Khan; Babui Mankali; Yusuf	Qutulu Khan # Bahadur Kuruh; Nasir Khan (surrendered); Khwaja Wais †; Sultan Sur (POW)

Casualties and losses
	300 killed

The Mughal conquest of Odisha (1590–1593) was a campaign in the region of Odisha by the Mughal Empire under Akbar, led by Raja Man Singh. In 1590, Man Singh, the governor of Bihar, invaded Odisha to attack the Afghan chief Qutlu Khan Lohani, who had declared himself the ruler of the region. However, Qutlu Khan died before he could fight Man Singh. His son, Nasir Khan, initially resisted but then surrendered and was allowed to remain as governor. Two years later, Nisar Khan broke the agreement, took control of the crown lands in Puri (including the Jagannath Temple), and rebelled. Man Singh defeated Nisar Khan, expelled him, and made Orissa part of the Bengal Subah.

== Background ==
Sulaiman Khan Karrani, the Afghan ruler of the Karrani dynasty of Bengal acknowledged Akbar's suzerainty in 1565 AD. In 1568, he conquered Orissa. After his death in 1572, Bayazid Khan Karrani ascended the throne and lastly Daud Khan Karrani. They both shook off Mughal authority and acted independent. Akbar ordered a campaign against Daud who was defeated on many occasions and fled to Orissa. He at last was killed in battle. The Afghans carried out revolts and resistance against the Mughals. In 1582, Qutlu Khan Lohani, an officer of Daud rebelled, defeated Ramchandra Deva of Khurda, occupied Puri and annexed parts of Bengal. On 11 Jule 1584, Qutlu Khan Lohani left for Orissa to rule as a tributary chief of the Mughals. He occupied some parts of Mughal territories. Akbar ordered Man Singh to march to Orissa to annex the region.

== Conquest ==
=== First campaign (1590) ===
In April 1590, Raja Man Singh, the Mughal governor of Bihar, launched an expedition to conquer Orissa. Reinforced with Bengal artillery, he marched through Bhagalpur and Burdwan, encamped at Jahanabad in Hooghly. Qutlu Khan Lohani, assembled a large force under Bahadur Kuruh to the fort of Raipur near the imperial camp. On 21 May, the Mughal division commanded by Jagat Singh was attacked and overwhelmed by Afghan force. The Mughal troops, unprepared and disordered, offered brief resistance before routing. Several Rajput officers, including Bika Bathor, Mahesh Das, and Nam Charan, fought valiantly and were killed. Jagat Singh, who had been wounded, escaped capture when Raja Vir Hambir escorted him to the safety of his fortress at Bishnupur in Bankura district. A few days later Qutlu Khan died and his son Nasir Khan was placed by his wazir Khwajah 'Isa who made peace with Mughals. A treaty was signed on 15 August 1590 AD. The terms read as follows:

1. Khutbah should be read in the name of Akbar and coins in Orissa.
2. The government of Orissa to be confirmed to Nasir.
3. The temple of Puri, Jagannath and surrounding districts to be ceded to Mughals.

=== Final conquest (1591–1593) ===
For the next two years, Nasir Khan remained loyal to the Mughal Empire, but he soon violated the treaty by laying siege to the Jagannath Temple in Puri. Raja Vir Hambir Singh was attacked too. Man Singh was again called to march against Orissa. On 3 November 1591, he left Bihar in two divisions by land and water to Bengal where Bengal's viceroy S'iad Khan sent troops to join him. Within a day, entire region up to Jaleswar was conquered. The Afghans checked the Mughals at the bank of Subarnarekha River on 10 April 1592. Man Singh with his son Jagat and Durjan took part in the battle. Initial coordination between the Bengal contingent and Man Singh's forces was poor, and Afghan charges nearly routed the Mughal army. Receiving reinforcements, Mughal artillery and archery inflicted severe losses on the Afghans and their war elephants, causing the enemy to break and flee. The Afghans left around 300 dead on the field, including the divisional commander Khwaja Wais, while another commander, Sultan Sur, was captured.

Man Singh then marched to Bhadrak. There he learnt about Afghan forces at the fort of Sarang-garh in Cuttack district. The Afghans evacuated Cuttack on his approach and took refuge with Raja Ram Chand of Seraen. Man Singh dispatched a force under Yusuf of Kashmir to besiege the fortress. On 8 June the garrison capitulated. Cuttack was taken without any resistance. Additionally, the Tila Raja joined Man Singh near Kalkalghati surrendering the fort of Aul. Man Singh continued to raid throughout the Khurda territories. At last Raja Ramchandra Deva of Khurda submitted to him. Meanwhile, scattered Afghan forces seized the town of Jaleswar from Babui Mankali. A Mughal detachment from Cuttack soon recaptured the position. On 30 May the fort of Sarang-garh was surrendered to Man Singh. On 31 January 1593, the Khurda Raja wedded one of his daughters to Man Singh in marriage. Later Man Singh took the fort of Bhanpur, between Orissa and Telingana and give it to Ramchandra Dev. He returned back to Bihar following the campaign.

== Aftermath ==
Man Singh transferred the nephews of Qutlu Khan, Sulaiman and Usman to Faridpur in east Bengal. They killed Chand Ray the son of Kedar Ray who tried to seize them and joined Isa Khan's service. In February 1594, Man Singh presented the three sons of Qutlu Khan at the Mughal court.

== Bibliography ==
- Sarkar, Jadunath, ed. (1943). The History of Bengal. Vol. II: Muslim Period. Delhi: B.R. Publishing Corporation. ISBN 81-7646-239-X.
- Srivastava, Ashirbadi Lal (1986). The Mughal Empire (1526–1803 A.D.). Agra: Shiva Lal Agarwala & Company.
- Prasad, Ishwari (1974). The Mughal Empire. Chugh Publications.
- Yamin, Mohammed. Impact of Islam on Orissan Culture. Readworthy. ISBN 978-93-5018-102-7.
- Burn, Richard, ed. (1937). The Cambridge History of India. Cambridge University Press.
- Sarkar, Jadunath (1984). A History of Jaipur: C. 1503-1938. Orient Blackswan. ISBN 978-81-250-0333-5.
