= Gar Mandaran =

- Village
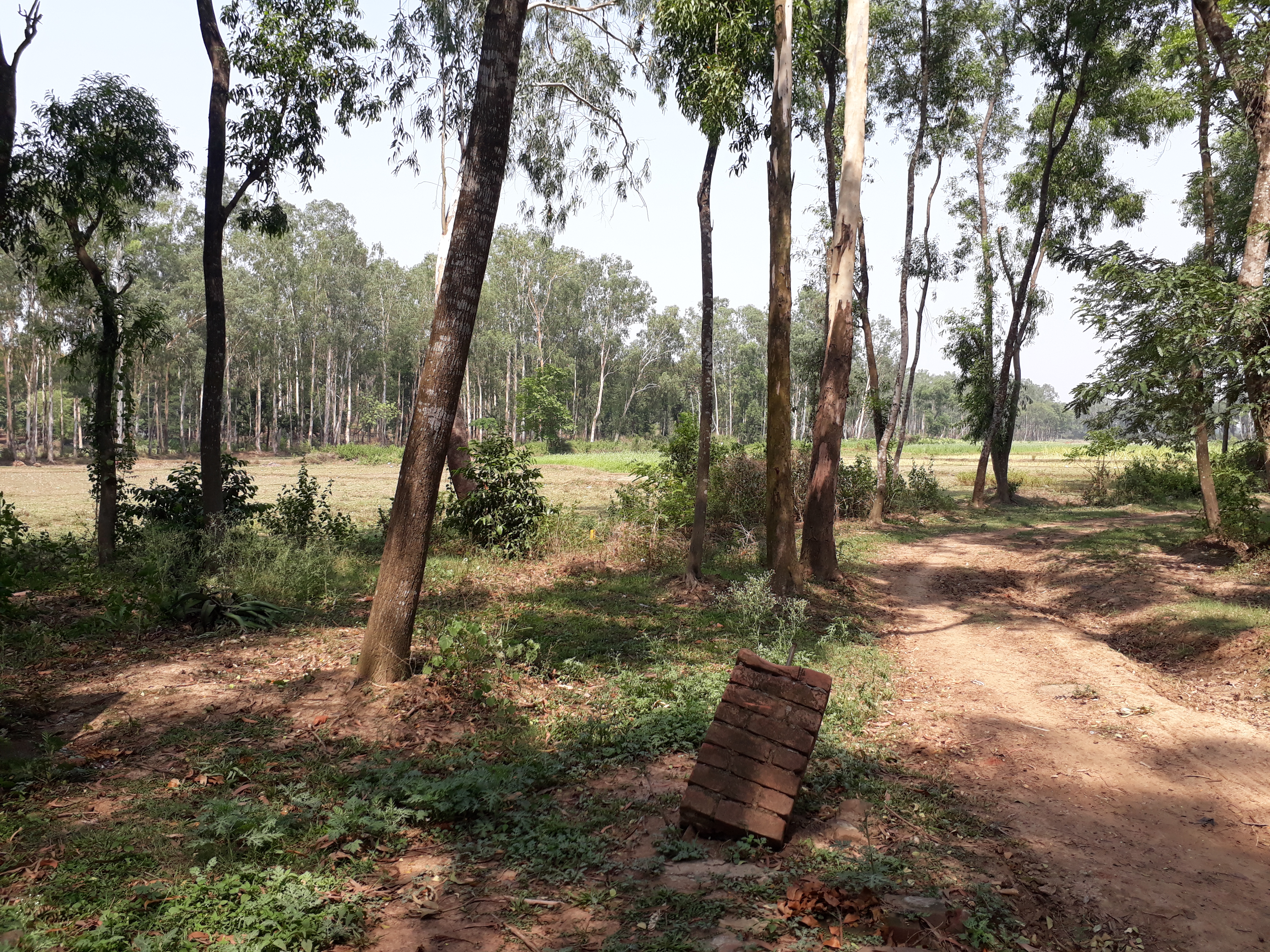
- Historic Gar Mandaran mound

- Location in West Bengal, India Gar Mandaran (India)
- Coordinates: 22.874799°N 87.665972°E
- Country: India
- State: West Bengal
- District: Hooghly
- Elevation: 42 m (138 ft)

Population (2011)
  - Total: 6,264

Languages
  - Official: Bengali, English
- Time zone: UTC+5:30 (IST)
- PIN: 712612 (Mandaran)
- Telephone/STD code: 03221
- Lok Sabha constituency: Arambagh
- Vidhan Sabha constituency: Goghat
- Website: hooghly.gov.in

Gar Mandaran is a village and a gram panchayat in the Goghat II CD block in the Arambag subdivision of the Hooghly district in the state of West Bengal, India.

== Overview ==
The ruins of a fort at Gar Mandaran provided the setting for Bankim Chandra Chatterjee's 1865 novel Durgeshnandini.

Durgeshnandini is a romantic novel, based partly on history and partly on hearsay. The story centres around the attack and occupation of Gar Mandaran stronghold of Raja Birendra Singh, linked to the Bishnupur Raj, by the Pathans who were then entrenched in Odisha. The Mughal general Man Singh's son, Jagat Singh, was despatched to keep the Pathans at bay. Jagat Singh fell in love with Tilottama, the beautiful daughter of Raja Birendra Singh. The Pathans captured the fort, killed Raja Birendra Singh and held Jagat Singh and Tilottama, but a fatal attack on the Pathan general Kotlu Khan, turned things around.

Durgeshnandini, published in 1865, took the literary world by storm and was considered an epoch-making novel. It went through 13 editions during Bankim Chandra's life-time.

== Geography ==
Cities and towns in Arambagh subdivision in Hooghly district
M: municipal city/ town, R: rural/ urban centre, H: historical/ religious centre
Owing to space constraints in the small map, the actual locations in a larger map may vary slightly

=== Area overview ===
The Arambagh subdivision, presented in the map alongside, is divided into two physiographic parts – the Dwarakeswar River being the dividing line. The western part is upland and rocky – it is extension of the terrain of neighbouring Bankura district. The eastern part is flat alluvial plain area. The railways, the roads and flood-control measures have had an impact on the area. The area is overwhelmingly rural with 94.77% of the population living in rural areas and 5.23% of the population living in urban areas.

Note: The map alongside presents some of the notable locations in the subdivision. All places marked in the map are linked in the larger full screen map.

=== Location ===
Gar Manadaran is located at 22.874799°N 87.665972°E.

== History ==
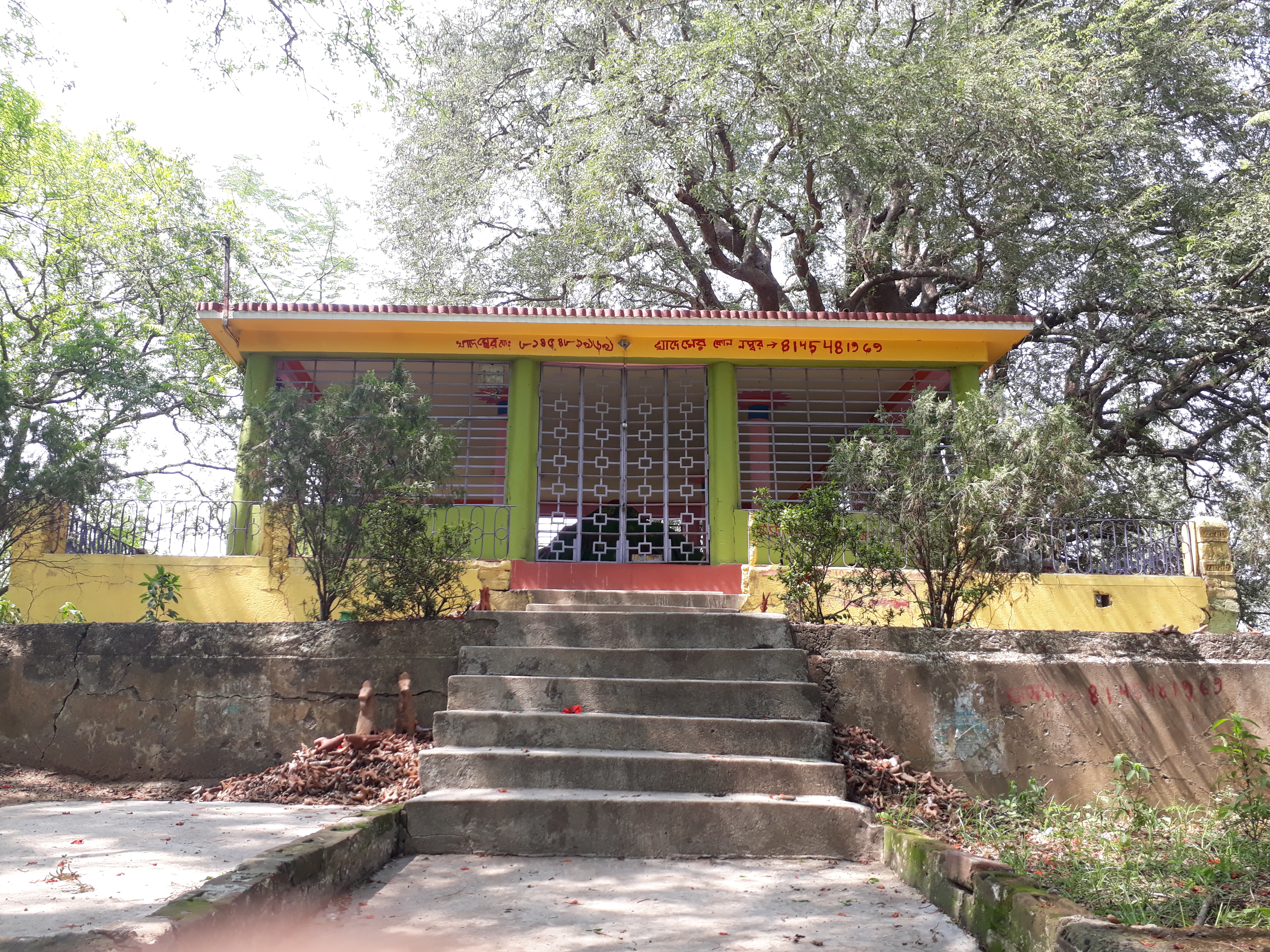
Tomb of Syed Ismail Gazi at Garh Mandaran

The area housed a fortress (Garh in Bengali) in medieval times, that was under the control of Bengali Hindu chieftains bearing the surname Sura who exercised considerable influence on the Rarh region. The Thirumurai inscription of Rajendra Chola, describing his Bengal campaigns lists one Ranasura as the ruler of the region. A few decades later, the Ramacharita mentions a Lakshmisura of Aparamandara in the list of vassals of Ramapala. Popular tradition in Bengal has it that Vijaya Sena had entered into a matrimonial alliance with the Sura chieftains. The Ganga king of Utkala, Narasimhadeva I captured the fort from the Bengal Sultanate following his victory in the Battle of Umurdan in 1256. . The fort remained under the control of Utkala kings till the reign of Gajapati ruler Kapilendradeva but his son Prataparudradeva lost it to Bengali Sultan Alauddin Hussain Shah. Mukundadeva had briefly regained control of the fort but he was chased out by a large invasion force led by Kalapahad. When the frontiers of Bengal were expanded during Mughal rule, there were three prominent administrative zones in the Saptagram area – Sirkar Satgaon, Sirkar Selimabad and Sirkar Mandaran. The tomb of warrior Shah Ismail Ghazi is situated in the mound of Gar Mandaran.

== Demographics ==
According to the 2011 Census of India, Gar Mandaran had a total population of 6,264 of which 3,242 (52%) were males and 3,022 (48%) were females. Population in the age range 0–6 years was 734. The total number of literate persons in Gar Mandaran was 4,100 (74.14% of the population over 6 years).

== Transport ==
Gar Mandaran is on Kamarpukur-Gar Mandaran-Kajla road. It is 2 km from Kamarpukur.

== Education ==
Gar Mandaran High School is a Bengali-medium co-educational institution. It was established in 1944.
