= Tanda, Bengal =

16th-century city of Bengal in South Asia

Tanda
- Tandah
- Location in West Bengal, India
- 25.15°N 87.75°E
- Type: Settlement
- Location: Bengal

History
- Built: 16th century

Tanda (Bengali: তান্ডা, lit. 'high ground'), also known as Tandah and Khwaspur Tandah, was a historic 16th-century city of Bengal in the eastern part of South Asia, and one of the most prominent medieval capitals; serving the Karrani Sultans of Bengal and the early Mughal governors of Bengal.

== Location ==
Tanda was located almost opposite from Gaur. It is located about 24.14 km south-east of Malda, 19.31 km west of the Teliagarhi Pass, and about 1.60 km from Lakshipur. In its time, it was located at the point where the Ganges separated into two branches.

== History ==
During the reign of Mughal emperor Humayun struck silver coins in Tanda in the late 1530s. According to numismatics, Tanda achieved mint town status in 1544 when the region was under the Sur Empire ruled by Sher Shah Suri. During the reign of the Sultan of Bengal Sulaiman Khan Karrani, the capital of Bengal was switched from Gaur to Tanda. From then on, it continued as the capital of Bengal's Karrani dynasty. Tanda continued to host a prominent mint up until 1576.

The rise of Mughal dominion in the region was led by the Bengal Subah's first Mughal governor Munim Khan. Defeating the Bengal Sultanate at the Battle of Tukaroi in 1575, the capital was switched back to Gaur. An epidemic plague in Gaur swiftly led to the death of Munim and many Mughal troops, allowing Sultan Daud Khan Karrani to regain control and reestablish Tanda as the capital. Karrani was defeated the following year at the Battle of Rajmahal by the following Mughal general, Khan Jahan I, who kept Tanda as the capital due to fear of plague in Gaur. Tanda was made a part of the Sarkar Udambar (commonly known as Sarkar Tanda), which included Rajmahal, Murshidabad, and North Birbhum.

In 1586, a gentleman merchant from London by the name of Ralph Fitch visited the city, describing it as prosperous whilst at the same time decaying due to the Ganges' course changing. Tanda remained the capital of Bengal up until the governorship of Man Singh I in the 1590s, who abandoned the city for Rajmahal.

According to Baharistan-i-Ghaibi of Mirza Nathan (later known as Shitab Khan), Tanda was noted for its stock of goods. Mirza Nathan's officer, Madari, purchased a shipload of lead, gunpowder, and bows and arrows. There was a notable dargah (shrine) located in the village of Malatipur in Tanda. This contained the tomb of Mir Syed Ahmad al-Husayni, who was a notable Muslim ascetic who lived in Malatipur and would receive hundreds of visitors. After his death, Ahmad was succeeded by his Sahib-i-Sajjada Mir Syed Nizam ad-Din as the chief Sufi of the town. During the reign of Emperor Jahangir, it was common for Mughal officers to visit the shrine and commemorate urs there, as done by Shitab Khan — a disciple of Fariduddin Ganjshakar. In April 1660, Prince Shah Shuja and his family briefly took shelter in Tanda whilst hiding from Mir Jumla II.

By 1826, Tanda had been destroyed by floods, thus disappearing into the river. Presently, Tanda is a heap of dust.
