= Kalapahar =

16th-century Muslim general of the Bengal Sultanate

Kālā Pahaṛ
- কালাপাহাড়
- Born: Bhurisrestha or Barendra (modern-day Rangpur/Rajshahi, Bangladesh or West Bengal, India)
- Died: 12 July 1576; Rajmahal
- Cause of death: Killed in action
- Burial place: Sambalpur
- Military career
- Allegiance: Bengal Sultanate
- Service years: 1567–1576
- Conflicts: See list: Bengal–Koch War (1567); Conquest of Orissa (1567–68); Mughal conquest of Bengal †; Rajmahal (1576)

Kālā Pahaṛ (Bengali: কালাপাহাড়; died 12 July 1576), also known as Kalapahada, was a Bengali Muslim General of the Bengal Sultanate under the reigning Karrani Dynasty.

According to traditional narratives pieced together since the late 18th century, Kalapahaṛ was a Bengali Brahmin from either Bhurisrestha or Barendra who was military commander of the Sultanate & fell in love with the Sultan Sulaiman Khan Karrani's daughter, which led him to convert to Islam in order to win her hand (or being excommunicated by the Brahmin pandits, who denied him prayaschitta) and solidified his position within the ruling Muslim elite of Bengal; this conversion is often associated with his change in name from Kalachand Ray/Rajibalochana Bhaduri to "Mohammad Farmuli."

== Historiography ==
The myths and legends around Kalapahad were propagated in the 19th century, three centuries after his existence. Lalatendu Das Mohapatra, assistant director of the records center, National Archives in Bhubaneswar questions over the historiography: "The origin of Kalapahad is confusing because there are Persian manuscripts at the British museum where Allahabadi Kalapahad has been mentioned, while in an Odia manuscript of the 1600s, there is a mention of Illahdat Kalapahad,"

== Military campaigns ==
Sultan Sulaiman sent his army to conquer Odisha to expand his Sultanate under the command of his son "Bayazid and general Kalapahaṛ alias Raju". They defeated and killed the king Mukundadeva. The general Kalapahaṛ led a contingent deep into the kingdom to plunder it.

He also successfully fought the Kamatapur army after its king Naranarayana had attacked the Sultanate; Naranarayana's brother, the military general Sukladhwaja was imprisoned and the capital Gosanimari seized. However, fearing an attack from the Mughal armies (as Naranarayana had nominally accepted Akbar as his overlord), Sultan Sulaiman ordered Kalapahaṛ to withdraw and restored status-quo. In 1575, the Sultan's son Bayazid was treacherously murdered. Kalapahar rallied around Daud Karrani who ascended to the throne of the Bengal Sultanate but were defeated at Battle of Rajmahal in July 1576.

== Legacy ==
The term Kalapahaṛ (or Black Mountain in English) has come to mean iconoclast among the Hindu population in East and Northeast India due to his personal involvement in the desecration & sacking of the multiple Hindu temples during his military campaigns, most notably the Jagannath Temple of Puri, the Sun temple of Konark, the Jalpesh Temple in Jalpaiguri, temples of Hajo, and allegedly the Kamakhya temple of Guwahati on religious grounds. Legend has it that he also tried to sack the temple of Bargabhima in Tamluk and that of Sambaleshwari in Sambalpur but failed due to divine intervention.

In March 2021, the Indian Minister of Home Affairs Amit Shah referred to AIUDF leader Badruddin Ajmal as Kalapahaṛ. He also inaved Mandar hill shich now in Bounsi

== See also ==
- History of Bengal
- History of Odisha
- History of India
- Bengali Muslims
