= Taj Khan Karrani =

Sultan of Bengal from 1564 to 1565

Taj Khan Karrani (r. 1564–1565) (Bengali: তাজ খান কররানী; Persian: تاج خان کرانی) was the founder of the Karrani dynasty, an Afghan dynasty of Karlani origin that ruled Bengal, Orissa and parts of Bihar.

== Biography ==
Taj Khan Karrani was a former employee of Sher Shah Suri. At the time of anarchy following the death of Islam Shah Suri around 1553, he fled to the Gangatic Doab. The last Sur emperor, Adil Shah Suri chased and defeated him at Chibra-mow or Chhatramau, about 18 miles south of Farrukhabad. However Taj managed to escape and joined his brothers, 'Imad, Sulaiman Khan, and Khwaja I'lyas, who held several district on the banks of Ganges at Khawaspur and Tanda. They then seized Adil's treasury, troops (Halka) of hundred elephants, and a large number of Afghans joined them. In 1554, Adil Shah's general Hemu attacked and defeated them.

=== Capture of Bengal ===
After the defeat against Hemu, Taj and his brother Sulaiman Khan Karrani fled to Bengal where he became powerful by exploiting the internecine warfare among his rivals. In his next step at some point, Delhi was reconquered by Humayun, the second Mughal emperor. In Bengal he carefully exploited the internecine warfare, assassinating Giyasuddin Bahadur Shah III, before capturing a vast region of south-eastern Bihar and west Bengal, thus founding the Karrani dynasty in Bengal. His authority was established over western Bengal including Gauda, south-eastern districts of Bihar. Taj died in 1565 and his brother, Sulaiman Khan Karrani, succeeded him.

== See also ==
- List of rulers of Bengal
- History of Bengal
- History of West Bengal
- History of India
- Sur Empire

== Bibliography ==
- Sarkar, Jadunath, ed. (2003) [First published 1943]. The History of Bengal. Vol. II: Muslim Period. Delhi: B.R. Publishing Corporation. ISBN 81-7646-239-X.
- Eaton, Richard M. (1993). The Rise of Islam and the Bengal Frontier, 1204-1760. University of California Press. ISBN 0-520-20507-3.

Preceded by Giyasuddin Bahadur Shah III	Karrani dynasty 1564-1565	Succeeded by Sulaiman Khan Karrani
