= Kaliasole =

Kaliasole Keliasole
- Village
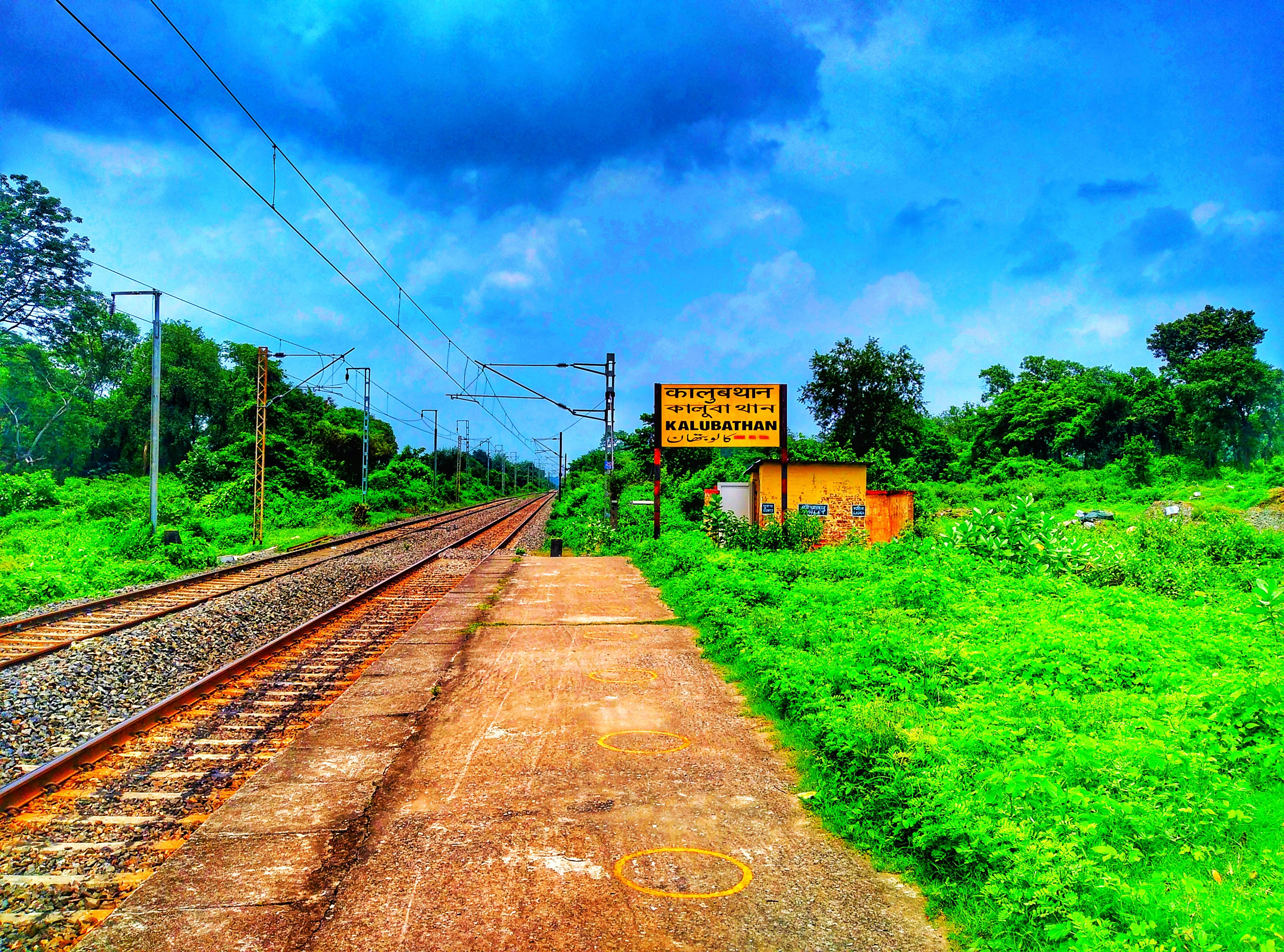
- Kalubathan railway station

- Location in Jharkhand, India Kaliasole (India)
- Coordinates: 23.7413°N 86.6554°E
- Country: India
- State: Jharkhand
- District: Dhanbad
- CD Block: Kaliasole

Government
  - Body: Kaliasole Panchayat
- Elevation: 150 m (490 ft)

Languages
  - Official: Hindi, Urdu
- Time zone: UTC+5:30 (IST)
- PIN: 828205
- Telephone/ STD code: 06540
- Vehicle registration: JH-10
- Website: dhanbad.nic.in

Kaliasole (also spelled Keliasole and Keliyasole) is a village in Kaliasole (community development block) in Dhanbad Sadar subdivision of Dhanbad district of State Capital Ranchi in the Indian state of Jharkhand.

== Geography ==
Cities, towns and locations in the eastern portion of Dhanbad Sadar subdivision in Dhanbad district
M: Municipality, CT: census town, N: Neighbourhood, R: Rural/ Urban centre, D: Dam, P: Power Plant
Owing to space constraints in the small map, the actual locations in a larger map may vary slightly

=== Rivers and Lakes ===
The Damodar is the nearest river and a major river of the Chota Nagpur Plateau.

=== Location ===
Kaliasole is located at 23.7413°N 86.6554°E.

Kaliasole village is also a gram panchayat and is the central market for the surrounding villages Kalubathan, Simuldone, Kayrabank, Dainkata, Lakshipur, Patharkua, Dhobari, Urma, Dumurya, Daldali, Bandrabad.

Note: The map alongside presents some of the notable locations in the area. All places marked in the map are linked in the larger full screen map.

=== Overview ===
The region shown in the map is a part of the undulating uplands bustling with coalmines. While the Damodar flows along the southern boundary, the Barakar flows along the eastern boundary. Both the rivers form the boundary with West Bengal. Panchet Dam and Maithon Dam, along with their reservoirs, are prominently visible in the map. The entire area is covered in Kaliasole (community development block). Kaliasole was under Nirsa (community development block) before July 2019. In Nirsa CD block 69% of the population live in rural areas and 31% live in urban areas. The official website of the district has announced the formation of two new CD blocks – Egarkund and Kaliasole, possibly carved out of Nirsa CD block. As of July 2019, there is no further information about the new CD blocks. BCCL operates Chanch/ Victoria Area partially within the region shown in the map. ECL operates Mugma Area fully within the region shown in the map.

== Demographics ==
As per the 2011 Census of India, Kaliasole had a total population of 1,985 of which 1,006 (51%) were males and 979 (49%) were females. Population below 6 years was 275. The total number of literates in Kaliasole was 1,320 (77.19% of the population over 6 years).

== Education ==
There is an intermediate college in Kaliasole for higher education named Inter College Keliasole located at Lalpahari.

Pramatha Nath Khetra Nath (abbreviated PNKN) High School and Rajkiyakrit Middle School are the government schools located at Kaliasole.

== Transport ==
Kalubathan (station code: KAO) is the nearest Railway Station in the Eastern Railway zone of Asansol Division.

== Gallery ==
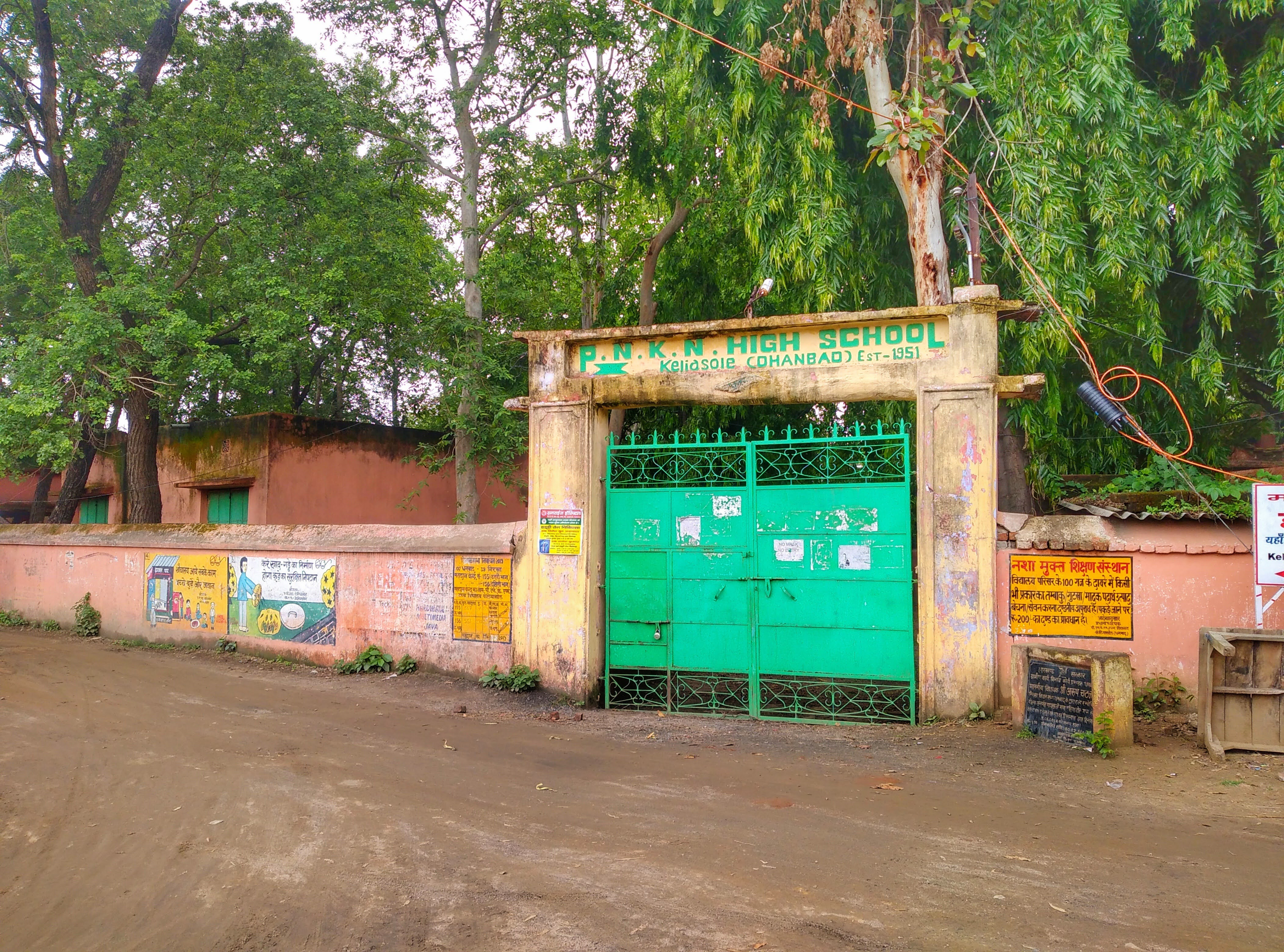
PNKN High School Keliasole

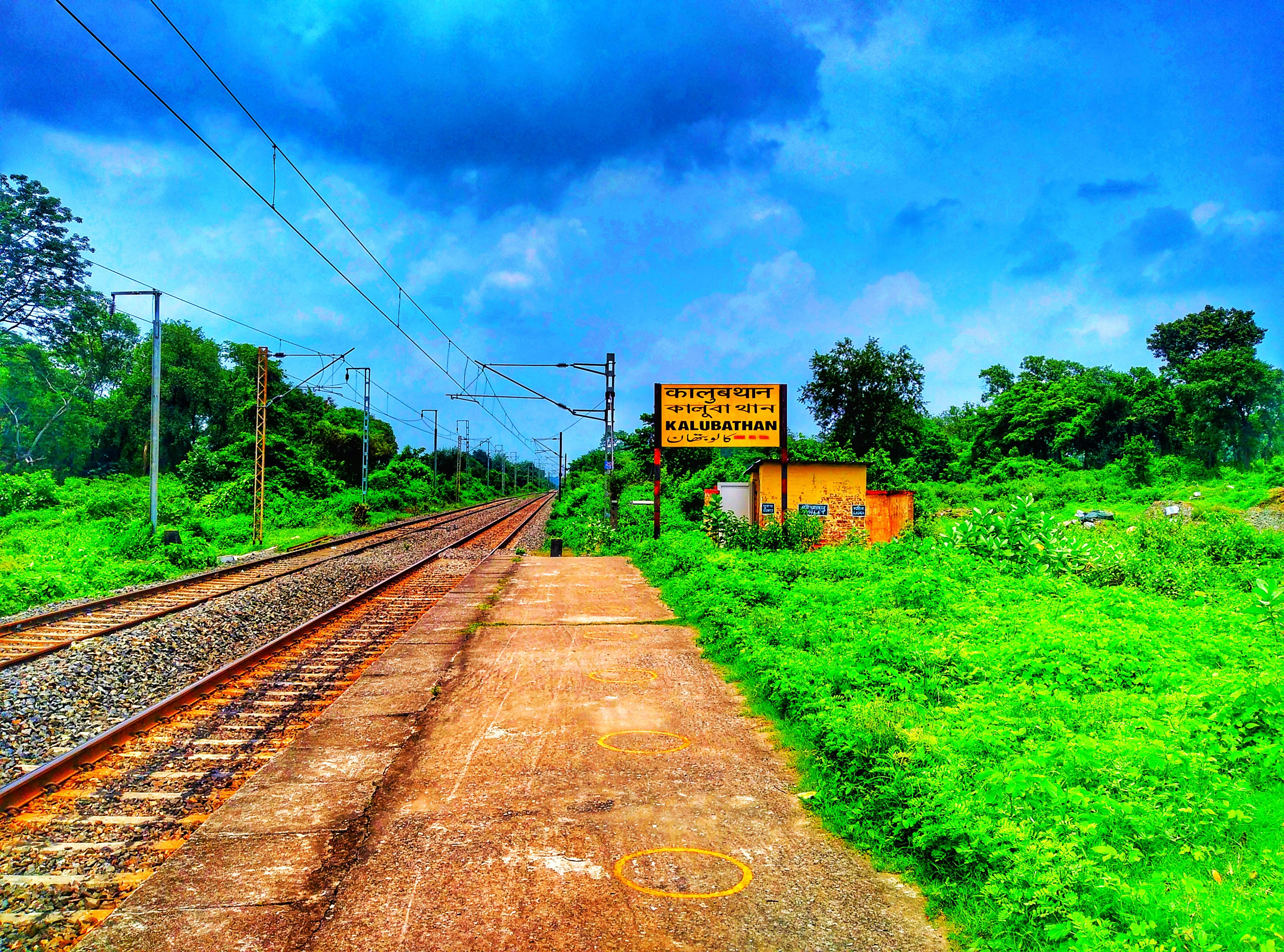
Kalubathan Railway Station(KAO)

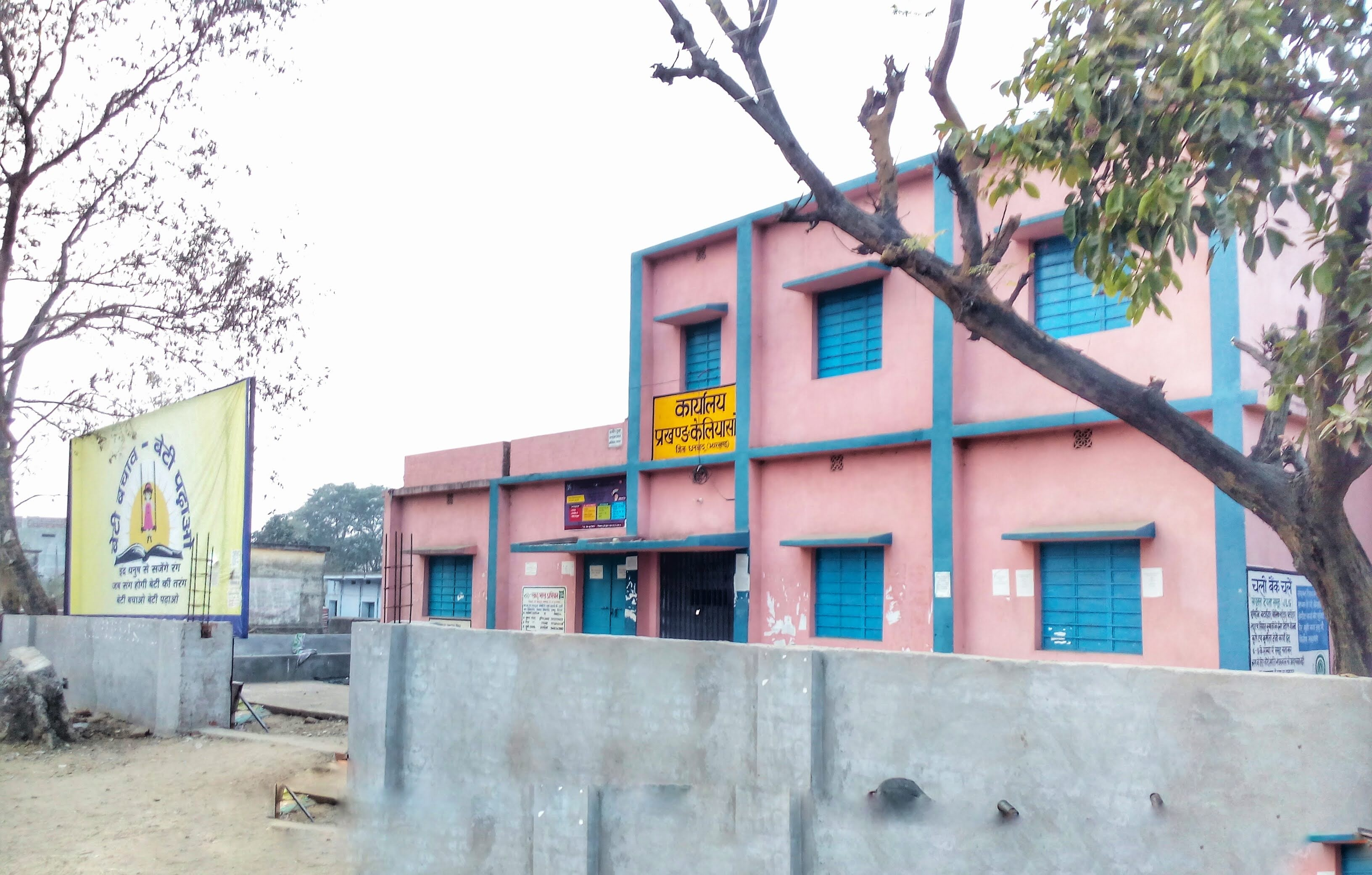
Panchayat Bhavan Keliasole
