= Karrani dynasty =

Bengali dynasty from Afghan dissent (1564–1576)

Karlāṇī / Kôrrāṇī: کرلاڼي; কররাণী
- Royal house
- Parent family: Bangash tribe
- Current region: Bengal Sultanate
- Earlier spellings: Kerrani
- Origin: Kurram Valley
- Founded: 1564
- Founder: Taj Khan Karrani
- Final ruler: Daud Khan Karrani
- Members: Sulaiman Khan Karrani, Bayazid Khan Karrani, Bayazid of Sylhet
- Estate: Tanda
- Dissolution: 1612
- Deposition: 1576

The Karrani dynasty (Pashto: کرلاڼي, romanized: Karlāṇī, Bengali: কররাণী, romanized: Kôrrāṇī) was a late-medieval royal dynasty that ruled the restored Bengal Sultanate between 1564 and 1576. Founded by Taj Khan Karrani, an Afghan from the Pashtun Karlani tribe hailing from Bangash, it was the last independent dynasty to rule Bengal, before the region became a Subah of the Mughal Empire.

== History ==
=== Founding ===
Taj Khan was formerly an employee of the Sur Emperor Sher Shah Suri. From 1562 to 1564, Taj Khan captured south-eastern Bihar and West Bengal, and with his assassination of the last Muhammed Shahi ruler, he seized all of Bengal. The capital was at Gaur. Taj Khan was followed by his brother Sulaiman Khan Karrani, who shifted the seat of government from Gaur to Tanda (also in Malda) in 1565. In 1568, Sulaiman Khan annexed Orissa to the Karrani sultanate permanently. Nominally he accepted sovereignty of the Mughal Emperor Akbar, and his prime minister Lodi Khan placated the Mughals with gifts and banqueting. Sulaiman Khan's authority extended from Koch Bihar to Puri, and from Son River to Brahmaputra River.

=== Mughal invasion ===
On 25 September 1574, the Mughal general Munim Khan captured the Karrani capital Tanda. The Battle of Tukaroi fought on 3 March 1575 forced Daud Khan Karrani, the last Karrani ruler, to withdraw to Orissa. The battle led to the Treaty of Katak in which Daud ceded the whole of Bengal and Bihar, retaining only Orissa. The treaty eventually failed after the death of Munim Khan at the age of 50 in October 1575. Daud Khan took the opportunity and invaded Bengal, declaring independence from Akbar. The Mughal onslaught against the Karrani sultanate ended with the Battle of Rajmahal on 12 July 1576, led by the Mughal general Khan Jahan I. Daud Khan was executed. However, the Pashtuns and the local landlords known as Baro Bhuyans led by Isa Khan continued to resist the Mughal invasion. Later in 1612 during the reign of Jahangir, Bengal was decisively consolidated as a Mughal province.

== List of rulers ==
Name	Reign
Sultan Taj Khan Karrani سلطان تاج خان کرلاڼی; Bengali: সুলতান তাজ খাঁন কররাণী	1564–1565
Sultan Sulayman Khan Karrani سلطان سلیمان خان کرلاڼی; Bengali: সুলতান সুলেমান খাঁন কররাণী	1565–1572
Sultan Bayazid Khan Karrani سلطان بایزید خان کرلاڼی; Bengali: সুলতান বায়েজ়ীদ খাঁন কররাণী	1572
Sultan Dawud Khan Karrani سلطان داود خان کرلاڼی; Bengali: সুলতান দাঊদ খাঁন কররাণী	1572–1576

Preceded by Muhammad Shahi dynasty	Sultans of Bengal; 1564–1576	Succeeded by Mughal dynasty (end of Bengal Sultanate)

== Family tree ==
Karrani Dynasty

Unnamed
Taj Khan ?–1565; Sultan of Bengal; R.1564–1565	Sulaiman Khan ?–1572; Sultan of Bengal; R.1565–1572
Bayazid Khan ?–1572; Sultan of Bengal; R.1572	Daud Khan ?–1576; Sultan of Bengal; R.1572–1576

== See also ==
- Sur Empire
- Lodi dynasty
- Mughal Dynasty
- Asaf Jahi Dynasty
- Durrani Dynasty
- Koch dynasty
