= Battle of Rajmahal =

1576 battle during the Mughal invasion of Bengal

- Part of Mughal invasion of Bengal
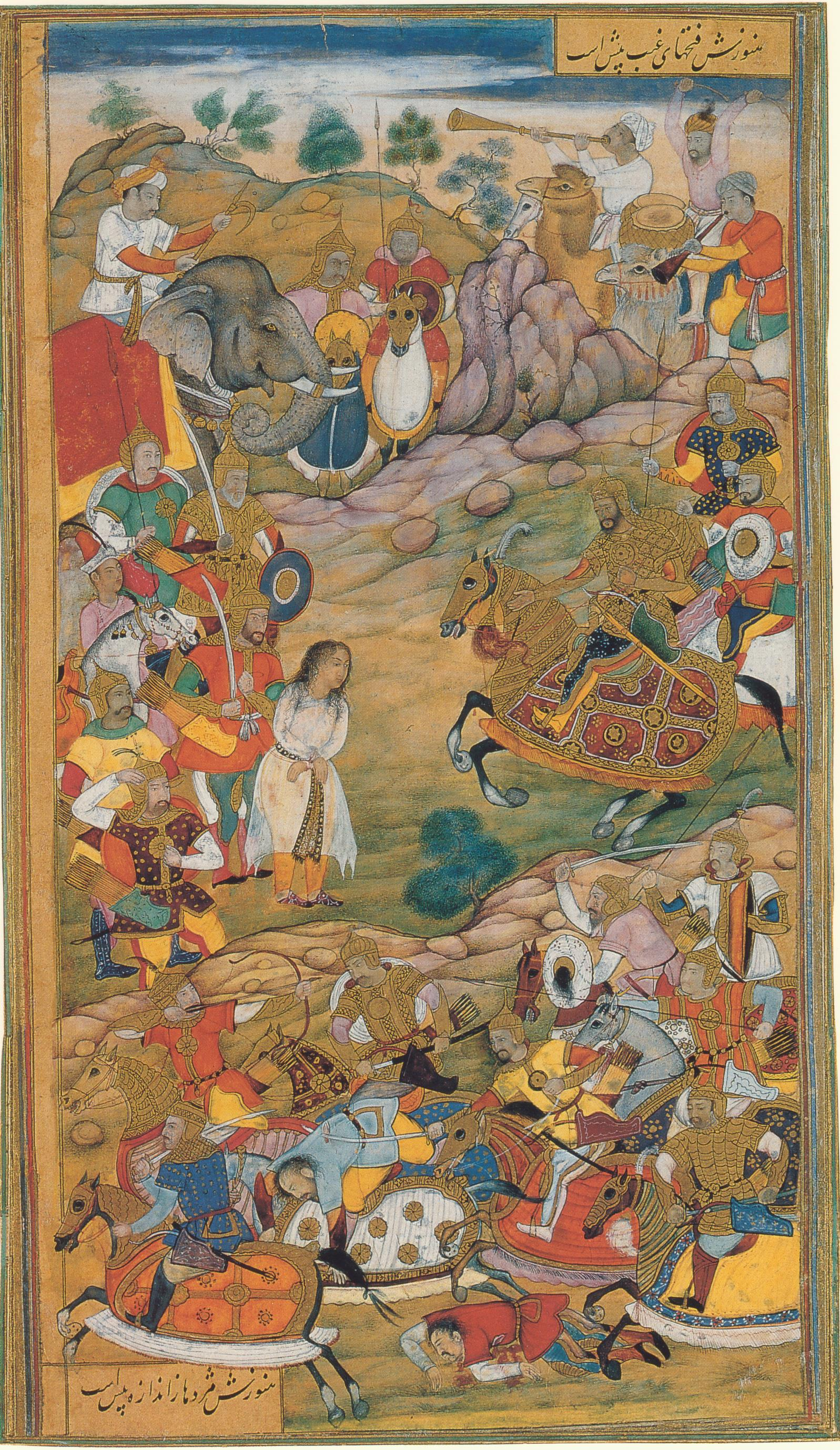
- 1590 miniature painting of the battle
Date	12 July 1576
Location	Rajmahal, Bengal Sultanate (present-day Jharkhand, India)
Result	Mughal victory

Belligerents
Bengal Sultanate	Mughal Empire

Commanders and leaders
Daud Khan (executed); Junaid Khan †; Ismail Khan; Kalapahad; Qutlu Khan	Akbar; Muzaffar Khan; Jahan Khan; Todar Mal

Strength
50,000	150,000 (during the first assault); 5,000 cavalry reinforcement

Casualties and losses
Unknown	Unknown

The Battle of Rajmahal (Bengali: রাজমহলের যুদ্ধ) took place between the Mughal Empire and the Karrani Dynasty that ruled the Sultanate of Bengal in the 16th century. The battle resulted in a decisive victory for the Mughals. During the battle, the last Sultan of Bengal, Daud Khan Karrani, was captured and later executed by the Mughals.

== Background ==
The battle of Rajmahal introduced the Mughal regime in Bengal. After the death of the last sultan of Hussain Shahi dynasty Ghiyasuddin Mahmud Shah in 1538, the liberated sultanate of Bengal reached its end. Despite occupying the capital city of Gaur, Humayun, the second emperor of the Mughal Empire, was able to hold the control for only a short period of time. The founder of the Sur Dynasty, Sher Shah Suri defeated Humayun in the Battle of Chausa and took control over Bengal. Later, the Karrani dynasty emerged in Bengal. The last ruler of the Karranis, Sultan Daud Khan Karrani refused to hail Akbar and clashed with the Mughals. Daud Khan was defeated by the Mughal general Munim Khan at the Battle of Tukaroi.

On 12 April 1575, the Treaty of Katak concluded the malevolence between the two parties. Consequently, Daud Khan failed to hold control over Bengal and Bihar. Only the rights of Orissa were left to him. The treaty however did not go on for long. Isa Khan, the chief of the Baro-Bhuians, expelled the Mughal Navy from Bengal. After the death of the Mughal general Munim Khan, Daud Khan started a campaign to conquer the lost territory. He was able to conquer North and West Bengal.

== Battle ==
Akbar sent his general Khan-i-Jahan Husain Quli Beg to conquer Bengal from Daud Khan. Daud Khan's generals were Kalapahar, Junaid and Qutlu Khan. Khan gathered about three thousand troops at Teliagarhi.

The Afghans fought the Mughals at Teliagarhi. In the battle, the Mughals captured Teliagarhi. The Mughals then proceeded towards Rajmahal, which had been under siege for about four months by the Mughal general Husain Quli Beg. As an additional aid to the Mughals, Muzaffar Khan Turbati, the ruler of Bihar, came forward with five thousand cavalry and supplies by sea. Although the Mughals were ahead in terms of strength, they fell into climatic problems.

Then the battle took place between the combined forces of the Mughals and the Karranis in Rajmahal on 12 July 1576. Daud Khan, Junaid, Kalapahar and Qutlu Khan led the middle, left, right and front of the army respectively.

== Aftermath ==
The Karranis were defeated in this battle. Daud Khan was captured and killed. With the fall of the Karrani dynasty, the Bengal Sultanate came to an end and Bengal became a subah or province of the Mughal Empire. However, under the leadership of Isa Khan, the Baro-Bhuyans continued to resist the Mughals. As a result, the Mughals could not get full control over Bengal until Isa Khan's death in 1599.

== See also ==
- Battle of Plassey
