= Kalubathan =

- Village
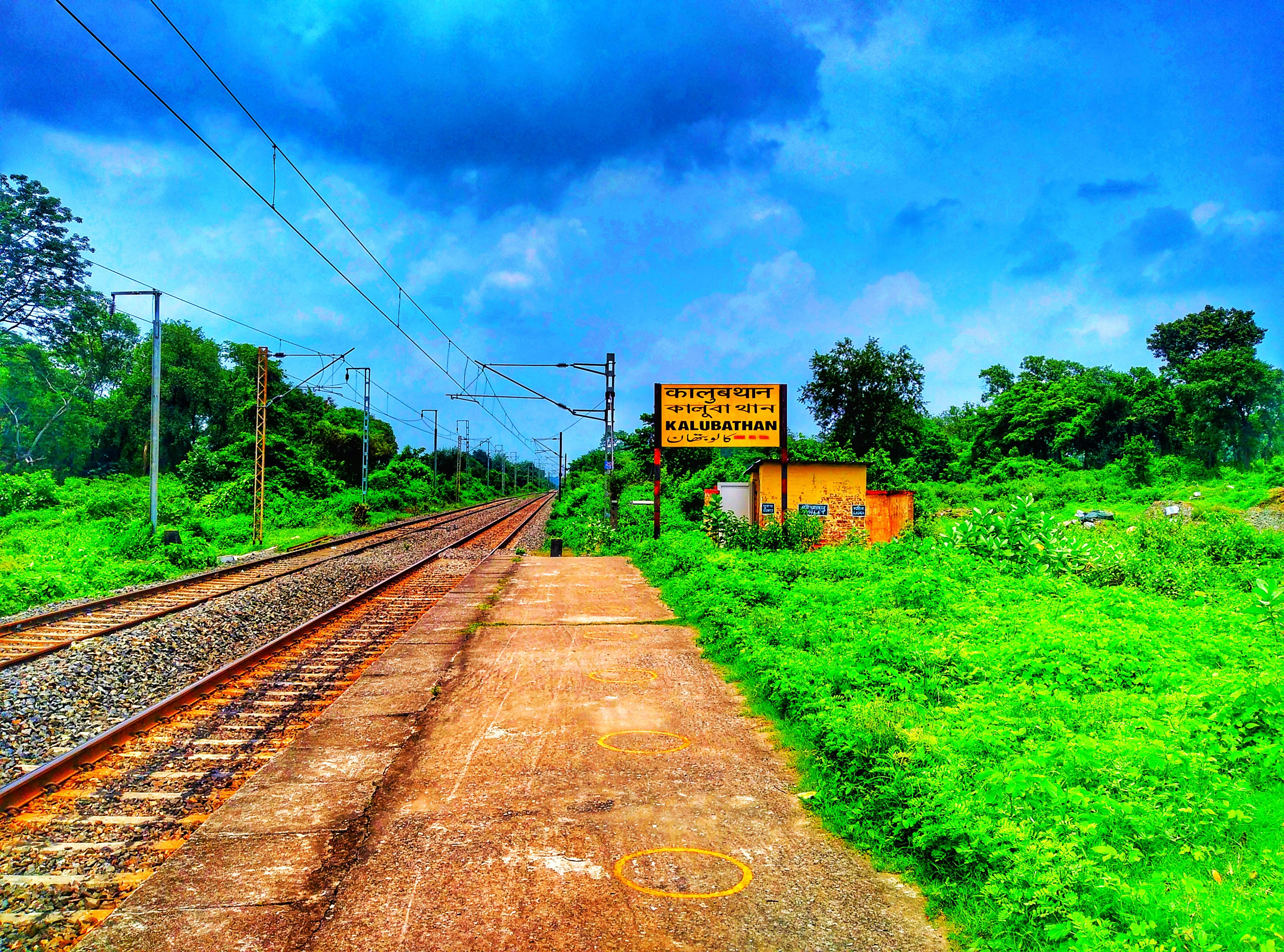
- Kalubathan railway station

- Location in Jharkhand, India Kalubathan (India)
- Coordinates: 23.7550776°N 86.6508657°E
- Country: India
- State: Jharkhand
- District: Dhanbad
- CD Block: Kaliasole

Government
  - Type: Representative Democracy
  - Body: Kaliasole Panchayat

Area
  - Total: 2.62 km^{2} (1.01 sq mi)
- Elevation: 150 m (490 ft)

Population (2011 Census of India)
  - Total: 1,206
  - Density: 460/km^{2} (1,190/sq mi)

Languages
  - Official: Bengali, Hindi
- Time zone: UTC+5:30 (IST)
- PIN: 828205
- Telephone/ STD code: 06540
- Vehicle registration: JH-10
- Website: dhanbad.nic.in

Kalubathan is a village in the Kaliasole community development block of Dhanbad district in the Indian state of Jharkhand. It is part of the Kaliasole Gram Panchayat.

Kalubathan is surrounded by villages like Kaliasole, Simuldone, Kayrabank, Dainkata, Lakshipur, Patharkua, Dhobari, Urma, Dumurya, Daldali, Bandrabad.

Kalubathan railway station (station code: KAO) is a railway station in Kalubathan, in the Eastern Railway zone's Asansol division.

== Geography ==
Kalubathan is located at 23.7550776°N 86.6508657°E.Kalubathan is surrounded by natural beauty and villages like Kaliasole, Simuldone, Kayrabank, Dainkata, Lakshipur, Patharkua, Dhobari, Urma, Dumurya, Daldali, Bandrabad is an admirable place with almost all the necessary facilities available.

== Demographics ==
As per the 2011 Census of India, Kalubathan had a total population of 1206 of which 660 (55%) were males and 546 (45%) were females. Population below 6 years was 173. The total number of literates in Kalubathan was 770.

== Gallery ==
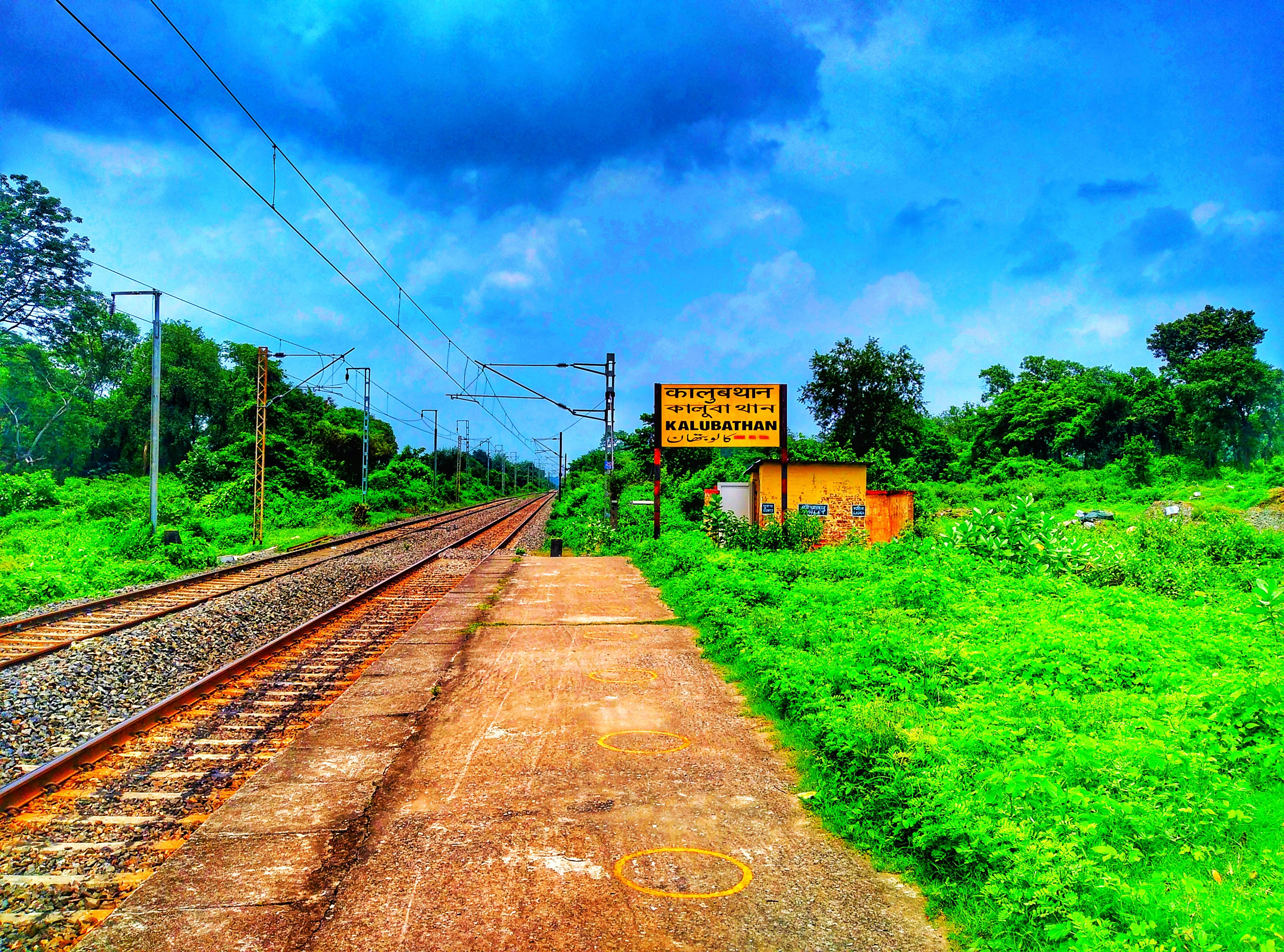
Kalubathan Railway Station(KAO)

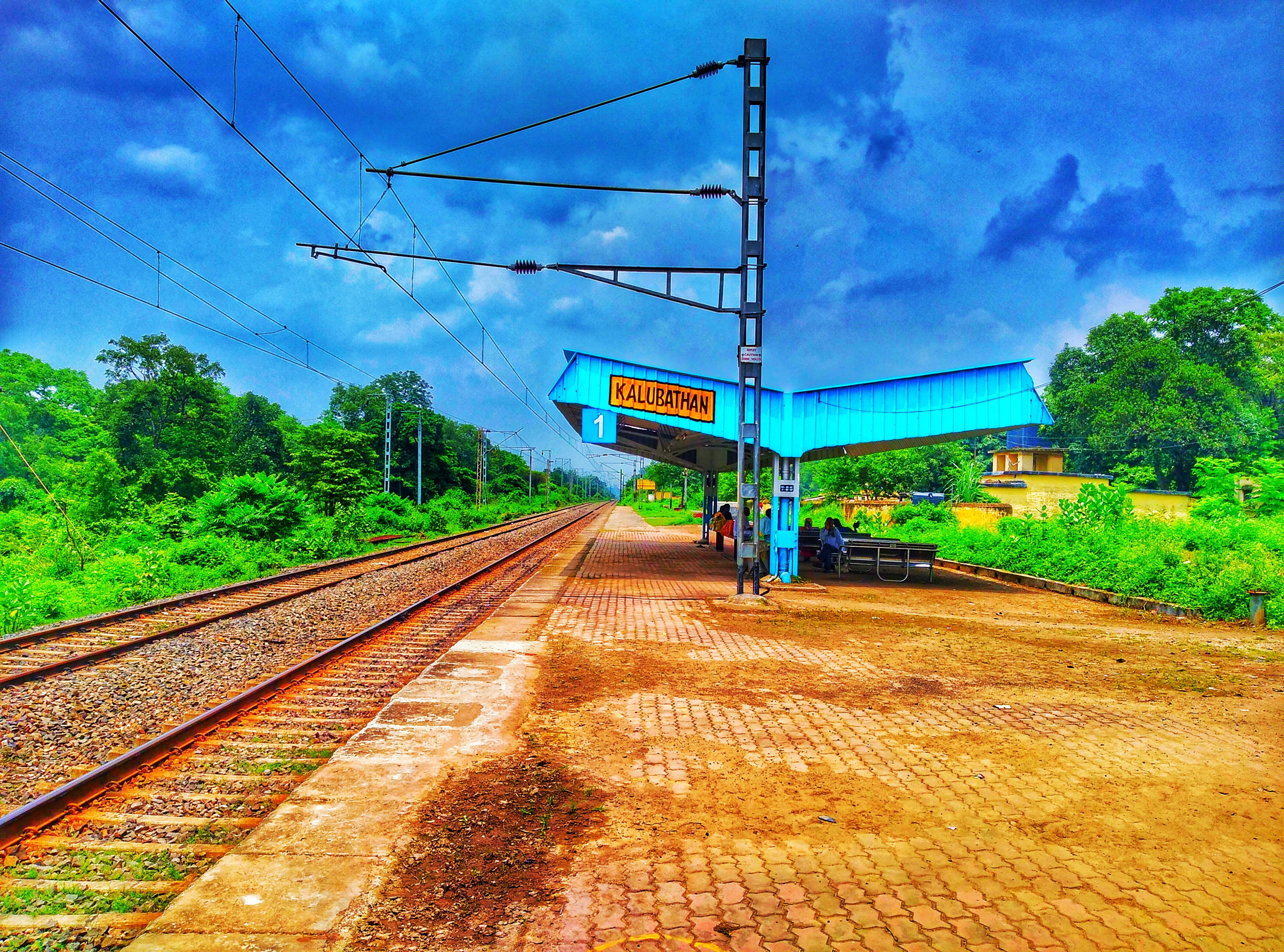
Platform One Kalubathan Railway Station (KAO)
