= Bengal Sultanate conquest of Orissa =

Conquest of Odisha by Bengal Sultanate

Date	1568
Location	Odisha 20°31′25″N 85°47′17″E
Result	Bengal Sultanate victory
Territorial changes	Orissa annexed to Bengal Sultanate

Belligerents
Bengal Sultanate	House of Chalukya

Commanders and leaders
Sulaiman Khan Karrani; Bayazid Khan Karrani; Kalapahar; Sikandar Uzbak	Mukunda Deva †; Koni Samanta Simhara †; Chhota Rai †
- Map of Cuttack, the capital of Mukunda Deva Bengal Sultanate conquest of Orissa (India)

The Bengal sultanate conquest of Orissa in 1568 was a military campaign led by the Karrani dynasty of the Bengal Sultanate under Sulaiman Khan Karrani. The objective was to overthrow the Chalukyan rule of Orissa (now Odisha) under Mukunda Deva and the rebellion led by Sarangagarh feudatory Ramachandra Bhanja. The Bengal forces achieved victory, resulting in the annexation of Odisha into the Sultanate. Odisha remained part of the Bengal Sultanate until its eventual annexation by the Mughal Empire in 1592.

== Background ==
=== Prelude ===
Ibrahim Shah Suri, defeated by Adil Shah Suri due to his rebellion against the Sur dynasty, sought refuge in Bengal. However, Sulaiman Karrani, the Karrani ruler of Bengal, attempted to detain Ibrahim Khan Suri. Recognizing the danger, Ibrahim Khan Suri appealed to Mukunda Deva, the ruler of Odisha, for shelter and assistance in 1559 AD. Mukunda Deva, of Chalukya descent, ascended to the throne by ousting Raghuram Raya Chotaraya, the Bhoi ruler of Odisha.

Responding to Ibrahim's plea, Mukunda Deva not only offered refuge but also granted him land as a mark of honour. Mukunda Deva firmly rejected surrendering Ibrahim to the Karranis, sparking animosity from Sulaiman, the ruler of Bengal.

=== Involvement of the Mughals ===
By this time, the Mughal Empire, led by Humayun, achieved victory over Sikander Shah Suri at the Battle of Sirhind, successfully reinstating Mughal rule over India. This triumph marked the recovery of territories that had previously been lost to Sher Shah Suri. One year following the Battle of Sirhind, Humayun died, leading to Akbar ascending to the throne of the Mughal Empire.

In 1565 Mukunda Dev received embassy from Akbar. Recognizing tensions between the Bengalis and the Odias, Akbar, with the aim of annexing Bengal into the Mughal Empire, chose to support the Odias. Establishing diplomatic ties with Mukunda Deva, he forged an alliance. Akbar dispatched Hasan Khan Khajanchi and Bhatta Mahapatra, an Odiya musician from the Mughal Court, as envoys to Mukunda Deva's court. Their mission was to secure support in case of a conflict with the Sultan of Bengal. He swore allegiance to Akbar and promised to send Ibrahim to invade Bengal if Sulaiman Karrani revolted against the Mughals.

The envoys spent four months at Mukunda Deva's court and returned with valuable gifts and elephants. Simultaneously, Mukunda Deva's ambassador, Parmanand, accompanied them to the Imperial Court. This diplomatic manoeuvring marked the beginning of an alliance between Akbar and Mukunda Deva.

Mukunda Deva's alliance with the Mughals heightened the animosity between him and Sulaiman, prompting the latter to launch a campaign against the Chalukyas. Concurrently, Mukunda Deva seized a portion of Karrani territory, provoking swift retaliation.

== The conquest ==
In January 1567, Mukunda Deva launched an invasion of Bengal, having a victory over the Bengal forces and amassing significant wealth. Setting up camp along the banks of the Ganges, he engaged in military exercises, including boat manoeuvres on the river. Remarkably, this marked the final instance when the Odisha army reached the banks of the Ganga. In the winter of 1567, as Akbar was besieging the Chittor fort, Sulaiman seized the opportunity to invade Odisha.

The Karrani army operated in two divisions: one led by Sulaiman Karrani and the other by Bayezid, Sulaiman's son, assisted by Kalapahar. Bayezid was accompanied by a former Mughal general Sikandar Uzbak. Advancing towards Odisha, the Bengal forces reached the coastal area near Balasore. Realizing the absence of support from the Mughals, Mukunda dispatched an army led by his trusted officers, Chhota Rai and Raghubhanja. But these officers betrayed Mukunda and defected to the Bengal side against their own ruler.

== Outcome ==
The records present two different accounts of the outcome of this campaign.

=== First version ===
According to Madala Panji, the Bengal army, led by Sulaiman, engaged in a conflict with Mukunda's Chalukya forces. In this encounter, Mukunda's forces suffered defeat and sought refuge within the Kotsimul fort in the Hoogly district of West Bengal. Simultaneously, another segment of the Bengal army, commanded by Bayezid and Kala Pahar, laid siege to Cuttack, the capital of Odisha, against Koni Samanta Simhara. In this confrontation, Simhara was defeated and killed.

During this period, Ramachandra Bhanja, the feudatory of Sarangagarh, staged a revolt and proclaimed himself as the ruler. Acknowledging this development, Mukunda Deva made a treaty with the Karranis and moved to confront Ramachandra. However, in the ensuing battle, Mukunda Deva was defeated and killed by Ramachandra. Later, Ramachandra was killed by Sulaiman on the following day. In the same manner, he forced Ibrahim Sur to surrender and killed.

=== Second version ===
The alternate account of this event, as presented in the Akbarnama, indicates that Mukunda Deva met his demise in the battle fought at Jajpur. According to this version, the Karranis emerged victorious, defeating the Chalukyas.

The first version is widely regarded as the most accurate account. Kalapahar, the commander of the Karrani dynasty, inflicted a severe blow to the art and architecture of Odisha by destroying temples and images. This destructive episode is considered a significant tragedy in the cultural heritage of the region.

== Aftermath ==
Thus, in 1568, Orissa's medieval independence came to an end. Subsequently, Orissan prestige suffered, with local kings becoming mere puppets under Muslim governors. Orissa remained a part of the Bengal Sultanate until it was annexed by the Mughal Empire.

== Bibliography ==
- Sarkar, Jadunath, ed. (1943). The History of Bengal. Vol. II: Muslim Period. Delhi: B.R. Publishing Corporation. ISBN 81-7646-239-X.
