= Todar Mal =

Finance minister to Mughal emperor Akbar (1523/24–1589)

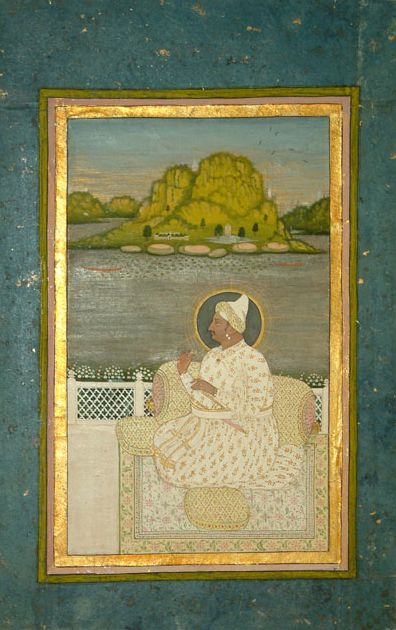
- Mughal painting of Todar Mal

Diwan-i-Wazarat of the Mughal Empire
- In office 1560 – 1589
- Monarch: Akbar I
- Preceded by: Khwaja Malik I'timad Khan
- Succeeded by: Kalyan Das

Personal details
- Born: 1523/24 Laharpur, Delhi Sultanate (present-day Uttar Pradesh, India)
- Died: 8 November 1589 (aged 86) Lahore, Lahore Subah, Mughal Empire (present-day Punjab, Pakistan)
- Religion: Hinduism
- Military career
- Allegiance: Mughal Empire
- Service: Mughal Army: Mughal Artillery
- Service years: 1560–1589
- Rank: Mansabdar

Military service
- Battles/wars: Mughal–Bengal wars: Battle of Tukaroi; Battle of Rajmahal

Raja Todar Mal (1523/24 – 8 November 1589) was an Indian minister, economist, writer and military commander who served as the finance minister (Dēwān-i-Aśraf) of the Mughal Empire during the reign of Akbar. He was also the Wakīl as-Salt̤anat (Counsellor of the Empire) and the joint Wazir.

He was one of the premier nobles in the empire and was a mansabdar of 4000. He was one of the Navaratnas in Akbar's court. Under Todar Mal, there were 15 other dewans nominated for 15 subahs of Akbar.

== Life ==
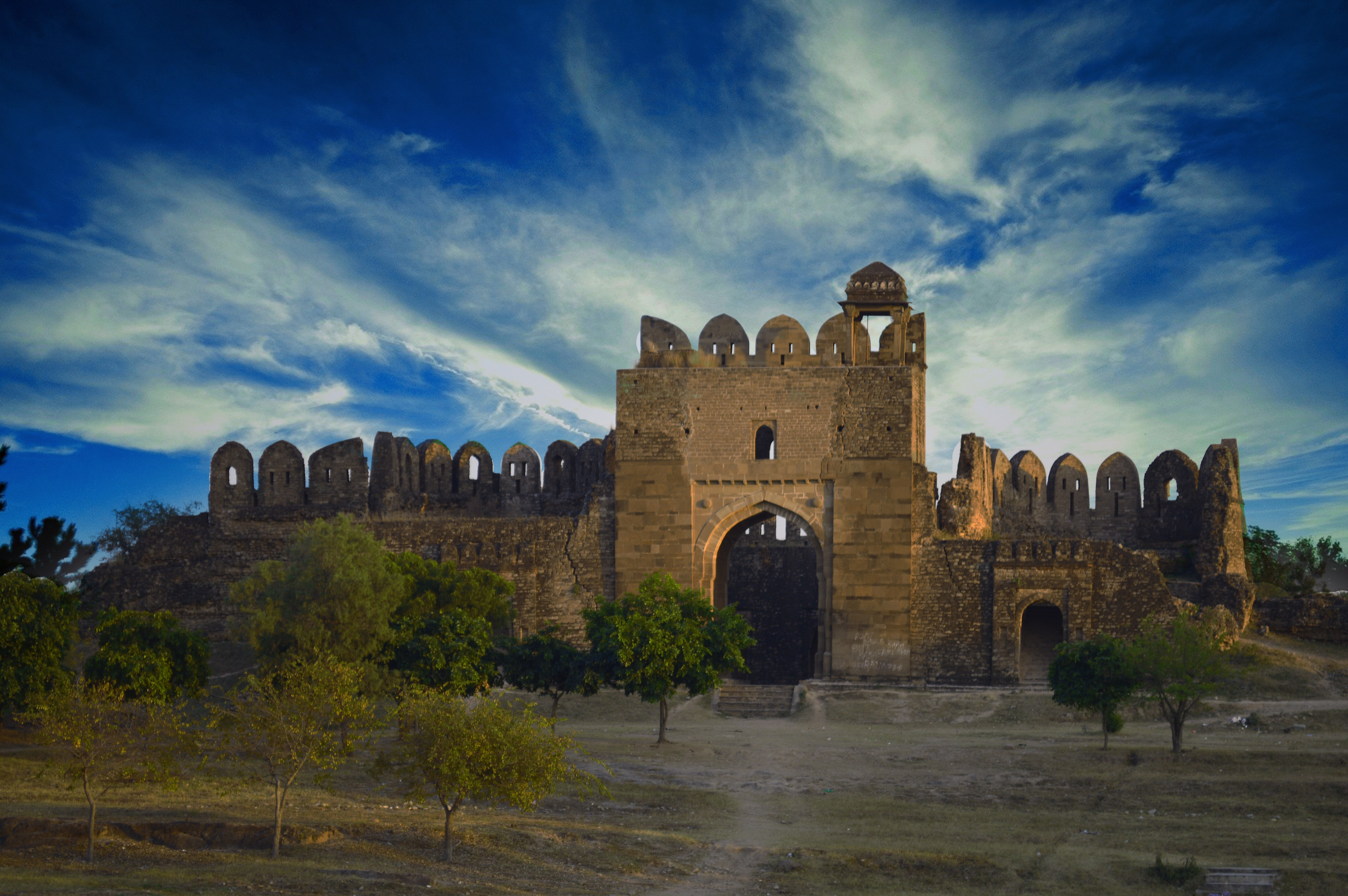
Rohtas Fort, built under Todar Mal.

Todar Mal was born in the town of Laharpur in Awadh, in the Sitapur district what is now Uttar Pradesh, to a Hindu family of Khatri or Kayastha caste from Punjab. Todar Mal's father died when he was very young, leaving no means of livelihood for him. Todar Mal started his career from the humble position of a writer but slowly moved up the ranks when Sher Shah Suri, the Sur emperor, assigned him to the charge of building a new fort of Rohtas in Punjab with the objective of preventing Gakhar raids and to also act as a barrier to the Mughals in the north-west.

After the Sur dynasty was overthrown by the Mughals, Todar Mal continued in the service of the ruling power, which was now the Mughal Emperor Akbar. Under Akbar, he was placed in charge of Agra. Later, he was made governor of Gujarat. At various times, he also managed Akbar's Mint at Bengal and served in Punjab. Todar Mal's most significant contribution, which is appreciated even today, is that he overhauled the revenue system of Akbar's Mughal empire. Todar Mal built a fortress-palace at Laharpur and also translated the Bhagavata Purana into Persian. He also commissioned a work on law and ethics called Todarnanda.

Beveridge records that Todar Mal had got leave from Akbar and was on his way to Haridwar, but he received a letter from Akbar in which the latter is said to have written that "it was better to go on working and doing good to the world than to go on a pilgrimage." Believing it morally wrong to disobey the emperor, he returned to resume his duties in Lahore, where he died a few days later on November 8, 1589, at the age of 86. Following his death in Lahore, his body was cremated according to Hindu traditions. Raja Bhagwan Das, his colleague in charge of Lahore, was present at the ceremony. Of his two sons, Dhari was killed in a battle in Sindh. Another son, Kalyan Das, was sent by Todar Mal to subdue the Raja of Kumaon in the Himalayas. He rose to become the Finance Minister in Akbar's Darbar.

== As a soldier ==
Todar Mal is recognized as an able warrior who led in various battles.

In 1571, he was employed under Muzaffar and in 1572, he served under Akbar against Khan Zaman (vide no 61).

In the 19th year of Akbar's reign, a significant event unfolded that showcased the strategic acumen and bravery of Man Singh. Following the conquest of Patna, Man Singh was honored with a Salam and naqqara and was ordered to accompany Munim Khan to Bengal. This expedition was crucial in maintaining Mughal dominance in the region, and Man Singh emerged as the soul of this campaign.

The journey to Bengal was fraught with challenges. The region was known for its rebellious factions and the powerful Afghan chief, Da'ud Khan-i-Kharani. The battle with Da'ud Khan was particularly intense. Khan Alam, a notable Mughal commander, was killed in action, and Munim Khan's horse fled the battlefield, creating a moment of potential chaos. However, Man Singh's unwavering resolve turned the tide. Holding his ground bravely, he not only prevented a defeat but also secured a resounding victory. Todar Mal, another key figure in Akbar's court, famously remarked, "What harm if Khan Alam is dead; what fear if the Khan Khanan's horse has run away, the empire is ours!" This statement underscored the resilience and determination of the Mughal forces under Man Singh's leadership.

Man Singh's successes in Bengal were numerous. After founding Akbarnagar, he continued to suppress rebellions, demonstrating his strategic brilliance and unyielding spirit. He personally marched against Isa Bhati and his Afghan forces, resulting in their retreat and the annexation of their lands. Despite falling ill, Man Singh's command did not waver. He dispatched his trusted lieutenant, Himmat Singh, to handle the renewed uprisings, and once again, his forces emerged victorious.

The relationship between Man Singh and the local rulers also played a pivotal role in his campaigns. His support for Raja Lakshmi Narayan of Cooch Behar was instrumental in securing a strategic alliance. The grateful Raja offered his sister in marriage to Man Singh and pledged his allegiance to the Mughal Emperor. This alliance not only strengthened Mughal control over Bengal but also reinforced the importance of diplomacy and marital alliances in maintaining stability.

Man Singh's tenure in Bengal was marked by continuous military engagements. His brief departure to Ajmer saw the resurgence of rebellion in Bengal. However, he swiftly returned to restore order. On February 12, 1601, near Sherpur-Atia, Man Singh defeated the rebels, chasing them for eight miles. His relentless pursuit of the rebels showcased his commitment to maintaining Mughal authority. His campaigns extended to Dacca, where he forced the submission of Kedar Rai, the zamindar of Bhushna, and defeated other notable rebels like Jalal Khan and Qazi Mumin.

In the battles that followed, Man Singh's forces triumphed over numerous adversaries, including the successor of Qatlu Khan, Usman, and the Arakan pirates. His strategic acumen and military prowess ensured the suppression of the most formidable rebels. The capture and subsequent death of Kedar Rai further demonstrated Man Singh's effectiveness as a military commander.

=== In Malwa ===
In July 1564, Todar Mal accompanied Akbar in his campaign against Abdullah Khan Uzbeg, the subahdar of Malwa Subah, who had revolted against the imperial authority. No reason for Abdullah's rebellion is furnished by the contemporary writers. Probably, having got the post of a governor, he became corrupt due to power and decided to become independent. Akbar became very much disturbed and decided to punish him. The emperor started his march on the pretext of elephant hunting on 2 July 1564. The imperial army reached the village of Liwani in Indore on 5 August and on the 6th completely defeated 'Abdullah Khan Uzbeg, who fled to Gujarat. The imperial forces returned to the capital on 9 October 1564.

According to Abu'l-Fazl, there were 300 officers with the emperor on the day of victory. He gives the names of thirty (30) officers, including that of Todar Mal. As there is no other mention of Todar Mal's activities, it can be stated that he was with Akbar in his Malwa expedition from start to finish (2 July 1564 – 9 October 1564).

== As finance minister of Akbar ==
Todar Mal succeeded Khwaja Malik I'timad Khan in 1560. Todar Mal introduced standard weights and measures, a land survey and settlement system, and revenue districts and officers. This system of maintenance by Patwari is still used in Indian Subcontinent which was improved by British Raj and Government of India.

Raja Todar Mal, as finance minister of Akbar, introduced a new system of revenue known as zabt and a system of taxation called dahsala, together forming the core of the Mughal fiscal system. His revenue collection arrangement came to be known as the "Todar Mal's Bandobast".

He took a careful survey of crop yields and prices cultivated for a 10-year period, 1570–1580. On this basis, tax was fixed on each crop in cash. Each province was divided into revenue circles with their own rates of revenue and a schedule of individual crops. This system was prevalent where the Mughal administration could survey the land and keep careful accounts. For the revenue system, Akbar's territory was divided into 15 Subahs, which were further subdivided into a total of 187 Sarkars across 15 subahs, and those 187 sarkars (sirkar) were further subdivided into a total of 3367 Mahals or Pargana. Several Mahals were grouped into Dasturs, a unit between Mahal and Sirkar. A portion of a larger Mahal or Pargana was called taraf. Mahals were subdivided into standardised Bighas. A Bigha was made of 3600 Ilahi Gaz, which is roughly half of a modern acre. The unit of measurement was standardised to Ilahi Gaz, which was equivalent to 41 fingers (29-32 inches). A lead measuring rope, called Tenab, was also standardised by joining pieces of Bamboo with iron rings so that the length of Tenab did not vary with seasonal changes.

Sometime between 1582 and 1584, as finance minister, Raja Todar Mal issued a decree which stated that all Mughal administration was to be written in Persian and in the "Iranian style". The decree also stated that the Mughal administration was to be staffed by Iranian and Hindu clerks, secretaries and scribes. His systematic approach to revenue collection became a model for the future Mughals as well as the British.

== Death ==
Todar Mal died in Lahore on 8 November 1589.

== Legacy ==
The Kashi Vishwanath Temple was rebuilt in 1585 by Todar Mal. This temple was later demolished by Aurangzeb, who had the Gyanvapi Mosque built on its ruins. The current Kashi Vishwanath Temple was built later by Ahilyabai Holkar on an adjacent plot of land.

The academic consensus holds that Persian rose to become the dominant language of the Mughal government after the 1582-1584 administrative decree was issued by Raja Todar Mal. Persian would hold such status within the Mughal bureaucracy all the way into early colonial India; eventually, in the 1830s, it would lose such status as the British made coordinated attempts to replace it with English (see also English Education Act, 1835).

== In popular culture ==
In the Indian historical television series, Bharat Ek Khoj, Todar Mal is portrayed by popular character actor Harish Patel in the two episodes (Episodes 32 and 33) about the life and times of Emperor Akbar. In the fiction television series Jodha Akbar, Todar Mal is portrayed by Shaurya Singh. In the 2008 Indian film Jodhaa Akbar, Todar Mal is portrayed by Pramod Moutho.

Todar Mal is also featured in the video games Sid Meier's Civilization IV: Beyond the Sword, Sid Meier's Civilization V: Gods and Kings, and most recently in Sid Meier's Civilization VI as a "great merchant".

== Resources ==
- "Abū al-Fażl “ʿAllāmī” ibn Mubārak, Šayḫ" and "The Ain i Akbari", vol. 1. Persian Texts in Translation, The Packard Humanities Institute.
