= Wali Beg Zulqadr =

Wali Beg Zulqadr was a faithful follower of the Mughal potentate Bairam Khan. He married Bairam Khan's sister.

Wali Beg Zulqadr was regarded by the Mughal Emperor Akbar as the chief instigator of Bairam's rebellion. He was killed in battle in Dikandar, a locality of Jalandhar in the Punjab. Akbar had his head cut off, and paraded throughout Hindustan.

His son was Hussain Quli Beg, who became known as Khan Jahan I, and became a major figure of the Mughal Empire.

The surname "Zulqadr" comes from "Du'l-qadr", a Turkic Oghuz tribe that was established mainly in southeastern Anatolia under the Seljuqs.
