= Khan Jahan I =

Mughal commander and Subahdar

Subahdar Hussain Quli Beg Khan Jahani I
- حسین قلی بیگ
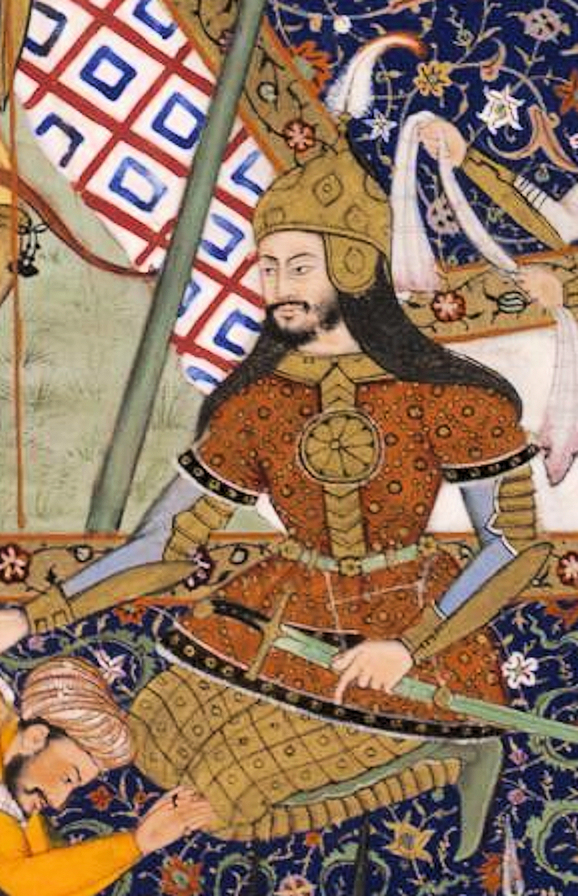
- Husayn Quli Khan (Khan Jahan), Mughal Jagir of Ajmer, in 1563

2nd Subahdar of Bengal
- In office 23 October 1575 – 19 December 1578
- Monarch: Akbar I
- Preceded by: Munim Khan
- Succeeded by: Muzaffar Khan Turbati

Personal details
- Died: 19 December 1578 Tanda, Bengal, Mughal Empire
- Parent: Wali Beg Zul-Qadr (father)
- Relatives: Bairam Khan (uncle); Raja Quli (son)
- Military career
- Branch: Mughal Army
- Service years: 1575–1578 as Subadhar
- Rank: General with the rank of 5000
- Unit: 5000 of his own sowars

Hussain Quli Beg (Persian: حسین قلی بیگ), also Husayn Quli Khan Zulqadr, was a Mughal military vassal (mansabdar) with the rank of 5000 soldiers. He was later given the title Khān-i-Jahān (Persian: خان جهان; lit. 'Khan of the World') by Emperor Akbar.

== Early life ==
Hussain Quli Beg was of Shia Persian Qizilbash origin, a member of a Turkic tribe long settled in Persia. He was the son of Wali Beg Zulqadr with the sister of Bairam Khan, of Qara Qoyunlu Turkoman ethnicity. He began his career as an ordinary soldier in Akbar's army, but was then imprisoned for supporting his uncle Bairam's revolt against the Empire. He was later pardoned by Akbar and continued his work as a loyal soldier.

== History ==
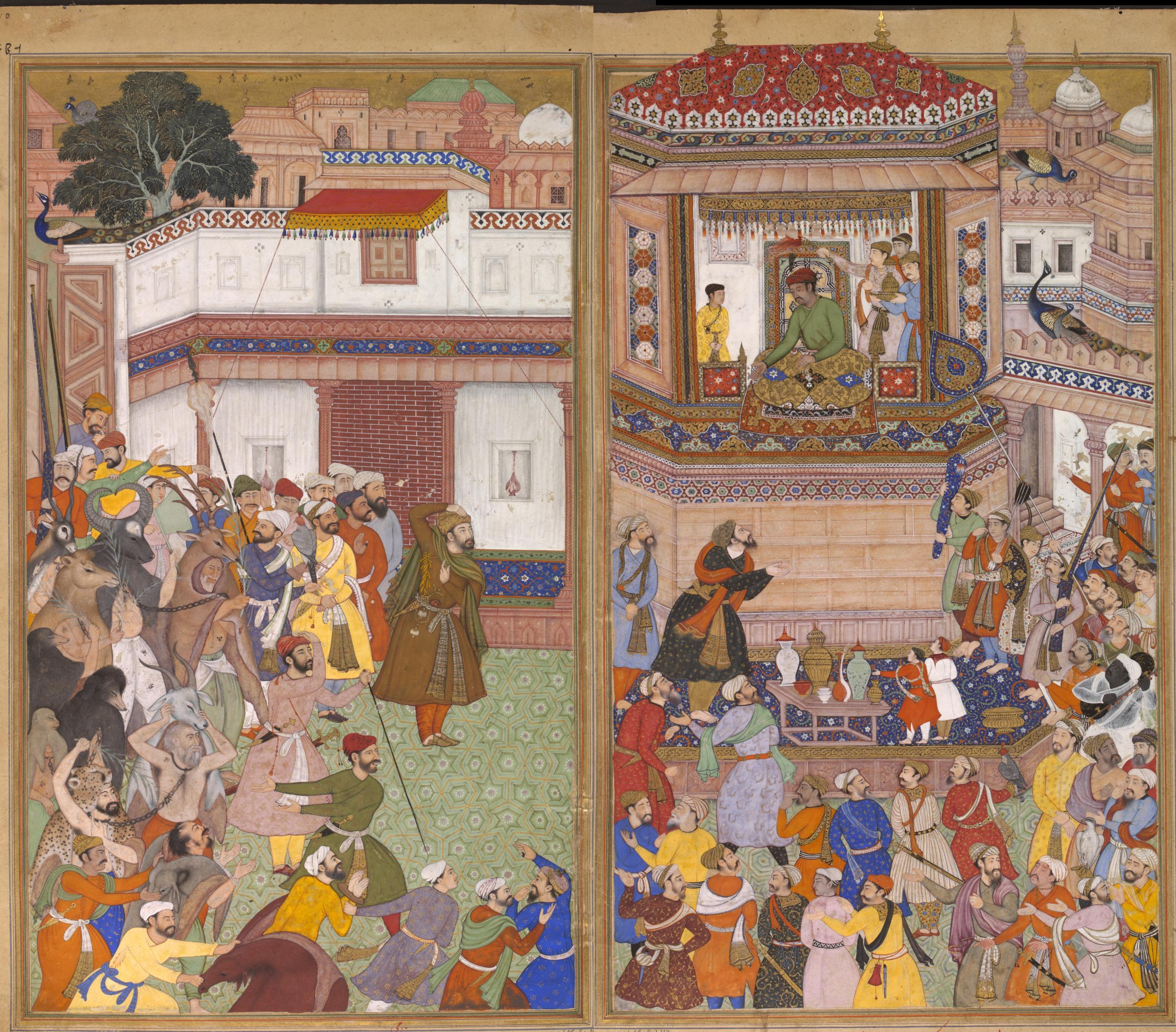
Husayn Quli Khan presents Akbar with Masud Mirza and other prisoners from Gujarat, following his victory at the Battle of Talamba (1573)

At the Battle of Talamba (1573), Husayn Quli Khan and some other officers surprise the Timurids Ibrahim Husayn Mirza and his brother Mas'ud Husayn in Tulamba near Multan. Masʿud is captured, Ibrahim escapes.

He was appointed as the Subahdar (Governor) of Bengal after the death of Munim Khan in 1575. Daud Khan Karrani, the final Afghan Sultan of Bengal, rebelled against the Mughal Empire for the second time. In November, the new governor Khan Jahan, along with Raja Todar Mal, arrived in Tanda. The following July, they faced Daud's forces near the Padma River in Bengal. On 12 July 1576, the Battle of Rajmahal commenced where the Afghans suffered a significant defeat. Their best commander was killed, and Daud was captured after his horse got stuck in the mud. The Mughals, determined to eliminate Daud, had him beheaded. Khan Jahan displayed Daud's body in Tanda and sent his head to Emperor Akbar in Agra as a trophy. Khan Jahan also took Satgaon under his control.

Khan Jahan led military expedition against the Baro-Bhuiyans in 1578. In a naval battle in Katsul against Isa Khan, the ruler of Bhati, he failed to capture the area and retreated. He later died in Tanda, the erstwhile capital of Bengal, in December 1578. He was succeeded by Muzaffar Khan Turbati as the viceroy of Bengal in April, 1579. His son, Raja Quli, was promoted to a commander of 500 infantry with 300 cavalry in 1602.

Preceded by Munim Khan	Subahdar of Bengal; 1575–1578	Succeeded by Muzaffar Khan Turbati

== Bibliography ==
- Ansari, N.H. (1989). "BAYRAM KHAN". Encyclopaedia Iranica, Vol. IV, Fasc. 1. pp. 3–5.
- Sarkar, Jadunath, ed. (1943). The History of Bengal. Vol. II: Muslim Period. Delhi: B.R. Publishing Corporation.
- Schimmel, Annemarie (1980). Islam in the Indian Subcontinent. BRILL. ISBN 978-9004061170.
