= Todarnanda =

The Todarnanda is a Sanskrit encyclopedic work of civil and religious law, astronomy, medicine and philosophy. The work was compiled from 1572-1589 under the patronage of Raja Todar Mal, a Tandon Khatri who was the Finance Minister of the Mughal Empire under the reign of Emperor Akbar. The work is made up of 80,000 verses and is equivalent to the Mahabharata in size.
