= Mukunda Deva =

Chalukya king (r. 1559-1568 CE) from Odisha, India

Mukunda Deva Harichandana
- Gajapati Maharaja Mukunda Deva
- Reign: 1559 A.D - 1568 A.D
- Coronation: Cuttack
- Predecessor: Raghuram Raya Chotaraya (Bhoi dynasty)
- Successor: Ramachandra Deva I (Bhoi dynasty)
- Died: Gohiratikiri, near Jajpur (present day Bhadrak district)
- House: Eastern Chalukya
- Religion: Hinduism

Mukunda Deva or Mukunda Harichandana (1559-1568 A.D) was the founder of "Chalukya dynasty" in ancient Orissa (now Odisha). He traced his descent from the Eastern Chalukyas of Vengi. Traditions of Odisha refer to him as “Telinga Mukandadeva”. He was the sole monarch of his dynasty and the last independent ruler of Odisha before it lost its unitary realm and independence in 1568 CE. He came to the throne at Kataka in 1559 after killing Raghuram Raya Chotaraya, the last Bhoi ruler. During his reign he tried to revive the power of Orissa. As per the Bhimeswara temple inscription of Mukunda Deva his father’s name was Saravaraju while his grandfather is mentioned as Singaraju.

== Activities ==
He set up two streets from Lion's gateway to the Gundicha Temple and laid a smooth road by covering up the pits and holes on the way. He erected a cradle arch (Dola Mandap) on the outer part of the southern walls for the Lords to swing on the Dola Festival during the last five days of falguna. Bada Jagamohan (the great front hall) of the shrine.

Mukunda Deva built a chain of forts at Raibania (in the present Balasore district) of Odisha. The fort was stormed by Kalapahad in 1558 A.D.

== Battles ==
Mukunda Deva came into close contact with the Sultan of Bengal as a foe, and Mughal emperor Akbar as an ally. He had to face the Sultan twice in the battle. In 1560, Sultan Ghiyasuddin Jalal Shah of Bengal invaded Orissa and marched up to Jajpur. Mukunda Deva defeated him and drove him out of Orissa. In 1567, while Akbar was busy in the invasion of Chittorgarh, Sultan Karrani invaded Orissa. He was defeated by the Sultan and took shelter in the fort of Kotsima. The army of Bengal attacked Cuttack, the capital of ancient Orissa. Kalapahada, the general of the Sultan, made a devastating attack on Cuttack. In the absence of Mukunda Deva, Ramachandra Bhanja (a feudatory of Sarangagarh) declared himself king of Orissa. On receiving the news, Mukunda Deva hurried to Cuttack and faced Ramachandra Bhanja on the battlefield of Gohiratikiri, near Jajpur, where he was killed. Ramachandra Bhanja was later executed by the Sultan’s forces. In the aftermath of these events, Ramachandra Deva I (son of Danai Vidyadhara) of the Bhoi dynasty formed an alliance with Akbar for avoiding an Afghan invasion and continued as a subordinate king of Odisha.
