= Kaliasole (community development block) =

Kaliasole "कलियासोल" Keliasole
- Community development block
- Location in Jharkhand, India Kaliasole (India)
- Coordinates: 23.7413°N 86.6554°E
- Country: India
- State: Jharkhand
- District: Dhanbad
- CD Block: Kaliasole

Area
  - Total: 153.23 km^{2} (59.16 sq mi)
- Elevation: 150 m (490 ft)

Population
  - Total: 97,945
  - Density: 639.20/km^{2} (1,655.5/sq mi)

Languages
  - Official: Bengali, Hindi, Khortha
- Time zone: UTC+5:30 (IST)
- PIN: 828205 (Nirsa Chatti)
- Telephone/STD code: 06540
- Vehicle registration: JH 10
- Lok Sabha constituency: Dhanbad
- Vidhan Sabha constituency: Nirsa
- Website: dhanbad.nic.in

Kaliasole is a community development block that forms an administrative division in Dhanbad Sadar subdivision of Dhanbad district, Jharkhand state, India. There are twenty (20) panchayats under Kaliasole CD Block.

== Overview ==
Dhanbad district forms a part of the Chota Nagpur Plateau, but it is more of an upland than a plateau. The district has two broad physical divisions – the southern part is a coal mining area with mining and industrial towns, and the northern part has villages scattered around hills. The landscape of the southern part is undulating and monotonous, with some scars of subsidence caused by underground mining. One of the many spurs of Parashnath Hills (1,365.50 m), located in neighbouring Giridih district, passes through the Topchanchi and Tundi areas of the district. The spur attains a height of 457.29 m but there is no peak as such. The Dhangi Hills (highest peak 385.57 m) run from Pradhan Khunta to Gobindpur. While the main river Damodar flows along the southern boundary, its tributary, the Barakar, flows along the northern boundary. DVC has built two dams across the rivers. The Panchet Dam is across the Damodar and the Maithon Dam is across the Barakar.

== Geography ==
Kaliasole is located at 23.7413°N 86.6554°E. Kaliasole CD Block is bounded by Nirsa CD Block. There are twenty (20) panchayats under Kaliasole CD Block.

Panchayat Under Kaliasole CD Block
| Serial number | Panchayats |
|---|---|
| 1 | Bada Ambana |
| 2 | Jamkudar |
| 3 | Elakand |
| 4 | Salukchapra |
| 5 | Ankduara |
| 6 | Susunliya |
| 7 | Asanliya |
| 8 | Pindrahat |
| 9 | Kaliasole |
| 10 | Dumuria |
| 11 | Dhobari |
| 12 | Urma |
| 13 | Patharkua |
| 14 | Bhurkundabadi |
| 15 | Ledaharia |
| 16 | Banagoria |
| 17 | Jamdehi |
| 18 | Patlabari |
| 19 | Banda Paschim |
| 20 | Banda Purb |
