= Lakshipur =

- city
- Location in Jharkhand, India Lakshipur (India)
- Coordinates: 23.476401°N 86.358962°E
- Country: India
- State: Jharkhand
- District: Bokaro

Government
  - Body: Lakhipur Village
- Elevation: 22 m (72 ft)

Population (2001)
  - Total: 10,000

Languages
  - Official: Bengali, Urdu
- Time zone: UTC+5:30 (IST)
- PIN: 828134
- Telephone code: 06542
- ISO 3166 code: IN-AS
- Vehicle registration: JH 09

Lakshipur is a village in Jharkhand, India.
