= Battle of Tukaroi =

1575 battle in eastern India

Coordinates: 21.973°N 87.284°E

- Part of Mughal invasion of Bengal
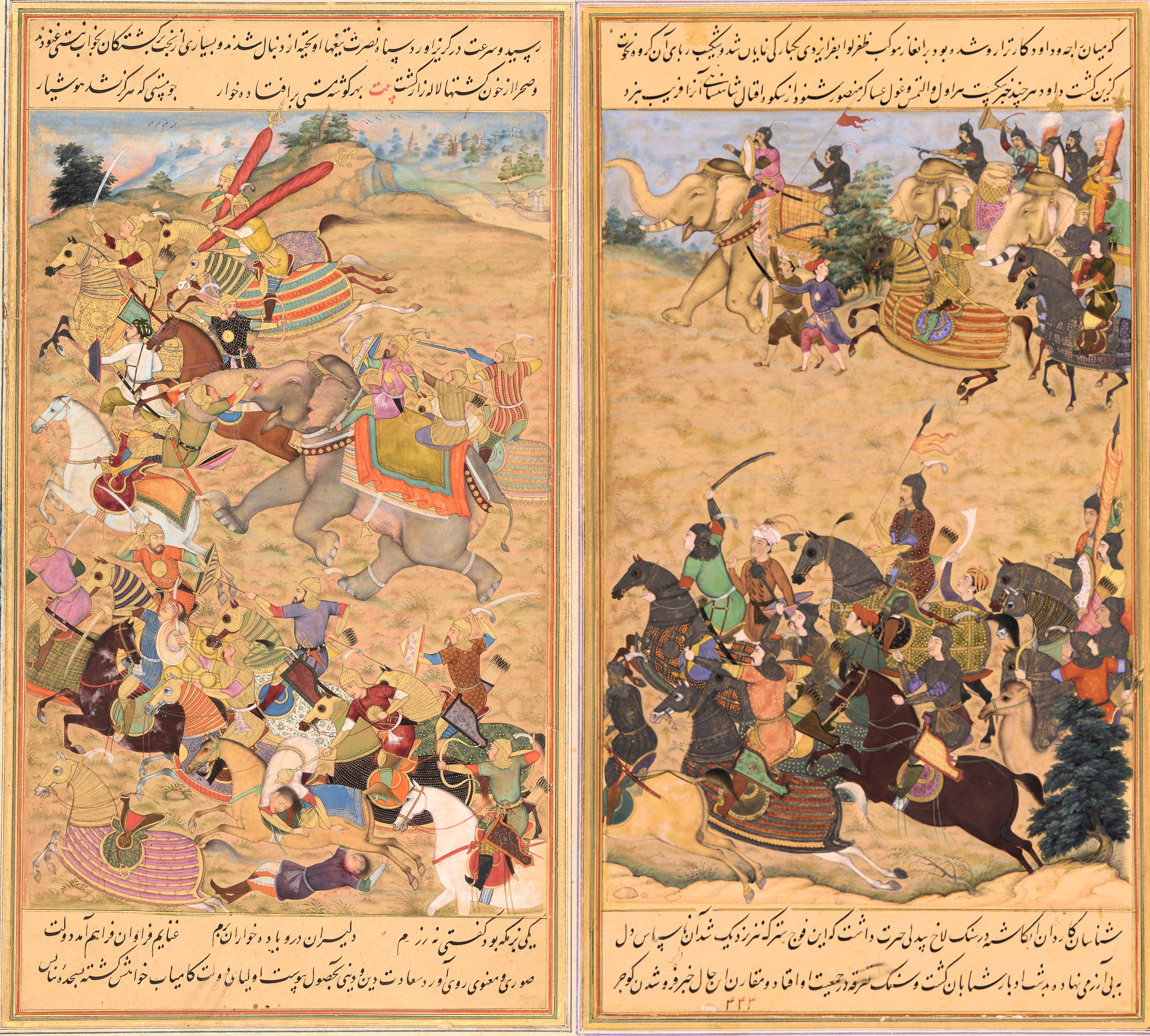
- Battle of Tukaroi c. 1590
Date	3 March 1575
Location	Between Midnapore and Jaleswar
Result	Mughal victory: Treaty of Katak

Belligerents
Mughal Empire	Bengal Sultanate

Commanders and leaders
Akbar I Munim Khan (WIA); Daud Khan; Raja Todar Mal	Daud Khan Karrani; Gujar Khan †; Junaid Khan Karrani

Strength
200,000 troops consisting of 150,000 infantry 30,000 cavalry 20,000 musketeers	140,000 infantry 40,000 cavalry 20,000 guns 3,600 elephants Several hundred war-boats

Casualties and losses
70,000 casualties	110,000 casualties 30,000 infantry and 250 cavalry fled All elephants killed or captured Rest of the army captured, of which 30% executed

The Battle of Tukaroi, also known as the Battle of Bajhaura or the Battle of Mughulmari, was fought between the Mughal Empire and the Bengal Sultanate on 3 March 1575 near the village of Tukaroi in present-day Balasore District of Odisha. It resulted in a Mughal victory and greatly weakened the Bengal Sultanate.

== Background ==
Muhammad Bakhtiyar Khalji of the Ghurid Sultanate, defeated the Sena king Lakshman Sen at his capital, Nabadwip in 1203–04 and conquered most of Bengal. The Deva family – the last Hindu dynasty to rule in Bengal – ruled briefly in East Bengal, although they were suppressed by the mid-fourteenth century.

During the early Muslim period, the former Sena Hindu kingdom became known as the Sultanate of Bangala and Bihar, ruled intermittently from the Sultanate of Delhi. The chaotic shifts in power between the Afghan and Turkish rulers of that sultanate came to an end when Mughal rule became established in Bengal during the sixteenth century.

During the reign of Mughal Emperor Jalal ud-Din Muhammad Akbar, the Sultan of Bangala was Daud Khan Karrani, who had seized Fort Zamania, a frontier post of the Mughal Empire. This gave Akbar the cause for war.

Akbar, who was in Gujarat when he received the news of Daud's audacity, at once dispatched orders to Munim Khan and the representative of the imperial power in Jaunpur to chastise the aggressor. Munim on receipt of his sovereign's instructions assembled a powerful force and marched on Patna where he was opposed by Lodi Khan, an influential Afghan chief who had placed Daud on the throne and now served that prince as minister. Munim Khan, who was by then very old, had lost his energy and after some skirmishing was content to cease hostilities and grant Daud extremely lenient terms. Neither of the principal parties was pleased and Emperor Akbar thought that Munim Khan had been too easy going whereas Daud was jealous of his minister Lodi Khan. The emperor accordingly deputed Raja Todar Mal to take the command in Bihar making over the Raja's civil duties as Diwan temporarily to Rai Ram Das. Daud treacherously killed his minister Lodi Khan and confiscated his property. Munim Khan, stung by his master's censure, returned rapidly to Patna and laid siege to the city. But he soon found the task of taking it to be beyond his powers and begged Emperor Akbar to come in person and assume charge of the campaign. Akbar, who had just returned to the capital after paying his annual visit to Ajmer proceeded to Agra in March 1574 and prepared a fleet of elaborately equipped boats to proceed down the rivers.

On 15 June 1574, Akbar embarked for the river voyage and was accompanied by many of his best officers, both Hindu and Muslim. The names of nineteen given by Abu'l-Fazl ibn Mubarak include Bhagwan Das, Raja Man Singh, Raja Birbal, Shahbaz Khan and Kasim Khan, the admiral or Mir Bahr. The voyage was hindered by the rainy season, which was then at its height. Several vessels foundered off Etawah and 11 off Allahabad.

After travelling for 26 days, Akbar reached Benares where he halted for three days. He then proceeded and anchored near where the Gomti River joins the Ganga River. On the same day the army which had marched by land arrived. The whole movement evidently had been thought out and executed with consummate skill in the face of tremendous difficulties due to the weather. The ladies and children were sent to Jaunpur and Akbar in response to urgent entreaties from Munim Khan that he would be pleased to come in person with all speed to the front, advanced to the famous ferry at Chaunsa where his father, Emperor Humayun, had suffered a severe defeat in 1539. The army was then brought across to the southern bank of the river.

== Siege of Patna ==
Patna had been under siege for several months now under Munim Khan. Akbar continued his journey by water and on 3 August 1574 landed in the neighbourhood of Patna. After taking counsel with his officers and ascertaining that the besieged city relied for the greater part of its supplies on the town of Hajipur situated on the opposite or northern bank of the Ganges he decided that the capture of that place was a necessary preliminary to the successful accomplishment of the main design. The difficulties caused by the flooded state of the huge river many miles in width at that season and the strenuous resistance of a strongly posted garrison were overcome and the fort was captured by the gallantry of the detachment appointed by Akbar to the duty. The heads of the Afghan leaders killed were thrown into a boat and brought to Akbar who forwarded them to Daud as a hint of the fate which awaited and in due course befell him.

The same day Akbar ascended the Panj Pahari or Five Hills a group of extremely ancient artificial mounds standing about half a mile to the south of the city and thence reconnoitred the position. Daud, although he still had at his disposal 20,000 horses, a large park of artillery and many elephants, came to the conclusion that he could not resist the imperial power and decided on flight. During the night he slipped out quietly by a back gate and went to Bengal. The garrison which attempted to escape in the darkness suffered heavy losses in the process. Akbar was eager to start at once but was persuaded to wait until the morning when he entered Patna by the Delhi gate. He then personally pursued the fugitives for about 50 miles but failed to overtake them.

265 elephants were taken, and the common people picked up purses of gold and articles of armor in the streams and on the banks. The capture of a city in the middle of the rainy season was an almost unprecedented achievement and came as a painful surprise to the Bengal Sultan. He had reckoned on Akbar following the Indian custom of waiting until the Dasahara festival in October to begin a campaign. But Akbar disregarded adverse weather conditions and so was able to win victories in defiance of the shastras and the seasons.

== Akbar's return to Fatehpur Sikri ==
The question now came up for decision whether the campaign should be prosecuted notwithstanding the rains or postponed until the cold season. Opinions were divided but Akbar had no hesitation in deciding that delay could not be permitted. Accordingly, he organised an additional army of more than 20,000 men entrusting the supreme command to old Munim Khan who was appointed governor of Bengal. Raja Todar Mal and other capable officers were placed under his orders. Jaunpur, Benares, Chunar and certain other territories were brought under the direct administration of the Crown and officers were appointed to govern them on behalf of Akbar. He resolved to return to his capital leaving the Bengal campaign to be conducted by his generals. Late in September while he was encamped at Khanpur in the Jaunpur district he received dispatches announcing the success of Munim Khan. The emperor arrived at Fatehpur Sikri on 18 January 1575 after seven months of strenuous travelling and campaigning.

== Battle ==
The Mughal army marched into the Bengal capital, Tanda (near Gaur), and Daud withdrew to Odisha. He had gathered a host. The action was forced on Munim Khan who was compelled to engage before he was ready when the forces of the Bengal sultanate unexpectedly went on the offensive at dawn.

In the early stages of the field battle the Mughal commander received several severe wounds and was knocked out. Victory seemed assured for the Bengal sultanate's army. But Akbar now commanded a flanking attack later in the day. The cavalry on both sides fought valiantly, but the attack from the Mughal cavalry decimated the Bengal sultanate cavalry, which fell back.

Eventually the untimely death of Daud's general, Gujar Khan, in the melee caused the tide to turn and brought about the total defeat of Sultan Daud who fled from the field along with 30,000 of his troops.

According to the book Banglar Itihash (Sultani Amol) by Dr. Abdul Karim', Tukaroi is a village in present-day Medinipur district of West Bengal: Mughulmari is also a village, Mughulmari is eight miles north of Tukaraoi. The West Bengal-Orissa trunk road and the Howrah-Nagpur railway pass one mile west of Tukaroi. Some say that this battle spread eight miles from Tukaroi to Mughalmari and the Mughals suffered heavy losses in this battle, hence the name Mughalmari. The Battle of Tukaroi is very important in the history of Bengal, because it was in this battle that the Afghans lost their sovereignty and the independence of Bengal was lost.

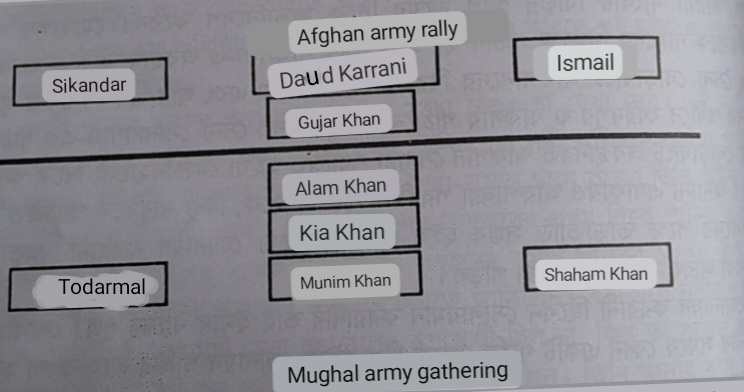
Mughal & Afghan battle formation in the battle of Tukaroi,1575! [Source: Banglar Itihash (Sultani Amol) by Dr. Abdul Karim

Above is a picture of the gathering of troops of both sides at the Battle of Tukaroi. There was an additional division in the Mughal army, called the Altamash, which was between the vanguard and the rearguard. Both armies prepared for battle, but Munim Khan had no desire to fight that day because according to astrologers the day was not auspicious for the Mughals. But when the Afghan forces advanced, Alam Khan, the leader of the Mughal advance force, launched an attack. Until then the Mughal army was not fully prepared. Munim Khan ordered Alam Khan to come back. Thus the untimely invasion of Alam Khan and the return of Alam Khan on the orders of Munim Khan caused disarray in the Mughal advance. The elephants of the Afghans continued to advance; the Mughals could not subdue the elephants even with cannon fire. As a result, the Mughal advance party dispersed and put pressure on the Mughal Altamsh forces under Kia Khan. The Afghan general, Gujar Khan, threw all his might into the Mughals, resulting in disarray among the Mughal advance forces, the Altamash forces, and the central forces. Munim Khan sheathed his sword with a cane in his hand and tried to prevent the escape of his soldiers. But the disarray among the Mughal army grew to such an extent that Gujar Khan came directly to Munim Khan's sea and engaged in battle with Munim Khan. The old man Munim Khan began to resist the attack of Gujar Khan; he tried to block the blow of Gujar Khan's sword with his cane, but was injured as a result. Soon Munim Khan died, but fortunately some loyal Mughal soldiers went there and took the reins of Munim Khan's horse and drove him to the other side. By this time there was a war between the Afghans and the front and center of the Mughals, and the Afghans were able to disperse the Mughals. The tents and tented treasures of the Mughal commander Munim Khan lay exposed and unprotected before the Afghans. The Afghans, naturally greedy, could not contain their greed for Mughal wealth now. Even before the battle was won, they started looting the Mughal tents and as a result there was disorder among the Afghan soldiers. Mughal commanders took full advantage of this. Kia Khan and other generals regrouped their troops and attacked the disorganized Afghans. The Afghans had moved so far from their main force that no one could advance to their aid. Suddenly a gunshot came and struck Gujar Khan, resulting in his death. After the death of the commander, the Afghans scattered and fled wherever they could.

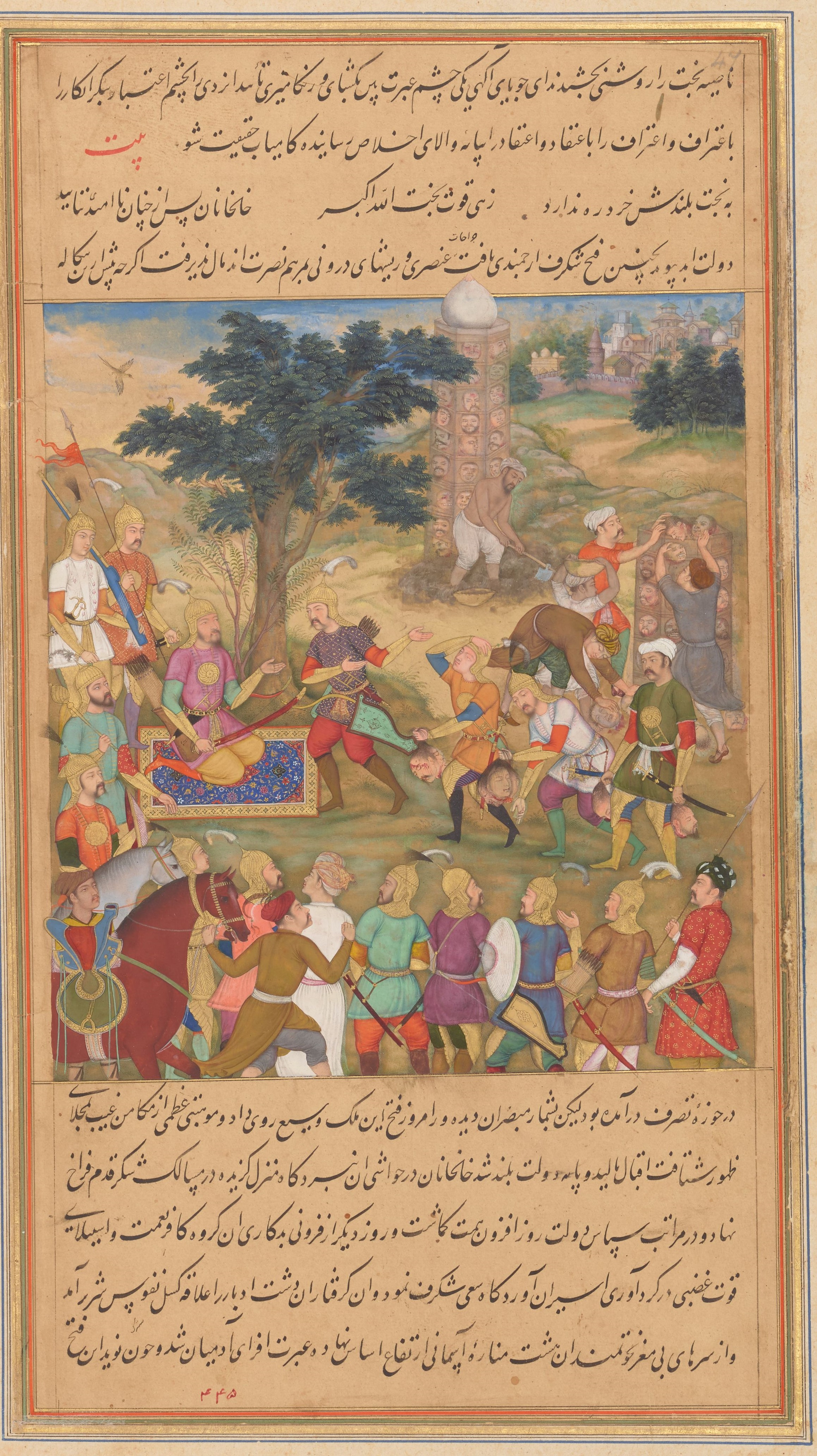
Skull minaret made by Munʿim Khan, after the Battle of Tukaroi (1575).

Until now, other groups of the Afghan forces had played the role of silent spectators. Immediately before the death of Gujar Khan, the Afghans on the right under Sikandar attacked the enemy, but soon after hearing the news of Gujar Khan's death, they became disheartened and fled. Now Todarmal faced Daud and Shaham Khan faced Ismail and fought fiercely. The news of Munim Khan's escape first reached Shaham Khan. Feeling despondent, he considered fleeing, but his colleagues encouraged him, and Shaham Khan continued to conduct the war with full vigor. When Todarmal received the news of Munim Khan's escape, he remained undisturbed and motivated his army to fight with all their might, saying:

The breeze of victory is about to blow and the light of success is emerging from the horizon of hope.

These two generals, Todarmal and Shaham Khan, continued to confront the enemy with immense valour. Soon Shaham Khan was able to disperse the Afghan forces under Ismail and marched to the aid of Todarmal. Daud Karrani could not stand long in front of their combined attack. Daud fled to Cuttack, and many Afghans were captured by the Mughals. The captives were killed, and eight towers were constructed from their remains.

On reaching Cuttack, Daud first intended to wage war, but later became disappointed and offered a treaty to Munim Khan. The war-weary Munim Khan also agreed to a treaty and Munim Khan signed the treaty with Daud despite Todarmal's prohibition. In this treaty, Daud submitted to Akbar and was entrusted with ruling Orissa as a Mughal vassal. This agreement is known as the Cuttack agreement.

== Treaty of Katak and aftermath ==
The battle led to the Treaty of Katak in which Daud ceded the whole of Bengal and Bihar, retaining only Odisha. The treaty eventually failed after the death of Munim Khan who died at the age of 50. Sultan Daud Khan took the opportunity and invaded Bengal. This would lead to the Battle of Raj Mahal in 1576.
