= Sulaiman Khan Karrani =

Sultan of Bengal from 1565 to 1572

Sulaiman Karrani

27th Sultan of Bengal
- Reign: 1565–11 October 1572
- Coronation: 1565
- Predecessor: Taj Khan Karrani
- Successor: Bayazid Khan Karrani
- Wazir: Ludi Khan
- Died: 11 October 1572; Tanda, Bengal Sultanate
- Burial: October 1572; Tanda, Bengal Sultanate
- Issue: Bayazid Khan Karrani, Daud and one daughter
Names
- Sulaiman Khan Karrani
- House: Karrani
- Religion: Sunni Islam
- Military career
- Conflicts: Bengal Sultanate conquest of Orissa (1568); War with Kuch Kingdom (1568)

Sulaiman Khan Karrani (Bengali: সুলায়মান খান কররানী, Persian: سليمان خان کرانی; reigned: 1565–1572) was an Afghan Sultan of Bengal. He ascended to the throne after the death of his brother Taj Khan Karrani. According to the Riyaz-us-Salatin, he shifted the seat of government from Gaur to Tanda. His kingdom stretched from frontier of Koch Kingdom to Puri in Odisha and from the Brahmaputra to Son River bordering the Mughal Empire.

Sulaiman, his brother Taj and Sulaiman's sons Bayazid and Daud Khan Karrani ran a short-lived Afghan vassal state of Mughal emperor Akbar in Bengal. They dominated the area while Sulaiman paid homage to the Akbar. The Afghans defeated by Akbar began to flock under his flag. The Afghans were not technically the rulers of Bengal, the post was primarily nominal.

== Relation with Akbar ==
Sulaiman Khan Karrani did not establish his own coinage during his reign, an act that would have been tantamount to declaring statehood to the ruling Mughals. He also honoured Akbar as the supreme ruler of Bengal by requiring that mosques read Akbar's name in the Khutbah, the sermon at the Friday congregational prayers in Bengal. Historians cite these acts as keeping the diplomatic peace between Bengal and Mughal Empire during Akbar's lifetime. This success was possible due to his wazir, Ludi Khan.

== Reign ==
=== Conquest of Odisha ===
Northern India and parts of southern India were ruled by the Muslim rulers before they conquered Odisha. In 1568 Sulaiman Khan sent his son Bayazid Khan Karrani and the general Kalapahad (Kala Pahar) against Mukunda Deva, the king of Utkal Odisha. After a few major battles against the Odias, and aided by civil war elsewhere in Odisha, Sulaiman was able to bring the entire area under his rule. Kalapahad took Puri under control and the Jagannath temple without any resistance. The inhabitants of Puri disbelieved saying,

What sort of strange creatures are these Musalman pecple? And can they have the power to harm this god ?

A large number of people took shelter. Kalapahad seized the temple and dismantled the temple of Jaganath. Sulaiman Karrani appointed Ismail Khan Lodhi as Governor of Odisha and Qutlu Khan Lohani as Governor of Puri respectively.

=== War with Kuch Kingdom ===
The Kuch kingdom bordered with Bengal Sultanate on the south and Ahom Kingdom on the east. In 1568, the Kuch king Nara Narayan (r. 1554–1587), invaded the dominions of Sulaiman Shah. His general prince Shukladhwaja surnamed Chila Rai was defeated and captured by the Afghans. The Bengal army penetrated as far as Tezpur, destroying temples at Kamakhya, Hajo and others. Sulaiman laid siege on Kuch capital but withdrew upon hearing invasion from Odisha. Chila Rai was set free after few years of captivity.

== Religion ==
Sulaiman was a devout Muslim and built the Sona mosque in old Maldah. 'Abd al-Qadir Bada'uni said that every morning Sulaiman held a devotional meeting with 150 Shaikhs and Ulama before transacting any state business. He patronised Muslim scholars, implemented Quranic law of conduct and upheld justice.

== Death and succession ==
Sulaiman Karrani died on 11 October 1572, leaving his empire to his son, Bayazid Khan Karrani. He was buried in Tanda, the capital of his Sultanate.

Preceded by Taj Khan Karrani	Karrani dynasty 1565-1572	Succeeded by Bayazid Khan Karrani

== See also ==
- List of rulers of Bengal
- History of Bengal
- History of Bangladesh
- History of India

== Bibliography ==
- Sarkar, Jadunath, ed. (2003) [First published 1943]. The History of Bengal. Vol. II: Muslim Period. Delhi: B.R. Publishing Corporation. ISBN 81-7646-239-X.
