= Bayazid Khan Karrani =

Sultan of Bengal in 1572

Bayazid Karrani

28th Sultan of Bengal
- Reign: 11 October 1572 – 1572 (few months)
- Predecessor: Sulaiman Khan Karrani
- Successor: Daud Khan Karrani
- Died: 1572; Bengal Sultanate
- House: Karrani
- Father: Sulaiman Khan Karrani
- Religion: Sunni Islam

Bayazid Khan Karrani (Bengali: বায়েজীদ খান কররানী, Persian: بايزيد خان کرانی) was the third Sultan of the Bengal Sultanate's Karrani dynasty.

== Life ==
During the reign of his father, Sulaiman Khan Karrani, he was given the command of a force on a campaign to Orissa in 1567. The campaign was successful and the king, who was an Eastern Chalukya from Andhra who had conquered Orissa in the 1550s, was defeated.also he knew Pir baizin in his life.

After his father died on 11 October 1572, he ascended the throne. Assuming power, he broke allegiance and the outward suzerainty with the Mughal Empire which his father had established, and declared independence. He had his name read during the khutbah in the Friday prayer and issued coins with his own name. These actions turned the Afghan chiefs and nobles of his father, against Bayazid - making him an unpopular ruler. Bayazid attempted to banish the Afghan nobles, eventually leading to them conspiring against him.

== Death ==
He only ruled for a few months before he was betrayed and assassinated by his cousin and sister's husband, Hansu. Hansu was later dethroned and killed by Sulaiman Khan's trusted nobles led by Wazir Ludi Khan. Bayazid's younger brother, Daud Khan Karrani, eventually took the power.

Bayazidpur, now Bajitpur, in modern-day Kishoreganj District is said to have been named after him.

Preceded by Sulaiman Khan Karrani	Karrani dynasty 1572	Succeeded by Daud Khan Karrani

== See also ==
- List of rulers of Bengal
- History of Bangladesh
- History of Bengal
