= Munim Khan =

Mughal general and official (1525–1575)

Wakīl Munʿim Khān Khān-i-Khānān
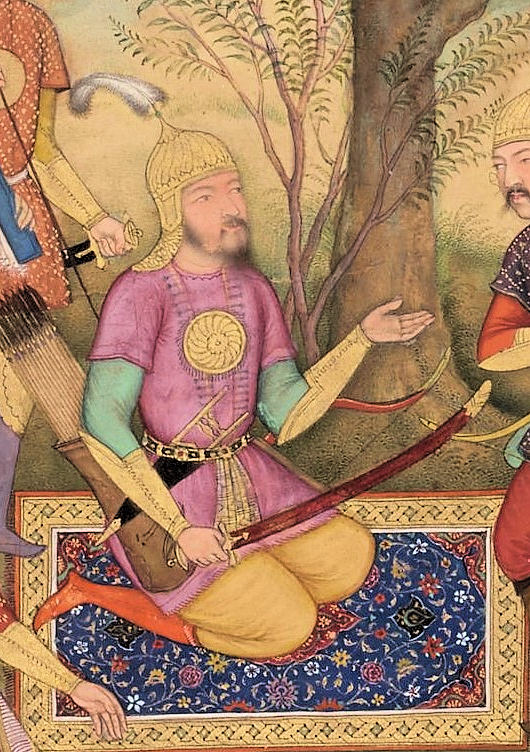
- Munʿim Khan, after the Battle of Tukaroi (1575)

Vakil of the Mughal Empire
- In office March/April 1560 – November 1561
- Preceded by: Bairam Khan
- Succeeded by: Ataga Khan

Subahdar of Jaunpur
- In office 1564–1574

1st Subahdar of Bengal
- In office 25 September 1574 – 23 October 1575
- Monarch: Akbar I
- Preceded by: Daud Khan Karrani (as Sultan of Bengal)
- Succeeded by: Khan Jahan I

Subahdar of Kabul
- In office 1556–1560
- Preceded by: Muhammad Hakim
- Succeeded by: Ghani Khan
- In office 1563 – 23 October 1575
- Preceded by: Ghani Khan
- Succeeded by: Mirza Muhammad Hakim

Personal details
- Born: 7 March 1525 Jaunpur, Delhi Sultanate
- Died: 23 October 1575 (aged 50) Tanda, Bengal Subah, Mughal Empire
- Children: Ghani Khan; Sahila Banu Begum
- Parent: Miran Beg Andijani (father)

Munʿim Khān (7 March 1525 – 23 October 1575) was a Mughal general under both emperors Humayun and Akbar. He was titled Khān-i-Khānān ('Khan of Khans') when Emperor Akbar appointed him as Prime Minister of the Mughal Empire in 1560. In 1564, he became the Subahdar of Jaunpur. Munim Khan was the first Mughal governor of Bengal Subah from 1574 to 1575 and Kabul in two separate terms from 1556 to 1560 and 1563 to 1575.

== Early life and family ==
Khan was born on 7 March 1525 in Jaunpur as a Persianised Turk whose ancestors originally hailed from the city of Andijan in present-day Uzbekistan. His father's name was Miran Beg Andijani, and his foster brother was Mirza Askari.

== Career ==
In 1560, Bairam Khan retired from his role as the Empire's Vakil (prime minister) and Mughal emperor Akbar then appointed Munim for this role. Under Akbar's orders, Munim went into war with Mah Chuchak Begum who had transgressed but was defeated by her in Jalalabad and Munim's son, Ghani Khan, was executed. After the Uzbeks of Jaunpur rebelled, Munim Khan was tasked as the Governor of Jaunpur and the eastern districts. Khan was promoted to a Mansabdar (military commander) of 5000 soldiers, which was the highest rank at the time.

=== Expeditions against Daud Khan Karrani ===
Akbar sent Khan to suppress the independent Sultan of Bengal, Daud Khan Karrani, who had refused to recognise the Mughal Empire. After initially failing, Munim Khan successfully took control of Hajipur and Patna. Khan was then appointed as the Subahdar (governor) of Bengal (which included Bihar at the time). He later captured the erstwhile capital of Bengal, Khwaspur Tandah, on 25 September 1574. During the Battle of Tukaroi, that took place on 3 March 1575, Munim Khan forced Daud Karrani to sign a treaty which left only Odisha under Daud's control. Munim Khan then transferred Bengal's capital from Tanda to Gaur.

== Personal life ==
Munim Khan had 8 concubines, and was the father of two children:

- Ghani Khan - executed in Kabul at the orders of Empress Mah Chuchak Begum.
- Sahila Banu Begum - married to Emperor Jahangir in 1607

== Death ==
Munim died on 23 October 1575 in Tanda after fleeing a plague epidemic at Gaur. After his death, Daud Karrani recaptured Gaur.

== See also ==
- List of rulers of Bengal
- History of Bengal
- History of India

Preceded by Position created	Subahdar of Bengal; 25 September 1574– 23 October 1575	Succeeded by Khan Jahan I
