= Daud Khan Karrani =

Sultan of Bengal from 1572 to 1576

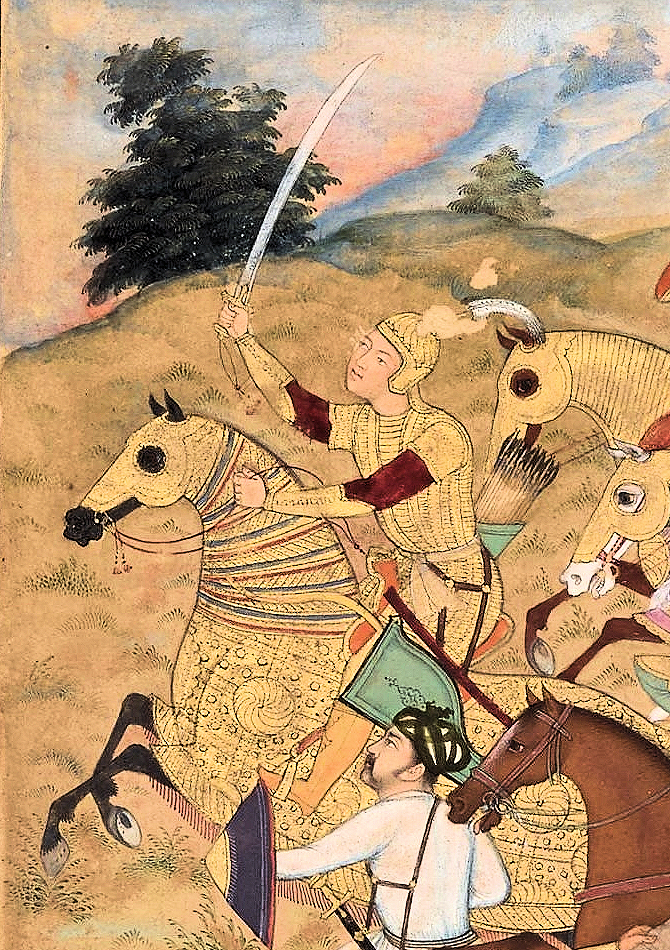
- Daud Khan Karrani at the Battle of Tukaroi (3 March 1575)

29th Sultan of Bengal
- Reign: 1573 – 12 July 1576
- Predecessor: Bayazid Khan Karrani
- Successor: Munim Khan (as Subahdar of Bengal)
- Died: 12 July 1576; Rajmahal, Bengal Sultanate
- Father: Sulaiman Khan Karrani
- Mother: Naulakha
- Religion: Sunni Islam

Daud Khan Karrani (Note: Bengali: দাউদ খান কররানী; Persian: داوود خان کرانی) (died 12 July 1576) was the last ruler of Bengal's Karrani dynasty as well as the final Sultan of Bengal, reigning from 1573 to 1576. During the reign of his father Sulaiman Khan Karrani, Daud commanded a massive army of 40,000 cavalry, 3,600 elephants, 140,000 infantry and 200 cannons.

== Reign ==
After the assassination of Bayazid Khan Karrani, Daud was raised to the throne by the nobles. Both Bayazid and Daud shook off their allegiance to Akbar and issued coins in their own names. However, Daud's hot-tempered attitude created disruption among the Karrani nobles.

=== War with Mughals ===
==== Invasion of Jamania ====
Emperor Akbar moved against Daud Khan after the latter invaded Zamania (near Ghazipur). The Bengali army razed the city to the ground and captured its fort. In response, Akbar ordered Munim Khan, the governor of Jaunpur, to proceed against Daud. However, Munim Khan met with his friend Ludi Khan, Daud's Prime Minister, in Patna and opted for a truce.

The agreement pleased neither Akbar nor Daud, and Ludi Khan was subsequently put to death by Daud.

==== Battle of Patna ====
In 1573 Munim Khan attacked Bihar, forcing Daud to retreat and take shelter in Patna. Daud sent Katlu Lohani, Gujar Khan Karrani and Sri Hari against the Mughal army. Munim Khan, along with Todar Mal and Man Singh, made the first attack in Hajipur. After a fierce battle, the Bengalis and Afghans were at the verge of victory. However, Akbar then re-captured the neighboring fort of Hajipur, which was the source of rations for the army of his opponent. The Bengalis along with the Afghans fell in distress and retreated to Bengal. Akbar returned to the capital after appointing Munim Khan as the governor of Bihar and Bengal. Todar Mal was also left to assist him.

==== Battle of Tukaroi ====
On 3 March 1575 a fierce battle was fought between the Mughals and the Afghans in Tukaroi. The result was a draw and the Afghans retreated to Katak, Orissa. The Mughals captured Tanda. Bengal. Munim Khan transferred the capital of Bengal from Tanda to Gaur. In the treaty of Katak, Daud ceded Bengal and Bihar to the Mughals. But he retained only Orissa as his possession. Six months later a plague broke out, and Munim Khan suddenly died in October 1575. The Mughal army was forced to retreat from Eastern Bengal by Kalapahar and Isa Khan. Daud marched from Orissa to successfully recaptured Gaur.

==== Battle of Rajmahal ====
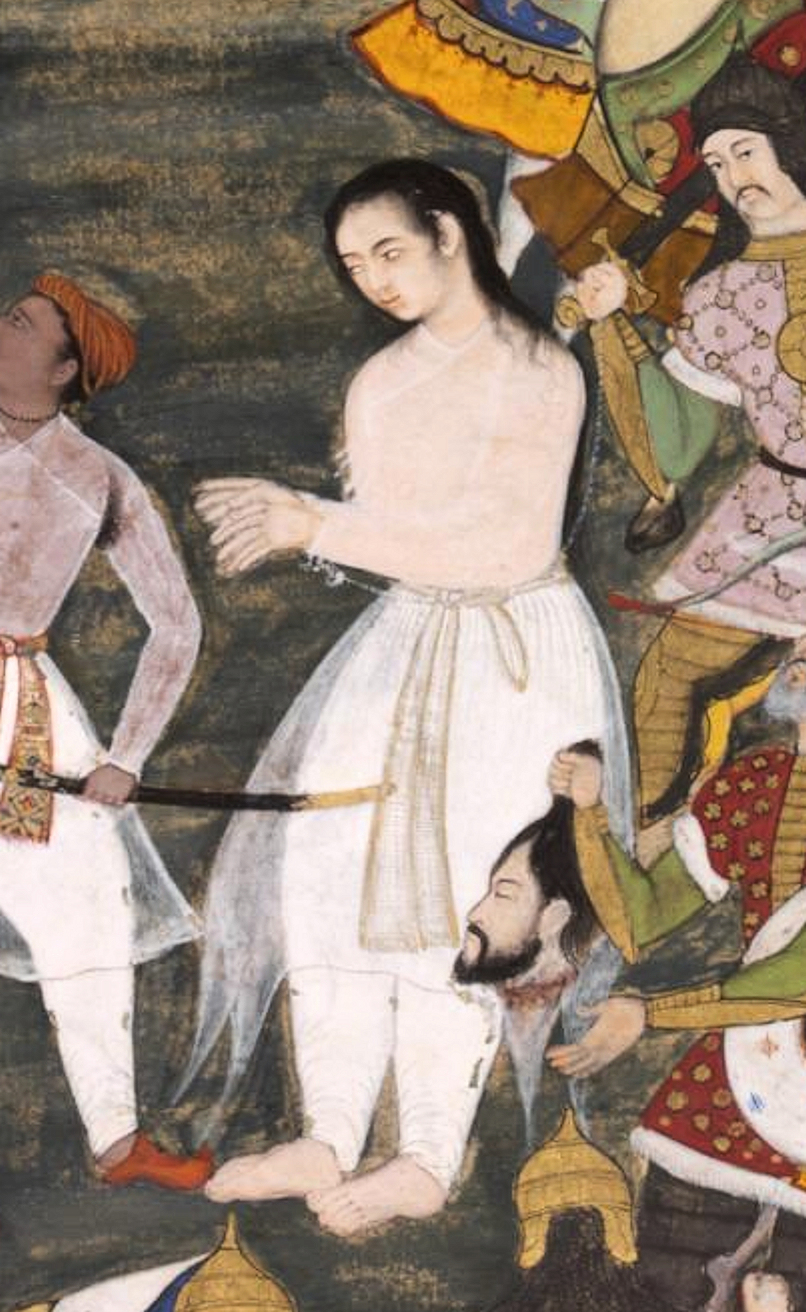
Sultan Daud, captured at the Battle of Rajmahal (1576).

Akbar sent a new army under the command of Khan Jahan Quli to face his formidable foe Daud Khan. He captured Teliagarhi and advanced towards Rajmahal. The two armies met in the battlefield of Rajmahal. The battle went on for many days. As the fight was getting too difficult for Akbar, he requested the governor of Bihar, Muzaffar Khan Turbati and other generals to join him. On the other side Daud was accompanied by other principal Afghan leaders like Junaid, Qutlu Khan and Ismail Khan Lodhi. After a fierce battle on 12 July 1576, Daud was finally defeated and executed.
