= Sakina Banu Begum =

- Shahzadi of Mughal Empire
- Died: 25 August 1604; Akbarabad (present day Agra), Mughal Empire
- Spouse: Shah Ghazi Khan
- House: Timurid
- Father: Humayun
- Mother: Mah Chuchak Begum
- Religion: Sunni Islam

Sakina Banu Begum (died 25 August 1604) was a Mughal princess and a daughter of Mughal emperor Humayun.

== Life ==
Sakina Banu Begum was the daughter of Emperor Humayun, and his wife Mah Chuchak Begum. Her siblings included, Mirza Muhammad Hakim, Farrukh Fal Mirza, Bakht-un-Nissa Begum, and Amina Banu Begum.

Sakina Banu Begum was married to Shah Ghazi Khan, the cousin of Naqib Khan Qazvini, a personal friend of Akbar. His uncle Qazi Isa had long served as the Qadi of Iran, came to India and was taken into government service. In 1573, after his death, Naqib Khan reported to Akbar that he had left his daughter to him. Akbar went to Naqib's house and married her. Thus, two of his cousins were married into the imperial family.

In 1578, Sakina Banu Begum was sent to Kabul, before Akbar's second march on the city. Her brother at that point seemed to have conducted negotiations with the Abdulkhairi Uzbek of the Marwa-un-nahr and with the Safavids, who treated him as a sovereign ruler as well as another Timurid potentate, Prince Sulaiman Mirza. She was sent to pacify the Mirza and was advised to offer Prince Salim Mirza (future Emperor Jahangir) in marriage to his daughter as an incentive.

Sakina Banu Begum died on 25 August 1604.
