= Humayun =

Mughal emperor from 1530 to 1540 and from 1555 to 1556

Humayun همایون
- Padishah; Al-Sultan Al-Azam
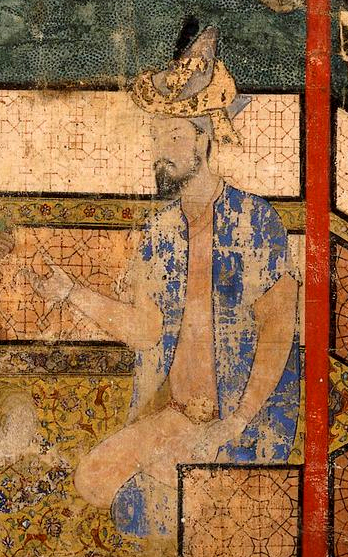
- Portrait from life painted in Kabul, attributed to Abd al-Samad, c. 1550–55, Humayun is seated, wearing the Tāj-i 'Izzat

Mughal emperor
- First reign: 26 December 1530 – 17 May 1540
- Coronation: 29 December 1530; Agra Fort
- Predecessor: Babur
- Successor: Sher Shah Suri (as Sur Emperor)
- Heir-apparent: Al-aman Mirza
- Second reign: 22 June 1555 – 27 January 1556
- Predecessor: Adil Shah Suri (as Sur Emperor)
- Successor: Akbar I
- Born: Nasir al-Din Muhammad; 6 March 1508; Kabul, Kabulistan (present-day Afghanistan)
- Died: 27 January 1556 (aged 47); Sher Mandal, Delhi, Mughal Empire (present-day India)
- Burial: Humayun's Tomb, Delhi, India
- Consort: List: Bega Begum; Gulbarg Begum; Mewa Jan; Hamida Banu Begum; Mah Chuchak Begum; Khanish Aghacha; Agha Jan; Chand Bibi; Shad Bibi; Gunwar Bibi
- Issue: Al-aman Mirza; Akbar; Farrukh-Fal Mirza; Mirza Muhammad Hakim; Ibrahim Sultan Mirza; Aqiqa Sultan Begum; Bakshi Banu Begum; Jahan Sultan Begum; Bakht-un-Nissa Begum; Sakina Banu Begum; Amina Banu Begum
Names
- Mirza Nasir-ud-Din Muhammad Humayun
Regnal name
- Al‑Sulṭān al‑'A'ẓam wa‑l‑Khāqān al‑Mukarram, Jam‑i‑Sulṭānat‑i‑Ḥaqīqī wa‑Majāzī, Sayyid al‑Salāṭīn, Abu'l‑Muẓaffar Naṣīr‑ud‑Dīn Muḥammad Humayūn Pādshāh Ghāzī, Ẓillu'llāh
Posthumous name
- Jannat-Ashyani (lit. 'He who lives in heaven')
- House: Mughal
- Dynasty: Timurid
- Father: Babur
- Mother: Maham Begum
- Religion: Sunni Islam
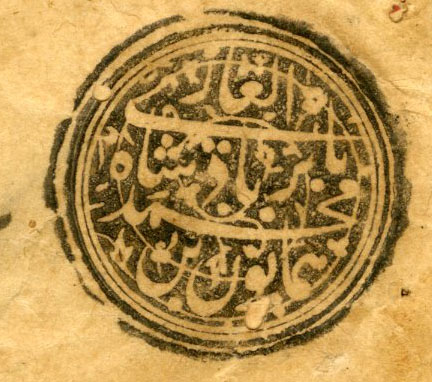
- Seal
- Military career
- Allegiance: Mughal Empire
- Branch: Mughal Army
- Conflicts: See list: Mughal–Rajput Wars; Khanwa (1527); Mughal conquest of Gujarat (1535); Mughal–Afghan Wars; Hisar Firoza (1526); Ghaghra (1529); Chausa (1539); Kannauj (1540); Machhiwara (1555); Sirhind (1555)

Nasir al-Din Muhammad (Persian: نصیرالدین محمد, 6 March 1508 – 27 January 1556), commonly known by his regnal name Humayun (Persian: همایون, Persian pronunciation: [hu.mɑː.juːn]), was the second Mughal emperor, who ruled much of what is now eastern Afghanistan, Bangladesh, Northern India, and Pakistan from 1530 to 1540 and again from 1555 to his death in 1556. At the time of his death, the Mughal Empire spanned almost one million square kilometers.

On 26 December 1530, Humayun succeeded his father Babur to the throne of Delhi as ruler of the Mughal territories in the Indian subcontinent. Humayun was an inexperienced ruler when he came to power at the age of 22. His half-brother Kamran Mirza inherited Kabul and Kandahar, the northernmost parts of their father's empire; the two half-brothers became bitter rivals.

Early in his reign, Humayun lost his entire empire to Sher Shah Suri but regained it 15 years later with Safavid aid. His return from Persia was accompanied by a large retinue of Persian noblemen, signaling an important change in Mughal court culture. The Central Asian origins of the dynasty were largely overshadowed by the influences of Persian art, architecture, language, and literature. To this day, stone carvings and thousands of Persian manuscripts in India dating from the time of Humayun remain in the subcontinent. Following his return to power, Humayun quickly expanded the Empire, leaving a substantial legacy for his son, Akbar.

== Background ==
Humayun was born as Nasir al-Din Muhammad to Babur's favourite wife Māham Begum on Tuesday 6 March 1508. According to Abul Fazl, Māham was related to the noble family of Sultan Husayn Bayqara, the Timurid ruler of Herat. She was also related to Sheikh Ahmad-e Jami, a Persian mystic and poet.

The decision of Babur to divide the territories of his empire between two of his sons was unusual in India, although it had been a common Central Asian practice since the time of Genghis Khan. Unlike most monarchies, which practised primogeniture, the Timurids followed the example of Genghis and did not leave an entire kingdom to the eldest son. Although under that system only a Chingissid could claim sovereignty and Khanal authority, any male Chinggisid within a given sub-branch had an equal right to the throne (though the Timurids were not Chinggisid in their paternal ancestry). While Genghis Khan's empire had been peacefully divided between his sons upon his death, almost every Chinggisid succession since had resulted in fratricide.

After Timur's death, his territories were divided among Pir Muhammad, Miran Shah, Khalil Sultan and Shah Rukh, which resulted in inter-family warfare. Not all umarah (nobles) viewed Humayun as Babur's rightful successor. While Babur was still alive, some of the nobles tried unsuccessfully to install his brother-in-law, Mahdi Khwaja, as ruler. Upon Babur's death, Humayun's territories were the least secure.

== Early reign ==
When Humayun came to the throne of Mughal Empire, several of his brothers revolted against him after he split the empire among them. Another brother, Hindal Mirza, supported Humayun but was assassinated. The Emperor commenced construction of a tomb for his brother, but this was not yet finished when he was forced to flee to Persia. Sher Shah Suri destroyed the structure and no further work was done on it after Humayun's restoration.

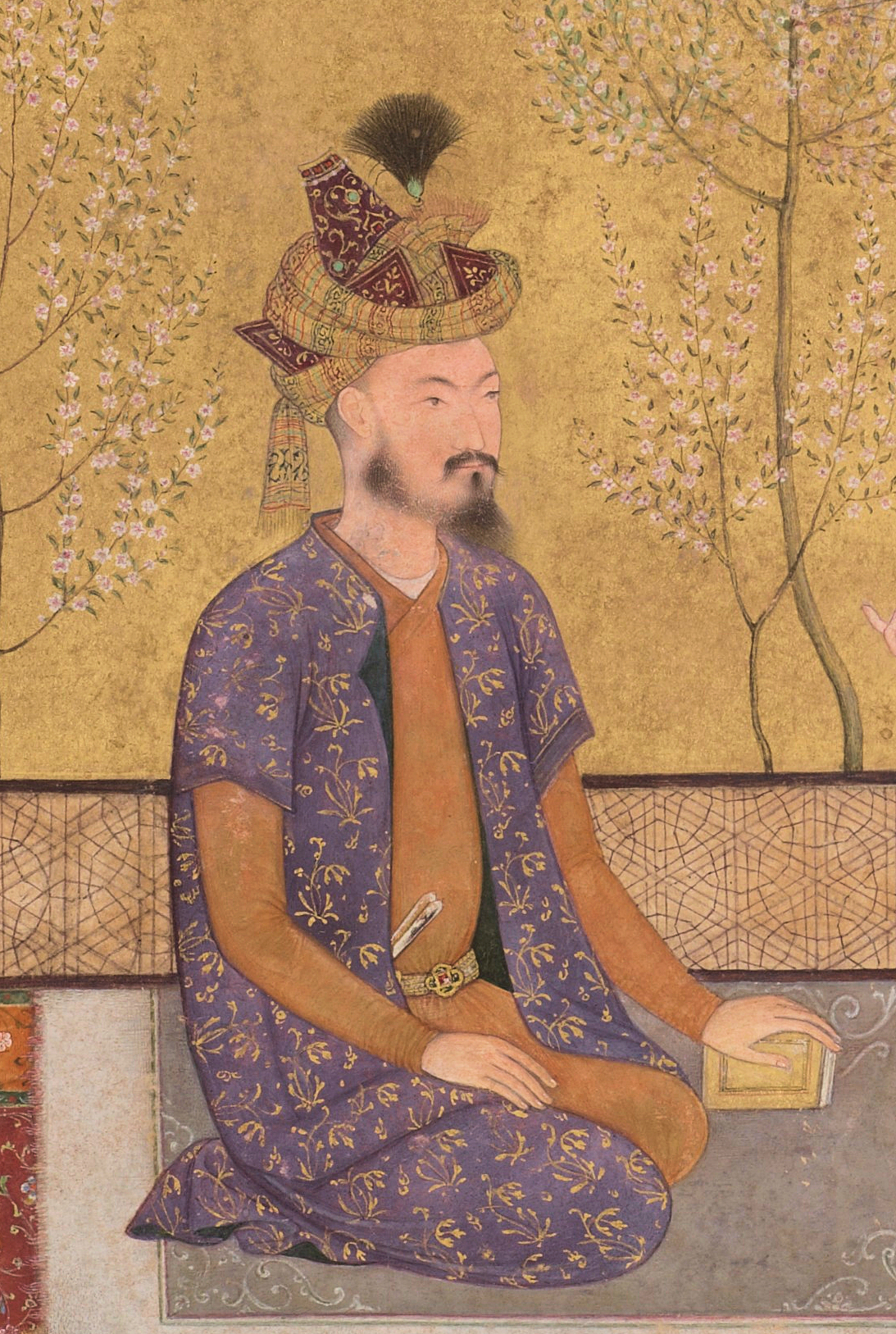
Portrait of Humayun, wearing the Tāj-i 'Izzat headdress, in the Late Shah Jahan Album, painted c. 1640. Smithsonian Collections.

Humayun had two major rivals for his lands: Sultan Bahadur of Gujarat to the southwest and Sher Shah Suri (Sher Khan) settled along the river Ganges in Bihar to the east. Humayun's first campaign was to confront Sher Shah Suri. Halfway through this offensive, Humayun had to abandon it to focus on Gujarat, where a threat from Ahmed Shah had emerged. Humayun was victorious annexing Gujarat, Malwa, Champaner and the great fort of Mandu.

During the first five years of Humayun's reign, Bahadur and Sher Khan extended their rule, although Sultan Bahadur faced pressure in the east from sporadic conflicts with the Portuguese.

In 1535 Humayun was made aware that the Sultan of Gujarat was planning an assault on the Mughal territories in Bayana with Portuguese aid. Humayun gathered an army and marched on Bahadur. Within a month he had captured the forts of Mandu and Champaner. However, instead of pressing his attack, Humayun ceased the campaign and consolidated his newly conquered territory. Sultan Bahadur, meanwhile escaped and took up refuge with the Portuguese. Like his father, Humayun was a frequent user of opium. In a popular revolt Bahadur Shah recaptured all of Gujarat in 1536 and began an attack on Malwa.

== Strife with Sher Shah Suri ==
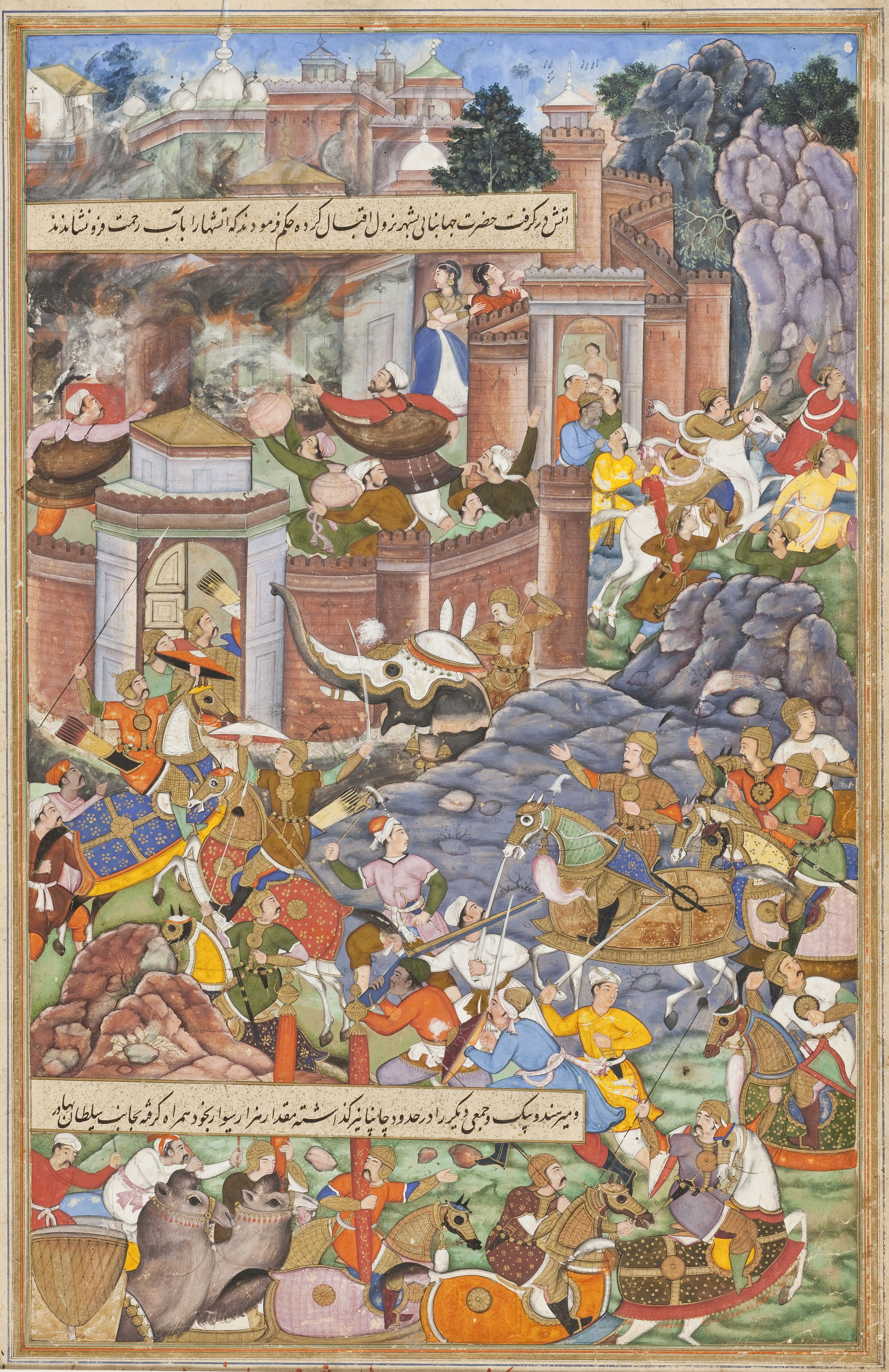
The Mughal Emperor Humayun, fights Bahadur Shah of Gujarat, in the year 1535.

Shortly after Humayun had marched on Gujarat, Sher Shah Suri saw an opportunity to wrest control of Agra from the Mughals. He began to gather his army together hoping for a rapid and decisive siege of the Mughal capital. Upon hearing this alarming news, Humayun quickly marched his troops back to Agra allowing Bahadur to easily regain control of the territories Humayun had recently taken. In February 1537, however, Bahadur was killed when a botched plan to kidnap the Portuguese viceroy ended in a fire-fight that the Sultan lost. Bahadur's passing caused a power vacuum in Gujarat, which ultimately paved the way for the Mughals to become the region's dominant force.

While Humayun was occupied in Gujarat, in the east Sher Khan invaded Bengal and besieged Gaur, its capital. Humayun set off to relieve the siege, but was delayed while taking Chunar, a fort occupied by Sher Shah's son, in order to protect his troops from an attack from the rear. Meanwhile, Gaur fell, the large stores of grain there were emptied, and Humayun arrived to see corpses littering the roads. The vast wealth of Bengal was depleted and brought east, giving Sher Shah a substantial war chest.

Sher Shah withdrew to the west, but Humayun did not follow; instead, he "shut himself up for a considerable time in his Harem, and abandoned himself to every kind of luxury". Hindal, Humayun's 19-year-old brother, had agreed to aid him in this battle and protect the rear from attack, but he abandoned his position and withdrew to Agra, where he decreed himself acting emperor. When Humayun sent the grand Mufti, Sheikh Buhlul, to reason with him; the Sheikh was killed. Further provoking the rebellion, Hindal ordered that the Khutba, or sermon, in the main mosque be surrounded.

Humayun's other brother, Kamran Mirza, marched from his territories in the Punjab, ostensibly to aid Humayun. However, his return home had treacherous motives as he intended to stake a claim for Humayun's apparently collapsing empire. He brokered a deal with Hindal providing that his brother would cease all acts of disloyalty in return for a share in the new empire, which Kamran would create once Humayun was deposed.

In June 1539, Sher Shah met Humayun in the Battle of Chausa on the banks of the Ganges, near Buxar. This was to become an entrenched battle in which both sides spent a lot of time digging themselves into positions. The major part of the Mughal army, the artillery, was now immobile, and Humayun decided to engage in some diplomacy using Muhammad Aziz as ambassador. Humayun agreed to allow Sher Shah to rule over Bengal and Bihar, but only as provinces granted to him by his Emperor, Humayun, falling short of outright sovereignty. The two rulers also struck a bargain in order to save face: Humayun's troops would charge those of Sher Shah whose forces then retreat in feigned fear. Thus honour would, supposedly, be satisfied.

Once the Army of Humayun had made its charge and Sher Shah's troops made their agreed-upon retreat, the Mughal troops relaxed their defensive preparations and returned to their entrenchments without posting a proper guard. Observing the Mughals' vulnerability, Sher Shah reneged on his earlier agreement. That very night, his army approached the Mughal camp and finding the Mughal troops unprepared with a majority asleep, they advanced and killed most of them. The Emperor survived by swimming across the Ganges using an air-filled "water skin", and quietly returned to Agra. Humayun was assisted across the Ganges by Shams al-Din Muhammad.

=== In Agra ===
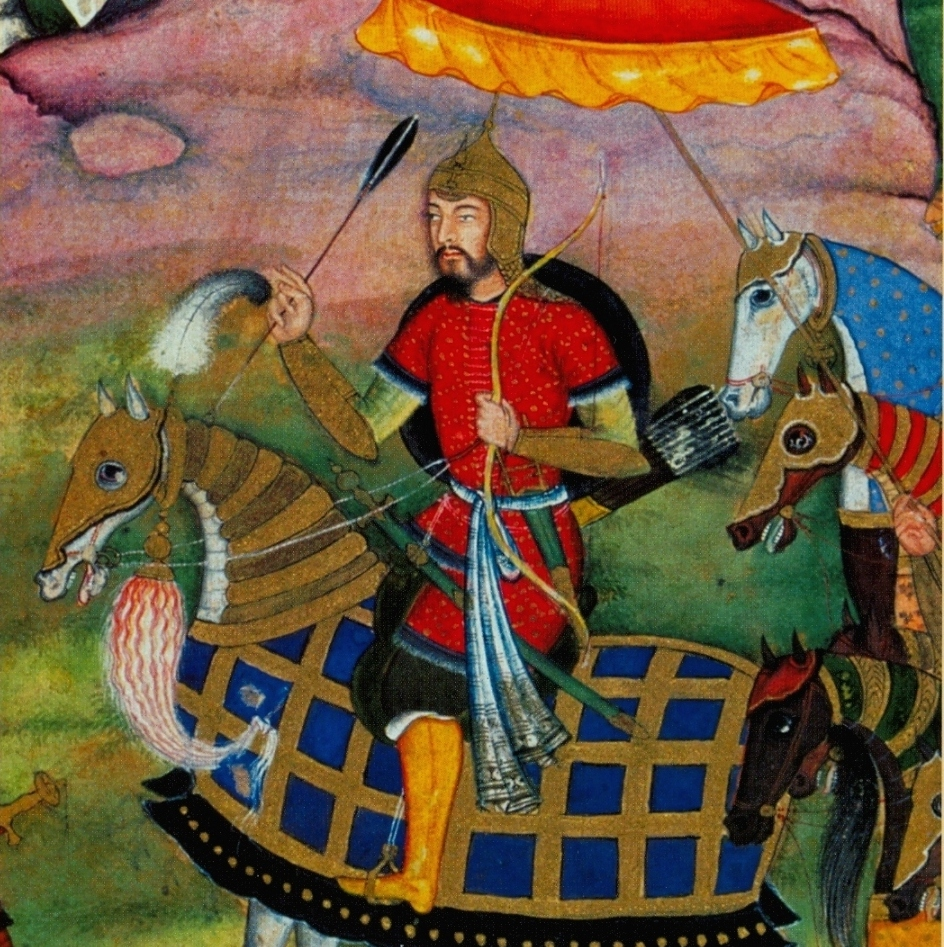
Humayun, detail of miniature of the Baburnama, painted circa 1590

When Humayun returned to Agra, he found that all three of his brothers were present. Humayun once again not only pardoned his brothers for plotting against him, but even forgave Hindal for his outright betrayal. With his armies travelling at a leisurely pace, Sher Shah was gradually drawing closer and closer to Agra. This was a serious threat to the entire family, but Humayun and Kamran squabbled over how to proceed. Kamran withdrew after Humayun refused to make a quick attack on the approaching enemy, instead opting to build a larger army under his own name.

When Kamran returned to Lahore, Humayun, with his other brothers Askari and Hindal, marched to meet Sher Shah 200 kilometres (120 mi) east of Agra at the battle of Kannauj on 17 May 1540. Humayun was soundly defeated. He retreated to Agra, pursued by Sher Shah, and thence through Delhi to Lahore. Sher Shah's founding of the short-lived Sur Empire, with its capital at Delhi, resulted in Humayun's exile for 15 years in the court of Shah Tahmasp I.

=== In Lahore ===
The four brothers were united in Lahore, but every day they were informed that Sher Shah was getting closer and closer. When he reached Sirhind, Humayun sent an ambassador carrying the message "I have left you the whole of Hindustan [i.e. the lands to the East of Punjab, comprising most of the Ganges Valley]. Leave Lahore alone, and let Sirhind be a boundary between you and me." Sher Shah, however, replied "I have left you Kabul. You should go there". Kabul was the capital of the empire of Humayun's brother Kamran, who was far from willing to hand over any of his territories to his brother. Instead, Kamran approached Sher Shah and proposed that he actually revolt against his brother and side with Sher Shah in return for most of the Punjab. Sher Shah dismissed his help, believing it not to be required, though word soon spread to Lahore about the treacherous proposal, and Humayun was urged to make an example of Kamran and kill him. Humayun refused, citing the last words of his father, Babur, "Do nothing against your brothers, even though they may deserve it."

=== Meeting with the Sikh Guru – Guru Angad Sahib ===
Humayun visited Guru Angad at around 1540 after Humayun lost the Battle of Kannauj, and thereby the Mughal throne to Sher Shah Suri. According to Sikh hagiographies, when Humayun arrived in Gurdwara Mal Akhara Sahib at Khadur Sahib, Guru Angad was sitting and teaching children. The failure to greet the Emperor immediately angered Humayun. Humayun lashed out but the Guru reminded him that "the time when you needed to fight when you lost your throne, you ran away and did not fight, and now you want to attack a person engaged in prayer." In the Sikh texts written more than a century after the event, Guru Angad is said to have blessed the emperor, and reassured him that someday he will regain the throne.

=== Withdrawing further ===
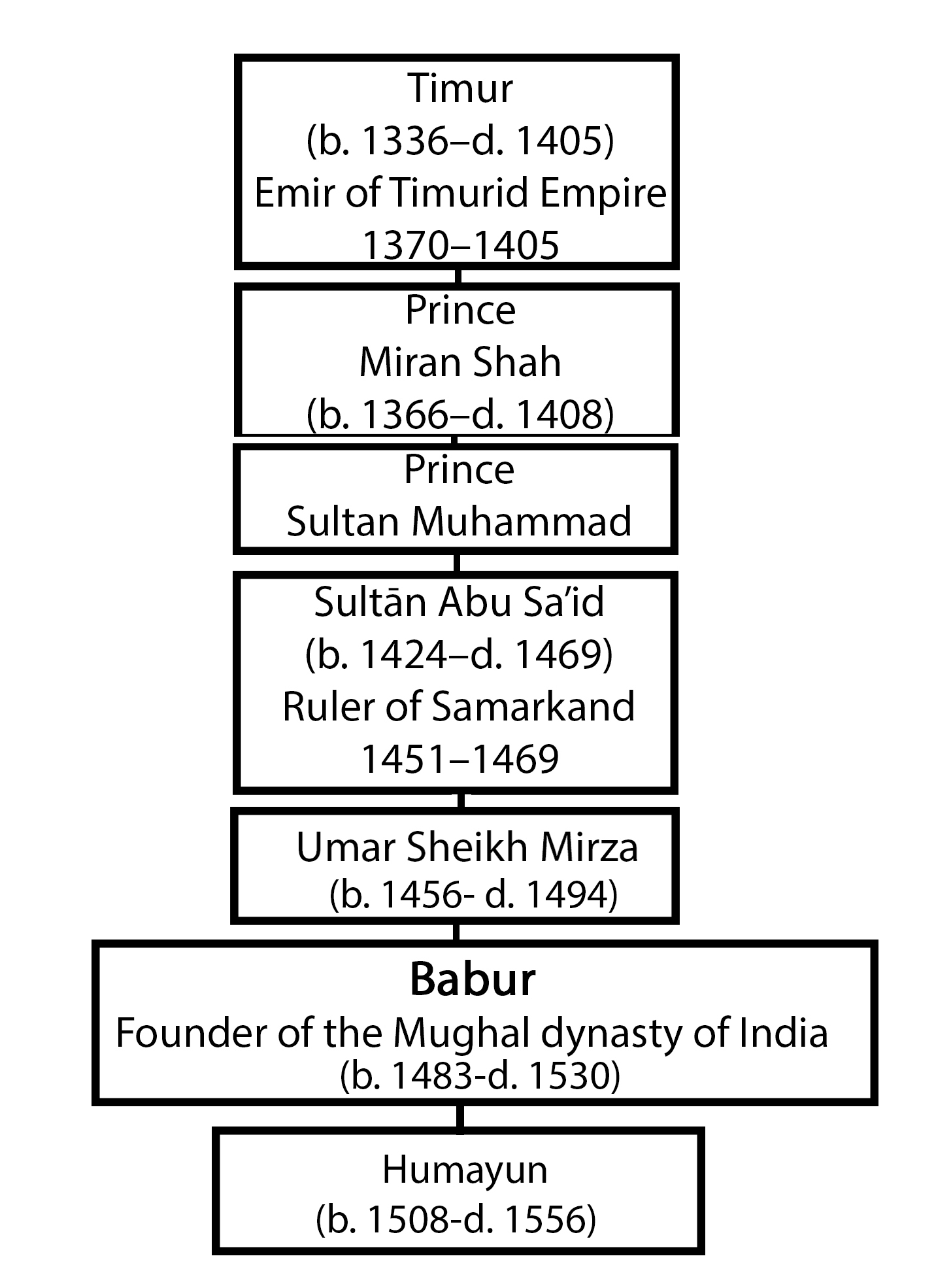
Humayun's Genealogical Order up to Timur

Humayun decided it would be wise to withdraw still further. He and his army rode out through and across the Thar Desert, when the Hindu ruler Rao Maldeo Rathore allied with Sher Shah Suri against the Mughal Empire. In many accounts Humayun mentions how he and his pregnant wife had to trace their steps through the desert at the hottest time of year. Their rations were low, and they had little to eat; even drinking water was a major problem in the desert. When Hamida Bano's horse died, no one would lend the Queen (who was now eight months pregnant) a horse, so Humayun did so himself, resulting in him riding a camel for six kilometres (four miles), although Khaled Beg then offered him his mount. Humayun was later to describe this incident as the lowest point in his life. Humayun asked that his brothers join him as he fell back into Sindh. While the previously rebellious Hindal Mirza remained loyal and was ordered to join his brothers in Kandahar, Kamran Mirza and Askari Mirza instead decided to head to the relative peace of Kabul. This was to be a definitive schism in the family. Humayun headed for Sindh because he expected aid from the Emir of Sindh, Hussein Umrani, whom he had appointed and who owed him his allegiance. Also, his wife Hamida hailed from Sindh; she was the daughter of a prestigious pir family (a pir is an Islamic religious guide) of Persian heritage long settled in Sindh. En route to the Emir's court, Humayun had to break journey because his pregnant wife Hamida was unable to travel further. Humayun sought refuge with the Hindu ruler of the oasis town of Amarkot (now part of Sindh province).

Rana Prasad Rao of Amarkot duly welcomed Humayun into his home and sheltered the refugees for several months. Here, in the household of a Hindu Rajput nobleman, Humayun's wife Hamida Bano, daughter of a Persian family, gave birth to the future Emperor Akbar on 15 October 1542. The date of birth is well established because Humayun consulted his astronomer to utilise the astrolabe and check the location of the planets. The infant was the long-awaited heir-apparent to the 34-year-old Humayun and the answer of many prayers. Shortly after the birth, Humayun and his party left Amarkot for Sindh, leaving Akbar behind, who was not ready for the grueling journey ahead in his infancy. He was later adopted by Askari Mirza.

For a change, Humayun was not deceived in the character of the man on whom he has pinned his hopes. Emir Hussein Umrani, ruler of Sindh, welcomed Humayun's presence and was loyal to him, just as he had been loyal to Babur against the renegade Arghuns. While in Sindh, Humayun alongside Hussein Umrani, gathered horses and weapons and formed new alliances that helped regain lost territories. Until finally Humayun had gathered hundreds of Sindhi and Baloch tribesmen alongside his Mughals and then marched towards Kandahar and later Kabul, thousands more gathered by his side as Humayun continually declared himself the rightful Timurid heir of the first Mughal Emperor, Babur.

== Retreat to Kabul ==
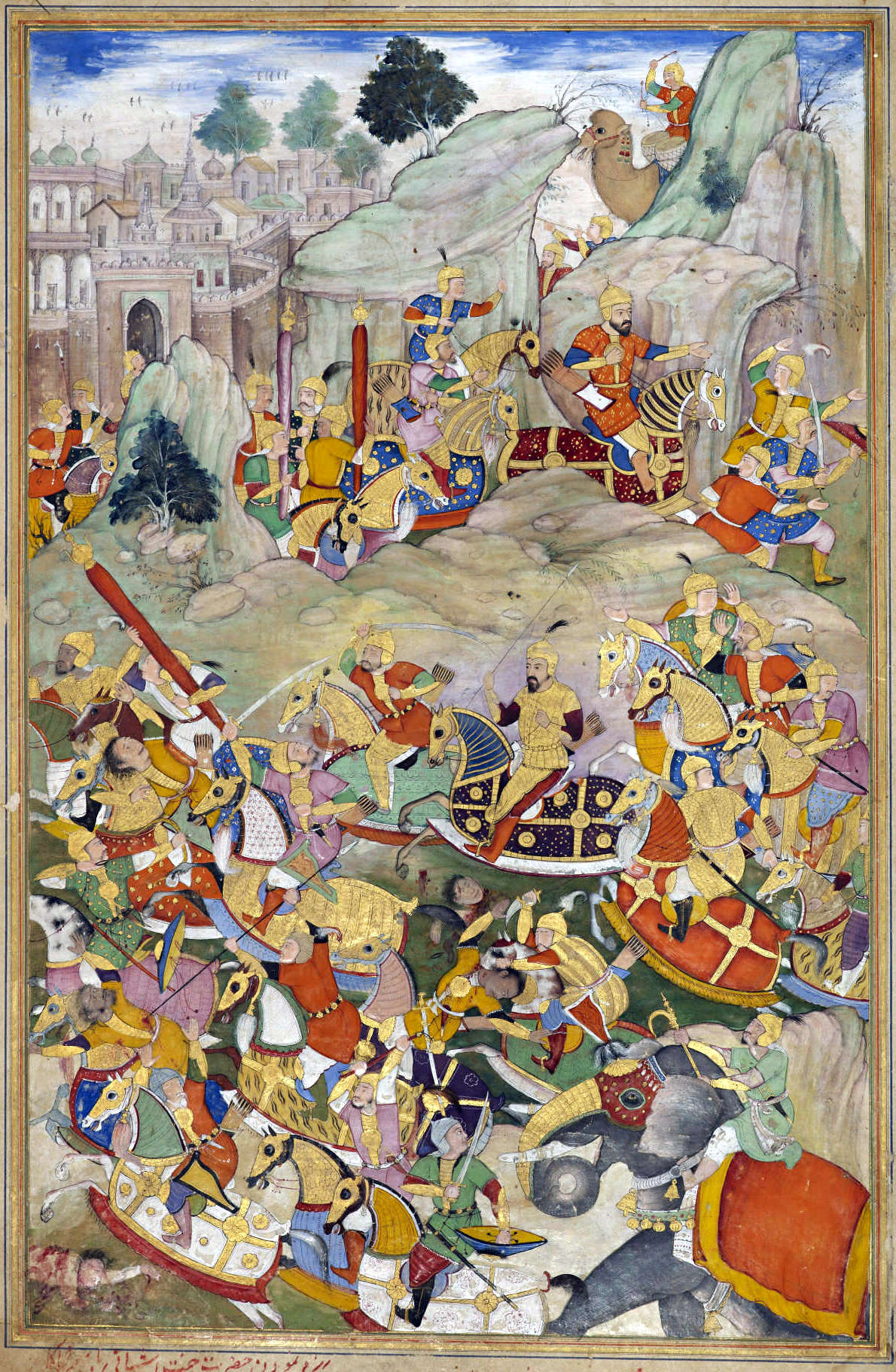
Humayun and his Mughal Army defeats Kamran Mirza in 1553.

After Humayun set out from his expedition in Sindh, along with 300 camels (mostly wild) and 2000 loads of grain, he set off to join his brothers in Kandahar after crossing the Indus River on 11 July 1543 along with the ambition to regain the Mughal Empire and overthrow the Suri dynasty. Among the tribes that had sworn allegiance to Humayun were the Leghari, Magsi, Rind and many others.

In Kamran Mirza's territory, Hindal Mirza had been placed under house arrest in Kabul after refusing to have the Khutba recited in Kamran Mirza's name. His other brother, Askari Mirza, was now ordered to gather an army and march on Humayun. When Humayun received word of the approaching hostile army he decided against facing them, and instead sought refuge elsewhere. Akbar was left behind in camp close to Kandahar, as it was December, too cold and dangerous to include the 14-month-old toddler in the march through the mountains of the Hindu Kush. Askari Mirza took Akbar in, leaving the wives of Kamran and Askari Mirza to raise him. The Akbarnama specifies Kamran Mirza's wife, Sultan Begam.

Once again Humayun turned toward Kandahar where his brother Kamran Mirza was in power, but he received no help and had to seek refuge with the Shah of Persia.

== Refuge in Persia ==
Humayun fled to the refuge of the Safavid Empire in Persia, marching with 40 men, his wife Bega Begum, and her companion through mountains and valleys. Among other trials, the imperial party were forced to live on horse meat boiled in the soldiers' helmets. These indignities continued during the month it took them to reach Herat. However, after their arrival they were reintroduced to the finer things in life. Upon entering the city his army was greeted with an armed escort, and they were treated to lavish food and clothing. They were given fine accommodation and the roads were cleared and cleaned before them. The Shah, Tahmasp I, unlike Humayun's own family, welcomed the Mughal, and treated him as a royal visitor. After his arrival in Herat, Humayun went sightseeing and was amazed at the Persian artwork and architecture he saw: much of this was the work sponsored by the Timurid Sultan Husayn Bayqarah and his ancestor, princess Gauhar Shad. Thus Humayun was able to admire the work of his relatives and ancestors at first hand.

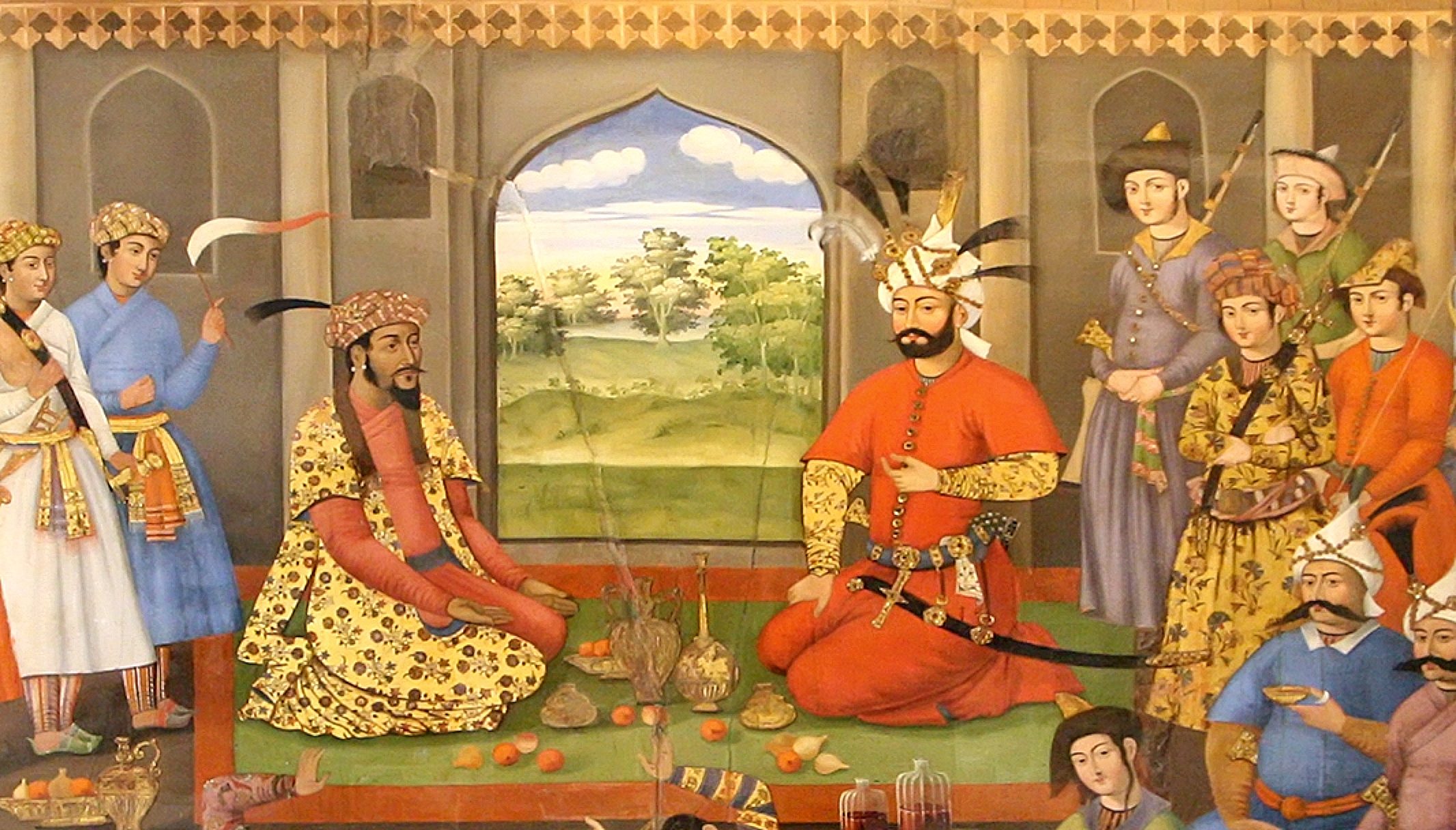
Encounter of Humayun (left) and Shah Tahmasp I (right) in Soltaniyeh in 1544. Chehel Sotoun Palace, Isfahan, painted a century later circa 1647. Shah Tahmasp provided Humayun with 12,000 cavalry and 300 veterans of his personal guard along with provisions, so that his guest could recover his lost domains.

The Mughal monarch was introduced to the work of the Persian miniaturists, and Kamaleddin Behzad sent two of his pupils to join Humayun's court. Humayun was amazed by their work and asked if they would serve him if he regained the sovereignty of Hindustan; they agreed. With so much happening, Humayun did not meet Tahmasp until July, six months after his arrival in Persia. After a lengthy journey from Herat the two met in Qazvin where a large feast and parties were held for the event. The meeting of the two emperors is depicted in a famous wall-painting in the Chehel Sotoun (Forty Columns) palace in Esfahan.

Tahmasp urged that Humayun convert from Sunni to Shia Islam in order to keep himself and several hundred followers alive. Although the Mughals initially disagreed to their conversion they knew that with this outward acceptance of Shi'ism, Tahmasp was eventually prepared to offer Humayun more substantial support. When Humayun's brother, Kamran Mirza, offered to cede Kandahar to the Persians in exchange for Humayun, dead or alive, Tahmasp refused. Instead he staged a celebration, with 300 tents, an imperial Persian carpet, 12 musical bands and "meat of all kinds". Here the Shah announced that 12,000 elite cavalry and 300 veterans of Shah's personal guard along with provisions were Humayun's so that he could lead an attack on Kamran and recover his lost domains. All that Tahmasp asked was for Kandahar would be his if Humayun's forces were victorious.

== Kandahar and onward ==
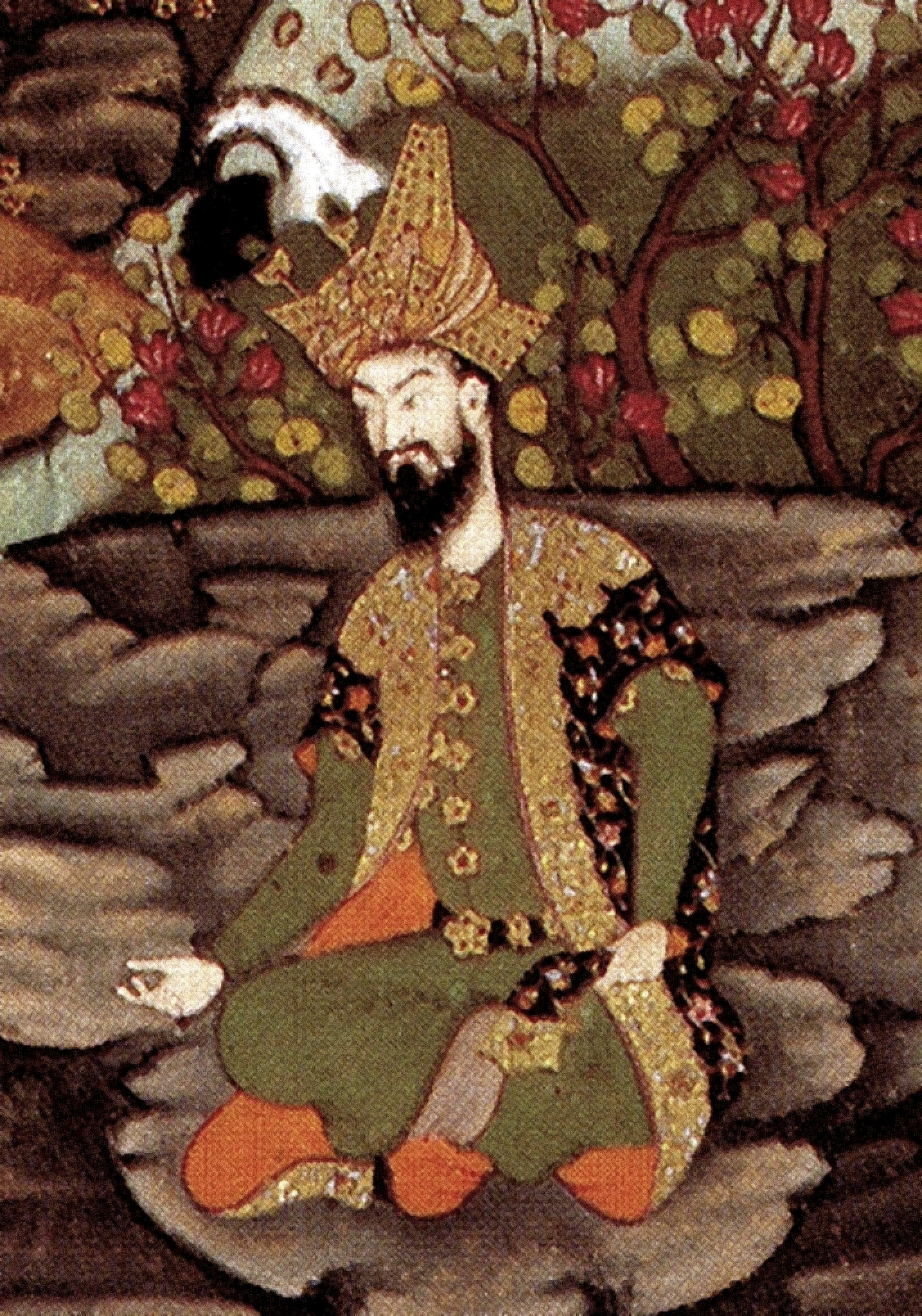
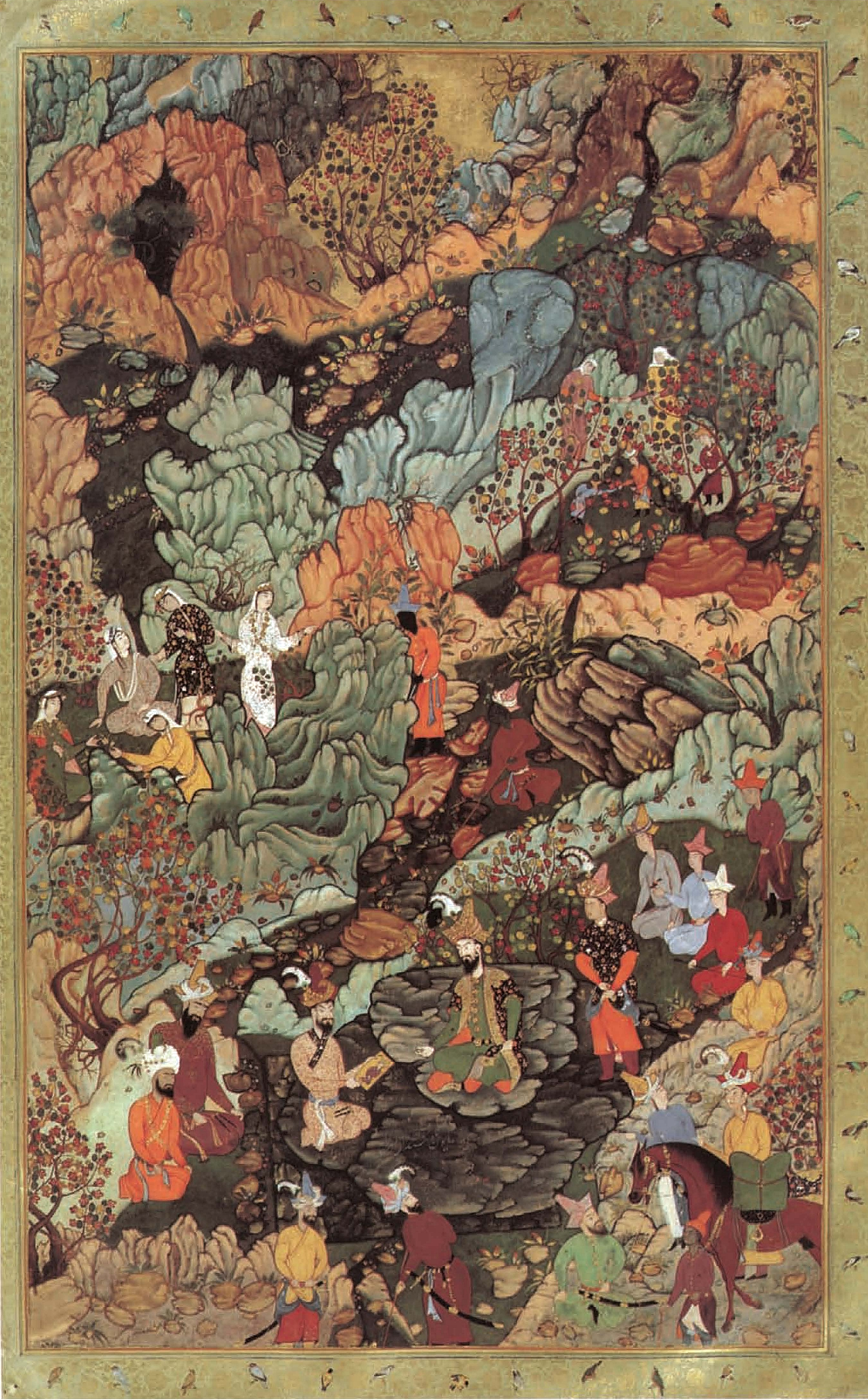
Portrait of Humayun and his brothers, from life, by Persian artist Dust Muhammad, c.1546, Kabul. Humayun's face was later damaged as it travelled to the India! Art and Culture exhibition in 1985.

On 21 March 1545, Humayun, with the Safavid support, reached the area around Kandahar with 14,000 Persian soldiers and began a siege. During the siege, he sent Bairam Khan to Kabul in an effort to win over the Timurid princes and nobles. On 3 September 1545, Mirza Askari gave up the fort, and Kandahar was handed over to the Persians as agreed. However, the Persian troops stopped offering further assistance. With his own supporters gathering but lacking shelter, Humayun felt forced to act. One month later, he launched a surprise attack on Kandahar, drove out the Persian garrison, and took control of the city despite having promised it to Shah Tahmasp. After appointing Bairam Khan as governor of Kandahar, Humayun set off for Kabul. Mirza Hindal joined him on the journey, while desertions in his own camp forced Kamran Mirza to escape into Sind. By 18 November 1545, Humayun entered Kabul without resistance and soon met his son Akbar after nearly two years. With both Kandahar and Kabul under his control, he effectively dominated southern Afghanistan.

In March 1546, Humayun began a campaign in northern Afghanistan, Badakhshan, against the local ruler, Mirza Sulaiman, who had recently been freed from Kamran's influence in Kabul. Accompanied by Askari, Humayun ordered the execution of Yadgar Nasir Mirza because he was showing signs of disloyalty. At Tirgiran, he defeated Sulaiman, who then fled to Kulab. Humayun continued on to Kishm and Qila Zafar, but a serious illness weakened his forces and allowed Kamran to leave Sindh. With help from his father-in-law Shah Husain, Kamran returned to Afghanistan, captured Ghazni (executing its governor Zahid Beg), and advanced on Kabul. Kamran took Kabul by force, terrorising many of Humayun's supporters. Despite harsh winter conditions, Humayun hurried back, besieged the city for several months, and the fighting became so fierce that Kamran even placed Akbar on the battlements, exposing him to enemy fire. Realising he could not hold the fort, Kamran escaped through a breach in the wall on 27 April 1547, narrowly avoiding capture. Initially seeking support from Mirza Sulaiman, Kamran then allied with the Uzbek chief Pir Muhammad Khan of Balkh to capture much of Badakhshan.

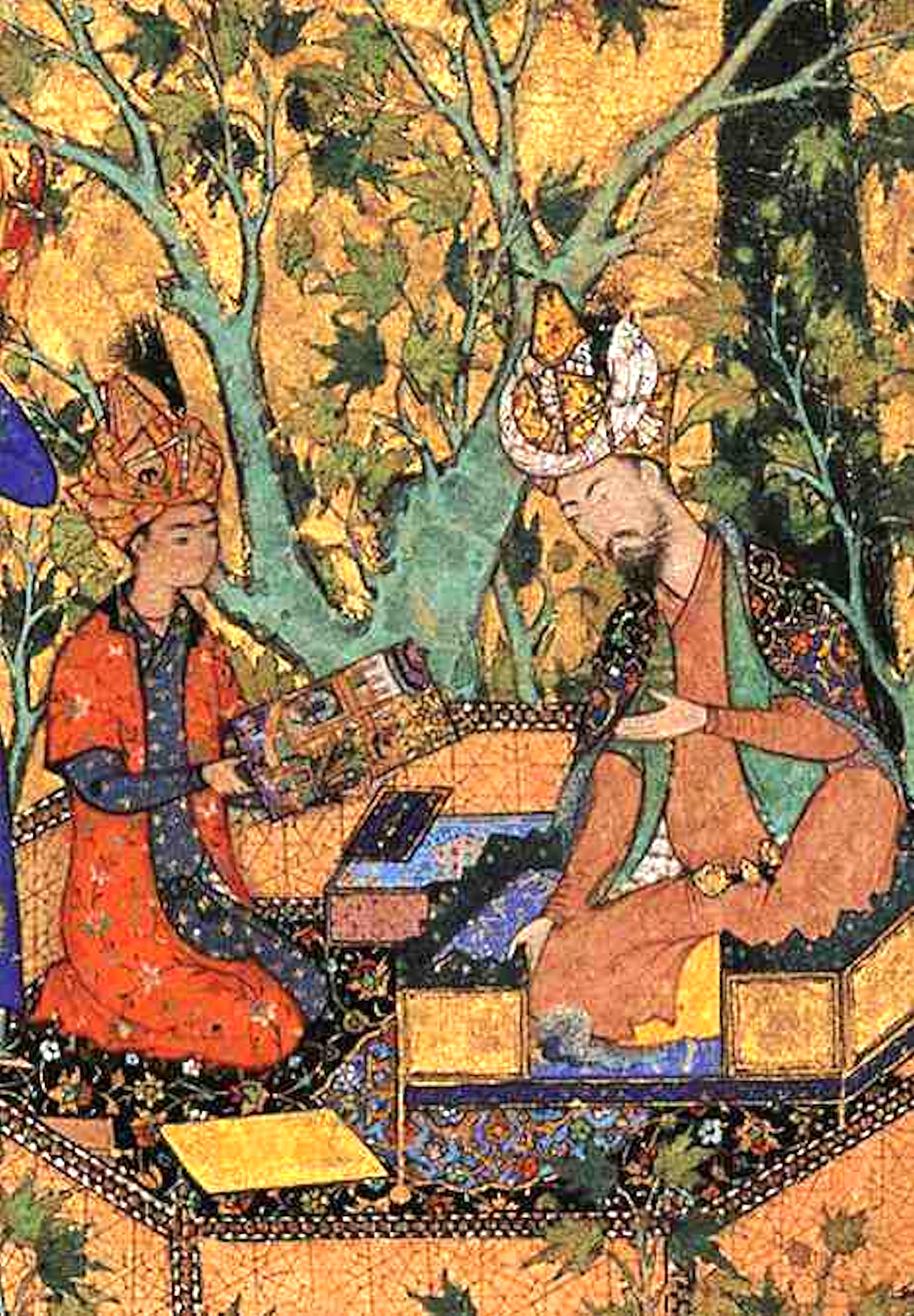
The infant Akbar presents a painting to his father Humayun. Contemporary painting made from life in Kabul, circa 1550-56

In response, Humayun launched a second campaign against Badakhshan in June 1548. He travelled through Andarab, where Mirza Hindal joined him from Qunduz, to Taliqan, which he besieged. When Kamran failed to secure further Uzbek support, he surrendered on 17 August 1548 and was granted Kulab, north of the Oxus, as his fief, a move that was seen as an insult by the former rulers of Kabul and Badakhshan. Humayun then returned to Kabul in October. By February 1549, Humayun led another campaign, this time against Balkh and the Uzbeks, who had long been his enemies. Even though Mirza Hindal and Mirza Sulaiman supported him, Kamran refused to help. Early successes against Pir Muhammad Khan's forces nearly enabled Humayun to capture Balkh, but the news of Kamran's attack on Kabul demoralised his troops, resulting in a chaotic retreat and heavy losses. Meanwhile, Kamran seized Taliqan and Qila Zafar and clashed with Mirza Hindal, though he was eventually forced back into the Hazara region.

Around mid-1550, Humayun marched from Kabul toward Ghurband to punish his unruly brother. In a narrow pass known as the Qibchaq defile, Kamran ambushed him, causing significant casualties and wounding Humayun. Kamran quickly took control of Kabul and held it for three months, while many believed Humayun to be dead as he hid in Andarab. Reinforcements sent by Mirza Sulaiman's wife enabled Humayun to challenge Kamran, and after a hard-fought battle for Kabul, Kamran was forced to flee. His ally, Mirza 'Askari, was captured and exiled. Even after regaining Kabul, Humayun still faced the threat from Kamran, who had teamed up with the influential officer Haji Muhammad Khan. To deal with this danger, Humayun recalled Bairam Khan from Qandahar. Bairam Khan succeeded in persuading Haji Muhammad Khan to switch sides. Already hardened by past betrayals—evident in the executions of Yadgar Nasir Mirza and the exile of 'Askari—Humayun ordered the execution of Haji Muhammad Khan. Kamran then rallied Afghan forces and stirred up trouble between Kabul and the Indus. On the night of 20 November 1551, Kamran launched a surprise attack at Jiryar in Nangarhar. Although Kamran was ultimately defeated, Mirza Hindal was killed in the conflict. Humayun pursued Kamran, who fled to Punjab and sought refuge with Islam Shah, though he received little support there. Eventually, Kamran found temporary shelter with Sultan Adam, a local Gakkhar chief, who hesitantly handed him over to Humayun. On his nobles' advice, Humayun had Kamran blinded in 1553 and sent him off to Mecca. Later historians noted that Kamran suffered more from the turmoil than he caused.

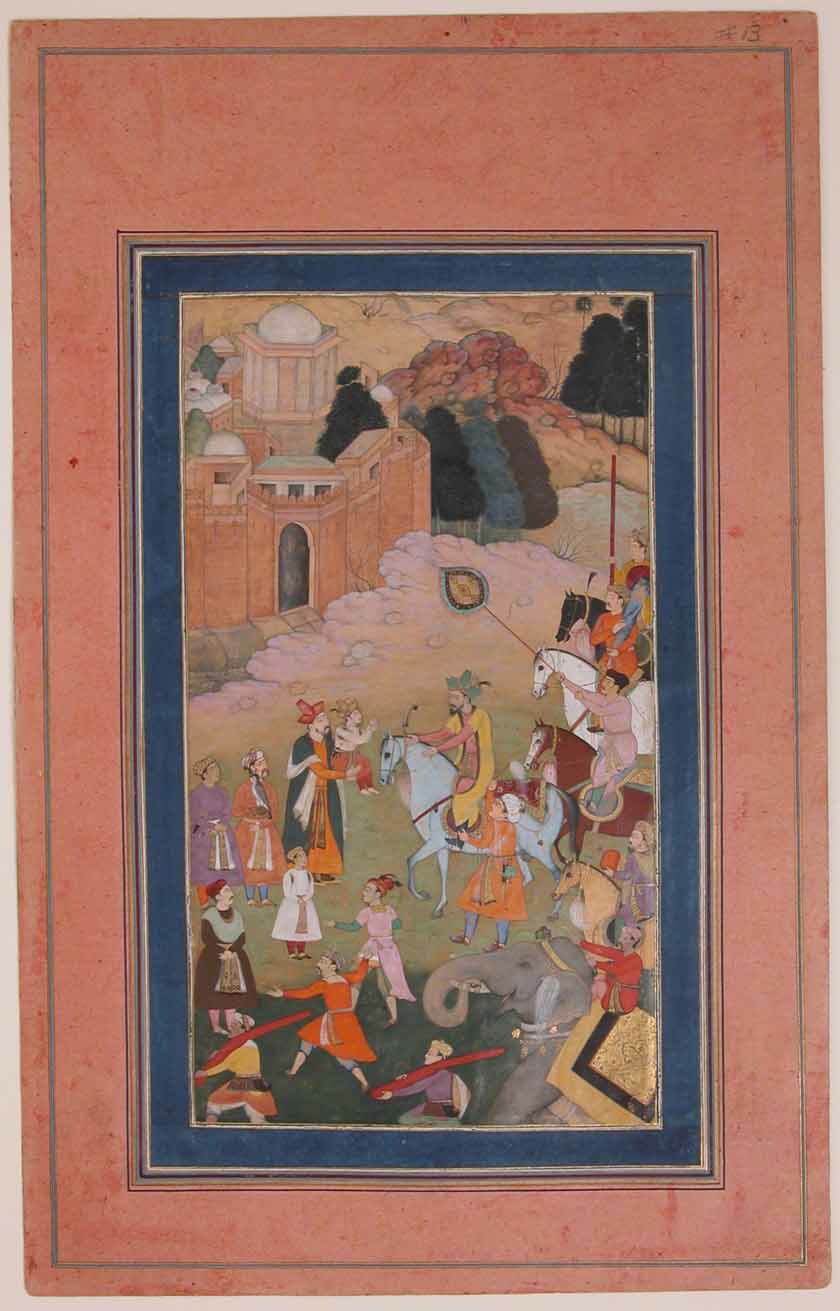
Humayun is reunited with Akbar.

After these events, Humayun planned an expedition into Kashmir, where a brief Mughal rule under Haidar Mirza had ended two years earlier, but opposition from his advisors forced him to return to Kabul in December 1553. Throughout these struggles in Afghanistan, Humayun's position was strongly supported by Bairam Khan, who managed Kandahar as a secure base. By 1554, Bairam Khan left Kandahar to join Humayun as he prepared for an Indian campaign. At that time, Humayun had firm control over Kandahar, Kabul, and Ghazni, and with his brothers out of the picture, no rival threatened his throne. When news arrived of Islam Shah's death and of widespread chaos in India marked by the rule of the young Firuz and civil war among the Afghans—Humayun realized it was time to make another bid for the throne of Delhi.

== Restoration of the Mughal Empire ==
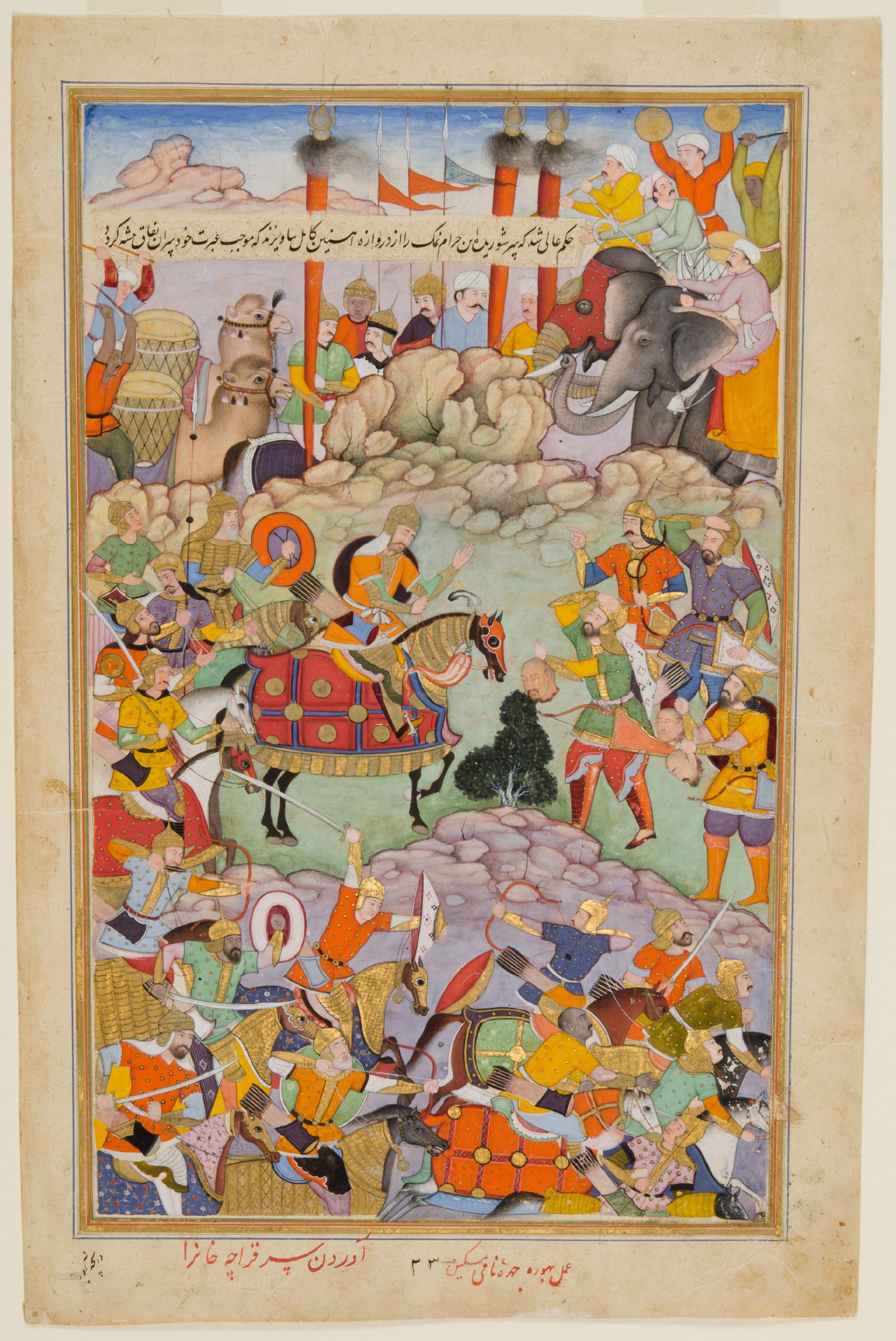
Humayun receiving the head of his opponent, Qaracha Khan.

Humayun gathered a vast army and attempted the challenging task of retaking the throne in Delhi. Due to the Safavid role in Humayun's army, the vast majority of the soldiers were of the Shi'a faith. As one Shaikh Ahmad described to Humayun, "My king, I see the whole of your army are Rafizi... Everywhere the names of your soldiers are of this kind. I find they are all Yar Ali or Kashfi Ali or Haider Ali and I have, not found a single man bearing the names of the other Companions." Humayun placed the army under the leadership of Bairam Khan, a wise move given Humayun's record of military ineptitude, and it turned out to be prescient as Bairam proved himself a great tactician.

Bairam Khan led the army through the Punjab virtually unopposed. The only major battle faced by Humayun's armies was against Sikandar Shah Suri in Sirhind, where Bairam Khan employed a tactic whereby he engaged his enemy in open battle but then retreated quickly in apparent fear. When the enemy followed after them, they were surprised by entrenched defensive positions and were easily annihilated. At the Battle of Sirhind on 22 June 1555, the armies of Sikandar Shah Suri were decisively defeated and the Mughal Empire was reestablished.

After Sirhind fell, most towns and villages chose to welcome the invading army as it made its way to the capital Delhi. On 23 July 1555, Humayun once again sat on Babur's throne in Delhi.

=== Marriage relations with the Khanzadas ===
The Gazetteer of Ulwur states:

Soon after Babur's death, his successor, Humayun, was in AD 1530 supplanted by the Pathan Sher Shah, who, in AD 1545, was followed by Islam Shah. During the reign of the latter a battle was fought and lost by the Emperor's troops at Firozpur Jhirka, in Mewat, on which, however, Islam Shah did not loose his hold. Adil Shah, the third of the Pathan interlopers, who succeeded in AD 1552, had to contend for the Empire with the returned Humayun. In these struggles for the restoration of Babar's dynasty Khanzadas apparently do not figure at all. Humayun seems to have conciliated them by marrying the elder daughter of Jamal Khan, nephew of Babar's opponent, Hasan Khan and, by causing his great minister, Bairam Khan, to marry a younger daughter of the same Mewatti.

=== Ruling Kashmir ===
With all of Humayun's brothers now dead, there was no fear of another usurping his throne during his military campaigns. He was also now an established leader and could trust his generals. With this new-found strength Humayun embarked on a series of military campaigns aimed at extending his reign over areas in the east and west of the subcontinent. His sojourn in exile seems to have reduced his reliance, and his military leadership came to imitate the more effective methods that he had observed in Persia.

== Family ==
=== Consorts ===
- Bega Begum (died 1581), daughter of Yadgar Beg;
- Gulbarg Begum, daughter of Nizam-ud-din Ali Barlas, Babur's Khalifa and Sultanum Begum. She was a former wife of Mir Shah Hussain Arghun;
- Maywa Jan or Mewa Jan, daughter of Khazang yasawal and a servant of Gulbadan Begum;
- Hamida Banu Begum (m. 1541, died 1604), daughter of Sheikh Ali Akbar Jami;
- Mah Chuchak Begum (m. 1546; murdered in 1564), sister of Bairam Oghlan and Faridun Khan Kabuli;
- Khanish Aghacha, daughter of Jujuq Mirza Khwarizmi;
- Agha Jan;
- Chand Bibi;
- Shad Bibi;
- Gunwar Bibi;

=== Issue ===
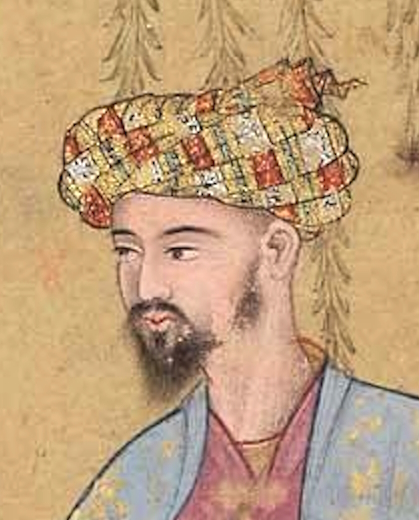
Portrait of Mirza Muhammad Hakim, a son of Humayun. Attributed to Aqa Riza, 1584-1590. Museum of Fine Arts, Boston, 14.609.

Name	Birth	Death	Notes
By Bega Begum (c. 1511 - 17 January 1582)
Al-aman Mirza	1528	1536	Heir apparent of Mughal Empire
Aqiqa Sultan Begum	1531	1539	
By Hamida Banu Begum (c. 1527 - 29 August 1604)
Akbar I	15 October 1542	27 October 1605	Succeeded Humayun to the throne
Two twins daughters	1544	1545	
By Gunwar Bibi
Bakshi Banu Begum	1540	unknown	Married to Mirza Sharif-ud-din Hussain Ahrari;
By unknown
Jahan Sultan Begum	1545	1547	
By Mah Chuchak Begum (unknown - 28 March 1564)
Bakht-un-Nissa Begum	1547	2 June 1608	married twice, and had two sons
Sakina Banu Begum	unknown	25 August 1604	married to Shah Ghazi Khan;
Amina Banu Begum	unknown	unknown	
Mirza Muhammad Hakim	29 April 1553	10 October 1585	Subahdar of Kabul
Farrukh Fal Mirza	1554	d. young	
By Khanish Aghacha
Ibrahim Sultan Mirza	19 April 1553	unknown	

== Character ==
Edward S. Holden writes; "He was uniformly kind and considerate to his dependents, devotedly attached to his son Akbar, to his friends, and to his turbulent brothers. The misfortunes of his reign arose in great part, from his failure to treat them with rigor." He further writes: "The very defects of his character, which render him less admirable as a successful ruler of nations, make us more fond of him as a man. His renown has suffered in that his reign came between the brilliant conquests of Babur and the beneficent statesmanship of Akbar; but he was not unworthy to be the son of the one and the father of the other."

Stanley Lane-Poole writes in his book Medieval India: "His name meant the winner (Lucky/Conqueror), there is no king in the history to be named as wrong as Humayun", he was of a forgiving nature. He further writes, "He was in fact unfortunate ... Scarcely had he enjoyed his throne for six months in Delhi when he slipped down from the polished steps of his palace and died in his forty-ninth year (Jan. 24, 1556). If there was a possibility of falling, Humayun was not the man to miss it. He tumbled through his life and tumbled out of it."

Humayun ordered the crushing by elephant of an imam he mistakenly believed to be critical of his reign.

== Death and legacy ==
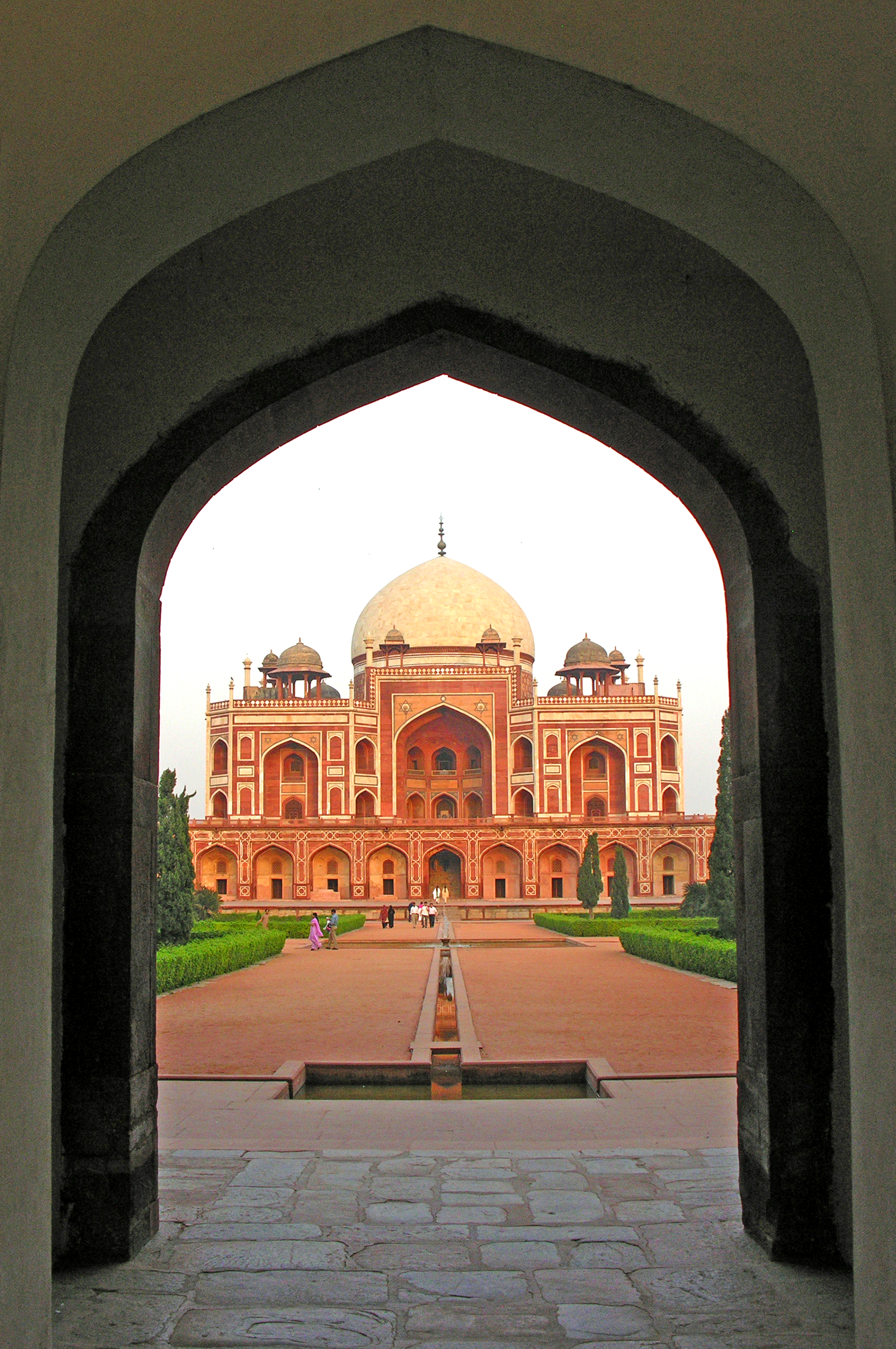
Tomb entrance view

On 24 January 1556, Humayun, with his arms full of books, was descending the staircase from his library Sher Mandal when the muezzin announced the Azaan (the call to prayer). It was his habit, wherever and whenever he heard the summons, to bow his knee in holy reverence. Trying to kneel, he caught his foot in his robe, slipped down several steps and hit his temple on a rugged stone edge. He died three days later. His body was laid to rest in Purana Qila initially, but, because of an attack by Hemu on Delhi and the capture of Purana Qila, Humayun's body was exhumed by the fleeing army and transferred to Kalanaur in Punjab where Akbar was crowned. After young Mughal emperor Akbar defeated and killed Hemu in the Second Battle of Panipat, Humayun's body was buried in Humayun's Tomb in Delhi the first very grand garden tomb in Mughal architecture, setting the precedent later followed by the Taj Mahal and many other Indian monuments. It was commissioned by his favourite and devoted chief wife, Bega Begum.

Akbar later asked his paternal aunt, Gulbadan Begum, to write a biography of his father Humayun, the Humayun nameh (or Humayun-nama), and what she remembered of Babur. The full title is Ahwal Humayun Padshah Jamah Kardom Gulbadan Begum bint Babur Padshah amma Akbar Padshah. She was only eight when Babur died, and was married at 17, and her work is in simple Persian style. Unlike other Mughal royal biographies (the Zafarnama of Timur, Baburnama, and Akbar's own Akbarnama) no richly illustrated copy has survived, and the work is only known from a single battered and slightly incomplete manuscript, now in the British Library, that emerged in the 1860s. Annette Beveridge published an English translation in 1901, and editions in English and Bengali have been published since 2000.

Historians have reassessed Humayun substantially since Stanley Lane-Poole's Edwardian portrait of him as "unfortunate", a framing that shaped English-language treatments for most of the twentieth century. Munis D. Faruqui's The Princes of the Mughal Empire reframes the Timurid appanage system as a structural driver of the conflicts Humayun faced, arguing that his difficulties with Kamran Mirza reflected inherited succession norms rather than personal failure.

John F. Richards's The Mughal Empire places Humayun's Persian exile and return within the broader story of Timurid-Safavid cultural exchange and treats the Persian cultural transmission that followed as a substantive legacy rather than a passive interlude.

== In popular culture ==
- 1945 Indian film Humayun, he was portrayed by Ashok Kumar
- In 1988-89 Indian Series Akbar the Great he was portrayed by Shahid Khan
- 1997 Pakistan series Babar he was portrayed by Babar Ali
- Ankur Nayyar portrayed Humayun in the 2017 Indian television series Akbar Rakht Se Takht Ka Safar.
- In the 2021 Indian drama The Empire he was portrayed by Aditya Seal

== See also ==
- Humayun (film)
- Persian Inscriptions on Indian Monuments
- Dara Shikoh

== Bibliography ==
- Begum, Gulbadan (1902). The History of Humāyūn (Humāyūn-nāmah) (English translation and Persian text). Translated by Annette S. Beveridge. Royal Asiatic Society.; English translation only, as text
- Jawhar (1832). The Tezkereh Al Vakiāt: Or, Private Memoirs of the Moghul Emperor Humayun. Translated by Charles Stewart. Oriental Translation Fund.
- Haig, Wolseley, ed. (1928). The Cambridge History of India. Vol. 3. Cambridge University Press.
- Burn, Richard, ed. (1937). The Cambridge History of India. Vol. 4. planned by Wolseley Haig. Cambridge University Press.
- Irvine, William (1902). The army of the Indian Moghuls: its organization and administration. Luzac.
- Gommans, Jos (2003). Mughal Warfare. New York: Routledge.
- Chisholm, Hugh, ed. (1911). "Humayun" . Encyclopædia Britannica. Vol. 13 (11th ed.). Cambridge University Press. p. 872.

Humayun Timurid dynasty Born: 17 March 1508 Died: 27 January 1556
Regnal titles
Preceded by Babur	Mughal Emperor; 1530–1540	Succeeded by Sher Shah Suri (as Shah of Delhi)
Preceded by Muhammad Adil Shah (as Shah of Delhi)	Mughal Emperor; 1555–1556	Succeeded by Akbar
