= Bakht-un-Nissa Begum =

Mughal princess

- Shahzadi (princess)
- Born: c. 1547; Badakhshan
- Died: 2 June 1608 (aged 60–61); Akbarabad (present day Agra), Mughal Empire
- Spouse: Shah Abdul Ma'ali; Khawaja Hasan Naqshbandi
- Issue: Mirza Badi-uz-Zaman; Mirza Wali
- House: Timurid
- Father: Humayun
- Mother: Mah Chuchak Begum
- Religion: Sunni Islam

Bakht-un-Nissa Begum (c. 1547 – 2 June 1608) was a Mughal princess and a daughter of the Mughal emperor Humayun. She was governor of Kabul from 1581 until her death.

== Birth ==
Bakht-un-Nissa Begum was born in 1547 in Badakhshan. Her mother was Mah Chuchak Begum. On the night of her birth Humayun had a dream, and it occurred to him that she be named Bakht-un-Nissa (Persian: بخت النساء, lit. 'fortunate among women'). Her siblings included Mirza Muhammad Hakim, Farrukh Fal Mirza, Sakina Banu Begum, and Amina Banu Begum.

== Marriages ==
=== Shah Abdul Ma'ali ===
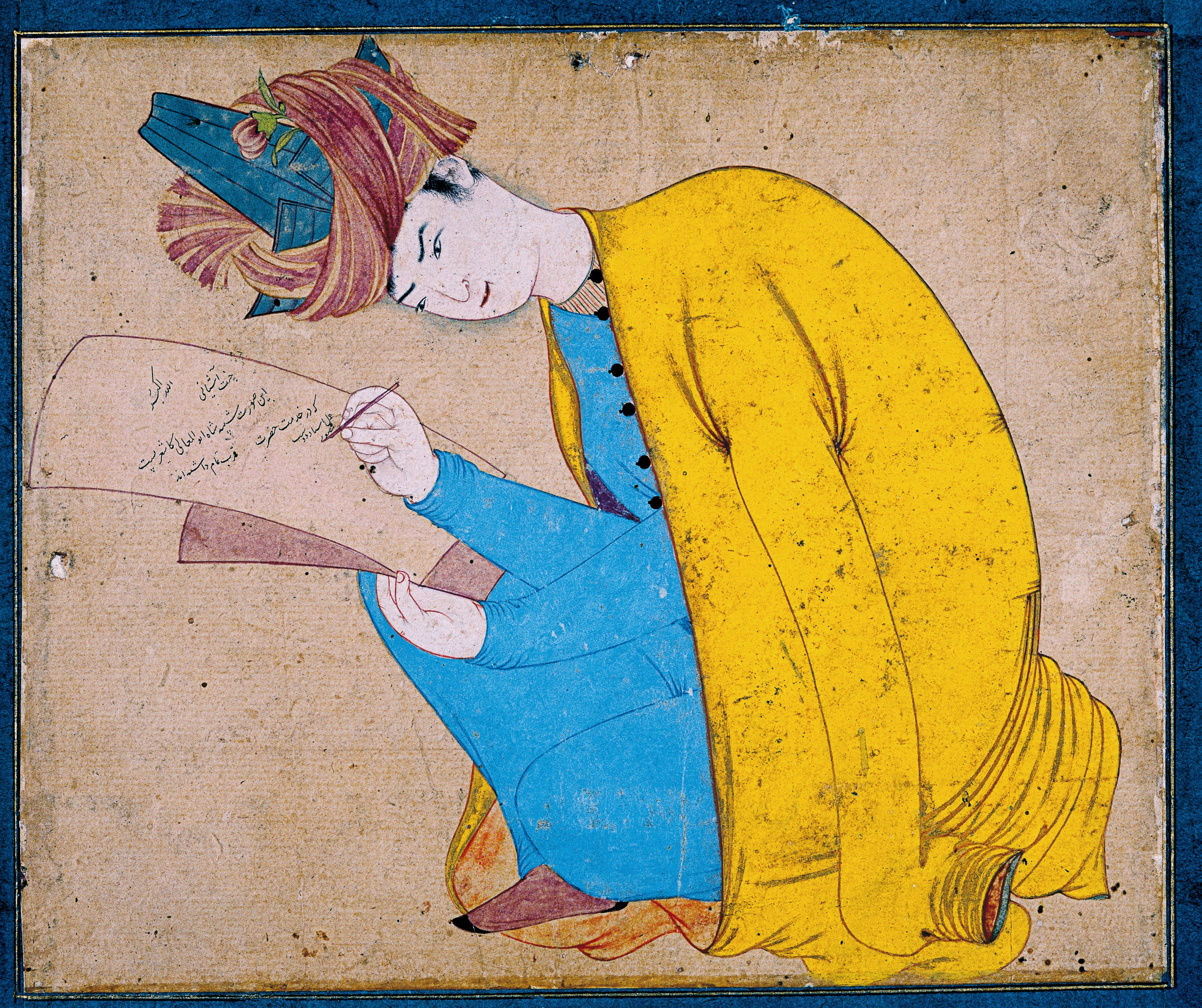
A Persian miniature of Shah Abu'l Ma‘ali, as a scholar, by Dust Muhammad, 1556–64.

During Mah Chuchak Begum's rule at Kabul, Shah Abu'l Ma'ali, who belonged to the family of the Sayyids of Termez, who had escaped from the prison at Lahore, arrived at Kabul and approached her for refuge. Mah Chuchak welcomed him, was generous to him and gave her daughter Bakht-un-Nissa Begum's hand in marriage to him. However, soon Abdul Ma'ali grew tired of the dominating and interfering ways of Mah Chuchak. He wanted Kabul for himself. So he killed Mah Chuchak in 1564. Hakim Mirza was rescued by Sulaiman Mirza of Badakshan, who defeated and killed Abdul Ma'ali and helped Mirza Hakim to keep his hold over Kabul.

=== Khawaja Hasan ===
After Abdul Ma'ali's death, Hakim Mirza married her to Khawaja Hasan Naqshbandi of Badakshan. With Hasan, she had two sons, Mirza Badi-uz-Zaman and Mirza Wali. After Hakim Mirza's death, Mirza Badi-uz-Zaman fled to Transoxania, where he died in exile. Bakht-un-Nissa Begum, and her son Mirza Wali joined the court, and Akbar did much to please her. In 1619, Jahangir married Mirza Wali to Bulaqi Begum, the daughter of Prince Daniyal Mirza, the son of Akbar.

== Governorship of Kabul ==
Her brother, Hakim Mirza was the governor of Kabul. In 1581, he rebelled in Kabul, and advanced to Lahore invading Punjab on the way. Here he was checked by Man Singh, who was the governor of Punjab at that time. Akbar declared war on him and himself went to Kabul. Mirza Hakim went to the hills. Akbar pardoned him, but the governorship of Kabul was now given to Bakht-un-Nissa Begum. Akbar also promised not to show any kindness to Hakim if he misbehaved in future. After Akbar's return from Kabul, Hakim got his old position, but all the official orders were issued in Bakht-un-Nissa's name.

== Death ==
Bakht-un-Nissa Begum died of consumption and hectic fever on 2 June 1608.

== Popular culture ==
=== Films and television ===
- In the 2023 ZEE5's web series Taj: Divided by Blood, she is portrayed by Shivani Tanksale.

== Annotations ==
1. She is also called by two other names, Najib-un-Nissa, and Fakhr-un-Nissa.

== Sources ==
- Branfoot, Crispin (30 June 2018). Portraiture in South Asia since the Mughals: Art, Representation and History. Bloomsbury Publishing. ISBN 978-1-83860-897-2.
