= Mah Chuchak Begum =

Mughal royal consort

- Born: Afghanistan
- Died: 28 March 1564; Bala Hissar, Kabul, Mughal Empire
- Burial: Kabul, Mughal Empire
- Spouse: Humayun (m. 1546; d. 1556)
- Issue: Mirza Farrukh Fal; Mirza Muhammad Hakim; Bakht-un-Nissa Begum; Sakina Banu Begum; Amina Banu Begum
- Religion: Sunni Islam

Mah Chuchak Begum (Pashto: ماه چوچک بېګم, meaning moon flower; died 28 March 1564) was a wife of the second Mughal emperor Humayun. She was an ambitious lady who threw out the Naib Subadar and ruled Kabul on her own, once leading her army in person and defeating at Jalalabad the Mughal general Munim Khan whom the Emperor Akbar had dispatched over Mah Chuchak's perceived transgression.

== Early years ==
Mah Chuchak Begum's parentage is not mentioned in any of the contemporary chronicles. She was the sister of Bairam Oghlan of Arghun and Faridun Khan Kabuli. Humayun married Mah Chuchak in 1546. She had two sons, Mirza Muhammad Hakim and Farrukh Fal Mirza, and three daughters, Bakht-un-Nissa Begum, Sakina Banu Begum, and Amina Banu Begum.

== As widow ==
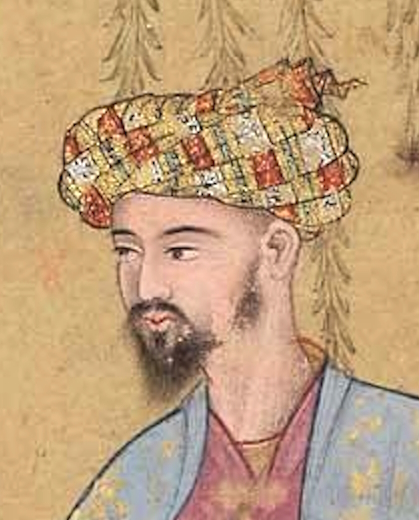
Portrait of Mirza Muhammad Hakim, a son of Mah Chuchak Begum with Humayun. Attributed to Aqa Riza, 1584-1590. Museum of Fine Arts, Boston, 14.609.

She was one of the Mughal ladies who caused a lot of trouble to Akbar during the initial phase of his reign. In 1554, Humayun nominated his son with her, Mirza Muhammad Hakim, then three years old, as the governor of Kabul under the charge of Munim Khan. In 1566, Akbar confirmed the appointment. Munim Khan returned to Akbar's court in 1561 and his son Ghani took his place. Mah Chuchak was politically ambitious. She was advised by Fazli Beg and his son Abdulfath, who hated Ghani Khan, to close the doors of Kabul, when Ghani Khan was once temporarily absent at Faliz. Ghani Khan, not finding adherents to oppose her, went to India. Mah Chuchak Begum then appointed Fazli Beg as Vakil and Abdulfath as Naib (regent), but being dissatisfied with them, she killed them both, at the advice of Shah Wali, one of her nobles. When Akbar heard of this, he sent Munim Khan with an army against Mah Chuchak. Mah Chuchak met him and defeated Munim Khan at Jalalabad. Mah Chuchak ruled Kabul with the help of three advisers, two of whom were killed earlier. Now, even the third one was killed. In their place came Haidar Qasim Kohbur, whom Mah Chuchak Begum had made Vakil. Munim fled to the Ghak'hars, and ashamed and hesitating he joined Akbar, who appointed him Commander at the fort of Agra.

Around this time a certain Shah Abul-Mali, who belonged to the family from the great Sayyids of Termez (present-day Uzbekistan), who had escaped from the prison at Lahore, arrived at Kabul and approached Mah Chuchak Begum for refuge. The Begum welcomed him, was generous to him and gave her daughter Bakht-un-Nissa Begum in marriage to him.

== Death and aftermath ==
Shah Abul Maali soon grew tired of the dominating and interfering ways of Mah Chuchak Begum. He wanted Kabul for himself. So, he killed Mah Chuchak and Haidar Qasim in 1564. Akbar's half-brother and Mah Chuchak's son Mirza Hakim was luckily rescued by Mirza Sulaiman of Badakshan, who defeated Abul Maali and helped Mirza Hakim keep his hold over Kabul. The activities of Mah Chuchak Begum and her political ambitions certainly proved to be a headache for Akbar and troubled him like a sore thumb, just when he was trying to consolidate his father's inherited, lost and finally gained empire in India. But he was soon freed of Mah Chuchak Begum and her ambitious ways.

== In popular culture ==
In 2013, a television series called Jodha Akbar aired on Zee TV, in which the role of Mah Chuchak Begum was played by actress Mita Vashisht.
