= Sher Mandal =

16th-century historic building

Coordinates: 28°36′31″N 77°14′42″E

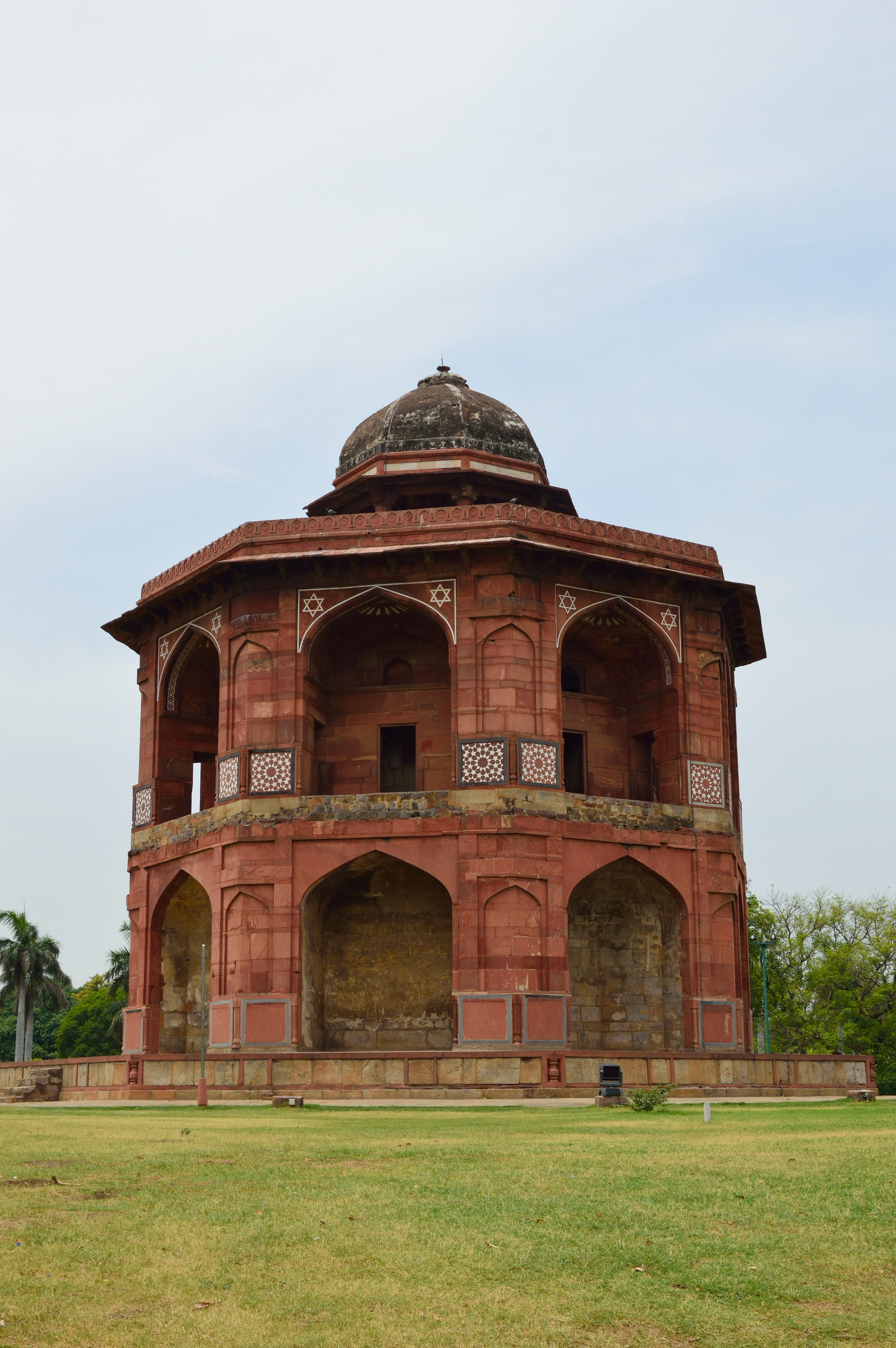
Sher Mandal

Sher Mandal (Sher Shah's Pavilion) is a 16th-century historic Library within the Purana Qila fort located in Delhi, India. Designed in a blend of Indo-islamic, Timurid and Persian architecture, it is the only surviving palace structure within the fort and has become a tourist attraction.

== Location ==
Sher Mandal is east of a hamam (Turkish royal bath) towards the southeastern end of Purana Qila, in Delhi, India. The highest point of the fort is occupied by this building.

== History ==
=== Death of Humayun ===
The Mughal emperor Humayun is believed to have used this building as his library. Whilst contemporary historical accounts do not discuss the details of Humayun's death, Abul Fazl, Nizamuddin Ahmad, Firishta and Badayuni, both of whom held distinguished positions at the royal court of Humayun's son Akbar, recorded the event.

Fazl wrote that, on 20 January 1556 (other sources give 24 January), Humayun had been on the roof of a recently fitted library to bless his subjects. He was expected to declare the promotions of various officers in an event which coincided with the rise of Venus, for which he had summoned his astronomers. Around evening, he began his descent and had made it only to the second step when he heard the Azaan (the Muslim call to prayer). Humayun purportedly sat on the steps to pray and, as he stood up, one of his legs became entangled with his robe, resulting his fall down the stairs. He received an injury to his temple and died one to three days later.

Nizamuddin, Mulla Ahmad, Firishta, Badauni et al. confirmed this version, albeit with slight variations. Seydi Ali Reis, who was there at the time of accident, noted the exact same events and described the building as the Castle of Pleasure.

=== Dispute about construction ===
The roles played by Sher Shah Suri and Humayun in the construction of the building (and the fort) are disputed.

Sher Mandal was previously believed to have been built by Suri ruler Sher Shah Suri in 1541 as a pleasure resort. The name was first used by the historian Abdullah, author of Tarikh-i Da’udi, who described it as being supposedly left incomplete by Sher Shah. Catherine Asher, a specialist in Indian and Islamic art forms, and others had initially posited that these passages allowed the Purana Qil'a to be equated with Sher-garh and that the Sher Mandal was constructed by Sher Shah. Historian Percival Spear deems it to have been constructed by Sher Shah.

However, others have noted a lack of corresponding archaeological and literary evidence to assert the linkage or connect the Qal’a-i Kuhna masjid with Sher Shah's mosque or the pavilion at the Purana Qil'a to be Sher Mandal. Contemporaneous literary descriptions of the monuments at the palace do not support the idea that Sher Shah destroyed (and replaced) Din-panah, as implied by the theories associating Sher-garh with the Purana Qil'a. Abu’l Fazl and Badaoni explicitly mention that Sher Shah established an extensive city between the fortress of Din-panah, which Muhammad Humayun Padshah constructed, and Firozabad. Anthony Monserrate, who visited Delhi during the early 1580s, also recorded the existence of Din-panah. Furthermore, the Qal’a-i Kuhna masjid nor the pavilion resemble any of the buildings of Sher Shah. The rectangular plan of the mosque, for instance, with its five bays, inset colonettes and octagonal corner towers, is almost identical to the mosque of Jamali-Kamali, which was begun during the reign of Babur. The double-story pavilion on the other hand, with its octagonal plan, rectangular decorative panels and large chhatri, closely resembles a number of palaces described by Khwandamir and Gulbadam Begam in their accounts of Humayun's architecture. Most importantly, Badayuni, in his chronicle of Humayun's death, prominently mentions that the building was constructed by Humayun himself. Ram Nath points to the architectural designs at Sher Mandal as evidence of a homogeneous construction that is consistent with Humayan's style.

=== Dispute about usage ===
Stephen Carr, writing in the state gazetteer of 1876, said Sher Madal was not a palace or a flank tower. Ram Nath said the structure had nonresemblance to an unfinished palace, as well as a lacking ofshelves, niches or any other feature that might have justified its use as a library. Nath, in light of its geographical position and circumstantial literary corpus, said that it was used as an astronomical observatory and named Saur Mandal, which evolved into its current name based on the mistaken belief that Sher Shah had destroyed the entire fort-town.

== Architecture ==
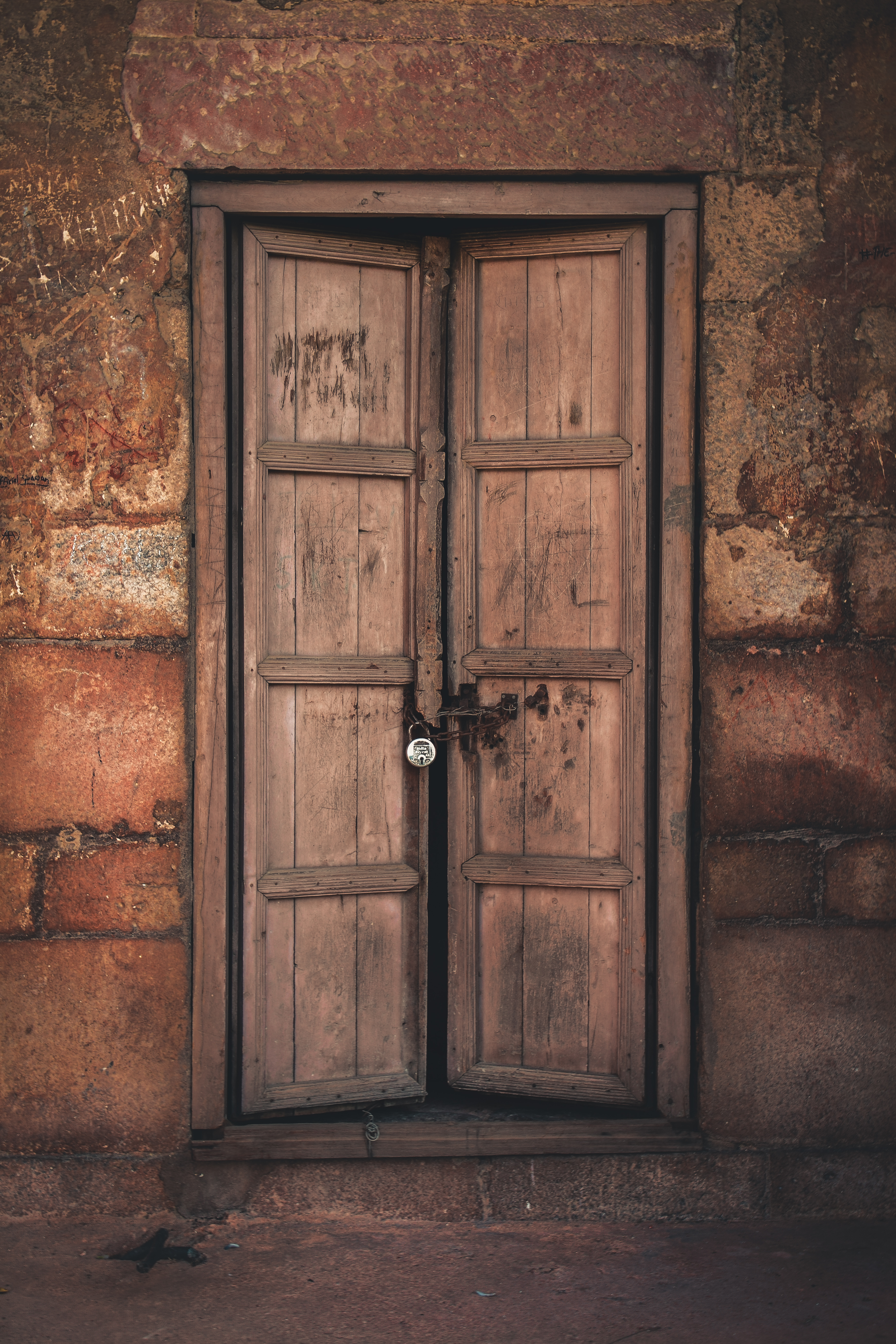
Gate of Sher Mandal in 2022

The building is a two-storey octagonal structure (about 60 feet (18 m) in height) constructed of red sandstone. Two extremely steep, narrow, and irregular granite staircases, of about eighteen steps each run along the northern and southern walls connecting the two floors. There is a single staircase joining the upper floor with the terrace. Between the two floors there is a band of black slate.

The upper storey is protected by small chhajjas (overhanging roofs), above which are cornices, while the chhajjas of the first storey have been destroyed over time. The middle of the terrace contains a spacious octagonal chhatri, with each pillar separated by a distance of 2.64 metres (8.7 ft). The dados of this storey contain a 12-pointed star, which was considered auspicious by Humayun, despite it being an astronomical numeral.

Both storeys have eight alcoves, one on each side; in the lower storey, they are alternately square and semi-octagonal in shape, whilst those of the upper storey are deeper and rectangular in shape. Marbled satkona symbols are present on each exterior spandrel of the upper arches of the alcove, while the intrados of the arches are etched with marble-inlaid motifs of a 12-petaled flower with a 12-pointed star.

There exists a cruciform chamber in the upper storey—a single square-shaped room at the centre, which opens out into four smaller rooms aligned with four of the alcoves. These arms in turn are linked to form an ambulatory. The chamber has semi-vaulted soffits on the sides supporting the four arches and a vaulted ceiling. The interiors bear exquisite stalactite designs and other decorations of glazed tiles and incised stucco. The walls are paneled with encaustic tiles to a height of about three feet from the floor. The rest of the wall, up to the ceiling, is ornamented with paintings of flowers and fancy patterns. The interior of the arches are scantily ornamented with marble.

The lower storey is completely enclosed such that the interior is inaccessible. Nath presumes that it corresponds to a temporary burial site of Humayan, mentioned across contemporary texts. Although the chamber was initially open, it was later closed out of respect, when his corpse was moved to a newly commissioned tomb about two years after his death.

== Tourism ==
The upper storey of Sher Mandal is restricted to visitors.
