= Taj-e Haydari =

Historic Iranian headdress

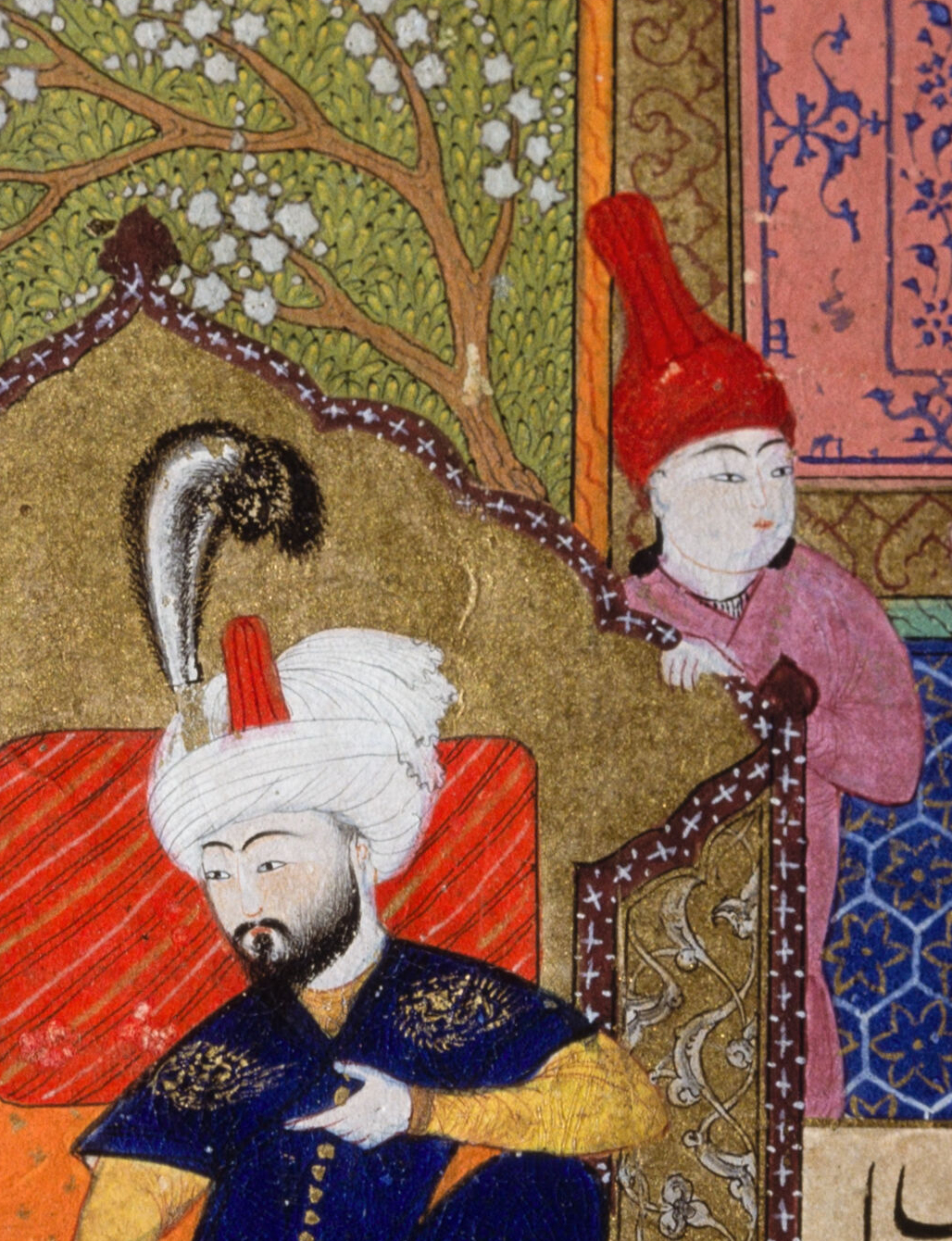
Taj-e Haydari, with and without turban. Dastan-i Jamal u Jalal, 1502–1505, Tabriz (Uppsala University Library, O Nova 2)

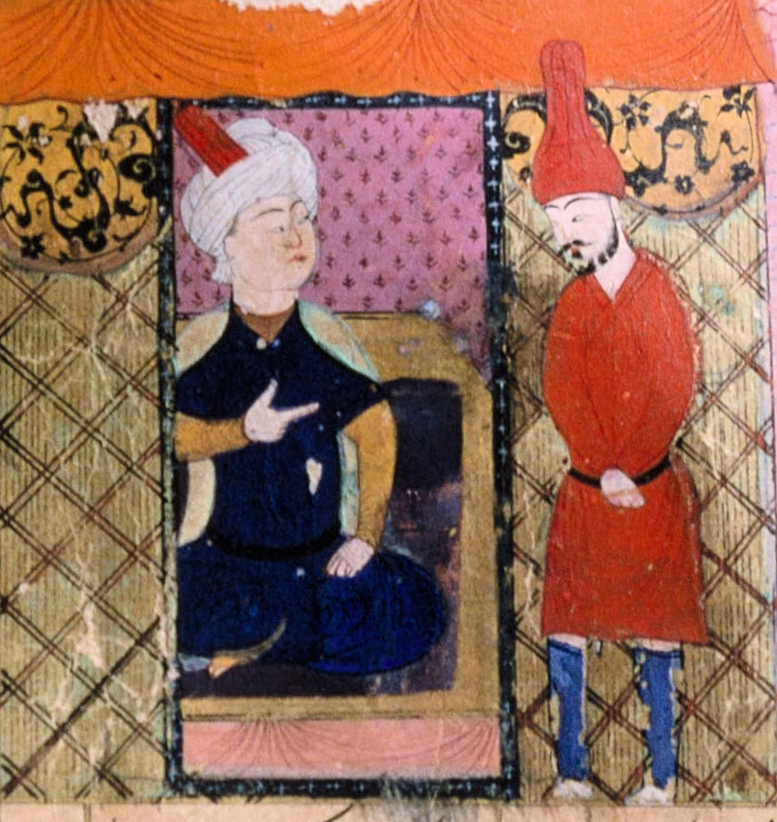
Jalal and his servant Failasuf (f.24b detail). Taj-e Haydari, with and without turban. Dastan-i Jamal u Jalal, 1502–1505, Tabriz (Uppsala University Library, O Nova 2)

The Taj-e Haydari (Persian: تاج حیدر, lit. 'Haydar's Crown'), was a type of headdress introduced circa 1501–1502 during the early Safavid era in Iran, when the future Shah Ismail captured Tabriz. The headdress consisted of a cap with a tall red projection, often wrapped in a white turban around its base. The tall red projection has 12 sides, in memory of the twelve Shiite imams (a symbol of Twelver Shi'ism), and may be complemented by a red plume in the center.

The headdress was originally invented by, and named after Shaykh Haydar (1456–1488), father of Ismail I, founder of the Safavid dynasty. According to a legend, Haydar saw the new headdress in a dream.

The Taj-e Haydari became a rallying sign for the new dynasty, and is also a chronological marker for artistic works of the period. The Taj-e Haydari is the reason why the partisans of the Safavids were called "Qizil bash" ("Red head") by the Turks.

This headgear differed from the Turkman taqiya, which consisted in a kolah conical cap with a turban. The Mughal Tāj-i 'Izzat may also have been created in response to the Taj-e Haydari.
