= Tāj-i 'Izzat =

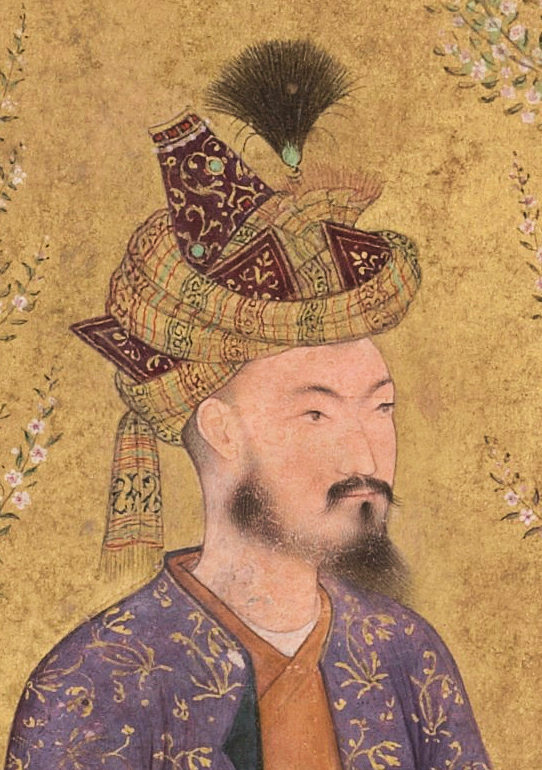
Portrait of Humayun, wearing the Tāj-i 'Izzat, in the Late Shah Jahan Album, painted c. 1640. Smithsonian Collections.

The Tāj-i 'Izzat ("Crown of Power and Glory") was a particular type of Mughal Empire headdress, characteristic of the court of Humayun (ruled 1530-1540 and 1555-1556), son and successor of Babur, and invented by Humayun himself.

== History ==
The headdress was created by Humayun in 1532 (939 AH), two years after his first accession as Mughal Emperor. The Tāj-i 'Izzat was discontinued early in the reign of his son Akbar I.

In creating the Tāj-i 'Izzat, it is thought that Humayun probably tried to emulate and rival the Persian Taj-i Haydari, created by the Safavids as a symbol of their Sufi organization. The creation of the Tāj-i 'Izzat may have been a reaction to Babur's allegiance to the Safavids, and part of Humayun's attempt to create a spiritual system that could rival that of the Safavids.

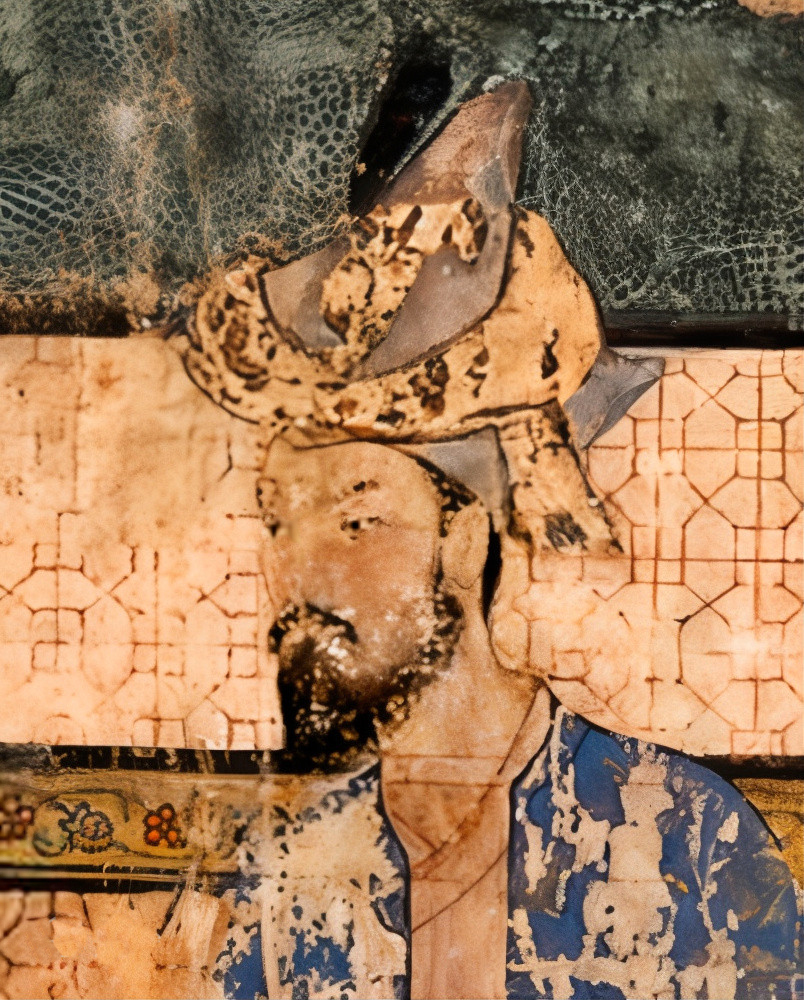
Contemporary life-time portrait of Humayun, painted in Kabul, in 1550-55

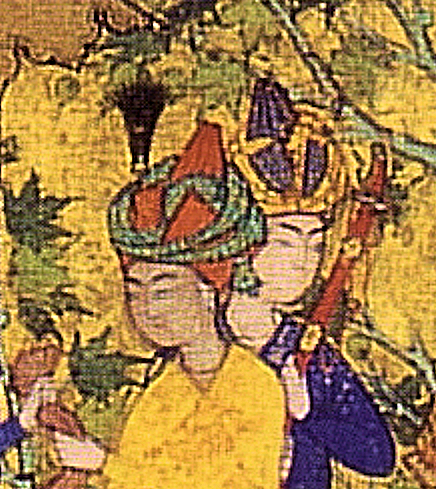
Humayun attendants, with Tāj-i 'Izzat headdress, Kabul in 1550-55

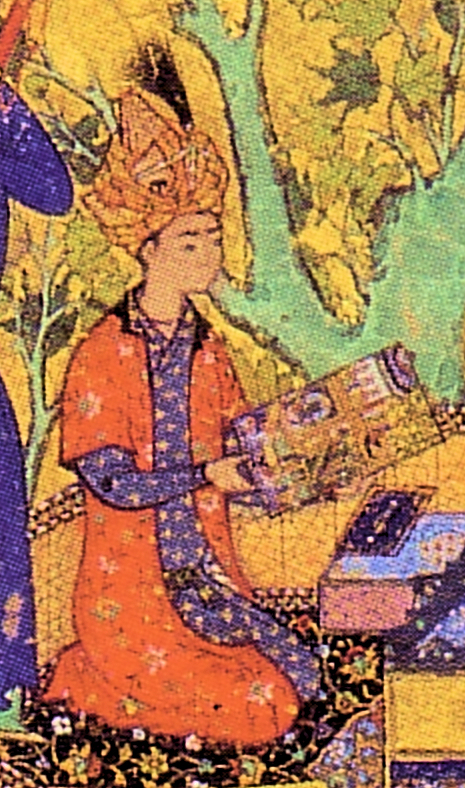
Contemporary portrait of the young Akbar, son of Humayun, wearing the Tāj-i 'Izzat
