= Aqā Rizā Haravi =

Persian painter active at the Mughal court (1580–1620)

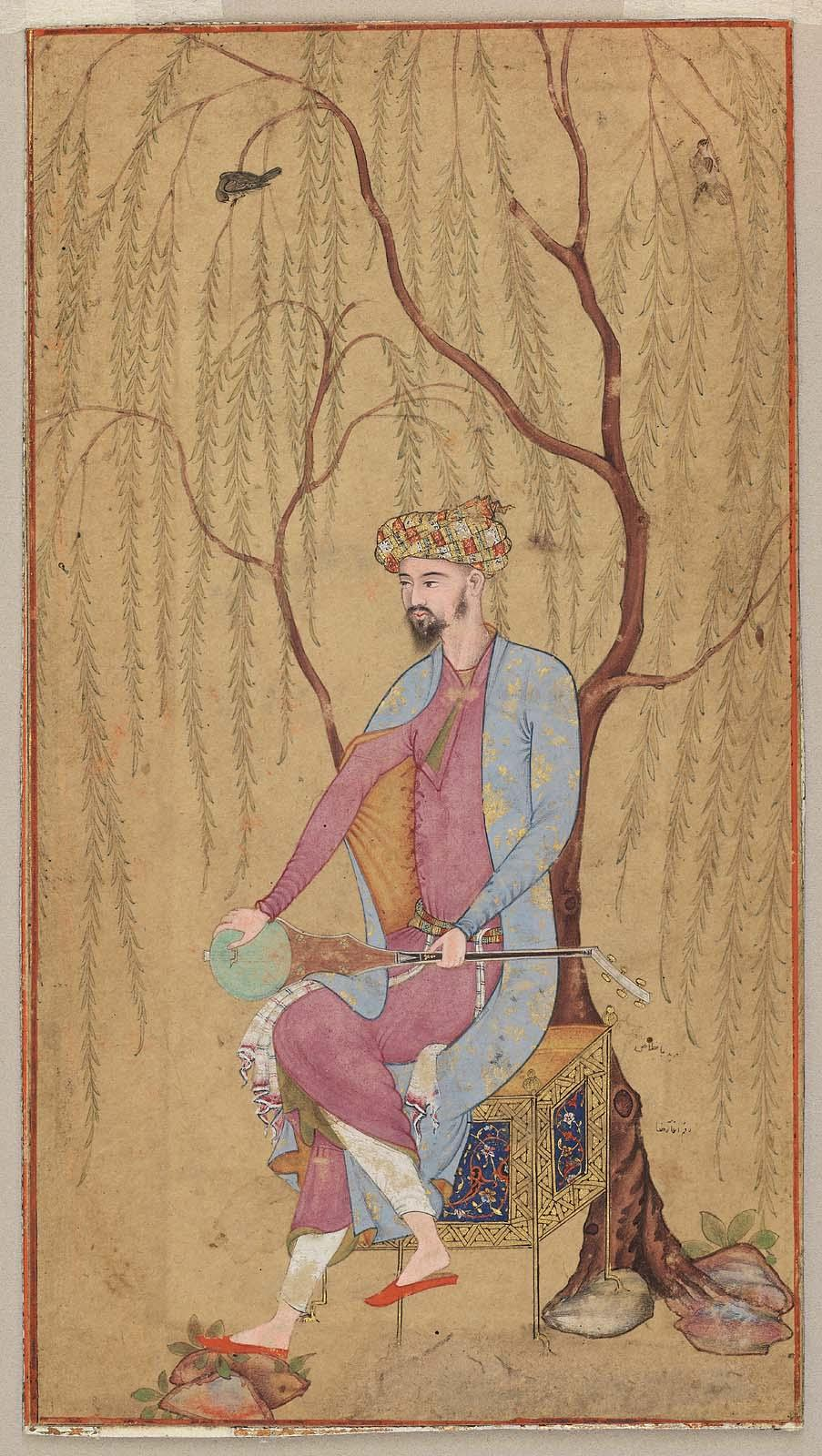
Portrait of Mirza Muhammad Hakim. Attributed to Aqa Riza (Persian, active in India about 1580–1620) Indian, Mughal period 1584–1590. Possibly Lahore, Northern India or Pakistan. MFA Boston, 14.609.

Aqa Riza, also Aqā Rizā Haravi (Persian: آقا رضا هروی), was a Persian artist active in India at the Mughal court, about 1580–1620. He is said to have been from Khorasan. He may have been from Herat (modern Afghanistan), as suggested by his surname "Haravi".

He is not to be confused with Reza Abbasi, a Persian artist who also used the same name "Aqa Reza".

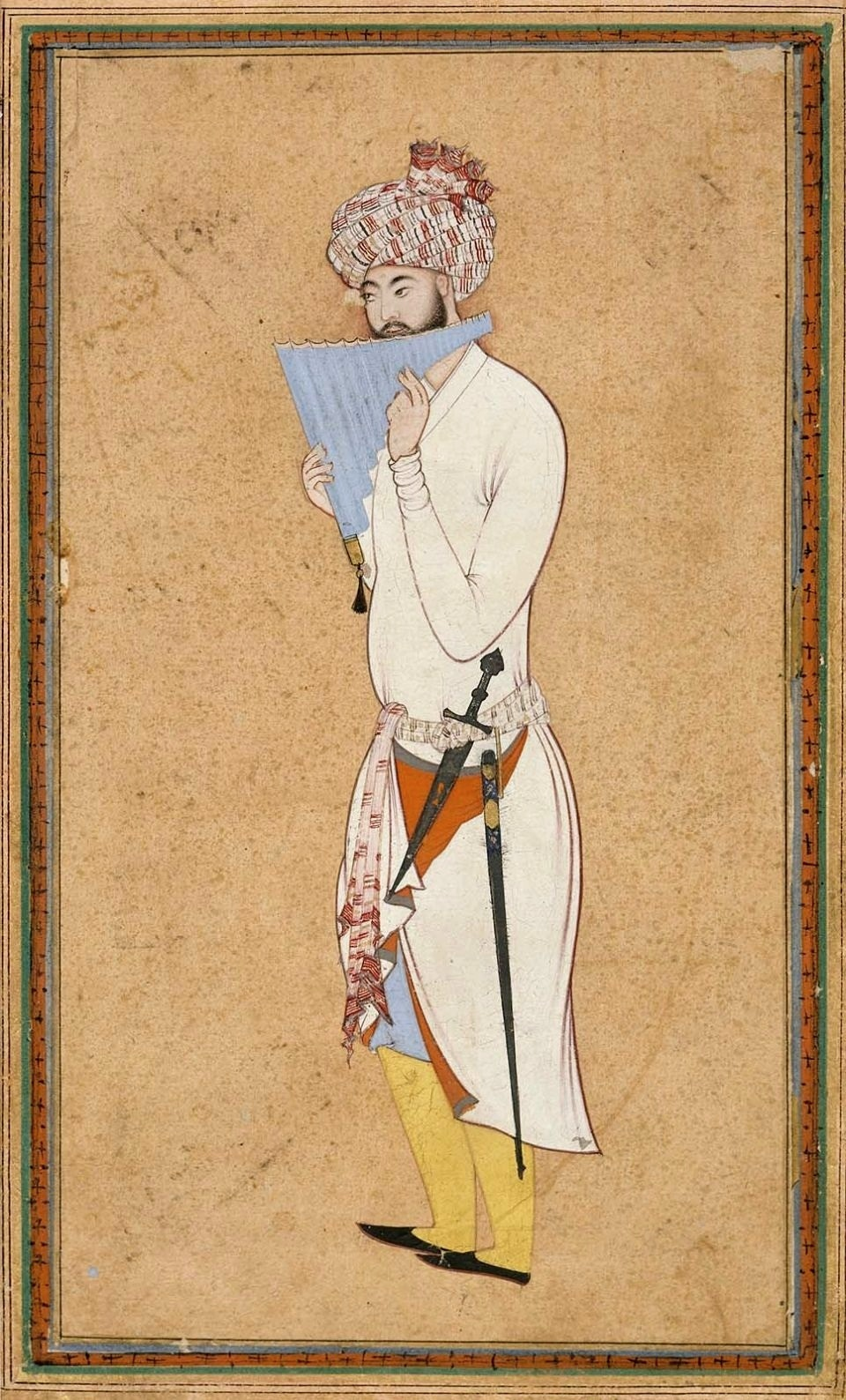
Man Playing Panpipes. ca. 1595

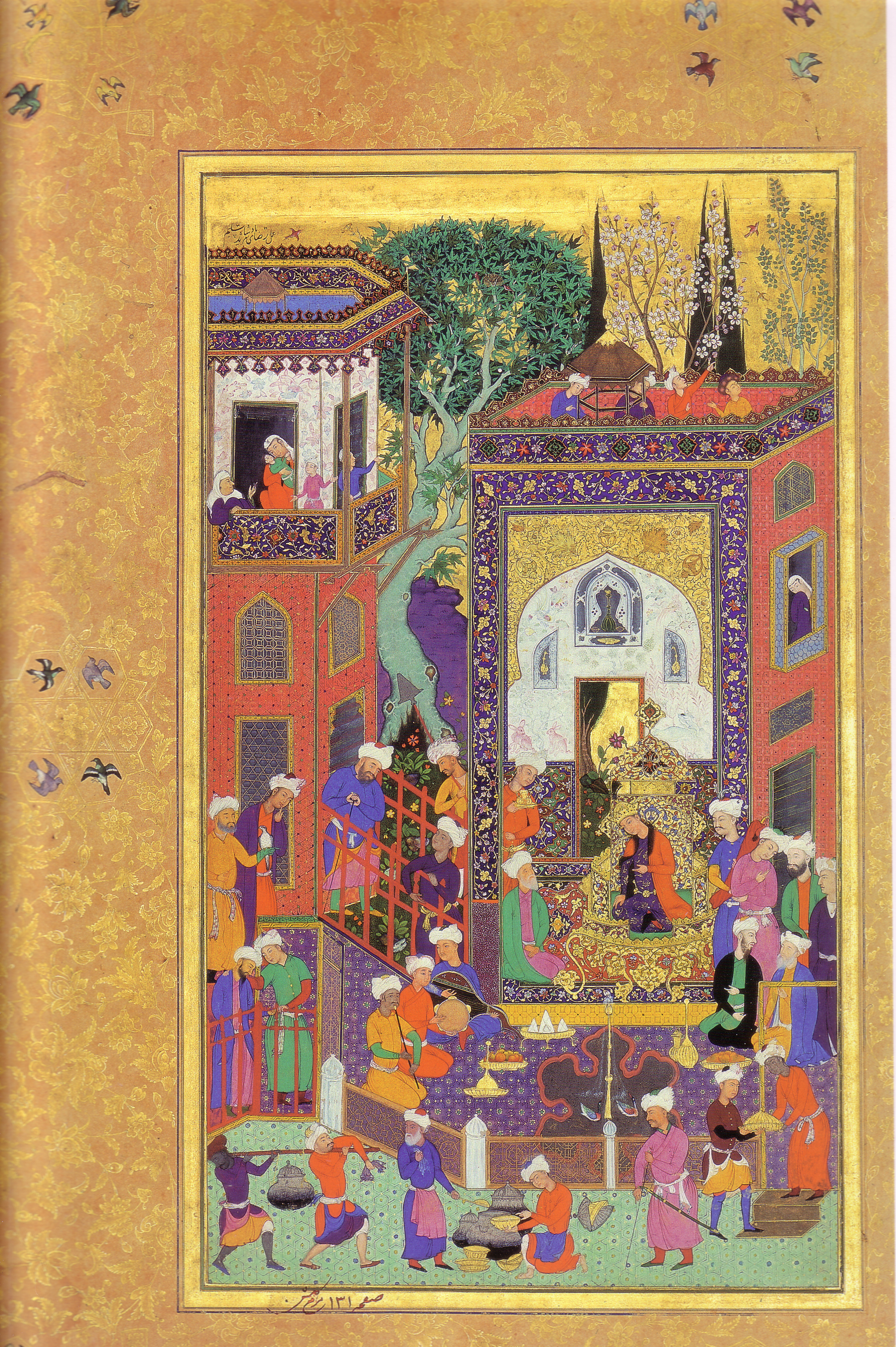
Muraqqa-e Golshan

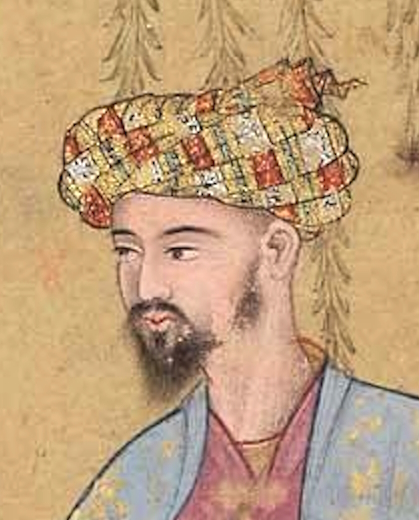
Portrait of Mirza Muhammad Hakim (detail)
