= Mirza Muhammad Hakim =

Mirza Hakim
- Shahzada of Mughal Empire
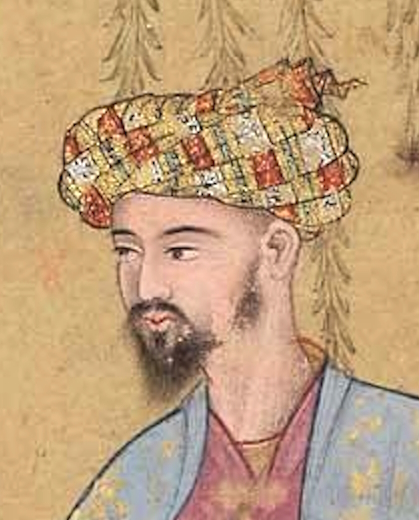
- Portrait of Mirza Muhammad Hakim. Attributed to Aqa Riza (Persian, active in India about 1580–1620). Indian, Mughal period 1584-1590, possibly painted in Lahore, Northern India or Pakistan. Museum of Fine Arts, Boston, 14.609.

Subahdar of Kabul
- Reign: 23 October 1575 – 1580
- Coronation: Akbar I
- Predecessor: Munim Khan
- Successor: Man Singh I
- Born: 29 April 1553; Kabul, Mughal Empire (modern-day Afghanistan)
- Died: 10 October 1585 (aged 32); Mughal Empire
- Burial: Gardens of Babur, Kabul, Afghanistan
- Spouse: Daughter of Sulaiman Shah Mirza of Badakhshan
- Issue: Afrasiyab Mirza; Qaiqubad Mirza; Kabuli Begum
Names
- Mirza Muhammad Hakim ibn Mirza Nasir-ud-Din Muhammad Humayun
- House: Mughal dynasty
- Dynasty: Timurid dynasty
- Father: Humayun
- Mother: Mah Chuchak Begum
- Religion: Sunni Islam (Hanafi)

Shahzada Mirza Muhammad Hakim (29 April 1553 – 10 October 1585), sometimes known simply as Mirza Hakim, was the third son of the Mughal emperor Humayun. He ruled Kabul in Afghanistan, and often conflicted with his elder brother, Emperor Akbar, who he later on mended ways with. He was the son of Mah Chuchak Begum. Mirza Hakim was the ruler of Kabul, and was practically independent, although supposed to owe fealty to the Mughal emperor.

== Invasion of Afghanistan ==
As per the Tabakat-i-Akbari of Nizamuddin Ahmad, Mughal Emperor Akbar had dispatched Mirza Hakim, who was a staunch adherent of the missionary-minded Naqshbandi Sufi order, against the "infidels" of Katawar in 1582. Hakim was a semi-independent governor of Kabul. The Sifat-nama-yi Darviš Muhammad Hān-i Ğāzī of Kadi Muhammad Salim who accompanied the expedition mentions its details. The Sifat-nama gives Mirza Muhammad Hakim the epithet of Darviš Khan Gazi.

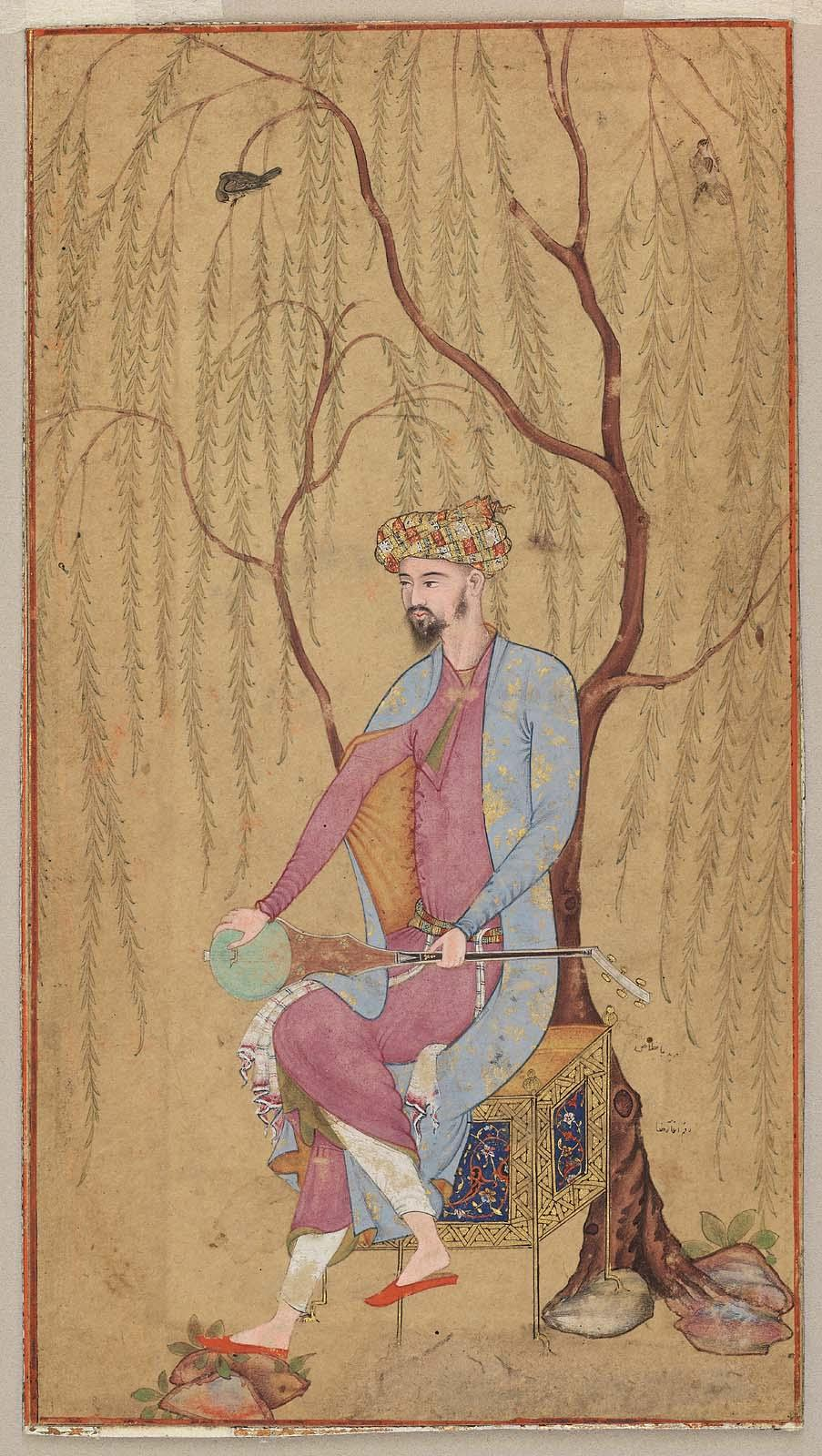
Portrait of Mirza Muhammad Hakim. Attributed to Aqa Riza (Persian, active in India about 1580–1620). Indian, Mughal period 1584-1590, possibly painted in Lahore, Northern India or Pakistan. Museum of Fine Arts, Boston, 14.609.

Mirza Muhammad Darvish Khan Gazi's religious crusade fought its way from Laghman to Alishang, and is stated to have conquered and converted residents of 66 valleys to Islam. After conquering Tajau and Nijrau valleys in Panjshir area, the crusaders established a fort at Islamabad at the confluence of the Alishang and Alingar rivers. They continued the raid up to Alishang and made their last effort against the non-Muslims of Alingar, fighting up to Mangu, the modern border between Pashai and Ashkun-speaking areas of Hindu Kush.

== Rebellion ==
Akhlaq-i-Hakimi written by his secretary confirmed the commitment of Kabul's kingdom to the supremacy of Islam and Muslims, unlike the court of Akbar which inched towards tolerating difference and protection of people of all faiths. He also swore fealty to Babur while Akbar had embraced Humayun. By presenting himself as a contrast to Akbar, he became a focus of anti-Akbar rebels who requested him to invade and dethrone Akbar in 1566 and 1581. His invasion however met with little success as only a few north Indians supported him.

Mirza Hakim made a plea to Akbar's Central Asian officers to not help him occupy Kabul and instead attack the Indians in the Mughal army. His efforts however failed and Kabul was occupied. Mirza Hakim was defeated in 1582 and his prime minister Khwaja Hasan Naqshbandi was exiled by Akbar. After his death in 1585 due to alcohol poisoning, Akbar had his sons expelled to India and ended his princely appanage.

== Popular culture ==
=== Films and television ===
- In the 2018 historical drama series Dastaan-E-Mohabbat Salim Anarkali aired on Colors TV, he is portrayed by Chirag Jani.
- In the 2023 ZEE5's web series Taj: Divided by Blood, he is portrayed by Actor Rahul Bose.
