= Mughal conquest of Sylhet =

Mughal campaign in eastern Bengal (1611-1612)

- Part of Mughal conquest of Bengal
Date	October 1611 – April 1612
Location	Sylhet, present day Bangladesh
Result	Mughal victory
Territorial changes	Bokainagar, Matang, Taraf, Baniachang, Sylhet annexed to the Mughal Empire

Belligerents
Mughal Empire; Bengal Subah	Baro-Bhuyan's of Sylhet; Supported by: Dimasa Kingdom

Commanders and leaders
Islam Khan I Commanders: Shaikh Kamal; Shaikh Abdul Wahid; Mirza Nathan (WIA); Mahmud Khan; Bahadur Ghazi; Islam Quli; Raja Ray; Haji Shamsuddin Baghdadi †; Qurban Ali; Shuja'at Khan; Ihtimam Khan; Sona Ghazi; Mutaqid Khan; Sayyid Adam †; Shaikh Achha †; Mirza Qasim Beg; Iftikhar Khan †; Kishwar Khan †; Shaikh Qasim; Mubariz Khan; Tuqmuq Khan; Mirak Bahadur Jalair; Mir Abdur Razzaq; Qaza Khan; Hatim Beg; Mirza Kachkana; Mirza Beg Aymaq; Khwaja Asl; Adil Beg	Bayazid of Sylhet (surrendered); Khwaja Usman (DOW) Commanders: Nasir Khan; Dariya Khan; Khwaja Mahli; Khwaja Mumriz; Wali Mandu-Khel; Pahlwan †; Khwaja Wali; Shir-i-Maydan; Khwaja Ibrahim; Khwaja Daud; Khwaja Yaqub; Asad Khan; Jalal Khan; Nasir Khan

Strength
Islam Khan: 1,000 cavalry 5,000 musketeers 300 elephants 300 or 3,000 boats Shuja'at Khan: 1500 cavalry 4,000 musketeers Shaikh Kamal: 1,000 cavalry 4,000 musketeers 100 elephants	5,000 or 5,200 cavalry (Note: Khwaja Usman: 2,000 cavalry, Khwaja Wali: 1,000 cavalry, Shir-i-Maydan: 700 cavalry, Others: 1,500 cavalry. Total 5,200 cavalry according to Mirza Nathan.); 10,000 infantry (Note: Khwaja Usman: 5,000 infantry, Khwaja Wali: 2,000 infantry, Shir-i-Maydan: 1,000 infantry, Others: 2,000 infantry. Total 10,000 infantry according to Mirza Nathan.); 140 or 150 elephants (Note: Khwaja Usman: 40 elephants, Khwaja Wali: 30 elephants, Shir-i-Maydan: 20 elephants, Others: 50 elephants. Total 150 elephants according to Mirza Nathan)

Casualties and losses
Heavy	Heavy

The Mughal conquest of Sylhet occurred in 1611–1612 during the reign of Emperor Jahangir (r. 1605–1627), when two Mughal forces under Shuja'at Khan and Shaikh Kamal dispatched by Subahdar Islam Khan I simultaneously launched operations against key Afghan leaders Khwaja Usman of Bokainagar and Bayazid Karrani of Sylhet. After Usman's defeat followed by Bayazid's submission, Sylhet and its territories within were formally annexed to the Bengal Subah.

In October 1611, Islam Khan initiated a combined land and naval offensive from Dhaka under commanders Shaikh Kamal, Shaikh Abdul Wahid, and Mirza Nathan. Khwaja Usman was took shelter into his principal fortress at Bokainagar. Retreating into Sylhet, Usman fortified position at Uhar alongside local Afghan ruler Bayazid Karrani. The imperial campaign culminated on 12 March 1612 at the Battle of Daulambapur, where despite early Afghan breakthroughs, Usman was mortally wounded by a musket shot. His death caused a complete collapse of Afghan forces, leading to the capitulation of his brothers and kinsmen. Bayazid Karrani soon submitted leading to the full administrative annexation of Sylhet into the Bengal Subah.

== Background ==
Following the collapse of Karrani rule in Bengal, the region splintered into semi-independent territories held by Afghan chieftains and local zamindars, forming the Baro-Bhuyans confederacy that fiercely resisted Mughal authority.

Khwaja Usman, the last Baro-Bhuyan was the most formidable Mughal opponent in Bengal. Following Odisha campaign by Man Singh I in 1593, Usman was granted fiefs in Faridpur. Soon Man Singh's cancellation of their grants made Usman to revolt and establish himself in the Mymensingh District. He allied with Isa Khan and established his stronghold at Bokainagar in eastern Mymensingh, with fortified posts at Hasanpur and Egarasindur on the Brahmaputra's eastern bank, the frontier line with Mughal territory. He repeatedly fought Raja Man Singh alongside Isa Khan, later allied with Isa's son Musa Khan in resisting Mughal campaigns, and maintained close ties with Afghan leaders Bayazid Karrani of Sylhet and Anwar Khan of Baniachong. After Musa Khan's submission Islam Khan sent envoy to Usman to acknowledge the Mughals as suzerain. Usman's refusal prompted Islam Khan to carry expedition against him. In 1605, following Akbar's death, Usman Khan mastered 20,000 followers and declared himself independent. He also conquered the kingdom of Subid-Narayan in the Ita pargana in present day Kamalganj Upazila.

== Conquest ==
=== Early conquests ===
In October 1611, Islam Khan led an army consisted of 1,000 cavalry, 5,000 musketeers, 300 elephants and 300 or 3000 war boats, besides the entire navy of Musa Khan and other zamindars. The Mughal forces under Islam Khan's trusted officers, (Note: According to Baharistan-i-Ghaibi, the other notable officers participated in the expedition were Shaykh ‘Abdu’l-Wahid, Shaykh Kanjal, Qaza Khan alias Mir Shairf Gulabi, Mubariz Khan, Ihtimam Khan, Tuqmaq Khan, Mirak Bahadur Jala’ir, Mirza Nathan, son of Ihtimam Khan, Mirza Kazim Beg, Hatim Beg, Mirza Kachkana, son of Mirza Yusuf Khan, ‘Abdu’r-Razzaq Shirazi, Mirza Quli, Mirza Beg Aymaq, Khuja ‘Asl, and ‘Adil Beg) Shaikh Kamal and Shaikh Abdul Wahid, advanced with the main land army from Dhaka to Hasanpur, situated south of Bokainagar and established camp there. Ihtimam Khan, commanding the fleet, and Mirza Nathan later joined the land army via Egarosindur. Due to seasonal flood the combined land-naval assault on Bokainagar failed. With the naval component unfeasible, Islam Khan shifted to a land-based attack. Under Islam Khan's orders, Shaikh Kamal and Abdul Wahid marched from Hasanpur to Bokainagar, while Ghiyas Khan stayed at Shah Bandar with the entire fleet, ready for any emergency. Hearing Islam Khan's campaign against Khwaja Usman, Anwar Khan of Baniachang voluntarily surrendered to the Mughals. Anwar was allowed to retain his territory and ordered to march with his fleet against Usman. At Egarosindur he entered into a plot with imperial officers Mahmud Khan, Bahadur Ghazi, Islam Quli and Raja Ray against Islam Khan. The conspiracy failed before it could be carried out. Anwar subsequently fled to Baniachang. Islam Khan dispatched Raj Satrajit and Mubariz Khan against Anwar. The superior Mughal forces under Islam Khan quickly overwhelmed Afghan resistance, leading to divisions within Khwaja Usman's ranks. Two Afghan chiefs, Nasir Khan and Dariya Khan of Tajpur, defected to join the imperial side. Alarmed by these desertions and fearing further losses, Usman evacuated Bokainagar and withdrew to Sylhet, seeking refuge with Bayazid Karrani.

By the end of November 1611, the imperial army captured the fort of Bokainagar. Islam Khan then carried out campaigns against Khwaja Mahli and Khwaja Mumriz of Taraf, Pahlwan, the zamindar of Matang as well as Anwar Khan. Anwar Khan who fled to Baniachang offered naval battle to Raja Satrajit. Failing to stand against the mighty army he sued peace. Islam Khan then sent Haji Shamsuddin Baghdadi with a strong force against the Afghan zamindars of Matang and Taraf. First Haji Shamsuddin captured the fort of Taraf after heavy fighting. Next he marched against Matang. Pahlwan deciding to fight, charged upon Haji Shamsuddin and killing him in the encounter. Shamsuddin's adopted son Qurban Ali gathered the troops and made a counterattack upon Pahlwan, killing him in the process. Thus, both Taraf and Matang were annexed to the Mughal Empire.

=== War with Khwaja Usman ===
In January 1612, Islam Khan renewed his campaign against Usman. He simultaneously directed campaign against Usman in Uhar (Note: Identified Patanushar, in Moulvibazar District) and Bayazid in Sylhet. A force was composed under Shuja'at Khan consisted of large cavalry and infantry, including 500 picked cavalries of Islam Khan and 4,000 musketeers while fleet and war-boats under Ihtimam Khan and Sona Ghazi zamindar of Sarail respectively. Shaikh Kamal with 1,000 picked cavalries of Islam Khan, 4,000 musketeers, 100 elephants and entire fleet seized from Musa Khan, was given the command of the expedition against Bayazid. After long marching Shuja'at Khan finally reached at fort of Taraf. The forces against Bayazid also had generals like Mubariz Khan, Tuqmuq Khan, Mirak Bahadur Jalair and Mir Abdur Razzaq.

==== Battle of Daulambapur ====
On 4 February 1612, the Mughal imperial forces formed their battle array with Shuja'at Khan commanding the centre, assisted by Mutaqid Khan and Ihtimam Khan; the van was led by Mirza Nathan with support from Sayyid Adam, Shaikh Achha, Mirza Qasim, and Sona Ghazi; the right wing was entrusted to Iftikhar Khan, the left wing to Kishwar Khan, and the advance reserve to Shaikh Qasim. Islam Khan sent Abdus Salam to Shuja'at Khan with 1000 cavalry as reinforcement. Usman hearing the Mughal advance marched from his capital with a large army. He personally led the centre with 2,000 picked cavalry, 5,000 infantry, and 40 war-elephants; Khwaja Wali commanded the left wing with 1,000 cavalry, 2,000 infantry, and 30 elephants; Shir-i-Maydan held the right wing with 700 cavalry, 1,000 infantry, and 20 elephants; the van was entrusted to Khwaja Malhi, Khwaja Ibrahim, and Khwaja Daud with 1,500 cavalry, 2,000 infantry, and 50 elephants. According to Mirza Nathan, the Afghan army had about 5,000 cavalry, 10,000 infantry and 150 elephants. On 12 March 1612, a decisive battle unfolded at Daulambapur (Note: The place called by Nathan Daulambapur, probably Daulatpur, about eight miles west of Moulvibazar.) between the Mughal imperial forces and Afghan forces led by Khwaja Usman. The Mughals began with a false alarm that disrupted their vanguard, leading to chaos. The Afghans exploited this, defeating the imperial right wing and killing commander Iftikhar Khan, while also crushing the left wing and killing Kishwar Khan and officer Sayyid Adam. The Mughal vanguard commander Mirza Nathan was severely wounded, and the imperial center under Shuja'at Khan was broken. Mirza Nathan mistakenly killed his own ally Shaikh Achha in the chaotic conflict. Afghan victory seemed assured until Mughal horseman Shaikh 'Abdul Jalil shot Khwaja Usman through the eye, killing him. Though Usman killed his attacker, he died from the wound, and the Afghans, losing their leader, abandoned the field. The battle of Daulambapur ended in a dramatic reversal, with the Afghans fleeing despite their earlier dominance. The Afghans took Usman's dead body to Uhar and buried in a hidden tomb and his wives, daughters, except one married to Daud were put to death and also buried beside him.

On 4 March 1612, Khwaja Wali, Khawaja Mahli, Khwaja Ibrahim, Khwaja Daud, Khwaja Mumriz, Khwaja Yaqub, the minister Wali Mandu-Khel, other chiefs like Asad Khan, Jalal Khan, Nasir Khan, Usman's brothers, sons and other Afghan notables totalling 400 men, submitted and were accepted by Shuja'at Khan.

=== Conquest of Sylhet ===
Islam Khan reinforced Shaikh Kamal with Bihar troops and supplies to proceed against Bayazid in Sylhet. Shaikh Kamal reached the Surma River near fort of Sylhet and began devastating raids to force submission. Bayazid dispatched his brother Ya'qub at the head of a large number of Afghan chiefs to build a fort check the invaders. Raja Satrajit and others were ordered to make a fort opposite to that of Ya'qub. Satrajit crossed the Surma River and captured the fort after a week of fighting. Raja of Kachar strengthened Bayazid and Ya'qub with a large force. Raja Satrajit could not withstand the renewed assault, quickly surrender the captured fort and retreating across the Surma River to new fortifications. After further fierce fighting that strained the imperial forces, news of Khwaja Usman's defeat broke the morale of Bayazid and his men. He left Sylhet to Mubariz Khan and proceeded to Dhaka with Shaikh Kamal and officially submitted to Islam Khan. Thus, Sylhet was annexed to the Bengal Subah, and administrative arrangements were made.

== Aftermath ==
Shuja'at Khan posted troops at Uhar and garrisons in the forts of Taraf and Sarail. Ihtimam Khan commander of Mughal flotilla in Bengal died at Sarail. The kinsmen of Khwaja Usman were taken to Dhaka on 8 April 1612. Islam Khan disbanded the army of the Afghans and his relatives were kept in strict confinement. Shuja'at Khan was bestowed the title Rustam-i-Zaman (transl. Rustam of the Age). Bayazid, his brother and Afghan chiefs also faced similar situation. A Mughal faujdar with many revenue collectors were appointed in Sylhet. The region served as a Mughal military post to carry out further campaigns in north-eastern frontier. Shortly after Islam Khan launched campaign against the Kachari Kingdom.

== See also ==
- Mughal conquest of Jessore
- Mughal conquest of Odisha
- Mughal conquest of Bakla
- Mughal conquest of Bhulua

== Bibliography ==
- Borah, M. I. (1936). "CHAPTER IX.". Baharistan-I-Ghaybi. Vol. 1. Gauhati, Assam: Narayani Handiqui Historical Institute.
- Sarkar, Jadunath, ed. (1943). The History of Bengal. Vol. II: Muslim Period. Delhi: B.R. Publishing Corporation. ISBN 81-7646-239-X.
- Roy, Atul Chandra (1968). History of Bengal: Mughal Period, 1526-1765 A.D. Vol. 3. Calcutta: Nababharat Publishers. Archived from the original on 2017-01-23.
- Gommans, Jos J. L. (2002). Mughal Warfare: Indian Frontiers and Highroads to Empire, 1500-1700. Routledge. ISBN 978-0-415-23989-9.
- Roy, Kaushik (2015-06-03). Warfare in Pre-British India – 1500BCE to 1740CE. Routledge. ISBN 978-1-317-58692-0.
- Bhattasali, Nalini Kanta (1942). "Early days of Mughal rule in Dacca". Islamic Culture. XVI.
