= Mughal conquest of Bengal =

16th–17th-century military campaign

- Part of Mughal conquests and Mughal–Afghan Wars
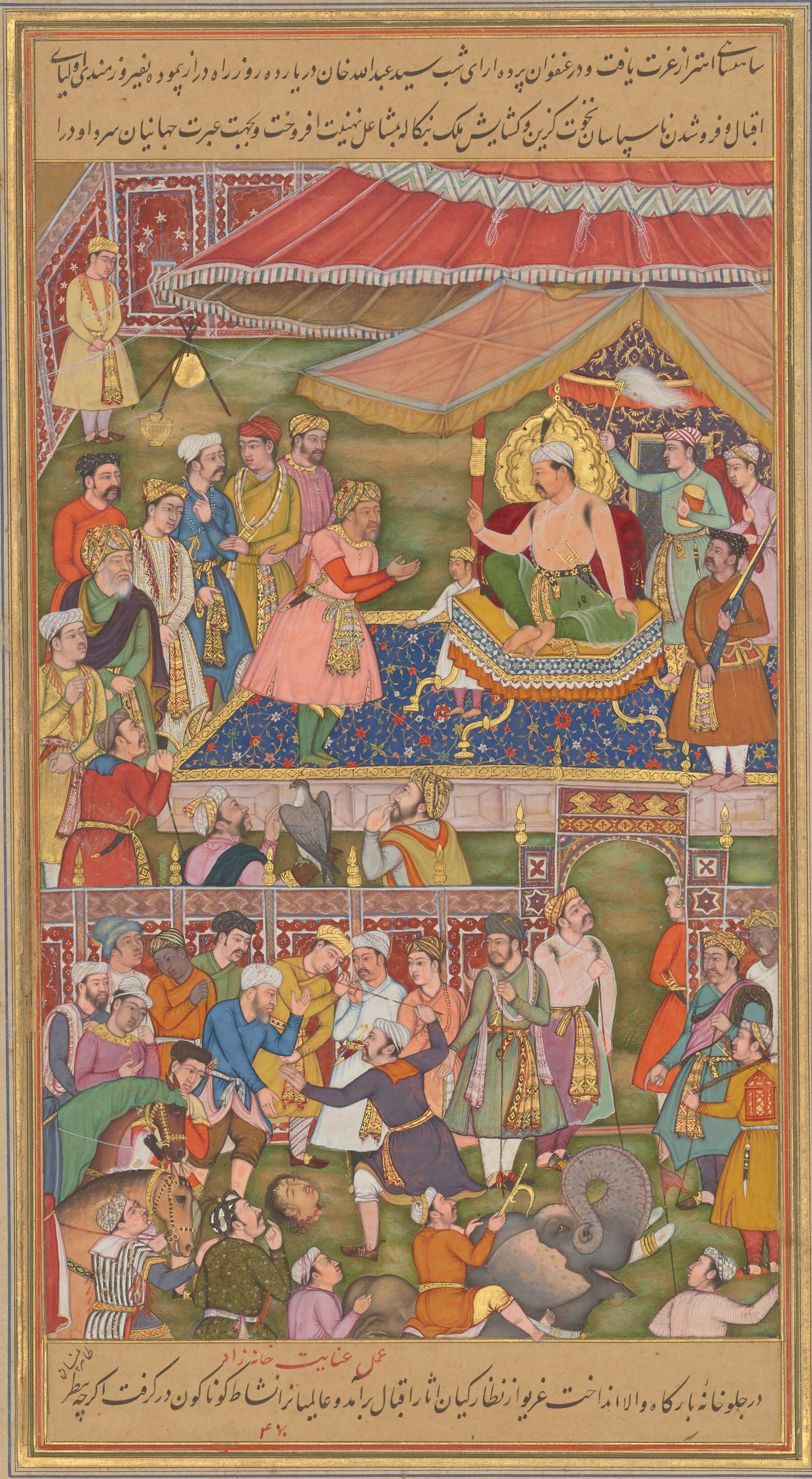
- Akbar's general informs him of the conquest of Bengal in 1576, from the "History of Akbar" (Akbarnama), by Abu’l-Fazl. Inscribed to 'Inayat Khanazad, Agra, India, c. 1603-1605
Date	1574–1666 (92 years)
Location	Bengal, Bihar, Odisha, Assam
Result	Mughal victory: Fall of Bengal Sultanate; Fall of Bhulua Kingdom; Fall of Koch Hajo; Vassalization of Koch Bihar; Decline of Kingdom of Mrauk U
Territorial changes	Full territorial changes: 1574: Patna, Hajipur, Surajgarh, Mungir, Bhagalpur, Kahlgaon, Tanda, Ghoraghat annexed to the Mughal Empire; 1575: de jure annexation of Bengal Sultanate following the Battle of Tukaroi. The territory was divided between the Koch Kingdom and the Bengal Subah; 1580: Rebels seize Bengal and Bihar from the Mughal Empire; 1580–1587: Mughal recapture of Bihar and Bengal and subsequent campaigns; 1590–1593: Mughal conquest of Odisha; 1600: Rebels temporarily seize north Odisha; 1608–1613: Conquest of Bikrampur, Sonargaon, Sripur, Bhulua, Bakla, Jessore, Sylhet in east Bengal, Cooch Behar and Kamrup; 1614–1615: Unsuccessful Mrauk U invasion of Bhulua; 1617: Unsuccessful Mughal siege of Chittagong; 1618: Mughal annexation of Tripura; 1665–1666: Mughal conquest of Chittagong and Sandwip

Belligerents
Bengal Sultanate (1574–1576); Baro-Bhuyan (1576–1612); Mughal rebels Kingdom of Mrauk U (1602–1666); Supported by: Koch Hajo; Dimasa Kingdom	Mughal Empire; Kingdom of Amber; Koch Bihar; Awadh Subah

Commanders and leaders
Daud Khan Karrani (executed) Commanders and others: Junaid Khan Karrani †; Kalapahar †; Isa Khan #; Jahan Khan †; Sulaiman Mankali †; Srihari; Gujar Khan †; Babu Mankali; Gajapati Shah; Qutlu Lohani #; Mahmud Khan Khas-khel (executed); Ibrahim Maral (surrendered); Karim-dad Musazai (surrendered); Majlis Dilawar; Majlis Qutb; Dalpat Shah; Bahadur Kheshgi †; Bahadur Kuruh; Yusuf bin Mati Afghan; Nasir Khan (surrendered); Khwajah Sulaiman Lohani †; Kedar Ray (DOW); Jalal Khan; Qazi Mamin †; Khwaja Usman; Musa Khan; Mirza Mumin; Dariya Khan †; Madhu Ray; Shams Khan; Salim Khan; Raja Satrajit; Pratapaditya (until 1609); Raja Kandarpanarayan Ray; Binod Ray; Abdullah Khan; Mahmud Khan; Fazl Ghazi; Bahadur Ghazni; Sona Ghazi; Anwar Ghazi; Shaikh Pir; Pahlwan; Haji Shams-ud-din Baghdadi (until 1611); Daud Khan †; Alaul Khan; Ananta Manikya; Mirza Yusuf Barlas; Raghu Dev; Mughal rebels: Masum Khan Kabuli #; Baba Qaqshal; Bahadur Badakhshi; Dastam Qaqshal; Tahir Ilanchaq; Jabbari; Khabita †; Tarkhan Diwana; Nur Muhammad †; Khwajah Abdur Ghafur †; Sher Afghan Khan; Lachin Khan Qaqshal #; Ali Akbar †; Kingdom of Mrauk U: Min Razagyi; Min Khamaung; Min Razagyi; Min Khamaung; Thiri Thudhamma; Narapati; Thadao; Sanda Thudhamma	Akbar; Jahangir; Shah Jahan; Aurangzeb Commanders: Man Singh I; Jagat Singh (WIA); Durjan Singh †; Himmat Singh #; Maha Singh; Pratap Singh; Munim Khan #; Muzaffar Khan Turbati †; Khan Jahan I; Raja Todar Mal; Majnun Khan Qaqshal; Muhammad Quli Barlas #; Shah Bardi #; Shahbaz Khan Kamboh; Muhib Ali Khan; Tarsun Khan †; Azam Khan Koka; Sadiq Khan; Muhammad Nijat Khan; Wazir Khan #; Sayyid Husain (POW); Habib Ali †; S'aid Khan #; Bika Bathor †; Mahesh Das †; Nam Charan †; Vir Hambir Singh; Abdur Razzaq Ma'muri (POW); Baz Bahadur Qalmaq; Sher Ghazni; Sultan Quli Qalmaq; Ibrahim Beg Atka; Raghudas; Askarn; Dalpat Rao; Qutubuddin Koka †; Sazawal Khan Niyazi †; Shaikh Kamal; Iftikhar Khan; Pratapaditya (from 1609); Sangramaditya; Tuqmaq Khan; Mirak Bahadur Jalair; Shaikh Habibullah; Shaikh Abdul Wahid; Shaikh Rukn; Jahan Khan Pani; Haji Shams-ud-din Baghdadi (from 1611); Mirza Nur-ud-din; Mirza Isfandiyar Khan; Khwaja 'Asl; Adil Beg; Mirza Beg; Abd-un-Nabi; Nara Narayan; Lakshmi Narayan; Chilarai

Strength
1582: 5,000; 1601: 5,000 infantry 500 cavalry 1609: 200 boats (Note: Under Mirza Mumin); 700 boats (Note: Under Musa Khan) Mrauk U: 1612: 300 boats 1614: 300,000; 1615: Unknown 1617: Kathgar: 100,000 infantry 1,000 war-boats 400 elephants; Chittagong: 300,000 infantry 10,000 cavalry; 1620: 700 batteries 4,000 boats 1621: Unknown; 1624: Unknown; 1638: 200 boats 1664: 60–70 vessels 1666: 10 ghurabs 45 jalias	1574: 20,000 (Note: Under Munim Khan); 1582: 2,000 (Note: Under Sadiq Khan); 1583: 4,000 cavalry; 3,000 artillerymen (Note: Under Shah Bardi); 1608: 295 elephants 2,000 cavalry 4,000 musketeers 1609: 20 boats 2,000 musketeers 50 artillery (Note: Under Shaikh Kamal, Tuqmaq Khan and Mirak Bahadur Jalair against Musa Khan); 1611: 4,000 cavalry 3,000 matchlocks 50 elephants (Note: Under Shaikh Abdul Wahid during the Mughal conquest of Bhulua); 1615: 2,000 cavalry 3,000 musketeers 700 boats 100 elephants (Note: During Mrauk U invasion of Bhulua); 1617: 5,000 cavalry 5,000 musketeers 200 elephants 1,000 boats (Note: During the Siege of Chittagong (1617)); 1618: 5,700 or 6,000 cavalry 9,000 matchlock 70 elephants 300 boats (Note: During the Mughal campaign of Tripura)

Casualties and losses
1574: 265 elephants captured 1580: 300 boats captured 1585: 1300 killed 1593: 300 killed Mrauk U: 1614: 500 killed 1615: 500 killed 1,000 wounded 1666: 135 boats captured	Unknown

The Mughal conquest of Bengal was a series of campaigns against the Sultanate of Bengal, then ruled by the Afghan Karrani dynasty, by the Mughal Empire from 1574 to 1666. The Mughals initially defeated the Sultanate of Bengal in the Battle of Raj Mahal in 1576, but the annexation of the region into their empire as the province of Bengal took in the subsequent periods.

The conquest of Bengal, along with the contemporaneous Roshani movement in the frontier Kabul Subah, are considered the fourth phase of the Mughal–Afghan Wars.

== Background ==
Before the Mughal conquest, Bengal was a flourishing region ruled by the Afghan Karrani dynasty. The dynasty had established its control over Bengal in the mid-16th century, after the decline of the Sur Empire. The Karrani rulers maintained a relatively strong hold over the region, fostering trade and cultural development.

Bengal was known for its fertile land, which supported extensive agriculture, and its strategic location along the Bay of Bengal, which facilitated trade with various parts of Asia, including the Middle East, Southeast Asia, and China. The region's wealth and prosperity made it a coveted prize for the Mughal Empire, which was expanding its territories under the leadership of Emperor Akbar.

However, the Karrani dynasty faced internal strife and political instability, weakening its ability to defend against external threats. This period of vulnerability provided an opportune moment for the Mughal Empire to launch its military campaigns and bring Bengal under its control.

== Under Akbar ==
=== Initial campaigns (1574) ===
The last Karrani ruler Daud Khan Karrani, had hostile policy towards Akbar. He cut off allegiance to Akbar and defied his suzerainty. After Daud crowning himself, Gujar Khan, installed Bayazid Khan Karrani's son in Bihar. Daud dispatched Ludi Khan against Bihar. Munim Khan, ordered by Akbar advanced to Bihar to capture the province. Ludi Khan and Gujar Khan bought presents and promised loyalty. After receiving reinforcements Mumin Khan laid siege on Patna, where Daud had shut himself up. Akbar himself arrived at the siege carrying guns and war elephants on 3 August 1574. On 6 August, Hajipur was captured and set on fire. Daud meantime fled to Bengal while Gujar Khan deserted. The Mughals entered the fort of Patna. 265 elephants and treasure were captured. Munim Khan was left with 20,000 troops to carry deep into Bengal. Surajgarh, Munger, Bhagalpur, Kahlgaon fell to the Mughals without any fight. He entered the capital Tanda on 25 September 1574. It is said Nara Narayan allied with Mughals to invade Bengal. Chilarai invaded from the east. Following the defeat of Daud, Bengal Sultanate was divided between the Mughals and the Koch dynasty.

Daud fled to Orissa by the way of Satgaon. From Tanda, Munim Khan dispatched detachments to capture Satgaon, Ghoraghat, Bakla (Bakarganj), Sonargaon (Dhaka), Mahmudabad (Jessore–Faridpur). In Ghoraghat, the jagirdar Sulaiman Mankali was defeated and slain by Majnun Khan Qaqshal. Srihari, father of Pratapaditya took refuge in jungles of Khulna. However Mughals could not fully establish their authority in Pabna, Rangpur–Dinajpur, Mymensingh, Bhawal (north Dhaka), Jessore-Khulna, Barisal or Bankura-Birbhum. Raja Todar Mal proposed to proceed into Orissa and capture Daud to end the war. He led his army from Burdwan to Garh-Mandaran then to Kolia. There Muhammad Quli Barlas died. Todar Mal receiving reinforcement by Munim Khan himself resumed his offensive. The Mughal army met Daud on the plains of Tukaroi.

=== Battle of Tukaroi (1575) ===
One of the pivotal moments in the conquest was the Battle of Tukaroi, fought in 1575. The Mughal forces, led by Munim Khan and Todar Mal, faced the army of Daud Khan Karrani. Daud's general Gujar Khan was killed in the battle. The battle was fierce, with both sides suffering significant casualties. However, the superior tactics and discipline of the Mughal army ultimately led to their victory, forcing Daud Khan to retreat to Cuttack. On 12 April, he submitted to Munim Khan in the durbar tent at Cuttack. His submission declared the de jure annexation of Bengal to Mughal Empire although de facto control was established only over a few towns in Bihar and Bengal.

Munim Khan proceeded to recover Ghoraghat, where the Mughal outpost had been driven out by Kalapahar, Babu Mankali and others who had returned from Kuch Bihar during Munim Khan's absence. He then captured Gaur and returned to Tanda. Munim Khan died shortly after on 23 October 1575 AD.

Munim Khan was succeeded by Husain Quli Beg entitled Khan-i-Jahan. Daud rising again in Orissa, captured Bhadrak, Jaleswar and reoccupied the whole Bengal. Isa Khan drove out a Mughal flotilla under Shah Bardi from East Bengal while Junaid Karrani was creating havoc in south-east Bihar. At Hajipur Muzaffar Khan Turbati defended the possession with great fight. Gajapati Shah engaged in robbery in the Arrah district. Mughals counterattacked capturing Teliagarhi, forcing Daud to retreat to Rajmahal. Khan-i-Jahan laid siege there for months. To help the expedition, Akbar sent detachments from Bihar under Shahbaz Khan to suppress Gajapati.

=== Battle of Raj Mahal (1576) ===
A decisive battle with Daud took place at Raj Mahal on 10 July 1576. Khan-i-Jahan's forces, having regrouped and reinforced with the Bihar army, engaged in battle with the Karranis. Junaid Khan Karrani was killed in the battle by a cannonball, and Jahan Khan the governor of Orissa was slain. Daud was captured and executed for breaking the treaty.

Kalapahar and Qutlu Lohani fled wounded. Thus Bengal came into the possession of Mughals once again. In south-west Bihar, Shahbaz forced Gajapati Shah to flee leaving his arms behind. Subsequently, Rohtas fort was surrendered to the invading army. Khan-i-Jahan then attacked Satgaon, defeating Mahmud Khan Khas-khel. Daud's family members surrendered. Mahmud Khan Khas-khel surrendered as well but was executed. He then marched to Bhawal (north of Dhaka) against the Afghan chiefs Ibrahim Maral and Karim-dad Musazai who submitted on his arrival. Another contingent defeated Isa Khan at Egarasindur. An attack by Majlis Dilawar and Majlis Qutb routed the Mughal flotilla helping them to flee.

=== Rebellions and recovery of Bengal and Bihar (1580–1586) ===
In April 1579, Muzaffar Khan Turbati was appointed as the viceroy of Bengal. In 1579—January 1580, the Bengal officers backed by Akbar's brother who was Sunni in faith, Mirza Muhammad Hakim, the ruler of Kabul, declared revolt. Muzaffar Khan sent an army to suppress the rebels. His army suffered defeat which prompted him to seek refuge in the fort of Tanda. On the following day, the rebels carried out an assault on the fort. On 19 April 1580, Muzaffar Khan Turbati was killed and khutbah was read in the name of Mirza Muhammad Hakim. Baba Qaqshal was appointed as the viceroy of Bengal and Masum Khan Kabuli as wakil. Thus, Bengal and Bihar became independent from the Mughals. Hindu zamindars in both the southeastern and southwestern delta shook their alliance off. Soon the loyalists recovered Bihar. In Tirhut Bahadur Badakhshi usurped, proclaiming himself independent. Muhib Ali Khan of Rohtas defeated Bahadur and recovered Patna. Tarsun Khan and Todar Mal arrived with forces at Munger to confront the rebels. On 7 June, the rebels carried out an assault but lost 300 boats to the Mughals. Skirmishes continued until desertion by rebels on 25 July. By September, Mughals had captured Gaya and Sherghati. Azam Khan Koka defeated Dalpat Shah of Jagdishpur and joined the main army.

Qutlu Lohani had established himself in Orissa. He defeated Muhammad Nijat Khan, the Mughal faujdar of Hooghly at Salimabad, and also gained success against another Mughal force near Mangalkot. Internal strife and treachery amongst the nobles in the Mughal army and Bengal chiefs weakened the progress of both sides for the following two years. Bengal chief Bahadur Kheshgi was killed by Sadiq Khan, a loyal commandant. Baba Qaqshal died too. In April 1582, Mirza Aziz Koka entitled Khan-i-Azam was appointed in Bengal. Awadh Subah was ordered to co-operate with him. Meanwhile, rebels had captured Hajipur and other parganas from the Mughals. Bahadur Kuruh, general of Qutlu Khan joined the rebels at Tanda. Sadiq Khan defended Patna fort, and even attacked the rebel forces under Jabbari, Khabita and Tarkhan Diwana. Sadiq Khan leading 2,000 men defeated an army of 5,000 rebels killing Khabita, Tarkhan Diwana's son Nur Muhammad and Khwajah Abdur Ghafur in various engagements.

On 20 March 1583, Khan-i-Azam after capturing Teliagarhi, appeared before Masum Khan Kabuli for fight. The two armies exchanged guns and muskets for the next month. In the meantime, Kalapahad was slain in a battle. Many officers of the Qaqshal clan defected to the Mughal side. Masum Khan attacked defectors at the town of Ghoraghat but Mughal cavalry numbering 4,000 repulsed the siege. On 18 May 1583, Khan-i-Azam was replaced by Shabaz Khan Kamboh. Bengal was left in charge of Wazir Khan for five months. Seizing the opportunity, Qutlu Khan carried out offensives. The Mughals marched from Sherpur to Bardhaman and defeated Bahadur Kuruh on 15 July. Mughal detachments were sent to Ghoraghat to protect loyal Qaqshals to block rebels from Kuch Bihar and Mymensingh, and to Burdwan and Satgaon to monitor revived Pathan forces in Orissa under Qutlu Lohani. In October, Masum Khan harassed Tarsun Khan in Tajpur but was repulsed. After two years of fighting against the rebels Akbar's authority was finally re-established with the exception of Masum Khan Kabuli who remained independent for seventeen years. Shah Bardi died and 3,000 of his artillerymen entered Shahbaz Khan's service. Shahbaz led forces against Baba Bhakari who fled upon his approach. Masum Khan fled to Kuch Bihar. Many fugitives were defeated or captured. In the same year, the Mughals shifted their military focus toward suppressing resistance in the eastern Bengal delta, a region they designated as Bhati. Derived from the word for "downstream," Bhati was characterized by Abul-fazl as a low-lying, vast territory distinct from the higher lands of western "Bangala." Geographically, Bhati encompassed the delta east of the Bhagirathi-Hooghly corridor, stretching from Tanda to the Khulna District. In 1584, Shahbaz Khan overran Isa Khan's territory of Bikrampur, capturing Sonargaon, Egarasindur. He established a base at Tok opposite of Egarasindur. Isa Khan returned from Kuch Bihar and faced an army under Tarsun Khan. Surprising the invading army Tarsun was captured and beheaded. Isa Khan captured Sayyid Husain the thanadar of Dhaka and began negotiations through him. As negotiations failed, Shahbaz engaged in a battle with Isa Khan in September which resulted disastrous. He fell back to Tanda after abandoning his conquests. Thus, his first campaign in east Bengal failed miserably. Masum Khan advanced to Sherpur and other Afghans raided up to Malda. In South Wazir Khan continued fighting Qutlu Khan who offered submission.

In January 1585, Masum Khan was driven away and Sherpur was recovered. Dastam Qaqshal, another rebel leader was driven back to Shahzadpur, Pabna. In March 1585, Wazir Khan and Sadiq Khan were sent against Masum Khan Kabuli and Shahbaz Khan proceeded in North Bengal. In late March, Masum Khan Kabuli was defeated in a naval battle. Two of his forts at Trimohani was captured. Tahir Ilanchaq gained success against the Mughals. Yusuf bin Mati Afghan killed Habib Ali, son of Muhib Ali in conflict in Tanda. Bitterness between the commanders prevented them from suppressing the rebels. Akbar at last separated the charges. Sadiq Khan was placed in charge of Bengal and Shahbaz Khan in Bihar. S'aid Khan and other generals in Bihar took charge of Bengal. This gave a chance to the Afghans of Orissa to plunder Burdwan. On 10 June 1585, the Mughal imperial army advanced against the enemies, defeating and killing 1,300 of them. Dastam Qaqshal reappeared and laid siege on Ghoraghat but was defeated. In 1586, Shahbaz Khan was sent back to Bengal again. He won over Afghans through diplomacy. Masum Khan Kabuli sent his son to the Mughal court. Isa Khan sought peace and restored territories which he had captured previously from Sadiq Khan. Qutlu Khan was left undisturbed to rule Orissa. In February, the imperial forces reached Chittagong, its Arakanese ruler sent the Mughals elephants as tribute. The Mughals restored their authority up to Satgaon. Both Wazir Khan and S'aid Khan died in August 1587 AD.

=== Viceroy of Man Singh in Bihar (1587–1594) ===
In late 1587, Man Singh was appointed as the viceroy of Bihar. Man Singh first directed his campaign against Puran Mal of Gidhuar, who declared independence earlier. The fort of Gidhuar was captured and Puran Mal became vassal of the Mughal Empire. Next Sangram Singh, the Raja of Khargpur submitted agreeing to pay tribute. He then raided territories of Anant Chero of Gaya. During his absence, two rebel leaders of Bengal raided Purnia and Darbhanga. Man Singh's son Jagat Singh advanced against the raiders, who fled away abandoning their gains.

==== Conquest of Odisha (1590–1593) ====
In April 1590, Man Singh, reinforced by the Bengal artillery began his journey to conquer Odisha. On 21 May, Jagat Singh faced an surprise attack from the Afghans. The Mughals made a retreat despite officers like Bika Bathor, Mahesh Das, and Nam Charan were killed. Jagat Singh, was wounded and barely managed to escape with the help of Raja Vir Hambir. Qutlu Khan died and his son Nasir Khan became the ruler of Odisha. He made peace with Mughals which included khutbah to be read in the name of Akbar and coins be minted. In 1591 AD, Nasir broke the treaty by laying siege to the Jagannath Temple of Puri which was under Mughal territory as well as attacking Raja Vir Hambir Singh. Man Singh was again called to marched to Odisha. In April 1592 Man Singh alongside Jagat Singh and Durjan Singh fought the Afghans in a battle near Subarnarekha River. The Mughal army emerged victorious killing 300 Afghans including their commander Khwaja Wais as well as capturing Sultan Sur. In the following year, Man Singh successfully conquered Odisha and subjugated many Rajas throughout the region. There Ramchandra Deva of Khurda became a vassal of the Mughals. He returned to Bihar in 1593 AD.

=== Viceroy of Man Singh in Bengal (1595–1606) ===
Man Singh arriving at Tanda dispatched armies in various districts. In April 1595, Himmat Singh conquered the fort of Bhushna in Faridpur District. (Note: Bhusna was located in twenty miles southwest of Faridpur on the border of modern border of Jessore.) In December, he set out to conquer Isa Khan's territory in east Bengal. Soon much of Isa Khan's territory fell to the Mughals. In Orissa Durjan Singh captured the fort of Kakruya, the zamindar of that territory sought alliance with Golconda Sultanate. In June 1596, Durjan Singh captured Bhushna which had been captured by Khwajah Sulaiman Lohani and Kedar Rai. Sulaiman was killed while Kedar Rai wounded, fled to Isa Khan. In July–September Himmat Singh plundered the territory of Mymensingh and Egarasindur. Lakshmi Narayan, the ruler of the Kingdom of Koch Bihar, faced an attack from his cousin Raghu Dev, who had allied with Isa Khan. He sought protection to Akbar who in reply sent Man Singh to help. In December 1596, Lakshmi Narayan personally welcomed Man Singh and cemented the alliance. Upon learning of Man Singh's rapid advance, both Raghu Dev and Isa Khan fled. Through this intervention, Koch Bihar became a vassal state on the north-eastern frontier of Mughal Bengal. Himmat Singh died in March 1597. Raghu Dev gathering an army attacked Koch Bihar, forcing Lakshmi Narayan to flee. Man Singh's forces defeated him on 3 May, but Isa Khan soon intervened. Man Singh countered by sending his son Durjan Singh to attack Isa Khan. On 5 September near Bikrampur, Isa Khan ambushed and routed the Mughals, killing Durjan Singh. However, he then made peace, releasing prisoners, halting attacks on Lakshmi Narayan, and submitting to Akbar. Man Singh returned to Ajmer in 1598.

Despite several Mughal victories, the Baro-Bhuyans, led by Isa Khan, fiercely resisted Mughal control. Using guerrilla tactics and leveraging local knowledge, Isa Khan and his allies maintained significant autonomy, preventing the Mughals from fully consolidating their power over Bengal. Their resistance created a prolonged conflict that thwarted Mughal ambitions during Isa Khan's lifetime. It was not until Isa Khan's death in 1599 that the Mughals began to establish more comprehensive control over Bengal. Even then, the process was gradual, marked by ongoing efforts to integrate the region into the Mughal administrative framework. Isa Khan's legacy of defiance remains a significant chapter in Bengal's history, symbolizing the region's resilience and resistance to external domination. Masum Khan Kabuli also died in May of the same year.

=== Rebellion and further campaigns (1600–1605) ===
Man Singh's absence allowed the Afghans to begin rebellion. In April 1600 AD, the rebels defeated a force under Maha Singh the son of Jagat Singh and Pratap Singh and successfully recovered north Odisha. They further capture Mughal officer Abdur Razzaq Ma'muri. Man Singh hastened back to Bengal. First, he defeated the rebels near Sherpur. Then marched to Dhaka and persuaded Kedar Rai (Note: Zamindar of Sripur in South Dhaka) to became loyal to Akbar. Meantime Maha Singh attacked Jalal Khan who was plundering in Malda. He defeated the enemy army of 500 cavalry and 5,000 infantry. He proceeded to Purnia against the rebel Qazi Mamin and killed him. Khwaja Usman the nephew and successor of Qutlu Khan, drove back Baz Bahadur Qalmaq, thanadar of Mymensingh to Bhawal. Man Singh led an counterattack and inflicted heavy losses on the rebels. In February 1602, contingents of the imperial army were sent against Musa Khan son of Isa Khan and Kedar Rai. Sher Ghazi, a local zamindar proceeded against Musa Khan and Kedar Rai but the Afghans retreated to Sonargaon. In August 1603, Arakanese pirates attacked and captured the fort at Tri-mohani after Sultan Quli Qalmaq fled. They advanced inland, plundering Mughal posts. A force sent by Man Singh, led by Ibrahim Beg Atka, Raghudas, Askarn, Dalpat Rao and other captains, defeated the invaders in battle. The pirates retreated to their boats and fired on the Mughals, but the Mughals sank several gunboats. Kedar Rai joined with the Arakanese with his own fleet and attacked Mughal outpost at Srinagar. In the encounter he was wounded and captured. He was brought in front of Man Singh where he died. Man Singh then proceeded against the Arakanese Raja Min Razagyi and Usman both of whom fled away. He returned to Dhaka in middle of 1604 AD. Akbar died in 1605 and on 29 October 1605 Jahangir succeeded him. Man Singh established a Mughal coastal navy with the aid of Portuguese pirates to counter the Arakanese invasion.

== Under Jahangir ==
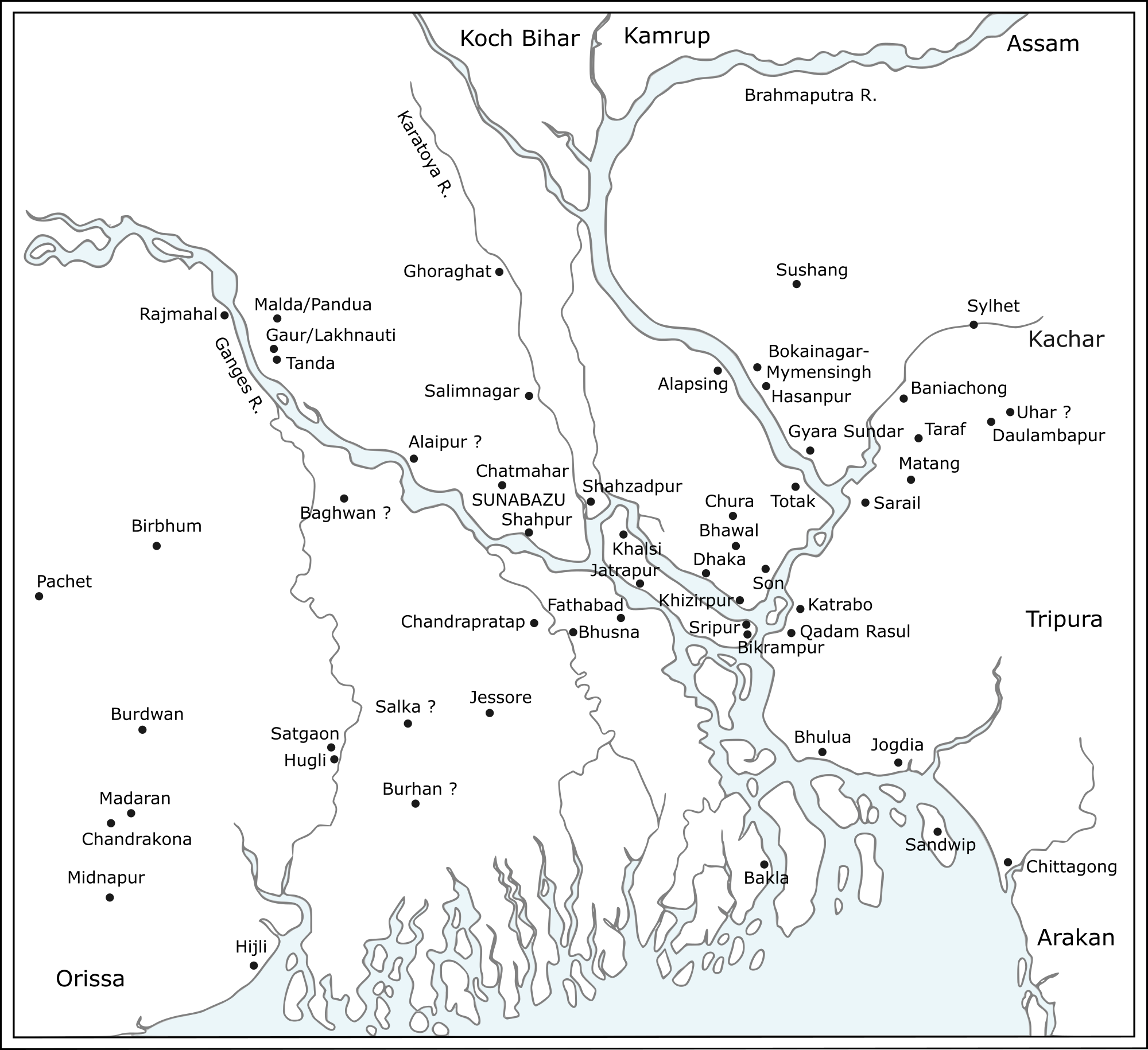
Bengal in the Mughal age c. 1608–1612

Jahangir appointed Qutubuddin Koka replacing Man Singh in September 1606. He was killed by rebellious faujdar of Bardhaman Sher Afghan Khan on 30 May 1607. Following Qutubuddin's death Jahangir Quli Khan, governor of Bihar was transferred to Bengal. He soon died in May 1608 AD.

=== Viceroy of Islam Khan (1608–1613) ===
In early June 1608, Islam Khan assumed the responsibility of Bengal. He dismissed all the Afghan generals including sons of Masum Khan Kabuli and Lachin Khan Qaqshal. Khwaja Usman of Bokainagar, captured Alapsingh pargana, near Brahmaputra River in Mymensingh, killing its thanadar Sazawal Khan Niyazi and occupied the entire region. Islam Khan dispatched Shaikh Ghiyasuddin and recovered the thana. Raja Pratapaditya of Jessore, sent envoy and submitted to the Mughals during his governorship.

==== Campaign in east Bengal (1608–1611) ====
Islam Khan then started campaign against the Bhati region. From Rajmahal he composed an army of 295 elephants and numerous war boats and artillery under Ihtimam Khan. Meanwhile, Mirza Mumin, Dariya Khan, and Madhu Ray captured Sonabazu and Chatmahar pargana in Pabna and Rajshahi Districts. Ihtimam Khan’s small force failed to suppress them. Islam Khan sent a force of 2,000 cavalry and 4,000 musketeers under the command of Shaikh Kamal who subdued Bir Hamir of Birbhum, Shams Khan of Pachet in Ranijganj and Salim Khan of Hijli. In 1609, Iftikhar Khan subdued Raja Satrajit zamindar of Bhushna. Following that, Islam Khan made preparations to recover the Sonabazu pargana. Mirza Nathan recovered Chatmahar without any fighting. Iftikhar Khan and Raja Satrajit jointly attacked Ekdanta in Pabna, but the place was abandoned. At Shahpur (in Pabna), Pratapaditya personally came to submit to Islam Khan. He aided the governor of Bengal with 400 boats with his son Sangramaditya while promising to join the Mughals in a joint expedition against Musa Khan. Mughal outposts suffered heavy assaults throughout the year. Raja Ray local zamindar led an unsuccessful siege on the fort of Shahzadpur in Pabna held under Tuqmaq Khan. Another ally of Musa Khan zamindar Binod Ray alongside Mirza Munim, Dariya Khan and Madhu Ray attacked Mirak Bahadur Jalair's Chandpratap situated in Manikganj but in vain. Islam Khan dispatched Shaikh Habibullah against Majlis Qutb, zamindar of Fathabad. The Mughals laid siege on Fathabad. Majlis Qutb asked help to Musa Khan who responded by sending Mirza Mumin with a large force and 200 war boats. Miza Mumin made several attempts but repulsed.

==== War with Musa Khan ====
In October 1609, Islam Khan led army and fleet against Musa Khan. Shaikh Kamal, Tuqmaq Khan and Mirak Bahadur Jalair were sent to Dhaka with 20 war-boats, 2000 musketeers, 50 pieces of artillery. The Mughal army attacked the fort of Jatrapur lying in the west of Dhaka. Musa Khan dispatched Mirza Mumin, Dariya Khan and Madhu Ray to defend the fort. Dariya Khan was murdered by Mumin. Musa Khan, taking 700 war-boats marched with Abdullah Khan, Mahmud Khan, Bahadur Ghazni of Chaura, Sona Ghazi of Sarail, Anwar Ghazi of Banichang, Shaikh Pir, Mirza Mumin, Madhu Ray, Binod Ray, Pahlwan of Matang, and Haji Shams-ud-din Baghdadi. The imperial army engaged in a battle with Musa Khan, forcing him to retreat to Dakchara. Islam Khan tried to capture Dakchara but failed. He shifted strategy with a surprise night attack on Jatrapur, while keeping Musa Khan distracted at Dakchara. The Mughal army crossed the Ichhamati at night, caught Musa Khan off guard, and after brief fighting, captured Jatrapur in June 1610. On 15 July 1610, Mirza Nathan captured the fort of Dakchara. Next Islam Khan reached Dhaka. There he dispatched Mirak Bahadur Jalair to Sripur and Bayazid Khan to Bikrampur. Musa Khan heavily fortified the posts near Narayanganj, Sonargaon, Sripur and Bikrampur. Khatrabahu and Qadam Rasul were entrusted to Ihtimam Khan, other Mughal officers like Shaikh Abdul Wahid, Shaikh Rukn and Jahan Khan Pani were also posted. In March 1611, Mirza Nathan attacked Daud Khan and captured the fort of Katrabhu followed by Ihtimam Khan who captured Qadam Rasul from Abdullah Khan. Next Mirza Nathan captured two fortifications near Bandar Canal and Alaul Khan's fort. In April 1611, Musa Khan submitted to Islam Khan. His brother Daud continued fighting and killed. This enraged Musa Khan who renewed his struggle against the Mughals. Bahadur Ghazi and Majlis Qutb waited on Islam Khan. During this time Ali Akbar mansabdar rose in revolt in Malda. Ifthikhar Khan killed the rebel in a fight. Musa Khan with remaining confederates finally decided to surrender to Islam Khan at Jahangirnagar in July 1611. This time he was placed under detention until Qasim Khan granted his freedom and allowed to participate with the Mughals in military expeditions.

==== Conquest of Bhulua (1611) ====
Shortly after Musa Khan's submission, Islam Khan sent a large army of 4,000 cavalry, 3,000 matchlock-men and 50 elephants under Shaikh Abdul Wahid, Haji Shams-ud-din Baghdadi and others (Note: According to Baharistan-i-Ghaibi Mirza Nuru’d-Din, Mirza Isfandaryar, Khwaja 'Asl, Adil Beg, Mirza Beg participated in the Mughal conquest of Bhulua.) to conquer the Kingdom of Bhulua. The Raja, Ananta Manikya received assistance from Mrauk-U king Min Razagyi (r. 1593–1612). Ananta Manikya strengthened the fortifications of his capital and raised a fort on the bank of the Dakatia River to halt the Mughal expansion. Abdul Wahid after failing to gain any success, induced Mirza Yusuf Barlas, the chief officer of the Raja to defect to the Mughals. Aanata Manikya fell back to his capital and tried to recover his kingdom. Being defeated he fled to Arakan. Bhulua was annexed to the Mughal Empire.

==== Conquest of Koch Kingdom (1609–1613) ====
In 1609 and 1612, Kuch Bihar and Kamrup were annexed, pushing the boundary of Bengal Subah as far as Bornadi River. The corporation between the Koch dynasty and the Mughals in 1576 was based on mutual terms, even dividing Bengal Sultanate's regions between two. By 1613, both Koch Bihar was subjugated while the territory of Koch Hajo was annexed to the Empire. The southeastern frontier of Bengal Subah being fixed at the Feni River, beyond which lay the Kingdom of Mrauk U. By 1612, the Mughals had successfully quelled most of the resistance in Bengal, bringing the region under their full control.

=== Viceroy of Qasim Khan (1613–1617) ===
==== Siege of Chittagong (1617) ====
In early 1617, Subahdar Qasim Khan launched an ambitious invasion of Arakan, targeting the strategic port of Chittagong. The Mughal vanguard, led by the inexperienced Abd-un-Nabi, consisted of 5,000 cavalry, 5,000 matchlockmen, 200 elephants, and 1,000 boats. In response, the Arakanese King Min Khamaung mobilized a colossal defense, dispatching a commandant with 100,000 infantry and 400 elephants to a new fort at Kathgar, while the King himself followed with a main force of 300,000 infantry and 10,000 cavalry to defend Chittagong. The conflict centered on the unfinished fort at Kathgar, where Mughal officers Sarhad Khan and Shaikh Kamal launched a swift assault that nearly secured victory. However, internal Mughal hesitation allowed the Arakanese to reinforce their defenses, turning the assault into a gruelling siege. Exploiting the terrain, 10,000 Arakanese soldiers constructed a strategic stockade that severed the Mughal supply lines from the Feni River, leaving the besiegers starving. Faced with total isolation and the impending monsoon, the Mughal forces were forced into a disastrous retreat to Bhulua, abandoning their heavy artillery and destroying maunds of gunpowder on the way.

== Under Shah Jahan ==
=== Siege of Hooghly (1632) ===
In 1655, Bengal's Subahdar Shah Shuja wrote to Shah Jahan boasting his success in subduing the zamindars of Morang, Kachar and other places to pay tribute.

== Under Aurangzeb ==
=== Conquest of Chittagong (1665–1666) ===
In 1665, the Mughal court directed Bengal's governor, Shaista Khan, to launch an expedition to capture Chittagong and end the persistent raids by Arakanese and Portuguese pirates on lower Bengal's waterways. Buzurg Umed Khan led a force of 6,500 soldiers which departed Dhaka in December 1665, advancing through dense coastal jungles in coordination with a fleet of 288 warships. By January 1666, the Mughal forces reached Chittagong. On 26 January the citadel was captured following a three-day siege. The city was promptly reorganized as a Mughal sarkar, governed by a military faujdar and a chief revenue officer.

== Border campaigns ==
=== Campaign in Tripura (1618) ===
In 1618, Subahdar Ibrahim Khan Fath-i-Jang, launched a decisive invasion against the Kingdom of Tripura ruled by Raja Yashodhar Manikya. The Mughal land forces were split into two formidable divisions: the first, commanded by Mirza Isfandiyar Khan, consisted of over 2,700 cavalry, 4,000 matchlock men, and 20 elephants; the second, led by Mirza Nur-ud-din and Musa Khan, comprised more than 3,000 cavalry, 5,000 matchlock men, and 50 elephants. Supporting these land units was a naval fleet of 300 war boats under Admiral Bahadur Khan. In defense, Yashodhar Manikya mobilized a massive force of 1,000 cavalry, 60,000 infantry, and 200 elephants, alongside a local river fleet. The conflict saw intense fighting and significant casualties on both sides. Yashodhar Manikya first attempted a surprise night attack on Isfandiyar Khan’s division near Kailagad, but despite fierce resistance, the Mughals emerged victorious and captured 70 elephants. During his retreat to the capital, the King launched a second desperate ambush against the sleeping division of Nur-ud-din and Musa Khan near Meherkul, but he was defeated once again with heavy losses. Ultimately, the Mughal navy bypassed Tripura's river defenses to seize the capital, Udaipur. The conquest concluded with the capture of Yashodhar Manikya, his family, and his royal treasures in the forest, marking a total Mughal victory.

== See also ==
- Ekdala Wars
- Tughlaq conquest of Bengal
- Balban's conquest of Bengal
- Mughal conquest of Jessore
- Mughal conquest of Odisha
- Mughal conquest of Bakla
- Mughal conquest of Bhulua
- Mughal conquest of Kamrup

== Bibliography ==
- Sarma, Ramani Mohan (1986). A political History of Tripura. Calcutta: Puthipatra.
- Sarkar, Jadunath, ed. (1943). The History of Bengal. Vol. II: Muslim Period. Delhi: B.R. Publishing Corporation. ISBN 81-7646-239-X.
- Acharyya, N. N. (1966). The History of Medieval Assam, from the Thirteenth to the Seventeenth Century. New Delhi: Omsons Publ.
- Bhattacharya, Sabyasachi (2020). A Comprehensive History of Modern Bengal, 1700-1950. Asiatic Society. ISBN 978-93-89901-95-5.
- Galen, S.E.A. van (2008). Arakan and Bengal : the rise and decline of the Mrauk U kingdom (Burma) from the fifteenth to the seventeeth century AD. Archived from the original on 2019-11-25.
- Roy, Atul Chandra (1968). History of Bengal: Mughal Period, 1526-1765 A.D. Vol. 3. Calcutta: Nababharat Publishers. Archived from the original on 2017-01-23.
- Gommans, Jos J. L. (2002). Mughal Warfare: Indian Frontiers and Highroads to Empire, 1500-1700. Routledge. ISBN 978-0-415-23989-9.
- Eaton, Richard M. (1996-07-31). The Rise of Islam and the Bengal Frontier, 1204-1760. University of California Press. ISBN 978-0-520-20507-9.
- Borah, M. I. (1936). Baharistan-I-Ghaybi. Vol. 1. Gauhati, Assam: Narayani Handiqui Historical Institute.
- Choudhury, Subhrajit (21 February 2024). The Koch Dynasty and Charismatic Bir Chilarai. Shashwat Publications. ISBN 9789360877538.
- Nath, D. (1989), History of the Koch Kingdom, C. 1515-1615, Mittal Publications, ISBN 9788170991090
