= Mughal campaign of Kachar =

Mughal campaign in eastern India (1612–1616)

Date	April–May 1612, 1614
Location	Barak Valley, Assam
Result	See § Aftermath
Territorial changes	Status quo ante bellum

Belligerents
Mughal Empire; Bengal Subah; Bihar Subah	Dimasa Kingdom

Commanders and leaders
Shaikh Kamal; Mubariz Khan # Mirak Bahadur Jalair	Satrudaman (surrendered)

Strength
Unknown	Unknown

Casualties and losses
Heavy	Heavy

The Mughal campaign of Kachar (1612–1614) were two Mughal attempts to subdue the Kachari kingdom known as Dimasa Kingdom in southern Assam. In 1612, under Bengal Subahdar Islam Khan, forces led by Shaikh Kamal and Mubariz Khan invaded Kachar. Raja Satrudaman fortified his borders with forts at Pratapgarh and Asuratekar, defending his hill capital Maibang with guerrilla tactics. Mughals captured both forts after sieges and raids, prompting Satrudaman to sue for peace and agree to tribute. A thana was set up at Asuratekar. In 1613, amid Bengal instability, Satrudaman rebelled. Mubariz Khan and Mirak Bahadur re-invaded from Sylhet, recapturing Pratapgarh and besieging Asuratekar. Facing losses, the raja negotiated peace. But Mubariz Khan's sudden death led to Mughal withdrawal from Asuratekar; the Kacharis regained independence, marking a failed Mughal frontier expansion due to internal issues.

== Background ==
In 1612, during Mughal conquest of Sylhet the Raja of Kachar Satrudaman alias Pratap Narayan (r. 1605–1628) sent a large reinforcement helping Khwaja Usman and Bayazid of Sylhet against the Mughals. Following the annexation of Sylhet, Islam khan launched campaign against the kingdom of Kachar. He sent Shaikh Kamal with Mubariz Khan and 22 amirs from Bihar to conquer the region.

== Campaigns ==
=== Campaign under Islam Khan (1612) ===
The Kachar king Satrudaman resolved to offer strong resistance to the Mughals. His capital Maibang was inaccessible to attackers. To strengthen his defences, he built two forts at strategic points on his western frontier: one on the north-western border at Asuratekar, (Note: Also called Asurainagar. Probably modern Haritikar village, 24°53′0″N 92°30′51″E in Cachar district) and the other on the south-western border at Pratapgarh, south-west of Asuratekar, situated amid dense forest. The imperial forces under Shaikh Kamal advanced to the vicinity of Pratapgarh fort. An assault was attempted, but the Kacharis renowned for their expertise in guerrilla tactics and night raids harassed the Mughals persistently. After a month of siege, the fort of Pratapgarh was captured. The Kachari defenders were forced to withdraw to the hillfort of Asuratekar. The Mughals then proceeded north-eastward, encamping likely on the left bank of the Barak River opposite Asuratekar. Following intense fighting, this second frontier fort was also captured. The fall of both strategic outposts diminished the Kachar king's military resolve, leading him to sue for peace. Shaikh Kamal accepted the proposal and informed Islam Khan, who approved the decision. However, Emperor Jahangir, displeased by Islam Khan's governance, intervened directly. He issued a farman disapproving of the hasty truce and directing the renewal of hostilities under the command of imperial officer Mubariz Khan in place of Shaikh Kamal. Mubariz khan directed his army to Maibang. The Kachar king was left in a critical position. He submitted to the Mughals promising to pay tribute. A Mughal thanah was established at Asuratekar.

Pratapgarh, Asuratekar, and Maibang in Assam

=== Campaign under Qasim Khan (1613) ===
Taking advantage of the interregnum in Bengal, Raja Satrudaman shook off his allegiance to the Mughals. Mubariz Khan subsequently returned to Sylhet, from where he advanced to invade Kachar, accompanied by Mirak Bahadur Jalair. He first attacked the frontier fort of Pratapgarh, and then advanced against the fort of Asuratekar. Satrudaman offered strong resistance, inflicting heavy losses on the Mughals through repeated night attacks. Despite this, Mubariz Khan's persistence resulted in the capture of Pratapgarh. The Mughals then besieged Asuratekar, which could not be taken by direct assault. Unable to withstand the privations of the siege, the Satrudaman sued for peace.

The Satrudaman initiated negotiations, offering terms contingent on exemption from personally attending upon the Mughal Subahdar. He proposed 2 elephants and 20,000 rupees to Mubariz Khan and his colleague Mirak Bahadur Jalair; 5 elephants and 20,000 rupees to the Subahdar Qasim Khan; 40 elephants, 100,000 rupees, and other precious items to Emperor Jahangir. Mubariz Khan accepted these terms, re-established a thana at Asurainagar with a small garrison, and withdrew to Sylhet. He then reported the agreement to Qasim Khan, who ratified it and finalized the settlement.

== Aftermath ==
Mubariz Khan died suddenly soon after. In the resulting confusion, Mirak Bahadur lost courage, evacuated the thanah of Asuratekar, and withdrew to Sylhet. The campaign ultimately failed as the Mughal officer retreated leaving the conquests behind, and Satrudaman regained his independence.

== See also ==
- Mughal conquest of Bengal
- Mrauk invasion of Bhulua
- Ahom–Mughal conflicts

== Bibliography ==
- Borah, M. I. (1936). Baharistan-I-Ghaybi. Vol. 1. Gauhati, Assam: Narayani Handiqui Historical Institute.
- Sarkar, Jadunath, ed. (1943). The History of Bengal. Vol. II: Muslim Period. Delhi: B.R. Publishing Corporation. ISBN 81-7646-239-X.
- Roy, Atul Chandra (1968). History of Bengal: Mughal Period, 1526-1765 A.D. Vol. 3. Calcutta: Nababharat Publishers. Archived from the original on 2017-01-23.
- Nath, Pratyay (2019). Climate of Conquest: War, Environment, and Empire in Mughal North India. Oxford University Press. ISBN 978-0-19-949555-9.
