= Siege of Chittagong (1617) =

Mughal invasion of Chittagong (1617)

- Part of Mughal–Mrauk U Wars
Date	1617
Location	Kathgar, near Sitakunda, Kingdom of Mrauk U
Action	Siege
Result	Mrauk U victory
Territorial changes	Status quo ante bellum

Belligerents
Mughal Empire	Kingdom of Mrauk U

Commanders and leaders
Abd-un-Nabi Commanders: Sarhad Khan; Shaikh Kamal; Mirza Nur-ud-Din; Mirza Isfandiyar; Tatar Khan Miwati; Shaikh Qutb; Shaikh Qasim; Shaikh Afzal; Mirza Saqi; Mirza Baqi; Jamal Khan; Dawran Khan; Mirza Beg; Ima Qa’an; Tufan Bahadur	Min Khamaung

Strength
5,000 cavalry 5,000 musketeers 200 elephants 1,000 boats	Kathgar: 100,000 infantry 1,000 war-boats 400 elephants Chittagong: 300,000 infantry 10,000 cavalry

Casualties and losses
Heavy	Unknown

The Siege of Chittagong (1617) was a Mughal military campaign launched by Qasim Khan, Subahdar of Bengal, to capture the strategically important port city of Chittagong from the Kingdom of Mrauk U. The expedition followed the failure of an earlier Arakanese invasion of Bhulua and a disastrous Mughal campaign in Assam. Advancing from Dhaka, the Mughal army under 'Abd-un-Nabi attempted a surprise attack on an unfinished Arakanese fort at Kathgar, near Sitakunda. Although initial success seemed near, the Mughals suspended hostilities overnight, allowing the Arakanese to recover and mount a strong defence. The Arakanese then constructed a stockade that cut off Mughal supply lines, leaving the besiegers short of food and facing the approaching monsoon. The Mughals were forced to raise the siege, abandon their heavy artillery, destroy their gunpowder, and retreat in disarray towards Bhulua. The campaign ended in failure for the Mughals.

== Background ==
After the disastrous the Mughal invasion of Assam and the failure of the Arakanese invasion of Bhulua in January 1616, the Mughal viceroy Qasim Khan launched an aggressive expedition against Mrauk-U with the aim of wresting Chittagong from the Arakanese hands. The campaign was undertaken on the repeated instructions of Emperor Jahangir.

== Siege ==
Early in 1617 AD, (Note: Jadunath Sarkar dated the invasion to 1616, but this is considered improbable. The Baharistan-i-Ghaibi places the Arakan campaign immediately after the Assam expedition (1615–1616) and before Qasim Khan's removal as governor in 1617. This chronology also rules out 1619, the date given by Sebastien Manrique. The Arakan invasion most likely occurred in 1617.) Qasim Khan decided to attack Arakan. From Dhaka, Qasim Khan marched to Khizrpur, where he was joined by several of his officers. The army took several days to reach Bhulua. From Bhulua, Abd-un-Nabi was sent ahead as commander (Note: According to Baharistan-i-Ghaibi the great nobles who were despatched with 'Abdu'n-Nabi are as follows :— Sarhad Khan, Shaikh Kamal, Mirza Nur-ud-Din; Mirza Isfandiyar, Tatar Khan Miwati, Shaikh Qutb, Shaikh Qasim, Shaikh Afzal, Mirza Saqi, Mirza Baqi, Jamal Khan, Dawran Khan, Mirza Beg, Ima Qa’an, Tufan Bahadur.) of the vanguard with 5,000 cavalry, 5,000 matchlockmen, 200 elephants, and 1,000 boats. Qasim Khan, with the rest of the army, followed in the rear and encamped at the Feni River. This was the route chosen by the Mughals for their attack on Chittagong. The Arakanese did not wait for the Mughal army to reach the heavily fortified city of Chittagong. Min Khamaung sent his commandant with 100,000 infantry, 1,000 war-boats, and 400 elephants, to Kathgar, a village 20 miles north-west of Chittagong near Sitakunda. At Kathgar the Arakanese constructed a new fort to intercept the Mughals on their way to Chittagong. The king himself marched from his capital Mrauk-U for the defence of the fort of Chittagong with an army of 300,000 infantry and 10,000 cavalries, besides a large number of war-boats.

Spies informed that the fortifications at Kathgar were still incomplete and that Min Khamaung had not yet arrived with his main force. Abd-un-Nabi learning the developments advanced rapidly with the aim of capturing the unfinished fort and launching a surprise attack on Chittagong. He left Sarhad Khan and Shaikh Kamal behind to construct a fort and secure the lines of communication and supply for the imperial army. Sarhad Khan and Shaikh Kamal, who possessed better knowledge of the local routes, took a shortcut and reached Kathgar ahead of the main vanguard. They immediately launched an assault on the Arakanese fort, which was still under construction. The Arakanese offered stiff resistance. Although the Mughals pressed the garrison hard and victory appeared imminent by the end of the day, some mansabdars, allegedly in collusion with Sarhad Khan, persuaded the inexperienced 'Abd-un-Nabi to suspend hostilities until the next morning on the pretext of approaching night. When the assault resumed the following morning, the situation had completely changed. The Arakanese garrison had recovered from the initial surprise and mounted a determined defence. Unable to storm the fort, the Mughals abandoned the idea of an immediate assault and began siege operations, dividing their forces into trenches. However, the presence of a high hill on one side made it impossible to fully surround the fort and prolonger the siege. Meanwhile, the Arakanese commander ordered 10,000 men to construct a strong stockade between the Mughal positions at Kathgar and the main imperial camp near the Feni River. This stockade effectively cut off communication and supply lines, affecting Sarhad Khan and Shaikh Kamal, who were responsible for bringing rations. As a result, the besiegers at Kathgar soon found themselves besieged by their enemies. They faced severe shortages of food and supplies. With the approach of the monsoon and the threat of being trapped in hostile territory without provisions, the Mughal officers decided to raise the siege. They retreated towards Bhulua, abandoning their heavy artillery and destroying approximately 500 maunds of gunpowder to prevent it from falling into enemy hands.

== Aftermath ==
The Arakan invasion of 1617 ended in vain. The series of reverses led Jahangir to recall Qasim Khan from Bengal. Most of the achievements of Islam Khan had been undone. Qasim Khan failed even to maintain internal order, rebellion persisted in Kamrup, and most punitive expeditions against rebellious zamindars ended in failure too. In November 1617 Ibrahim Khan Fath-i-Jang was appointed the new Subahdar of Bengal. In 1621, he made another attempt to capture Chittagong which experienced similar outcome.

== See also ==
- Siege of Chittagong (1621)
- Mughal conquest of Bhulua
- Mrauk U invasion of Chittagong
- Mrauk U invasion of Pegu

== Bibliography ==
- Borah, M. I. (1936). "Book II". Baharistan-I-Ghaybi. Vol. 1. Gauhati, Assam: Narayani Handiqui Historical Institute.
- Sarkar, Jadunath, ed. (1943). The History of Bengal. Vol. II: Muslim Period. Delhi: B.R. Publishing Corporation. ISBN 81-7646-239-X.
- Roy, Atul Chandra (1968). History of Bengal: Mughal Period, 1526-1765 A.D. Vol. 3. Calcutta: Nababharat Publishers. Archived from the original on 2017-01-23.
- Galen, S.E.A. van (2008). Arakan and Bengal : the rise and decline of the Mrauk U kingdom (Burma) from the fifteenth to the seventeeth century AD. Archived from the original on 2019-11-25.
