= Mughal conquest of Kamrup =

Part of the Mughal conquest of Bengal in 1613

- Part of Mughal conquest of Bengal
Date	November 1612 — July 1613
Location	Kamrup, Koch Hajo
Result	Mughal victory
Territorial changes	Kamrup as far as Barnadi annexed to the Mughal Empire: Fall of Koch Hajo

Belligerents
Mughal Empire; Bengal Subah; Bihar Subah; Koch Bihar	Koch Hajo

Commanders and leaders
Shaikh Kamal; Mukarram Khan; Raja Raghunath; Shaikh Muhi-ud-din; Mirza Iman Quli Beg Shamlu; Khawaja Tahir Muhammad Bakshi; Adil Khan; Abdus Salam; Mirza Nathan; Raja Satrajit; Bahadur Ghazi; Sona Ghazi; Majlis Bayazid; Jamal Khan Mangli (WIA); Lachmi Rajput (WIA); Mirza Qasim Khazanchi; Sulaiman Sardiwal; Shaikh Abdul Wahid; Lakshmi Narayan	Parikshit Narayan (surrendered); Phulguria Fath Khan Salka (POW); Dimarua Raja †; Nitai Chandra Nazir

Strength
1000 or 6,000 cavalry 10,000—12,000 infantry 5000 musketeers 300 elephants 500 boats	Salkuna: 300 boats Dhubri: 500 cavalry; 100 or 10,000 infantry Gadadhar: 700 boats; 50 elephants Gilah: 156,000 paiks 5,000 cavalry 5,000 musketeers 300 elephants.

Casualties and losses
Gadadhar: 207 boats destroyed; many killed	Salkuna: All or most of 300 boats captured Dhubri: Heavy

The Mughal conquest of Kamrup or Mughal conquest of Koch Hajo was a 1612–1613 military campaign led by Mughal commanders Shaikh Kamal and Mukarram Khan against the eastern Koch Dynasty. Launched by Islam Khan Chishti, the Mughal Subahdar of Bengal, the expedition ended the independence of the Koch Hajo state under Raja Parikshit Narayan and annexed its territory to the Mughal Empire, establishing the first Mughal frontier province on the borders of the Ahom kingdom.

Kamrup, the eastern division of the former Koch kingdom, had emerged after Raghu Dev broke away from his uncle Nara Narayan in 1581. The Sankosh River marked the boundary with the western Koch Bihar kingdom. Rivalry between the two Koch states, combined with alliances involving Baro-Bhuyan such as Isa Khan, drew Mughal intervention. After Lakshmi Narayan of Koch Bihar submitted as a Mughal vassal in 1609, Parikshit Narayan refused to acknowledge Mughal suzerainty. Following the consolidation of Mughal control over parts of Bengal, Islam Khan dispatched a large expeditionary force under Mukarram Khan and Shaikh Kamal in December 1612. The campaign involved major engagements, including the naval clash near Salkuna, the prolonged siege of Dhubri (January–April 1613), and lastly fighting along the Gadadhar River. Parikshit Narayan ultimately surrendered unconditionally in July 1613, surrendering his kingdom and treasures in exchange for his life and personal freedom. The territories were annexed into the Mughal Empire, creating a new imperial frontier with the Ahom kingdom.

== Background ==
In 1581, Rahu Dev revolted against his uncle Nara Narayan (r. 1554–1587) of Koch Kingdom and established his authority over the eastern part of the kingdom. The Sankosh River was decided as the border of the two kingdoms. He established his capital in Barnagar. The eastern division was known as "Kamrup" in local sources and "Koch Hajo" in Persian sources. While the western division was known as "Koch Behar" or simply "Koch". The local sources named it Kamrup due to historical kingdom Kamrupa. Koch Hajo, stretched from the Sonkosh River on west, to the Barnadi River north of the Brahmaputra. To the south, it extended from the Brahmaputra and the Garo Hills which now forms eastern part of Mymensingh and on the eastward the kingdom stretched to the Kalang River in modern-day Nagaon, Assam. It covered the Kamrup district and Goalpara district, along with the administrative pargana of Bhitarband on the fight side of Brahmaputra, including Khontaghat reaching Barnadi River. Key urban centers and frontier points include Pandu, which served as the south-eastern frontier town, and Kohhata, which acted as the frontier town on the eastern border. The rivalry and hostilities between the two divisions allowed foreign powers like the Mughals on west and Ahoms on east to take aggressive policy in the region. In 1584, Nara Narayan died. His son Lakshmi Narayan became the ruler of Koch Bihar. Raghu Dev formed an alliance with the Afghan chief Isa Khan who was fighting against the Mughals. Isa Khan also had hostile attitude towards Koch Bihar as it had been an ally of the Mughals for a long time. Being strengthened by the alliance, he attacked Koch Bihar's territory of Bahirbandh in 1596 AD. Unable to resist the invaders Lakshmi Narayan sought Mughal help by submitting to Man Singh the governor of Bengal. Subsequent conflicts occurred between the two alliances until Isa Khan submitted to the Mughals. Thus, Raghu Dev was left alone to fight against Koch Bihar. He died in 1603 and was succeeded by Parikshit Narayan. Parikshit attacked the Koch Bihar frontier districts of Bahirband and Bhitarband which pushed up to Salkona River in the south-west. Lakshmi Narayan again sought help to the Mughals. Parikshit eager for an ally gave his daughter in marriage to Ahom king Susenghphaa (r. 1603–1641) in 1608. In the same year, Islam Khan was appointed as the governor of Bengal. He demanded submission of Lakshmi Narayan of Koch Bihar and Parikshit Narayan of Koch Hajo to acknowledge Mughal suzerainty. In 1609, Lakshmi Narayan appeared before Islam Khan in person and officially became a Mughal vassal. However Parikshit Narayan choose to remain independent. Islam Khan dispatched an army by Shaikh Abdul Wahid against Parikshit but was defeated.

In 1612, Islam Khan after conquering Bhati, Sylhet, Jessore and Bakla in Bengal renewed the Kamrup expedition. According to Padshahnama, the conflict was triggered by a complaint from Raja Raghunath, the zamindar of Shusang, (Note: Between Karaibari and the Garo Hills present day Durgapur Upazila, Netrokona) a Mughal vassal, who sought the recovery of his family held in confinement by Parikshit.

== Conquest ==
In December 1612, (Note: The beginning date of the expedition varies. November 1612 December 1612 March 1613) after wrapping up campaigns against the Bara Bhuyans, Islam Khan decided to conquer Koch territory. He sent a large army led by Shaikh Kamal, guided by Raja Raghunath of Sushang, with overall command under Mukarram Khan. They were accompanied by Shaikh Muhi-ud-din and Mirza Iman Quli Beg Shamlu. On 8 December the army reached Tok. Islam Khan ordered Khawaja Tahir Muhammad Bakshi and Abdus Salam to join the army. There the cavalry force proceeded on land and the navy through the Brahmaputra River.

The Mughals assembled an expeditionary force including their full artillery fleet, 500 fully equipped war boats including 100 war boats of Musa Khan under his admiral Adil Khan, armed with large cannons, 1,000 picked cavalry, 5,000 matchlock-men, plus 300 elephants. According to another Persian source, the army comprised 6,000 cavalry, 10,000–12,000 infantry, and 500 boats. A sum of 70,00,000 rupees were paid for the expedition. 22 officers from Bihar, zamindars and mansabdar of Bayazid of Sylhet and Khwaja Usman joined the expedition. According to Baharistan-i-Ghaibi, the vassal zamindars included Raja Satrajit of Bhusna, Bahadur Ghazi, Sona Ghazi, Majlis Bayazid and others. (Note: Baharistan-i-Ghaibi lists the participants in the conquest of Kamrup as follows: Mukarram Khan, 'Abdu's-Salam, Shaykh Muhiu'd-Din, Shaykh Kamal, Mirzā Imam Quli Beg Shāmlū, Mirzā Nathan, Mirzā Mirak Najafi, Mir Ma'sum Khafi, Mirzā Kazim Beg Tusi, Shaykh Habibu'l-lah Fathpūrī, Shaykh Ashraf Hänsīwāl, Tātār Khân Mīwāti, Mirzā Sayfu'd-Din, Shaykh Muhiu'd-Din, Mirzā Hasan Mashhadi, Jamal Khân Mangli; all the Afghans of Sylhet, the Mansabdārs of 'Usman; Saiyid Nizamu'd-Din and Ruknu'd-Din, Saiyid Muhammad Dumriya; Shaykh Isma'il, Mirzā Nuru'l-lah, Mīrzā Azalī and some twenty two other officers of Bihar: the comrades of Mirzā Imām Quli Shamlū, Rāja Raghūnāth, Rāja Satrajit, Bahadur Ghāzī, Sūnā Ghāzi, Islām Quli and Majlis Bāyizīd, son of Khan 'Alam with their entire fleet and artillery; one hundred boats of Müsä Khan and his brothers under the command of his admiral Abdal Khân.)

Raja Parikshit Narayan positioned himself at Salkuna, on the left bank of the Brahmaputra between Patladah and Karaibari. He deployed 300 fully equipped war boats to counter the Mughal fleet. Upon approach of the Mughals, the Kamrup navy launched an attack but was defeated, and a large number of war boats were captured by the imperial forces. Parikshit fled the battlefield to save his life, escaping to places such as Dhubri, Gilah, and others. The Mughals pursued him relentlessly and, with great effort, cleared the surrounding forests in those areas. Parikshit also sought assistance to the Ahom king Susenghphaa (r. 1603–1641). Due to lack of agreements the alliance with Ahom Kingdom could not be formed against the invaders. Thus he had to face the Mughals alone.

=== Siege of Dhubri ===
First, Mirza Nathan subdued the zamindars of Bahirband and Bhitarband. The Mughals then advanced to assault Dhubri fort. A garrison of 500 cavalry and 100 or 10,000 infantry were stationed at the fort. In January 1613, the Mughals suffered two defeats at Dhubri. The imperial troops subsequently resumed the arduous task of clearing the forests around the fort for several more days. Under Shaikh Kamal's guidance the Mughals positioned their artillery and gunners to bombard the enemy inside Dhubri fort effectively. They completely surrounded the fort and maintained strict day-and-night vigilance, anticipating possible night attacks by Raja Parikshit and his men. The besieged attempted to break out, led by Phulguria Fath Khan Salka but in vain. Fath Khan was captured by the Mughal army. In the middle of April 1613, the fort came under Mughal possession after a prolonged siege of three and a half months.

The defeat demoralised Parikshit. The imperial officers suggested to attack Gilah (Gilajhar) situated 10 miles north of Dhubri, but was rejected by Shaikh Kamal. Instead Shaikh Kamal offered peace proposal to Raja Parikshit. In reply, Parikshit accepted the peace terms, submitted to Shaikh Kamal, and pledged obedience. Through envoys, he sent two elephants, other gifts, and 80,000 rupee to Shaikh Kamal. He further agreed to pay 100,000 rupee, along with 100 elephants, 100 piebald tangan horses, and his sister as a bride for Islam Khan. Additionally, he consented to send the Emperor Jahangir (r. 1605–1627) 300,000 rupee, 300 large elephants, 300 high-bred tangan horses, and his daughter as a bride—on the condition that he be exempted from attending the imperial court and allowed to retain his kingdom. Parikshit also agreed to release Raghunath's family. Shaikh Kamal accepted the proposal despite the imperial officers objections. Three days later Parikshit sent 1,000,000 rupee, 100 elephants and 100 tangan horse. Sheikh Kamal along with Mirza Hasan, and Raja Raghunath, reached Dhaka by boat with Parikshit's envoy and met Islam Khan. Islam Khan hearing the matters banished Shaikh Kamal and ordered him to bring Parikshit's submission and conquer Kamrup.

=== War at Gadadhar River ===
Hostilities resumed when Raja Lakshmi Narayan of Koch Bihar, who promised aid against Parikshit, attacked the pargana of Khontaghat on Kamrup's western border. Parikshit marched from Gilah, fought fiercely for seven days, forcing Lakshmi Narayan to seek help. Islam Khan sent Raja Satrajit with 200 war-boats to attack Parikshit from the rear. Satrajit advanced to Kharbuzaghat. (Note: In Mechpara Mauza of Goalpara district) Parikshit then abandoned the fight with Lakshmi Narayan and withdrew to Gilah. The zamindars of the imperial army advanced with their boats and blocked the Gadadhar River by building a fort, causing severe hardship to Raja Parikshit and the city of Gilah. In response, Parikshit planned a night attack on the fort. He dispatched all his boats along with 50 elephants and 700 soldiers under the command of his son-in-law, Dimarua Raja. Meanwhile, Parikshit himself marched against Dhubri fort with his full army of 156,000 paiks (archers), 5,000 cavalry, 5,000 musketeers, and 300 elephants. Dimarua attacked the Mughal post at the mouth of the Gadadhar river with 700 war boats. Sulaiman Sardiwal with 50 war boats was caught off guard on lower ground and was quickly defeated; most soldiers were killed and all boats destroyed. The attackers then stormed the fort. Bahadur Ghazi and other zamindars below the fort with 200 boats and 400 musketeers could not resist and were either killed or captured. The 50 elephants accompanying Dimarua finished off the survivors. After the fort fell, Bahadur Ghazi and Suna Ghazi with only 43 of the original 250 boats. Raja Parikshit reached Dhubri and attacked the fort. Jamal Khan Mangli and Lachmi Rajput were wounded defending the fort. Nitai Chandra Nazir the standard bearer of the Kamrup army led an assault with 4,000 or 5,000 archers which also proved disastrous. Parikshit also led three unsuccessful attempts. The Mughals reorganized themselves inside the fort. Mirza Nathan and Shaikh Kamal positioned strong artillery. Dimarua fresh arrived with his fleet, causing the imperial zamindars' boats to flee. Desperate, Mirza Nathan personally aimed and fired a cannon shot that killed Dimarua. With their commander dead, Parikshit's army fled the battlefield.

After Dimarua's death Raja Parikshit fled to Gilah. Then to his capital Barnagar. Mughals had already occupied it. He abandoned cannons and booty, escaped with family to Pandu. Mughals pursued him with Lakshmi Narayan's help while Raja Satrajit and Mirza Qasim Khazanchi moved along the Brahmaputra. However they could not capture the Kamrup king. By the end of July 1613, Parikshit being worn out surrendered unconditionally yielding his kingdom, possessions, and war elephants in exchange for his life and freedom. Thus Kamrup was annexed to the Mughal Empire.

== Aftermath ==
In July 1613, the Mughal Empire annexed the Kingdom of Koch Hajo or Kamrup. This ended the state's independence and established the first Mughal frontier province bordering the Ahom Kingdom. Mughal frontier stretched from the Karo Bari Hills on the south-west as far as Barnadi River on the west. The Mughals administrated region was called Bilayat Koch—Hajo. It was divided into four Sarkars (districts) and many parganas. A force of 10,000—12,000 soldiers were stationed at Hajo. Returning from Kamrup, the imperial officers learned about Islam Khan's illness. The Subahdar died on 21 August 1613 at Bhawal.

The territories west of the Manas River were assigned to Abdus Salam, while the eastern portion was temporarily managed by Lakshmi Narayan; meanwhile, a Mughal fleet stationed at Pandu protected Bengal supply lines and suppressed local rebellions. Raja Raghunath's family was also freed from captivity.

== See also ==
- Ahom–Mughal conflicts
- Battle of Bharali (1615)
- Battle of Samdhara
- Mir Jumla's invasion of Assam

== Bibliography ==
- Sarkar, Jadunath, ed. (1943). The History of Bengal. Vol. II: Muslim Period. Delhi: B.R. Publishing Corporation. ISBN 81-7646-239-X.
- Roy, Atul Chandra (1968). History of Bengal: Mughal Period, 1526-1765 A.D. Vol. 3. Calcutta: Nababharat Publishers. Archived from the original on 2017-01-23.
- Nag, Sajal, ed. (2024). “The” Mughals and the North-East: Encounter and Assimilation in Medieval India. Routledge Taylor & Francis Group. doi:10.4324/9781003406020. ISBN 1032523050.
- Nath, D. (1989-01-01). History of the Koch Kingdom, C. 1515-1615. Mittal Publications. ISBN 978-81-7099-109-0.
- Barpujari, H. K. (1992), Barpujari, H. K. (ed.), The Comprehensive History of Assam, vol. 2, Guwahati: Assam Publication Board
- Nath, Pratyay (2019-06-28). Climate of Conquest: War, Environment, and Empire in Mughal North India. Oxford University Press. ISBN 978-0-19-909823-1.
- Borah, M. I. (1936). Baharistan-I-Ghaybi. Vol. 1. Gauhati, Assam: Narayani Handiqui Historical Institute.
- Acharyya, Nagendra Nath (1966). The History of Medieval Assam, from the Thirteenth to the Seventeenth Century: A Critical and Comprehensive History of Assam During the First Four Centuries of Ahom Rule, Based on Original Assamese Sources, Available Both in India and England. Dutta Baruah.
