= Mrauk U invasion of Bhulua =

Conflict in southeastern Bengal (1614–1615)

- Part of Mughal–Mrauk U Wars
Date	1614–1615
Location	Bhulua, present day Noakhali
Result	Mughal victory

Belligerents
Mughal Empire	Kingdom of Mrauk U Supported by: Portuguese of Sandwip

Commanders and leaders
Shaikh Abdul Wahid; Shaikh Kamal; Mirza Makki; Mirza Nuruddin	Min Khamaung; Sebastião Gonçalves Tibau (AWOL); Antonio Carvalho

Strength
1614: Unknown; 1615: 2,000 cavalry 3,000 musketeers 700 war-boats 100 elephants	1614: 300,000; 80,000 infantry; 10,000 paiks; 700 elephants; 200 boats; 150 jaliyas; 50 war-boats; 4,000 sailors; 1615: Unknown

Casualties and losses
Unknown	1614: 500 killed 1615: 500 killed; 1,000 wounded

The Mrauk U invasion of Bhulua (1614–1615) comprised two major Arakanese campaigns against the Mughal frontier tract of Bhulua (modern Noakhali District, Bangladesh) under King Min Khamaung (r. 1612–1622). Following Mughal annexation of Bhulua in 1611, the invasions involved joint Arakanese–Portuguese operations with freebooter Sebastião Gonçalves Tibao of Sandwip. In 1614, an allied land and naval force overran Bhulua after Mughal thanadar Abdul Wahid evacuated. The fragile alliance between Min Khamaung and Portuguese officers ensued internal conflicts, allowing Mughal to counterattack, forcing the invaders to retreat to Chittagong. In late 1615, Min Khamaung reoccupied Bhulua unopposed. Mughal reinforcements enabled a counter-charge where many Arakanese, including the king, were trapped in a bog. Defeated, Min Khamaung sued for peace, surrendering officers, troops, and equipment. The campaign marks the beginning of Mughal–Arakanese frontier conflicts, Portuguese mercenary involvement, and tensions until conquest of Chittagong in 1666.

== Background ==
The Arakan king Meng Phalaung (r. 1571–1593) of the Mrauk U kingdom, established his authority over of Chittagong and large portion of Noakhali in Bengal. In 1611, Mughal Subahdar Islam Khan I annexed Bhulua, ruled by Ananta Malikya, who received assistance from Min Razagni (r. 1593–1612). Ananta Malikya sought refuge in Arakan. In January 1612, the Arakanese launched their initial campaign to seize Bhulua, while simultaneously mounting an assault on Sripur and Bikrampur with 300 war boats. The thanadars of these places were unable to resist the plundering. Min Razagni's death triggered war between his son Min Khamaung and Cakrawate, due to internal conflicts, east of Feni River was free from Arakanese invasion.

== Invasion ==
Min Khamaung first entered into an alliance with Sebastião Gonçalves Tibau. In 1614 AD, frontier thanah of Bhulua faced a joint attack by Min Khamaung, the king of Arakan, and the Portuguese freebooter (Note: These Portuguese pirates are also called Feringis) Sebastian Gonzales Tibao, the master of Sandwip. The army composed of 300,000 in total had 80,000 infantry, mainly musketeers, 10,000 paiks and 700 war elephants. The land army was under the command of Min Khamaung while Gonzales led the combined Magh-Feringi fleet of 200 boats (150 jaliyas, 50 war-boats) and 4,000 sailors. The thanadar of Bhulua, Abdul Wahid was at Jahangirnagar while his son was hard-pressed in Tripura campaign. Qasim Khan urged to take action, but Abdul Wahid lacking the courage abandoned Bhulua and retreated into the Machwa-khal, avoiding battle.

Hence, Bhulua remained exposed to the Arakanese and Portuguese pirates, who plundered and devastated the region. Arakanese land forces crossed the Feni rivers, occupied Bhulua, and looted inland areas unopposed. Their fleet advanced up the Meghna to the Dakatia River, ravaging both banks. When Mughal defeat seemed imminent, the fragile Magh-Feringi alliance collapsed. The Arakan king treacherously imprisoned Portuguese general Antonio Carvalho's nephew and other officers, believing that holding Carvalho's nephew would neutralize his fleet. In retaliation, the Portuguese plundered the Arakanese boats, captured many naval personnel, and sailed to Sandwip, abandoning the Arakanese. This left the Arakanese vulnerable. Mughal commander Abdul Wahid with Shaikh Kamal and Mirza Makki crossed the Dakatia canal and assaulted the enemy fort. Unable to resist, the Arakanese abandoned it and fled to Chittagong. Thus, the Arakanese invasion in December 1614 ended in complete failure. According to Bocarro, Sebastian Gonzales betrayed the Arakanese. He murdered the Arakanese naval commanders and seized control of their fleet. Bocarro further suspects that the Mughals paid Gonzales to withdraw from the battle. According to the Baharistan-i-Ghaybi, the Mughals captured 500 Arakanese soldiers and a large number of elephants.

By October 1615, Min Khamaung had repelled attack by Portuguese Goa and made peaceful truce with Burmese king Maha Dhamma Raja. The Arakanese king then renewed his assault on the Mughal frontier tract of Bhulua. Abdul Wahid again evacuated Bhulua and, without awaiting reinforcements sent by Qasim Khan at Khizrpur. The Arakan king once again occupied all of Bhulua unopposed and relentlessly pursued the retreating Mughal forces. Abd-un-Nabi was dispatched to aid the thanadar with 2,000 cavalry, 3,000 musketeers, 700 war-boats and 100 elephants. Mirza Nuruddin, son of Abdul Wahid, together with other resolute Mughal officers, launched a determined counter charge against the advancing Arakanese forces. The Mughal forces were aided by a large bog near the battlefield, into which many pursuing Arakanese troops fell during their advance. Although a small number of invading troops succeeded in crossing the obstacle, the Min Khamaung himself became mired in the bog. He was quickly surrounded by Mughal soldiers. In the ensuing clash, 500 were killed and double of that fled wounded. The king sued peace which was accepted by the imperial commander in exchange of surrender of all Arakanese officers, including the king's nephew, his troops and other war equipments.

== Aftermath ==
Min Khamaung was allowed to return to Chittagong. Abdul Wahid with his officers returned to Bhulua in January 1616 AD. In 1617, Qasim Khan later carried offensive campaign in Chittagong against Kingdom of Mrauk U under the command of Emperor Jahangir. The outcome of the expedition ended in failure.

== See also ==
- Mughal conquest of Sylhet
- Mughal conquest of Chittagong
- Mrauk U invasion of Chittagong

== Bibliography ==
- Borah, M. I. (1936). "CHAPTER IX.". Baharistan-I-Ghaybi. Vol. 1. Gauhati, Assam: Narayani Handiqui Historical Institute.
- Sarkar, Jadunath, ed. (1943). The History of Bengal. Vol. II: Muslim Period. Delhi: B.R. Publishing Corporation. ISBN 81-7646-239-X.
- Roy, Atul Chandra (1968). History of Bengal: Mughal Period, 1526-1765 A.D. Vol. 3. Calcutta: Nababharat Publishers. Archived from the original on 2017-01-23.
- Galen, S.E.A. van (2008). Arakan and Bengal : the rise and decline of the Mrauk U kingdom (Burma) from the fifteenth to the seventeeth century AD. Archived from the original on 2019-11-25.
