= Mughal campaign of Tripura =

Mughal–Tripura War (1618)

- Part of Mughal conquest of Bengal
Date	November 1618
Location	Twipra Kingdom
Result	Mughal victory
Territorial changes	Twipra Kingdom annexed by the Mughal Empire

Belligerents
Mughal Empire	Twipra Kingdom

Commanders and leaders
Mirza Isfandiyar Khan; Mirza Nur-ud-din; Musa Khan; Bahadur Khan	Yashodhar Manikya (POW)

Strength
5,700 or 6,000 cavalry 9,000 matchlock 70 elephants 300 war boats	1,000 cavalry 60,000 infantry 200 elephants Unknown boats

Casualties and losses
Many killed	70 elephants captured; many killed

The Mughal campaign of Tripura (1618) was a military expedition launched by the Mughal Empire under Ibrahim Khan Fath-i-Jang, the Subahdar of Bengal to conquer the Kingdom of Tripura. The campaign resulted in the defeat of Raja Yashodhar Manikya (r. 1613–1618) and the temporary annexation of Tripura. Motivated largely by the desire to capture Tripura's renowned war elephants and horses, the Mughals invaded with a combined land and riverine force. The army was divided into two divisions under Mirza Isfandiyar Khan and Mirza Nur-ud-din with Musa Khan, supported by a fleet of 300 war boats commanded by Admiral Bahadur Khan. Despite fierce resistance, including night attacks and attempts to block Mughal advances with river fortifications, Tripura forces were defeated in successive engagements. Udaipur, the capital, fell to the Mughals. King Yasodhar Manikya was captured along with his family, treasures, and remaining elephants. The conquest brought Tripura under Mughal control for a short period before local rule was later restored.

== Background ==
During Yashodhar Manikya's reign Ibrahim Khan Fath-i-Jang led the Mughal invasion of Tripura on the orders of Emperor Jahangir (r. 1605–1627). According to the Rajamala, the primary motive behind the invasion was Jahangir's desire to acquire Tripura's renowned horses and elephants, which were highly valued for military use. This is corroborated by Abul Fazl, who praised the superior quality of Tripura's elephants. The Mughals required these animals to strengthen their forces for both defence and offensive campaigns. Raja Yashodhar Manikya, a devout Vaishnava opposed to warfare, was not expected to offer strong resistance.

== Campaign ==
In 1618, Ibrahim Khan organized the invading land army into two divisions: one commanded by Mirza Isfandiyar Khan and the other by Mirza Nur-ud-din and Musa Khan. Isfandiyar Khan's division consisted of over 2,700 cavalry, 4,000 matchlock men, and 20 elephants. The second division under Nur-ud-din and Musa Khan comprised more than 3,000 cavalry, 5,000 matchlock men, and 50 elephants. In addition, a naval fleet of 300 well-equipped war boats was dispatched under the command of Admiral Bahadur Khan to advance through the Gomti River.

Isfandiyar Khan's division advanced towards Tripura via Kailagad near present-day Kasba, while the second division under Nur-ud-din and Musa Khan marched towards the capital Udaipur, via 19 miles west near Meherkul. Yashodhar Manikya decided to engage the two Mughal forces separately. He launched a surprise night attack on Isfandiyar Khan's division with 1,000 cavalry, 60,000 infantry, and 200 elephants. Although the Tripura army fought fiercely, the Mughals emerged victorious. Heavy casualties were suffered on both sides, and Yashodhar Manikya was forced to retreat to Udaipur with heavy losses. The Mughal forces captured 70 elephants from the Tripura army.

Meanwhile, the second Mughal division under Nur-ud-din and Musa Khan was advancing. While retreating to Udaipur after his defeat by Isfandiyar Khan, Yashodhar Manikya suddenly encountered this division. He launched a desperate surprise attack on the sleeping Mughal soldiers but was defeated once again. Upon reaching Udaipur, the king sent his fleet by river and an army by land to oppose the Mughal navy. Despite Tripura's the attempts to block the advance, the Mughals broke through and captured Udaipur. With the fall of the capital, Tripura was conquered. Yashodhar Manikya fled in the morning. After three days of search, he was captured in the forest along with his wives, children and vast treasures. The Mughals also seized all the remaining elephants of the Tripura king.

== Aftermath ==
Yashodhar Manikya was sent prisoner first to Dhaka and then to Delhi. Following this conquest completed in November 1618, Bengal enjoyed peace for two and half years till October 1620 as the Mughals secured a base against the Arakanese. Its capital Udaipur was turned into a Mughal outpost under Mirza Nurullah. Later Ibrahim Khan visited the country of Tripura. Yasodhar Manikya died in 1623. Following a plague in 1625 the Mughals were forced to retreat and Kalyan Manikya (r. 1625–1659) crowned himself to the throne. He defeated the Mughals in many battles. In 1658, Kalyan Manikya was finally defeated by Shah Shuja. This landmark loss forced Tripura to pay tribute to foreign power for the first time, with the Meharkal Comilla region assessed at a tribute of Rs. 99,860.

== See also ==
- Mughal conquest of Kamrup
- Mughal campaign of Kachar
- Mughal Central Asia campaign

== Bibliography ==
- Borah, M. I. (1936). Baharistan-I-Ghaybi. Vol. 2. Gauhati, Assam: Narayani Handiqui Historical Institute.
- Sarkar, Jadunath, ed. (1943). The History of Bengal. Vol. II: Muslim Period. Delhi: B.R. Publishing Corporation. ISBN 81-7646-239-X.
- Roy, Atul Chandra (1968). History of Bengal: Mughal Period, 1526-1765 A.D. Vol. 3. Calcutta: Nababharat Publishers. Archived from the original on 2017-01-23.
- Sarma, Ramani Mohan (1986). A political History of Tripura. Calcutta: Puthipatra.
- Nath, Pratyay (2019-06-28). Climate of Conquest: War, Environment, and Empire in Mughal North India. Oxford University Press. ISBN 978-0-19-909823-1.
- Saigal, Omesh (1978). Tripura, Its History and Culture. Concept.
