= Abdul Lutif =

Abdul Lutif was a Mughal historian. He wrote a travel diary about his journey from Agra to Bengal through Bihar. His diary has become an important source for historians.

== Early life ==
Lutif was born in Ahmedabad, Gujarat, to Abdullah Abbasi. His father was an official in the court of the Gujarat Sultanate.

== Career ==
Lutif was a Mughal royal official in Ahmedabad.

Lutif traveled from Rajmahal, the former capital of Bengal Subah, to Ghoraghat in 1609. He traveled with the Mughal subahdar (governor) Islam Khan I and Dewan Abul Hasan Shihab Khani Mutaqid Khan, under whom Lutif served, as part of a royal entourage. The diary records their various stops on their way to Ghoraghat. The diary ends on 15 October 1609 when they reach Ghoraghat and Islam Khan I continues his journey towards southern Bengal. He continued to write but the full diary has not been found.

== Legacy ==
Mirza Nathan mentions Lutif as his friend in his book about Bengal, Baharistan-i-Ghaibi, describing him as an official at the Diwani office (revenue officer).

Historian Sir Jadunath Sarkar discovered the diary of Lutif, narrating his travels from Rajmahal to Ghoraghat, and translated it into English. Sarkar describes Lutif as an official during the reign of Mughal Emperor Jahangir. Despite only a small portion of the diary being discovered it provides an important glimpse for historians studying Medieval Bengal.
