= Qubazpur =

Qubāzpūr was a town and pargana in western Bengal during the time of the Mughal Empire; the pargana at least also continued to exist under the British Raj. Its exact location is unknown, but its approximate location was in present-day Purba Bardhaman district, somewhere between Samudragarh and Katwa.

== History ==
The Ain-i Akbari listed Qubazpur as a mahal in sarkar Sulaimanabad. Its assessed revenue was 1,589,332 dams. Irfan Habib also identifies Qubazpur with the town of "Cubbadgepore" mentioned by the 17th-century British agent John Marshall in his diary. Marshall, who passed through Qubazpur in May 1671, described it as being one stage north of Samudragarh ("Summudgur") and four stages south of Ghazipur; he also noted the presence of a sarāī, or inn for travellers. Later, in the 1800s, John Beames identified Qubazpur as the name of a pargana in what is now Purba Bardhaman district, comprising "70 villages scattered along the left bank of the Hugli river" both north and south of Purbasthali.
