= Mughal conquest of Bhulua =

1611 conflict in southeastern Bengal

- Part of Mughal conquest of Bengal
Date	1611 (Note: Conquest of Bhulua happened shortly before Musa Khan's submission to Mughals in July 1611)
Location	Bhulua
Result	Mughal victory
Territorial changes	Bhulua Kingdom annexed to the Mughal Empire

Belligerents
Mughal Empire	Bhulua Kingdom; Supported by: Mrauk-U Kingdom

Commanders and leaders
Islam Khan I Shaikh Abdul Wahid; Mirza Nuruddin; Mirza Isfandiyar; Shamsuddin Baghdadi; Khwaja Asl; Adil Beg; Mirza Beg	Ananta Manikya; Mirza Yusuf Barlas (surrendered)

Strength
3,000 matchlocker 4,000 cavalry 50 elephants	Unknown

The Mughal Conquest of Bhulua was 17th-century Mughal conquest of the Bhulua Kingdom, which covered much of the present-day Noakhali region of Bangladesh. The campaign was led by Shaykh Abdul Wahid, under the orders of Islam Khan I, against Raja Ananta Manikya in 1611. The conquest of Bhulua allowed the Mughals to successfully penetrate through southeastern Bengal and conquer Chittagong and parts of Arakan.

== Background ==
The Noakhali region was historically known as Bhulua and was ruled by the Bishwambhar Sur dynasty, an independent line of Hindu kings who enjoyed autonomy under the Sultanate of Bengal. The Mughal Empire defeated the Sultanate at the Battle of Rajmahal on 12 July 1576, formally establishing the Bengal as the easternmost province of the subcontinent-wide empire. However, the collapse of the Sultanate led to the formation of the Baro-Bhuiyans; a loose confederacy of independent chieftains across Bengal who continued to challenge Mughal domination.

During the reign of Emperor Akbar, Raja Man Singh I (r. 1594–1606) was the appointed Subahdar of Bengal and responsible for warding off rebellious chieftains in the region. The Bhulua Kingdom was then under the rule of Raja Lakshmana Manikya. Lakshmana was among the Baro-Bhuiyans of Bengal, and was succeeded by his son, Ananta Manikya.

== Campaign ==
In 1608, Emperor Jahangir appointed Islam Khan I as the Subahdar of Bengal, who continued his predecessors' campaigns to subdue the Baro-Bhuiyans and completely annex all of Bengal to the Mughal Empire.

In 1611 following Islam Khan's submission of Musa Khan in east Bengal, he sent Abdul Wahid was appointed as the main commander of the Bhulua expedition by the Subahdar of Bengal Islam Khan. He had command over 50 elephants, 3,000 matchlockers and 4,000 cavalries (including 500 of the Subahdar's own cavalry), in addition to the forces of Mirza Nuruddin, Mirza Isfandiyar, Haji Shamsuddin Baghdadi, Khwaja Asl, Adil Beg and Mirza Beg. Ananta Manikya received help from Mrauk-U king Min Razagyi, began to set up defences around Bhulua with the 's assistance, before proceeding forward to the Dakatia banks where he built a fort. Abdul Wahid's army reached the fort in a few days, and a battle commenced resulting in a number of deaths on both sides.

Manikya's forces had also planned a surprise attack at night. However, the raja's chief minister, Mirza Yusuf Barlas, surrendered to Abdul Wahid, who rewarded him as a mansabdar of 500 soldiers and 300 horses. Manikya did not surrender after losing Barlas, and rather retreated to Bhulua at midnight to strengthen the fort there. News of the retreat reached the Mughals two pahars later, and so they began following the raja's forces. Having no time to defend themselves, Manikya retreated further to seek refuge with the Magh king Min Razagyi of Arakan but was defeated at the banks of the Feni River. The Mughals seized all of Manikya's elephants, and Abdul Wahid successfully took control of Bhalwa in 1613.

== Aftermath ==
In January 1612, the Arakanese tried to take control of Bhulua also attacked Sripur. Under Subahdar Islam Khan I, Bhalwa and Jagdia were established as frontier garrisons as the Mughals were aware of its strategic location as a crossroad between Mughal Bengal and Chittagong, then under the Arakanese kingdom. The Mughals also made Bhulua into a strong naval garrison to deter piracy from the Portuguese and Arakanese which was still causing great havoc along the coast. Bhalwa was integrated into the Sarkar of Sonargaon. Members of the Bishwambhar Sur family were allowed to remain as zamindars. The fall of Bhulua also compelled Musa Khan, the main remaining Baro-Bhuiyan ruler, to also surrender to Islam Khan, and the rest of the Baro-Bhuiyans were subdued soon afterwards.

== See also ==
- History of Noakhali
- Mirza Baqi, thanadar of Bhalwa

== Bibliography ==
- Bhattasali, Nalini Kanta (1928). "Bengal Chiefs' Struggle for independence in the reign of Akbar & Jahangir". Bengal, Past & Present. 35. Calcutta Historical Society.
- Bhattasali, Nalini Kanta (1942). "Early days of Mughal rule in Dacca". Islamic Culture. XVI.
- Bhattacharya, Dinesh Chandra (1934). "A forgotten family of royal poets: The Sura kings of Bhulua". Bengal, Past & Present. 48. Calcutta Historical Society.
- D'Hubert, Thibaut; Leider, Jacques P (2011). Traders and Poets at the Mrauk U Court: Commerce and Cultural Links in Seventeenth-Century Arakan. Pelagic Passageways.
- Galen, S.E.A. van (2008). "The rise of Mrauk U influence". Arakan and Bengal : the rise and decline of the Mrauk U kingdom (Burma) from the fifteenth to the seventeenth century AD.
- Ghoshal, Sarat Chandra (1942). A History of Cooch Behar (from the earliest times to the end of the eighteenth century A.D.). State Press of Cooch Behar.
- Borah, M. I. (1936). "Expedition starts against Ananta Manik". Baharistan-I-Ghaybi. Vol. 1. Gauhati, Assam: Narayani Handiqui Historical Institute.
- Webster, John Edward (1911). Eastern Bengal and Assam District Gazetteers. Vol. 4. Noakhali. Allahabad: The Pioneer Press.
- Sarkar, Jadunath (1948). "XIV. Conquests of Islām Khan (1606–1613)". The History of Bengal. Vol. II.
- Bhattacharya, S. N. (November 1935). "On the Transfer of the Capital of Mughal Bengal from Raj Mahal to Dacca (Jahangirnagar) By Islam Khan Chishti". The Dacca University Studies. 1. Brindabon Dhar and Sons Ltd.
- Roy, Atul Chandra (1968). History of Bengal: Mughal Period (1526–1765). Calcutta: Nababharat Publishers.
- Roy, Atul Chandra (1961). "Naval Strategy of the Mughals in Bengal". Proceedings of the Indian History Congress. 24. ISSN 2249-1937. JSTOR 44140736.
