= Mughal conquest of Jessore =

1611–1612 Mughal military campaign

- Part of Mughal conquest of Bengal
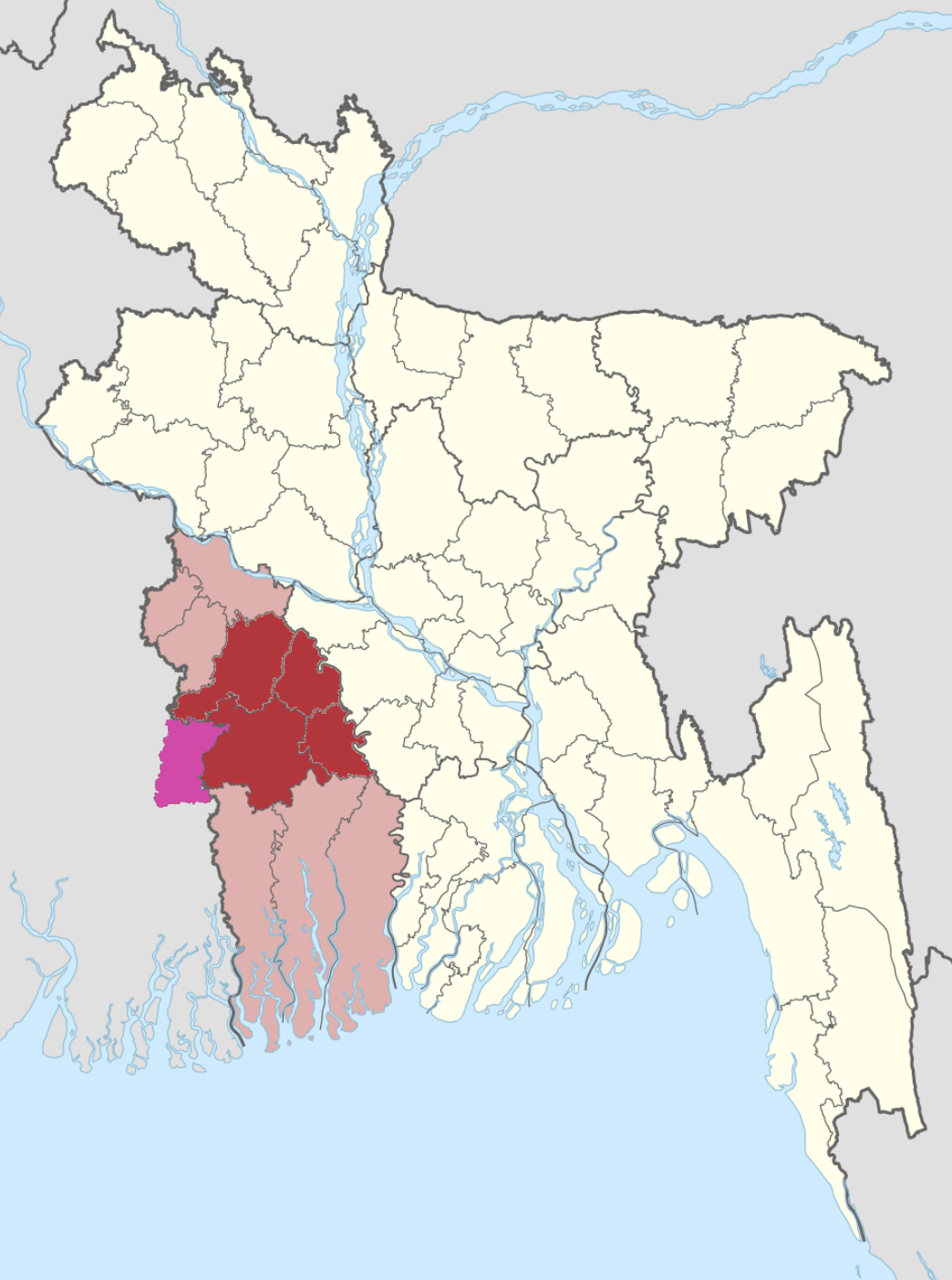
- Jessore, partitioned between Bangladesh and West Bengal
Date	December 1611 – January 1612
Location	Jessore
Result	Mughal victory
Territorial changes	Jessore annexed to the Mughal Empire.

Belligerents
Mughal Empire; Kingdom of Amber	Kingdom of Jessore

Commanders and leaders
Man Singh I Islam Khan I	Pratapaditya (surrendered) (POW); Udayaditya (POW); Khwaja Kamal †; Jamal Khan

The Mughal conquest of Jessore in 1611–1612 was a military campaign by the Mughal Empire against the rebellious Zamindar of Jessore, Pratapaditya. Jessore was a vassal of the Mughal Empire, and the campaign against Pratapaditya was prompted by his refusal to support the Mughals in suppressing the rebellion of the Zamindars in Bengal.

The Mughal forces achieved victory over the Jessore forces in a naval battle at Salka in 1611 and subsequently laid siege to the Jessore fort in 1612. Mughal forces under Man Singh I and Islam Khan I captured Pratapaditya and sent him to Delhi.

== Background ==
In 1576, the Mughal Empire emerged victorious in the Battle of Rajmahal, effectively bringing an end to the Bengal Sultanate. Following this conquest, the Mughals annexed the Bengal region and established the Bengal Subah.

Jessore was a vassal state of the Mughal Empire. In 1609, Pratapaditya, the ruler of Jessore submitted to Islam Khan I, the Subahdar of Bengal by offering acknowledging their vassalage and pledging military support to the Mughal Empire.

In 1611, a rebellion against the Mughal Empire broke out involving 12 Zamindars in Bengal, with Musa Khan among them. Pratapaditya, who had previously been an ally of the Mughal Empire, chose not to support the Mughals in quelling this rebellion. As a result, after successfully suppressing the rebellion, Islam Khan led an expedition toward Jessore to subjugate the Kingdom of Pratapaditya.

== The battle of Salka ==
Around the middle of December 1611, Islam Khan set out on his expedition. The Mughal army was composed of one thousand elite cavalry under the command of Ghiyas Khan and Man Singh. Additionally, it included a substantial force of mansabdars (Mughal nobility) and other officers, five thousand matchlock-men, three hundred fully equipped imperial war-boats, and artillery overseen by Ihtimam Khan.

The Mughal army advanced towards Jessore, following the Bhairab and Ichhamati rivers, eventually arriving at a location known as Salka, near the junction of the Yamumna and Ichhamati rivers. It was here that the initial encounter between Pratapaditya's Jessore army and the Mughal forces occurred. As the Mughal army approached the territory of Jessore, Pratapaditya took significant measures to fortify his capital and positioned a formidable army and fleet under the leadership of experienced officers, which included individuals of foreign origin such as Feringis (Europeans) and Afghans.

Pratapaditya deployed his forces strategically in response to the Mughal advance. He sent his son, Udayaditya, accompanied by Khwaja Kamal and 500 war boats. In addition, another contingent led by Jamal Khan was dispatched, consisting of forty war elephants and one thousand horsemen. Initially, the Jessore forces did not initiate any aggressive action, prompting Islam Khan to advance with his Mughal forces toward them.

Udayaditya's forces secured an initial victory. However, the tide turned against them when the Mughal army unleashed a barrage of arrows, effectively surrounding the Jessore squadron forces. In the midst of this confrontation, Jessore's commander, Khwaja Kamal, lost his life. Udayaditya was compelled to retreat and narrowly escaped being captured by the Mughals.

Following the retreat of Udayaditya, Jamal Khan decided to vacate the fort of Salka. Subsequently, the fort of Salka came under Mughal control. This victory allowed the Mughals to acquire a substantial portion of Jessore's artillery, further strengthening their position in the conflict.

== Fall of Jessore ==
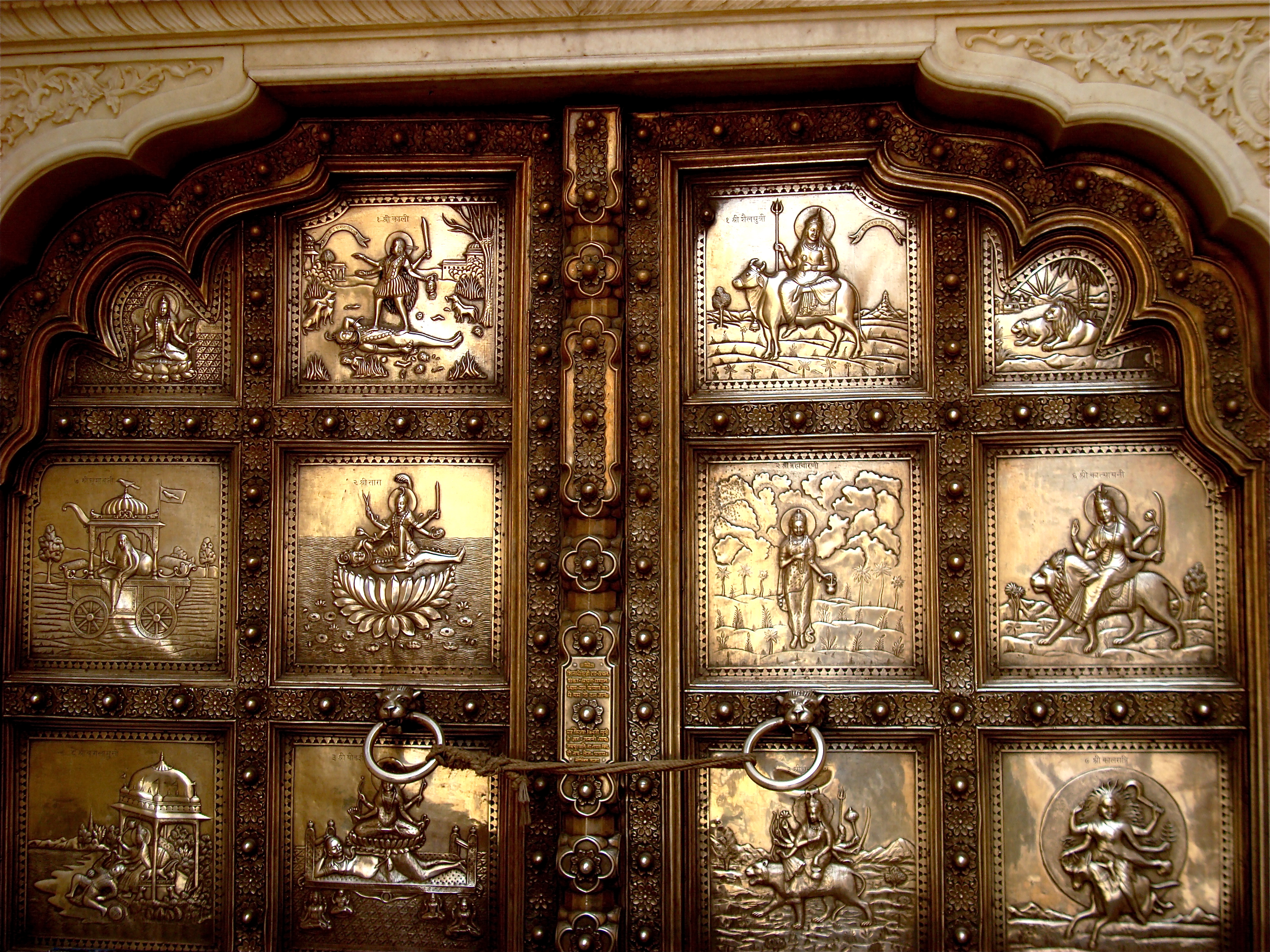
Idol brought by Man Singh from Jessore

Subsequently, the Mughal army proceeded to confront another rebel leader, Ramachandra of Bakla. However, without offering any resistance, Ramachandra surrendered to the Mughals, avoiding a battle.

Pratapaditya attempted to seek peace by sending an envoy to Mirza Nathan, a Mughal commander. However, the Mughals viewed this gesture with suspicion and, as a result, advanced toward the Jessore fort with the intention of laying siege to it.

In January 1612, the Mughal forces initiated a siege on the Jessore fort, compelling Pratapaditya to surrender. Pratapaditya and his sons were captured and subsequently sent to the imperial court. By this event, Mughals successfully captured Jessore and annexed it directly into the rule of Bengal Subah.
