= Nalini Kanta Bhattasali =

Indian historian (1888–1947)

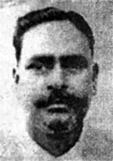
- Bhattasali in an undated photograph
- Born: 24 January 1888; Bikrampur, Bengal Presidency, British India
- Died: 6 February 1947 (aged 59)
- Known for: the first curator of Dhaka Museum

Nalini Kanta Bhattasali (24 January 1888 – 6 February 1947) was an Indian Bengali historian, archaeologist, numismatist, epigraphist and antiquarian.

== Career ==
Bhattasali completed his master's degree in 1912. He then joined the Comilla Victoria College as a teacher in history. After that he joined Balurghat High School as its headmaster. In July 1914, he joined Dhaka Museum (later Bangladesh National Museum) as its curator, a position he held until his death in 1947. He wrote reports and research papers on the contribution of important objects to the history and chronology of ancient Bengal. East Bengal (Vanga-Samatata) was his special field of study.

Bhattasali wrote a few books on Bangla literature. A collection of his short stories, "Hashi o Asru" was published in 1915 and his edition of the first book of a unique manuscript of the Krittivasi Ramayan in 1936. He taught Bengali literature, paleography, and history at the University of Dhaka.
