= Bornadi River =

River in Assam, India

Barnadi River Oontany
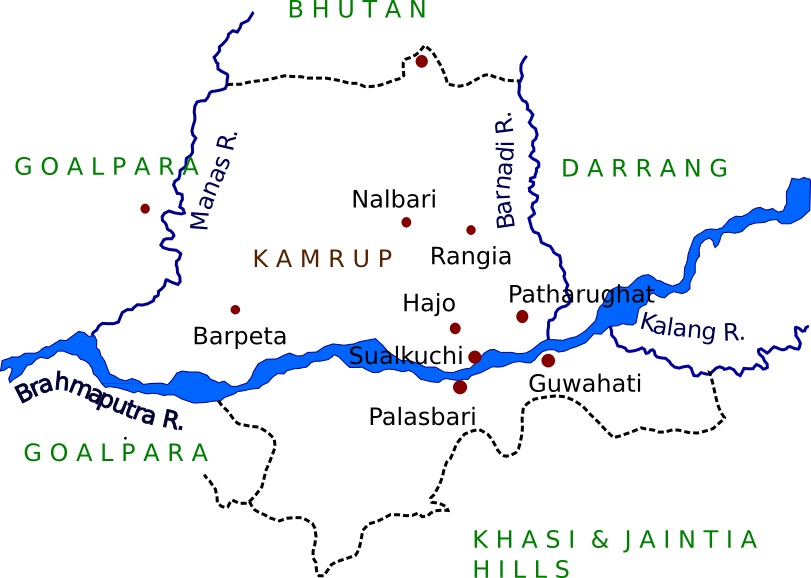
- The undivided Kamrup District of the British Raj

Physical characteristics
- Source: North Bhutan
- Mouth: Brahmaputra River

The Bornadi River is in the State of Assam in India.

In British India, the river separated the Kamrup district and Darrang district. It originates from the Bara/Boro/Bada River.
