= Salimabad, Purba Bardhaman =

Village in West Bengal, India

Salimabad Salīmābād Sulaimānābād
- Village
- Location in West Bengal, India
- Coordinates: 23.0790°N 87.9968°E
- Country: India
- State: West Bengal
- District: Purba Bardhaman district
- Block: Jamalpur

Area
  - Total: 3.422 km^{2} (1.321 sq mi)

Population (2011)
  - Total: 5,491
  - Density: 1,605/km^{2} (4,156/sq mi)

Languages
- Time zone: UTC+5:30 (IST)
- PIN: 713408

Salimabad is a village in Jamalpur block of Purba Bardhaman district, West Bengal, India. It is located on the east bank of the Damodar River, about 20 miles (32 km) south of the city of Bardhaman. Historically known as Sulaimanabad, it was the capital of a sarkar of Mughal Bengal. Today, the primary economic activities in the village are growing rice and producing cloth. As of 2011, Salimabad has a population of 5,491, in 1,282 households.

== Geography ==
Salimabad is located on the east bank of the Damodar River, about 20 miles (32 km) south of the city of Bardhaman. The Kānā Nadī canal is drawn off from the river here.

== History ==
Salimabad was originally named Sulaimanabad, after Sulaiman Khan Karrani, who ruled the Bengal Sultanate from 1565 to 1572. In the late 1500s, Sulaimanabad was listed in the Ain-i Akbari as the seat of a sarkar under subah Bengal. The sarkar contained 31 mahals, of which Haveli Sulaimanabad (i.e. the suburban district around the city) was one. The entire sarkar had an assessed revenue of 17,629,964 dams, and it supplied a force of 5,000 infantry and 100 cavalry. The mahal of Haveli Sulaimanabad was assessed at a revenue of 2,051,090 dams.

At some point after the Ain-i Akbari's compilation, the name Sulaimanabad was truncated to Salimabad. According to Heinrich Blochmann, the change in name may have been simply because the old name was "too long", or it may have been to honour the emperor Jahangir, who was originally named Salim. Irfan Habib notes that this is not a one-off phenomenon – several other places named in the Ain have also undergone a change from "Sulaiman" to "Salim" since the Ain was written.

== Demographics ==
According to the 2011 Census of India, Salimabad had a population of 5,491, in 1,282 households.

== Economy ==
The 2011 census listed two main commodities produced in Salimabad: rice and cloth. Sari weaving followed the two as the village's third-most important economic activity. No regular market or weekly haat was listed as meeting here, and there were no banks or agricultural credit societies.

== Infrastructure ==
According to the 2011 census, the village of Salimpur had 1 primary health sub-centre, 2 primary schools, and 1 secondary school. There was no library or post office, nor any public restrooms. Drinking water was mainly drawn from wells or tanks. Access to electricity was present but limited.

== Transport ==
There is no bus service to Salimpur, and there is no train station in the village. Streets are mainly made of kachcha materials.
