= Sarhad Khan =

Mughal general (c. 17th century)

Shaykh Abdul Wahid Sarhad Khan

Administrator of Bhalwa
- Monarch: Jahangir
- Governor: Islam Khan I Qasim Khan Chishti; Ibrahim Khan Fath-i-Jang
- Preceded by: Ananta Manikya (as Raja of Bhulua)
- Succeeded by: Mirza Baqi

Shaykh ʿAbdul Wāḥid (Persian: شیخ عبد الواحد, Bengali: শেখ আব্দুল ওয়াহেদ) was a military general of the Mughal Empire during the reign of Jahangir, and played an important role in defeating Bahadur Ghazi, who was among the rebellious Baro-Bhuiyans of Bengal. He is celebrated as the Mughal conqueror of Bhulua (modern-day Noakhali, Bangladesh) as he was the chief commander of its expedition. His administration of the Bhulua frontier involved suppressing multiple Arakanese invasions, later earning him the title of Sarḥad Khān (Persian: سرحد خان, lit. 'Khan of the border').

== Career ==
The Mughal subahdar (governor) of Bengal, Islam Khan Chishti, appointed Abdul Wahid as the main commander of the campaign against Raja Parikshit Narayan of Koch Hajo. Sudhindra Nath Bhattacharyya gathers from his sources that Abdul Wahid was successful in his campaign, and that it was Parikshit who set off for Jahangirnagar, the provincial capital, via Fatehpur, to seek redress. However, according to the Baharistan-i-Ghaibi by Mirza Nathan, Abdul Wahid was defeated due to his excessive drinking and inexperience, and fled to Fatehpur instead of returning to Chishti. Chishti was said to have sent a report to the Mughal emperor Jahangir at Delhi, and a firman permitted Abdul Wahid to be punished accordingly. Abdul Wahid was freed from the chains three days later.

During the confrontation with Musa Khan at Dakchara, Chishti entrusted 200 of his horsemen under Abdul Wahid. He later joined Chishti at the Mohana of the Kutharuiya (modern-day Kirtinasha, tributary of the Padma) from where the Governor captured Jatrapur shortly after. Following this, Khan immediately ordered Abdul Wahid, as well as Mirak Bahadur Jalair, Shir Khan Tarin and Bayazid Khan Pani, to also cross the Isamati and secure the Mohana of Dakchara. Abdul Wahid and his associates were also successful in defeating the rebels at Dakchara that had put many obstacles at an attempt to stop the Mughals. Abdul Wahid was noted for his maturity when intervening in a quarrel that emerged between Mirza Nathan and Iftikhar Khan over who is to be credited for the Dakchara victory in which Abdul Wahid brought about peace. The next campaign which Abdul Wahid took part in was to Kalakopa. Along with Ihtimam Khan, he took the land route, stationed left of the fleet. During the battle, Abdul Wahid was in charge of thirty boats. Following the victory, he was rewarded with a shawl for his hard work.

=== Conquest of Bhulua ===
Abdul Wahid was appointed as the main commander of the Bhulua expedition by the Subahdar of Bengal Islam Khan I. He had command over 50 elephants, 3000 matchlockers and 4000 cavalry (including 500 of the Subahdar's own cavalry), in addition to the forces of Mirza Nuruddin, Mirza Isfandiyar, Haji Shamsuddin Baghdadi, Khwaja Asl, Adil Beg and Mirza Beg. The local raja, Ananta Manikya, began to set up defences around Bhulua with the Magh king's assistance, before proceeding forward to the Dakatia banks where he built a fort. Abdul Wahid's army reached the fort in a few days, and a battle commenced resulting in a number of deaths on both sides.

Manikya's forces had also planned a surprise attack at night. However, the raja's chief minister, Mirza Yusuf Barlas, surrendered to Abdul Wahid, who rewarded him as a mansabdar of 500 soldiers and 300 horses. Manikya did not surrender after losing Barlas, and rather retreated to Bhulua at midnight to strengthen the fort there. News of the retreat reached the Mughals two pahars later, and so they began following the raja's forces. Having no time to defend themselves, Manikya retreated further to seek refuge with the Magh king Min Razagyi of Arakan but was defeated at the banks of the Feni River. The Mughals seized all of Manikya's elephants, and Abdul Wahid successfully took control of Bhalwa.

=== Campaign against Baro-Bhuiyans ===
Prior to Abdul Wahid's conquest of Bhulua, he was commanded by Islam Khan Chishti to go to Chowra and defeat Bahadur Ghazi. Ghazi had eventually surrendered to him after the repeated defeats of Musa Khan, and Abdul Wahid was granted a jagir as a reward. After the surrender of Musa Khan in 1609, the next main target rebel of the Mughal Empire was Khwaja Usman of Bokainagar, who was the leader of the Afghans in Bengal. Shaykh Abdul Wahid led the expedition from Hasanpur (modern-day Haybatnagar) along with Shaykh Kamal. The army was instructed to build numerous forts, one every five days. In the meantime, Anwar Khan of Baniachong surrendered and pretended to offer help to the Mughals against Usman, to which Governor Islam Khan Chishti agreed. However, this was a plot of Anwar Khan which he sent a letter to Musa Khan's brother Mahmud, telling him to inform Usman and other rebels of his plans in kidnapping the Mughal officers with Bahadur Ghazi's (who had earlier surrendered to Abdul Wahid) help and taking them to Baniachong - the final Baro-Bhuiyan stronghold in Bengal. Anwar then invited some Mughal officers to a banquet in which he kidnapped two officers and subsequently fled to Baniachong. He was eventually defeated by the Mughals and pleaded for ceasefire. Abdul Wahid and others decided to chain Mahmud Khan and Bahadur Ghazi up, and send them off to Chishti who was at Toke.

=== Administrating Bhulua ===
During the governorship of Qasim Khan Chishti, Abdul Wahid was faced with a number of raids from the Arakanese Maghs. On one occasion, he sent his son on a mission to raid Tripura whilst he himself set off to meet with the Governor Qasim Khan Chishti at Jahangirnagar. He entrusted a Mutasaddi to take care of Bhalwa on his behalf. Effectively, the Magh Raja Min Khamaung set off for Bhalwa with a large army of cavalry, elephants, artillery and infantry. Khamaung also had a large fleet which he ordered to join their ally Sebastian Gonzales, the Portuguese ruler of Sandwip. The Mutasaddi sent a messenger to Abdul Wahid, warning him of the raid, but Chishti thought it was probably an excuse for Abdul Wahid to leave his presence. After further warnings from the thanadars of both Bikrampur and Sripur, Chishti finally granted Abdul Wahid permission to leave. The Magh invasion was supported by the Governor himself. Abdul Wahid was later given the title of Sarhad Khan.

Khamaung returned to Bhalwa in 1615, to which Sarhad Khan retreated with his family across the Dakatia River. This invasion was eventually dealt with by his son, Mirza Nuruddin and others, allowing Sarhad Khan to return to Bhalwa in January 1616. The Maghs, however, did not fully retreat, and Sarhad Khan had to besiege them for them to flee back to Arakan. After discussing with his son, Sarhad Khan sent one of his men to Khamaung, informing him that the conquest of Bhulua had nothing to do with Arakan yet they have faced four raids from the latter, all of which were unsuccessful. In response, Khamaung was humbled and began referring to Sarhad Khan as father. He then voluntarily gifted a large number of elephants to Sarhad Khan.

=== Later expeditions ===
Sarhad Khan joined Abdun Nabi in the expedition against the Maghs at Katghar near Sitakunda. Unhappy working under the latter, Sarhad Khan and Shaykh Kamal decided to take a shortcut, reaching Katghar in only a matter of days. They then hastily attacked the fort and a battle emerged between the two sides leading to many deaths on both. The Mughal victory was close, but Sarhad Khan and the Mansabdars decided to rest for the night, and thus retreated. The next morning, Magh commander Kuramgiri ordered 10,000 Maghs to block the food supply path, thus starving the Mughal army and leading to an unsuccessful conquest.

The governor of Bengal Ibrahim Khan Fath-i-Jang visited Sarhad Khan at his house where he gifted him with a gold-embroidered white shawl and a horse on behalf of Emperor Jahangir. He then appointed Sarhad Khan to be the chief commander to suppress the uprising in Koch Hajo, alongside Shaykh Kamal as the general. Mirza Baqi and Raja Raghunath were later sent to the Ghalwapara fort near Khanpur river with a fleet of 100 war-boats to safely escort the leftover troops of Sarhad Khan and Shaykh Kamal. The army successfully defeated Bhabachan Singh.

== See also ==
- History of Noakhali
- Mrauk invasion of Bhulua
