= Baharistan-i-Ghaibi =

17th century Mughal history

The Baharistan-i-Ghaibi (Persian: بهارستان غیبی), written by Mirza Nathan in Persian, is a 17th-century chronicle on the history of Bengal, Cooch Behar, Assam and Bihar under the reign of Mughal emperor Jahangir (1605–1627). Unlike other history books of the Mughal Empire, written by court historians by order of the emperor and covering the history of the whole empire, the Baharistan-i-Ghaibi deals only with the affairs of Bengal and the adjoining area.

== Author ==
The Baharistan-i-Ghaibi was written by Alauddin Isfahani, alias Mirza Nathan. His father, Ibrahim Kalal, later entitled Ihtimam Khan was a special officer of Jahangir. On his orders, Ibrahim Kalal went to Bengal in 1608, along with Islam Khan Chishti, as an admiral of the Mughal fleet. Mirza Nathan accompanied his father in his service. Later Mirza Nathan was awarded the title of Shitab Khan by Jahangir. Serving in the Mughal army in Bengal, he witnessed most of the region's political events and common life, and wrote from personal observation. He took part in battles against Khwaja Usman and Pratapaditya during the viceroyalty of Islam Khan, but during the later period he was engaged in the warfare in Kamrup.

When the prince Shah Jahan revolted against his father Jahangir and came to Bengal, Mirza Nathan joined him and helped in his war operations, but when the prince left Bengal for the Deccan, Mirza Nathan went into hiding and was not heard of anymore. Believed to be living a retired life, he adopted the pseudonym of Ghaibi (Invisible). Mirza Nathan's eyewitness accounts have provided detailed and lucid accounts of the Mughal conquest of Kamarupa, Kachhar and Assam. The accounts of the several Magh invasions of the Mughal territory of Bhulua and the several Mughal invasions to Chittagong are found in greater details in the Baharistan; the Arakanese and the Portuguese sources give only a short account.

== Organisation ==
The Baharistan-i-Ghaibi was lost for a long time until its discovery by Sir Jadunath Sarkar in the national library in Paris, France. Sir Jadunath wrote several articles in English and Bengali journals, bringing the manuscript to scholarly attention. The University of Dhaka procured a photograph copy of the book and M. I. Borah, the then professor of Persian, translated it into English. The government of Assam published it in 1936; the book consists of two large volumes of about a thousand printed pages. The English translation of Borah is very scholarly with copious notes of technical terms and geographical places. The book is divided into sub-sections called daftars. The first daftar is the Islamnama account of the generalship of Islam Khan, while the second daftari documents the generalship of Qasim Khan Chisti; the Ibrahimnama documents the generalship of Ibrahim Khan Fath-i-Jang, and the last daftar deals with the rebellion of Shahjahan that usurped control of the Bengal region, and is called the Waqiat-i-Jahanshahi. Mirza Nathan gives only four complete dates in the whole book, three of which are negated by his own narrative. However, references to the Muslim months of Ramadan, Eid, Muharram and other festivals help ascertain the chronology of events accurately. Scholars have ascertained that the first two daftars were completed before 1632 and the last two were completed before 1641.

== Accounts ==
The Baharistan-i-Ghaibi is a unique and extensively documented source of the history of contemporary Bengal, Bihar and Assam and the Mughal subjugation of the region. The only other source of the time Tuzk-e-Jahangiri, the official memoirs of the emperor only briefly mention a few events in Bengal. Mirza Nathan's account follows the campaigns of Islam Khan, as well as the conflicts with of Koch Hajo, Tippera, Kachar, Ahoms and Mrauk U (over Chittagong) in lucid and copious details, including full accounts of the battles, the political situation and socio-economic life and conditions of the region during Jahangir's time. The book names and describes the regional political and military leaders and warriors who played instrumental roles in the events of the era.

== See also ==
- History of Bangladesh
- Islam in Bangladesh
- Khalekdad Chowdhury
