= Mahafata Khan =

Mughal Faujdar of Sylhet Sarkar from 1668 to 1670

Faujdar of Sylhet Sarkar
- In office 1668-1670
- Monarch: Aurangzeb
- Governor: Shaista Khan
- Preceded by: Jan Muhammad Khan
- Succeeded by: Farhad Khan

Mahāfatā Khān Bahādur (Bengali: মহাফতা খান বাহাদুর, romanized: Mohafota Khan Bahadur, Persian: مهافتیٰ خان بهادر), was a Faujdar of the Mughal Bengal's Sylhet Sarkar. He governed Sylhet under the Subahdar of Bengal, Shaista Khan and Mughal emperor Aurangzeb. He was the successor of the previous faujdar, Jan Muhammad Khan. In 1670, Mahafata granted Raghunath Bisharad, of Ita Pargana, 3.5 hals of land. This was the same person who had also been gifted land from a previous faujdar of Sylhet by the name of Lutfullah Khan Shirazi. In the same year, Mahafata was succeeded by Faujdar Farhad Khan.

== See also ==
- History of Sylhet
- Isfandiyar Beg

Political offices
Preceded by Jan Muhammad Khan	Faujdar of Sylhet; 1668-1670	Succeeded by Farhad Khan
