= Muqabil Khan =

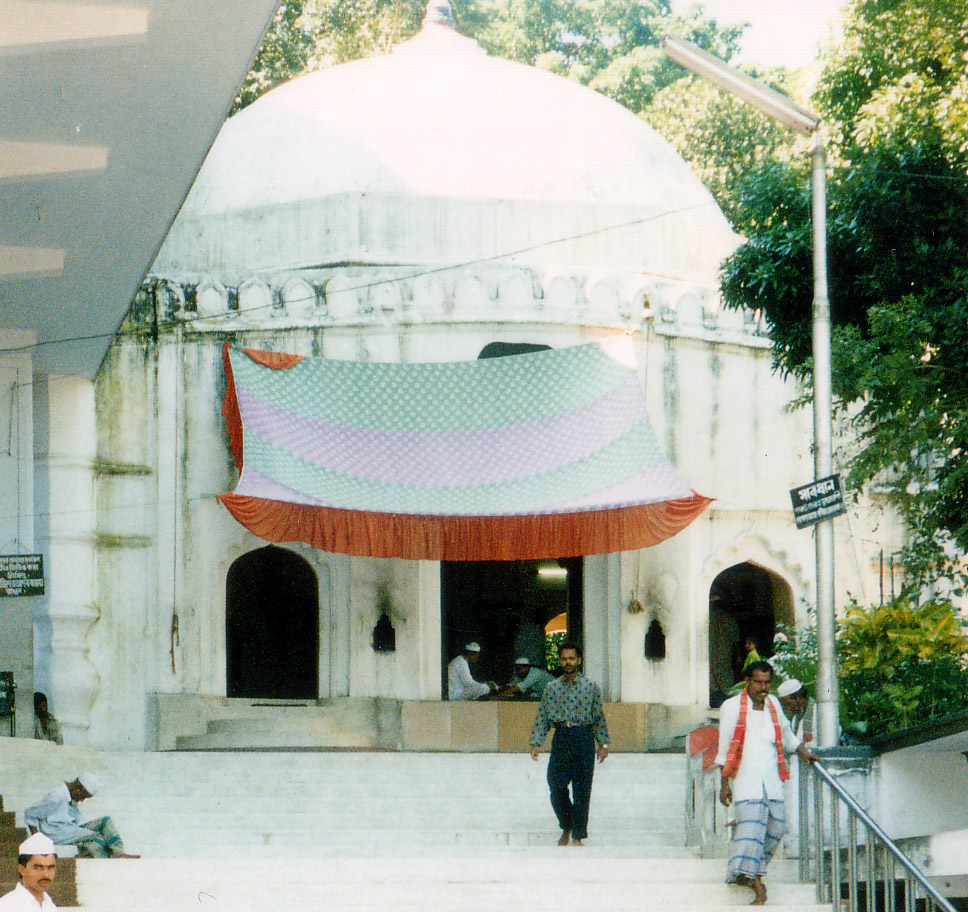
- The tomb of Shah Jalal. Muqabil Khan was buried in close proximity to this revered fourteenth-century saint.

Wazir of Srihat
- In office 1440
- Monarch: Mahmud Shah I
- Preceded by: Unknown
- Succeeded by: Khurshid Khan

Personal details
- Died: 15th century Sylhet
- Resting place: Dargah of Shah Jalal, Sylhet

Muqabil Khan (Bengali: মুকাবিল খান, Persian: مقابل خان), also known as Maqbul Khan (Bengali: মকবুল খান, Persian: مقبول خان), was a wazir and sar-e-lashkar of Srihat (Sylhet) in 1440. He was the wazir of Sylhet in 1440 during the reign of Sultan Nasiruddin Mahmud Shah of the restored Ilyas Shahi dynasty. It is unknown when Khan's office started and how long he was wazir for. After his death, he was buried in the dargah of Shah Jalal, to the west of Jalal's tomb. There is a gap between Haydar Ghazi, wazir of Sylhet in the mid-fourteenth century, and Khan as the governors of Sylhet during that time is unknown. The next known successor of Muqabil Khan was Khurshid Khan who governed Sylhet in the 1460s.

== See also ==
- Farhad Khan
- History of Sylhet
- Lutfullah Shirazi

Preceded by Unknown	Wazir of Srihat; 1440	Succeeded by Khurshid Khan
