= Khurshid Khan =

Officer of Bengal Sultanate

Majlis al-Muʿazzam wal-Mukarram Khurshid Khan

1463

Minister of Srihat
- Monarch: Barbak Shah I
- Preceded by: Muqabil Khan
- Succeeded by: Majlis Alam

Personal details
- Died: 1503

Khurshid Khan (Bengali: খুরশিদ খান, Persian: خرشيد خان), was an officer of the Bengal Sultanate, stationed across various locations such as Bihar, Sylhet, Dhaka, North Bengal and Chittagong.

== Background ==
According to the Muzaffar Shah's Nawabganj inscription, Khurshid's name was also Ulugh. This suggests he is of Turkic origin.

== Life ==
Khan was known to have established many mosques throughout Eastern India. In Bihar, he constructed a mosque in Bhagalpur on 3 August 1446 under the reign of Nasiruddin Mahmud Shah.

The Hathkhola inscription, dated 19 October 1463, mentions Khurshid Khan. The tughra inscription, which was discovered by a farmer in nearby Anair Haor, refers to the builder as "the Great Khan, Khurshid Khan, chief of the royal palace guards" (Arabic: خان معظم خرشيد خان محليان نوبت عالي, romanized: Khān Muʿazzam Khurshīd Khān Maḥaliyān Nawbat ʿĀlī). This is the earliest extant Muslim stone tablet in the Sylhet region.

On 31 May 1465, he built someone's tomb in Dhaka and referred to himself in the inscription as Majlis Khurshīd Nawbat Ghayr Maḥaliyān (مجلس خرشيد نوبت خير محليان).

It is said that he is the person who, during the reign of Habshi Sultan Shamsuddin Muzaffar Shah, built a mosque near Nawabganj on the banks of the Mahananda River. This took place on 30 December 1492 and the inscription mentions him as Majlis al-Muʿazzam wal-Mukarram Majlis Ulugh Khurshīd (مجلس المعظم والمكرم مجلس ألغ خرشيد).

During the reign of Alauddin Husayn Shah, he also constructed a mosque in Diwan Hat, Chittagong. The inscription was recently discovered in the mosque's gateway and contained tughra calligraphy.

== Death ==
During the reign of Alauddin Husayn Shah, Muqarrab Khan ibn Chand Malik constructed a jama masjid in Murshidabad in 1503. At the end of the inscription, the writer prays and wishes well for Majlis Khurshid's akhirah suggesting that Khurshid died around this time.

== See also ==
- Haydar Ghazi
- History of Sylhet
- Lutfullah Shirazi

Political offices
Preceded by Muqabil Khan	Minister of Srihat; 1463	Succeeded by Majlis Alam
