= Sadiq Khan (disambiguation) =

Sadiq Khan (born 1970) is the mayor of London.

Sadiq Khan or similar names may refer to:

- Sadeq Khan (fl. 1670), Mughal faujdar
- Sadeq Khan Zand (died 1781), Persian Shah
- Sadek Khan (1933–2016), Bangladeshi writer
- Ghulam Sadiq Khan (1939–2016), Indian classical music singer
- Janette Sadik-Khan (born 1961), commissioner of the New York City Department of Transportation from 2007 to 2013

== See also ==
- Siddiq Khan (disambiguation)
