= Mughal conquest of Chittagong =

1665–1666 Mughal military campaign

Conquest of Chittagong
- Part of Mughal conquest of Bengal & Mughal–Mrauk U Wars
Date	November 1665 – 27 January 1666
Location	Chittagong, Mrauk U Kingdom (present-day Chittagong, Bangladesh)
Action	Naval operation Coastal siege
Result	Mughal victory
Territorial changes	Annexation of Chittagong into Dominion of Mughal Empire.

Belligerents
Mughal India; (Bengal Sultanate) Bengal Subah; (Portuguese Empire) Kingdom of Portugal	Kingdom of Mrauk U

Commanders and leaders
Shaista Khan; Farhad Khan; Nawab Wali Beg Khan; Mazlis Khan; Buzurg Umed Khan; Ibn Hussain; Abul Hasan	Sanda Thudhamma; Dilawar

Strength
9,600 troops 300 warships Portuguese: 40 warships	Estimate: 1,100+ troops 217 warships 378+ small boats

Casualties and losses
Light	135 ships captured

Mughal conquest of Chittagong refers to the conquest of Chittagong in 1666. On 27 January 1666 AD, the forces of the Arakan Kingdom of Mrauk U were defeated by the Mughal forces under the command of Buzurg Umed Khan, the son of Mughal Subedar Shaista Khan.

The conquest ended centuries of fragmented authority under the Arakanese Kingdom and various local powers. By incorporating Chittagong into the Mughal Empire, the Mughals established a centralized governance system across the region. This administrative restructuring standardized revenue collection, fortified local defenses, and reduced the frequent conflicts and piracy that had long destabilized the area. Most importantly, it permanently abolished the slave trade. The new administrative order not only consolidated Mughal power but also laid the groundwork for regional integration that would shape governance from the British colonial period to modern Bangladesh.

== Background ==
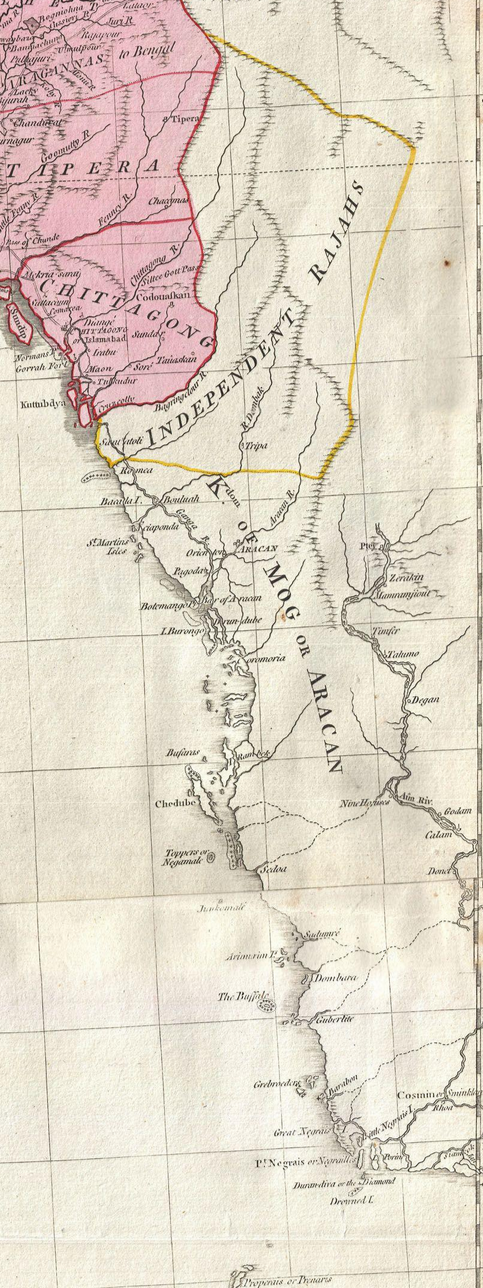
The Kingdom of Mrauk U is labeled "K. OF MOG OR ARACAN."

=== Portuguese role ===
The Kingdom had a fluctuating type of relationship with the Portuguese during the late 16th and early 17th centuries. The Arakanese navy, which heavily relied on Portuguese mercenaries, controlled a significant stretch of the Bay of Bengal coastline. Tensions escalated in 1603 when Portuguese mercenary commander De Brito revolted,

The governor of Chittagong, after falling out with his brother, the King of Arakan, fled to Sundiva and was welcomed by Sebastião Gonçalves Tibau, a Portuguese adventurer who had survived the Arakanese attack on Dianga, entered the service of the Raja of Bakla, who married his sister. However, the governor soon died, reportedly poisoned, and Gonzales seized all of his wealth. Despite that, Gonzales entered into an alliance with the King of Arakan, who sought his assistance against the Mughal forces. The King's army achieved initial success, but at sea, Gonzales had only considered his own interests. He called the Arakanese captains under a council and murdered them, capturing their ships to adding them to his own fleet. The King of Arakan retaliated by executing Gonzales's nephew, who had been given to him as a hostage. In response, Gonzales entered the Arakan River with a fleet, ravaging villages along its banks and capturing several European merchant ships, likely Dutch, that had been trading in the area. By 1610, Tibao further betrayed Razagyi by seizing the Arakanese fleet and continuing his raids, intensifying the conflict.

The Portuguese helped Arakanese or Mogs in various anarchy situations. The Mogs also had business relations with the Dutch, which was known as the Dutch East India Company (VOC). Historians have described the atrocities of the Portuguese and the Mogs as "Both the Mogs of Arakanese and the Portuguese pirates constantly plundered Bengal (Dhaka to Chittagong region). They pierced the palms of the hands of all the Hindus and Muslims they could capture, inserted thin cane ribbons through the holes, and tied them up. Hung together below the ship's deck. Every morning they threw some uncooked rice to the prisoners from above, as food is thrown to birds. They were sold to Dutch, English and French merchants in the Deccan ports. Sometimes they brought their captives to Tamluk and Balasore to sell them at high prices. Only the Portuguese sold their captives, but the Mogs employed the captives in Arakan in agriculture and other occupations or as domestic servants and concubines".

Poet Alaol describes the Arakan (Kingdom of Mrauk U) king's power-symbol fleet in his epic Sikandarnama (published in full in 1673):

অসংখ্যাত নৌকাপাঁতি নানা জাতি নানা ভাতি

সুচিত্র বিচিত্র বাহএ।

জরশি-পাট-নেত লাঠিত চামর যূত

সমুদ্র পূর্ণিত নৌকামএ।

=== Mughal involvement ===
In 1604, Man Singh I, who served as Subahdar of Bengal from 1602 to 1604, established a Mughal coastal navy with assistance from Portuguese pirates, successfully containing the Arakanese amphibious invasion.

Between 1614-1616, Mughal Subahdar of Bengal Qasim Khan Chishti faced a combined attack of Arakanese and Portuguese forces. Because of a rift between these forces, Qasim Khan managed to thwart the expedition. In February 1616, Qasim Khan built up an army and sent an expedition to take Chittagong back from Arakan. However, dissent amongst the ranks stemming from a personal officer of the subhadar being the commander of mostly imperial forces. The Arakanese recovered the strength with reinforcements who defend the city and cut off food supply lines, failing Qasim Khan's effort to subdur Chittagong.

In 1620, the Maghs of Arakan attacked the Bengali capital of Jahangirnagar (Dhaka). In response, Ibrahim Khan Fath-i-Jang defeated them and captured 400 Magh war boats. This part of Dhaka continues to be known as Maghbazar. During his term, he also freed the Baro-Bhuiyan chief Musa Khan and his allies. It is said that Ibrahim Khan appointed Dilal Khan as Dhaka's naval commander.

In 1657, Aurangzeb defeated his other brothers in a fratricidal war between the four sons of Shah Jahan for the Mughal throne. One of the rival brothers of Aurangzeb was Shah Shuja, a Subahdar of Bengal for about 20 years from 1640 to 1660. After the defeat in the fratricidal war, Shah Shuja hoped to sail from Noakhali to Mecca or Istanbul by sea. However, as the rainy season came, it did not happen any more. Meanwhile, Emperor Aurangzeb's forces are constantly looking for Shah Shuja. To escape from Aurangzeb, Shah Shuja sought political asylum in the neighboring state of Arakan with a large amount of treasures (approx 23 tons). In August 1660, the once Bengal Subahdar Shah Shuja settled in Arakan State. But after six months, Shah Shuja was killed by the Arakan King. The daughters of Shah Shuja's family were abused, and the sons were imprisoned. This sad news of the Mughal Prince soon reached the Emperor of Delhi, who was the prince's brother, the Mughal emperor Aurangzeb. The emperor sent two emissaries in succession to the Arakan royal court asking for the return of his brother Shah Shuja's children and treasures. The Arakanese captured and enslaved the first messenger. The second emissary was received by the royal court of Arakan, but all the children had already been killed, and their wealth confiscated, so there was no reply. Under the pretext to avenge the murder of his brother, Shah Shuja, at the hands of the Arakanese King, the Mughal Emperor during that time, Aurangzeb decided to invade Chittagong.

== Campaign ==
In 1664, the Arakanese ships raided Jahangirnagar, they attacked Dhaka, the capital of Bengal, with the help of the Portuguese pirates and destroyed about 160 Mughal imperial ships, which further the Mughals' resolve to put an end to the Arakanese piracy. Aurangzeb appointed Shaista Khan as subahdar (governor) of Bengal. Fearing an inevitable conflict with the Mughals the Arakanese started preparing for war. At the behest of the Mughal Emperor, Shaista Khan embarked on a war plan, rebuilding the destroyed ships.

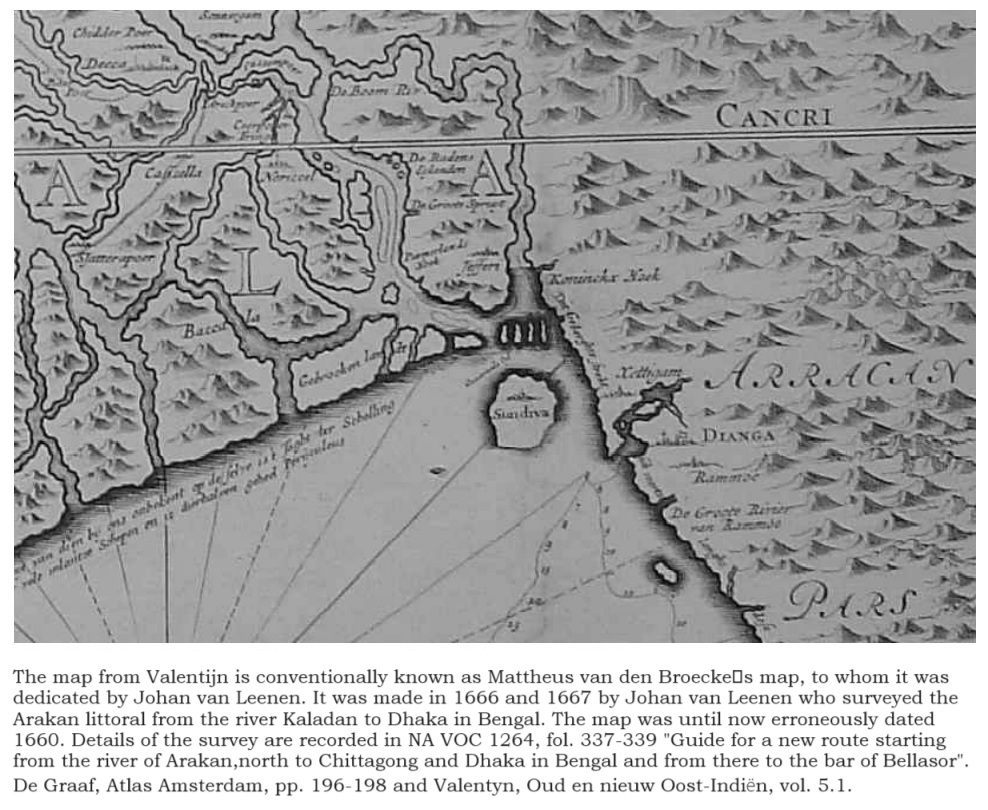
Map of Chittagong area in 1660

In the winter of 1665, Shaista Khan formed a well-equipped army to fight against the Arakanese. His son, Buzurg Umed Khan joined this mission of Chittagong recovery as the chief commander. According to the court history of the Mughals, the son of the former Mrauk U King Thiri Thudhamma is believed to have accompanied the Mughal force, intended to be placed as king after conquering Arakan.

=== Sandwip pacification ===
In November 1665, Shaista Khan, the Mughal governor of Bengal, appointed General Abul Hasan to lead the conquest of Sandwip Island with the support of the Dutch military. They faced the army of Dilawar, 80 years old pirate ruler of Sandwip. Abul Hassan attacked Sandwip and fought with Dilawar, who after being hit by an arrow fled to the jungles. Meanwhile, the Arakanese fleet came up to Sandip to render assistance to Dilawar. Abul Hassan prepared to assault the Arakanese fleet, which withdrew, and Abul Hasan, not pursuing it, retired to Noakhali. Nawab Shaista Khan, on hearing of this, sent another fleet consisting of 1,500 gunners and 400 cavalry, commanded by Ibn-i-Husain, Superintendent of the Nawarah (Fleet), Jamal Khan, Serandaz Khan, Qaramal Khan, and Muhammad Beg to reinforce Abul Hassan; to co-operate with the latter and occupy Sandwip; and to extirpate Dilawar. Ibn-i-Husain with this reinforcement moved up to Noakhali, in front of Sandwip, and halted there with Muhammad Beg in order to blockade the passage of the Arakanese fleet. Abul Hassan, with others, then attacked Sandwip, wounded and captured Sharif, son of Dilawar, and also captured, after severe fighting, Dilawar and his followers, and sent them as prisoners to Jahangirnagar. Dilawar had many sons and two daughters; Musabibi and Maryam Bibi. Among his sons, only the name of Sharif Khan is known. As a means of compensation, Shaista Khan granted Dilawar's younger sons a jagir of 10-12 villages on the banks of the Dhaleshwari River in Patharghata-Mithapukur near Dhaka. These villages were destroyed due to fluvial erosion two hundred years later. The family then relocated to the village of Ganda in Savar.

=== Chittagong coast pacification ===
Later, after the Mughals captured Sandwip with the assurance of Dutch diplomatic support and military aid, The naval battle took on another dimension when 40 ships under the command of Portuguese Captain Moore, experienced in Bengal's waterways, joined the Mughal fleet. Meanwhile, 6500 Mughal army led by Buzurg Umed Khan started advancing towards Chittagong across Feni River. Before the Mughal conquest, Chittagong was called a forest of hills and trees. Historians wrote analogies that the forest was so dense that ants had no way to move. A large number of axes were supplied from Dhaka for the Mughal army, with which they cleared the forest and arrived at the outskirts of Chittagong. Historians call this road built by the Mughals the origin of the present Dhaka-Chittagong Trunk Road. On January 27, 1666, Chittagong's fort Anderkilla, the Arakanese centre of the region, fell after a three-day siege in a two-pronged attack. But due to insufficient logistics and the monsoon, they limited their progress to the banks of the Naf river.

== Aftermath ==
The second stone block inscribed in Persian.

The Chittagong Hill Tracts frontier region was made a tributary state of Mughal Bengal and a treaty was signed with the Chakma Circle in 1713. The conquest ended centuries of fragmented authority under the Arakanese Kingdom and various local powers. By incorporating Chittagong into the Mughal Empire, the Mughals established a centralized governance system across the region. This administrative restructuring standardized revenue collection, fortified local defenses, and reduced the frequent conflicts and piracy that had long destabilized the area.

The Mughals and the Portuguese held sway in the following naval battle. The conquered territory to the western bank of Kashyapnadi (Kaladan river) was placed under direct imperial administration. The name of Chittagong was changed to Islamabad, and it became the headquarters of a Mughal faujdar. Bujurg Umid Khan renamed Chittagong as Islamabad after capturing Anderkilla and built a mosque on top of the fort the following year, which is now known as Anderkilla Jame Masjid. Above the entrance of the mosque, there are two stone blocks inscribed in Persian. The second one translates as 'O Wise! You tell the people of the world that the second Kaaba has been established in this world today. The date of its establishment is 1078 Hijri.' Khan also re-asserted Mughal control over Cooch Behar and Kamarupa.

The Arakanese tried hard to recapture this region of Bengal, but they were not successful. Later, the Mughals built buildings, mosques, and temples in Chittagong. After the Mughals took Chittagong, the Portuguese moved to the Ferengi Bazaar in Dhaka. Descendants of the Portuguese still reside in these places.

== See also ==
- Chittagong
- Mrauk U invasion of Bhulua
- Anderkilla Shahi Jame Mosque

== Bibliography ==
- Bhattacharya, Sabyasachi (2020). A Comprehensive History of Modern Bengal, 1700-1950. Asiatic Society. ISBN 978-93-89901-95-5.
- Kerr, Robert (1812). A General History of Voyages and Travels to the End of the 18th Century. Vol. 6. Robert Kerr.
- Stuart, John (1909). Burma through the centuries. London : K. Paul, Trench, Trübner & co., limited.
- Samiul Hasan, ed. (2012). The Muslim world in the 21st century : space, power, and human development. New York: Springer. ISBN 978-9400726321.
