= Sadeq Khan =

Sadeq Khan সাদেক খাঁ

Faujdar of Sylhet Sarkar
- In office 1678–1679, 1688–1689
- Monarch: Aurangzeb
- Governor: Ibrahim Khan II
- Preceded by: Farhad Khan
- Succeeded by: Inayetullah Khan

Sadeq Khān (Bengali: সাদেক খাঁ), also known as Mohammad Sadeq Khan (Bengali: মোহাম্মদ সাদেক খাঁ, Persian: صادق خان), was a Faujdar of the Mughal Bengal's Sylhet Sarkar. He succeeded Farhad Khan as faujdar in 1688.

== Life ==
In 1678, Farhad Khan took a one year break from being the faujdar of Sylhet as he was appointed the task of being the faujdar of Chittagong. During this time, Sadeq may have been the regent faujdar. It is said that Sadeq was ordered by Farhad to have built a mosque (which now remains incomplete) west of the former Sylhet Police lines.

In 1688, Sadeq also granted land to his citizens. He gave land to Kashmishwar Chakrabarti, father of Ramchandra Chakrabarti, in Longla Pargana. Faujdar Enayatullah Khan was the next known faujdar after Sadeq.

An inscription on a certain mazar (mausoleum) in the dargah of Shah Jalal was found to have been built in 1689. Syed Murtaza Ali is of the opinion that this is possibly the grave of Sadeq.

== See also ==
- History of Sylhet
- Lutfullah Shirazi

Political offices
Preceded by Farhad Khan	Faujdar of Sylhet; 1688-1689	Succeeded by Inayetullah Khan
