= Buzurg Umed Khan =

Mughal officer (d. 1694)

Buzurg Umed Khan বুজুর্গ উমেদ খাঁ

Faujdar of Allahabad
- In office –1694

Zamindar of Buzurg Umedpur

Faujdar of Islamabad (Chittagong)
- In office 1666–1678
- Monarch: Aurangzeb
- Governor: Shaista Khan
- Preceded by: Post established
- Succeeded by: Farhad Khan

Personal details
- Died: 1694 Allahabad, Mughal Empire
- Relations: Pari Bibi (sister); Mumtaz Mahal (aunt)
- Parent: Shaista Khan (father)

Buzurg Umed Khan (বুজুর্গ উমেদ খাঁ) (died 1694) was the youngest son of Mughal governor Shaista Khan and the first Faujdar of Chittagong (IsIamabad). He led the main army during the Mughal reconquest of Chittagong against the Maghs and Portuguese pirates in 1666. The Buzurg-Umedpur Pargana of Backergunge District was named after him.

== Early life and family ==
Khan was of Persian origin. His great-grandfather Mirza Ghiyas Beg and grandfather Abu'l-Hasan Asaf Khan were the viziers of the Mughal emperors Jahangir and Shah Jahan, respectively, while his great-great-grandfather Khvajeh Mohammad-Sharif was vizier of several Safavid provinces. He also had familial connections with the imperial Mughal dynasty, having been a paternal grandnephew of the empress Nur Jahan and the nephew of the empress Mumtaz Mahal. His father, Shaista Khan, was the Mughal governor of Bengal.

== Reconquest of Chittagong ==
After the defeat in the Mughal war of succession, Prince Shah Shuja, who was expelled from Arakan, was supposed to leave for Mecca or Istanbul by sea, but in the end, due to a disagreement with the King of Mrauk U Sanda Thudhamma, Shah Shuja was brutally murdered after six months. This news soon reached the Mughal emperor Aurangzeb in Delhi. On the one hand, Shaista Khan was appointed as the Governor of Bengal Subah to avenge the attacks, looting and fratricide of the Magh pirates in Bengal for half a century. Emperor Aurangzeb's first order to him was to stop the Magh pirates from the coast of Bengal and to recover Chittagong from the Arakanese. Buzurg Umed Khan participated in the war against Sulaiman Shikoh, son of Dara Shikoh, and he along with his father, were loyal to Aurangzeb. Aurangzeb awarded Buzurg Umed with the title of Khan in the first year of his reign. Later, he also participated in the war against Dara Shikoh and Shah Shuja with Aurangzeb's army.

To recapture Chittagong, Shaista Khan formed a well-equipped army. Shaista Khan's worthy son, Buzurg Umed Khan, was appointed as the chief commander against the Maghs of Arakan as a mansabdar of 1000. The Mughal army led by Buzurg Umed Khan departed from Jahangir Nagar. Another person named Husayn Beg was appointed as the commander of the navy. In January 1666, Buzurg Umed Khan crossed the Feni River towards Chittagong, cutting down vast forests and making roads, and gradually advanced. On the other hand, Husayn Beg, who was leading the navy, occupied the strategic battle site of Sandwip and set off towards the city of Chittagong. A fierce battle took place between the Mughal navy and the Arakan-backed Magh pirates on the Kumira coast of Chittagong. In the battle, the Mughal navy was largely defeated. At that time, the land force led by Buzurg Umed Khan reached the Kumira coast and fired cannons at the Magh pirate ships. Unable to withstand the heavy blows from the Mughal land and navy, the Magh pirates were finally forced to flee towards Arakan with their warships.

After this, the two armies, land and sea, joined forces and attacked the Mughal pirate stronghold of Chittagong Fort (Andarkilla) on January 24, 1666. After three days of bloody fighting, the Mughal army entered Chittagong city.

== Faujdar of Chittagong ==
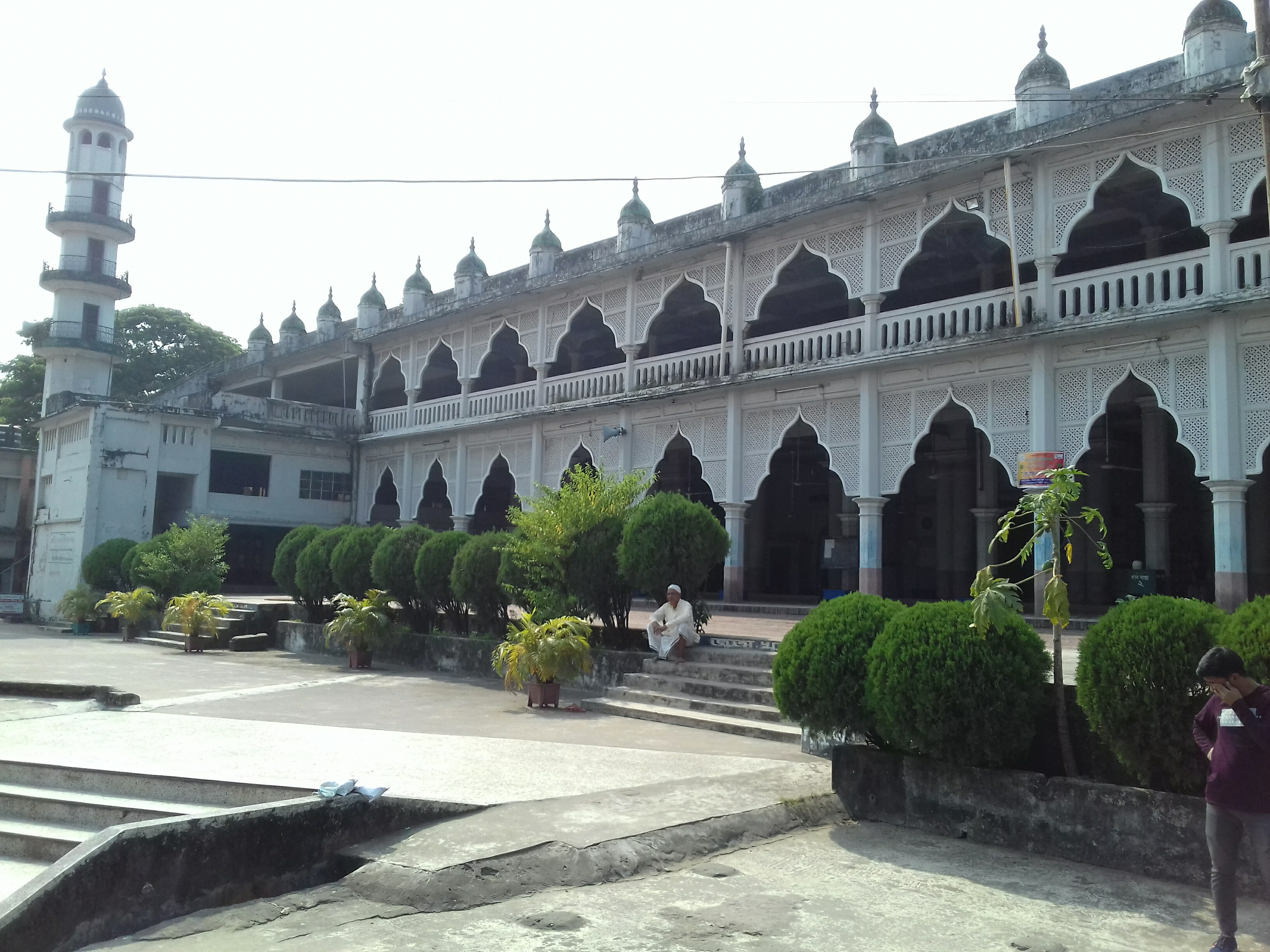
Buzurg Umed Khan is credited with the establishment of the Anderkilla Shahi Jame Mosque in Chittagong.

On 27 January 1666, the Mughal army hoisted the Helali flag on the Andarqilla fort in triumph, and Chittagong was renamed 'Islamabad'. Buzurg Umed Khan was appointed the first Mughal Faujdar of Islamabad. At that time, his mansabdari was increased from 1000 to 1500. After conquering Chittagong, he marched south along with the Mughal army and gradually expelled the Maghs from Chittagong, reaching Ramu. Buzurg Umed Khan fixed the Mughal border up to the Ramu River and returned before the monsoon arrived.

== Zamindar of Buzurg-Umedpur ==
Aurangzeb was very happy with the news of winning the war with the Maghs and capturing Sandwip and Chittagong. Happy, he gave a Pargana within Chandradwip to Buzurg Umed Khan. That pargana was named Buzurg Umedpur. Areas like Baqarganj, Patuakhali, Betagi, Mirzaganj etc. were included in the Buzurg Umedpur pargana. The village where Buzurg Umed Khan lived in Bakerganj was used to store the army's ammunition, so the name of the village came to be Golabari. When some complaints were heard about Buzurg Umed Khan, his father took him back to Jahangir Nagar.

== Subahdar of Allahabad and Bihar ==
After his duties in Chittagong, Buzurg Umed Khan also served as the Subahdar of Allahabad and Bihar for a long time. He died in Allahabad in 1694. A large pargana in the Bakerganj (Barisal) region was named after him, Buzurg Umedpur.

== See also ==
- Mirza Agha Baqer, zamindar of Buzurg-Umedpur
