= Anderkilla Shahi Jame Mosque =

Mosque in Chittagong, Bangladesh

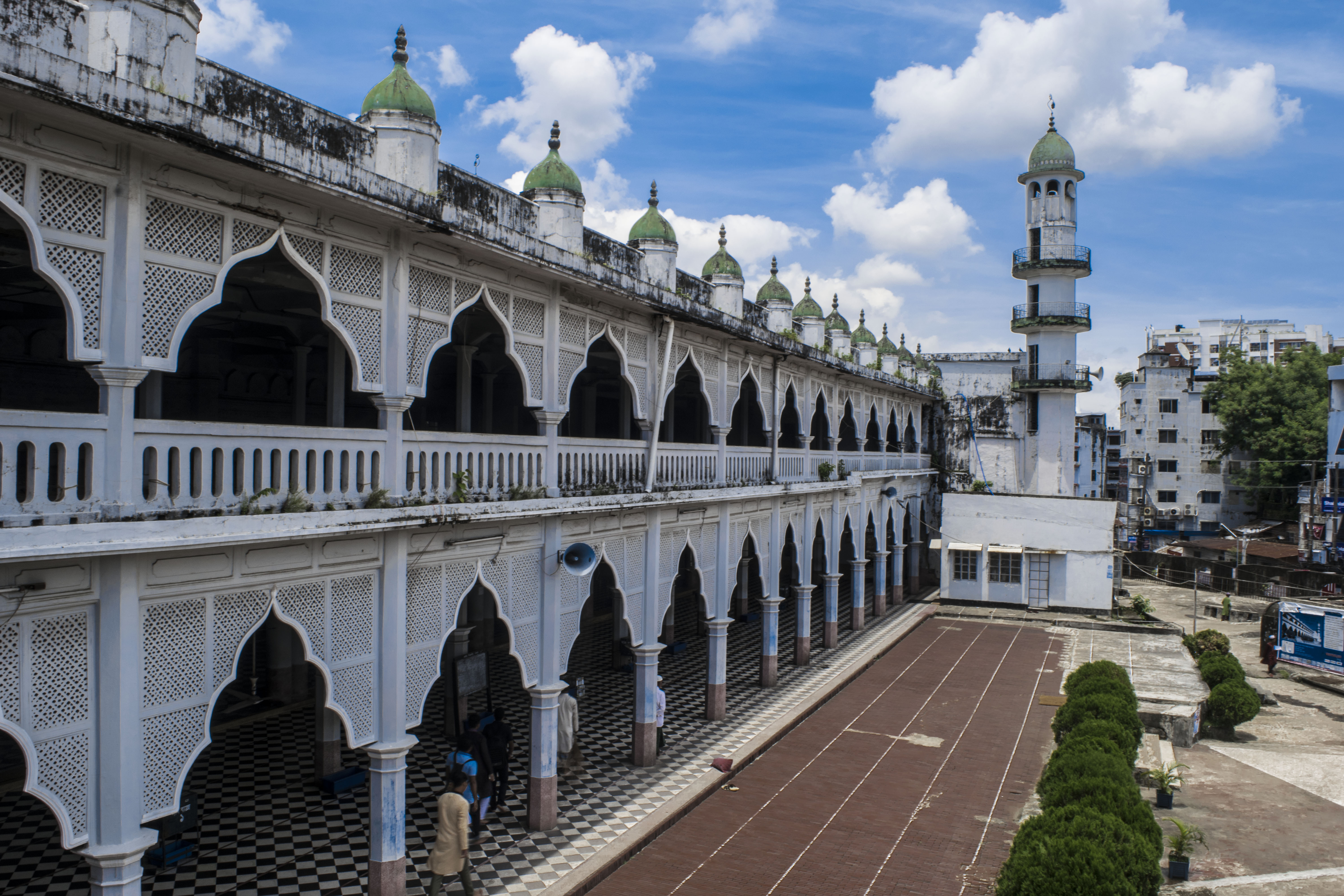

- Location of the mosque in Bangladesh

Religion
- Affiliation: Sunni Islam
- Ecclesiastical or organisational status: Mosque
- Status: Active

Location
- Location: Chittagong
- Country: Bangladesh
- Coordinates: 22°20′28″N 91°50′12″E

Architecture
- Type: Mosque architecture
- Style: Indo-Islamic; Mughal
- Established: 1667; 359 years ago

Specifications
- Length: 17.07 m (56.0 ft)
- Width: 7.32 m (24.0 ft)
- Minaret: Three
- Minaret height: 41 m (135 ft)
- Materials: Marble

The Anderkilla Shahi Jame Mosque (Bengali: আন্দরকিল্লা শাহী জামে মসজিদ; Arabic: جامع أندرقلعة الشاهي) is a Sunni mosque, located in the city of Chittagong, Bangladesh. Built on top of a high hill called Ander-Qila (meaning inner fort), the mosque stands as a monument of the Mughal conquest of Chittagong.

== History ==
The Persian inscriptions adorning the mosque attest that its construction was undertaken in 1667 CE, during the governorship of Shaista Khan, the Subahdar of Bengal. Contemporary accounts and later traditions hold that the mosque was commissioned under the direction of Buzurg Umed Khan, who was the eldest son of Shaista Khan and led the Mughal conquest of Chittagong. However, the inscriptions themselves make no explicit mention of his name.

The mosque was unused for a long time and in the year 1761, the British officials used it to store arms and ammunition. In 1853, the Muslim elites of Chittagong, headed by Hamidullah, approached the British Government and were successful in releasing the mosque for religious purposes in 1855.

== Current condition ==
In 2025, the Government of Bangladesh decided to initiate the renovation and reconstruction of this 450-year-old mosque.

== See also ==
- Islam in Bangladesh
- List of mosques in Bangladesh
