= Siddiq Khan =

Siddiq Khan can refer to:

- Siddiq Khan (umpire) (1947–2007), Pakistani cricket umpire
- Siddiq Khan Kanju (died 2001), Pakistani politician and Minister of State for Foreign Affairs
- Siddiq Hasan Khan (1832–1890), Indian Islamic scholar
- Muhammad Siddiq Khan (1910-1978), Bangladeshi academic and librarian

== See also ==
- Sadiq Khan (disambiguation)
