= Farhad Khan =

Mughal military strategist

Nizam-e-Zamanah Farhad Khan

Thanadar of Bhalwa (Noakhali)
- In office 1665-1670
- Monarch: Aurangzeb
- Governor: Shah Shuja

Faujdar of Sylhet
- In office 1670-1678, 1679-1688
- Governor: Shaista Khan
- Preceded by: Mahafata Khan
- Succeeded by: Sadeq Khan

Faujdar of Islamabad (Chittagong)
- In office 1678-1679
- Governor: Muhammad Azam Shah
- Preceded by: Buzurg Umed Khan
- Succeeded by: Jafar Khan

Farhād Khān (Persian: فرهاد خان, Bengali: ফরহাদ খাঁ), also known as Nizam-e-Zamanah (Bengali: নিজাম-ই-জমানা) or Nizam-e-Zaman (Persian: نظام زمان), was a Mughal military strategist who had many positions throughout his life. He was the most well-known Faujdar of Sylhet Sarkar, governing in the late 17th century during the reign of Mughal emperor Aurangzeb. He was renowned for the construction of numerous bridges and places of worship in the region.

== Career ==
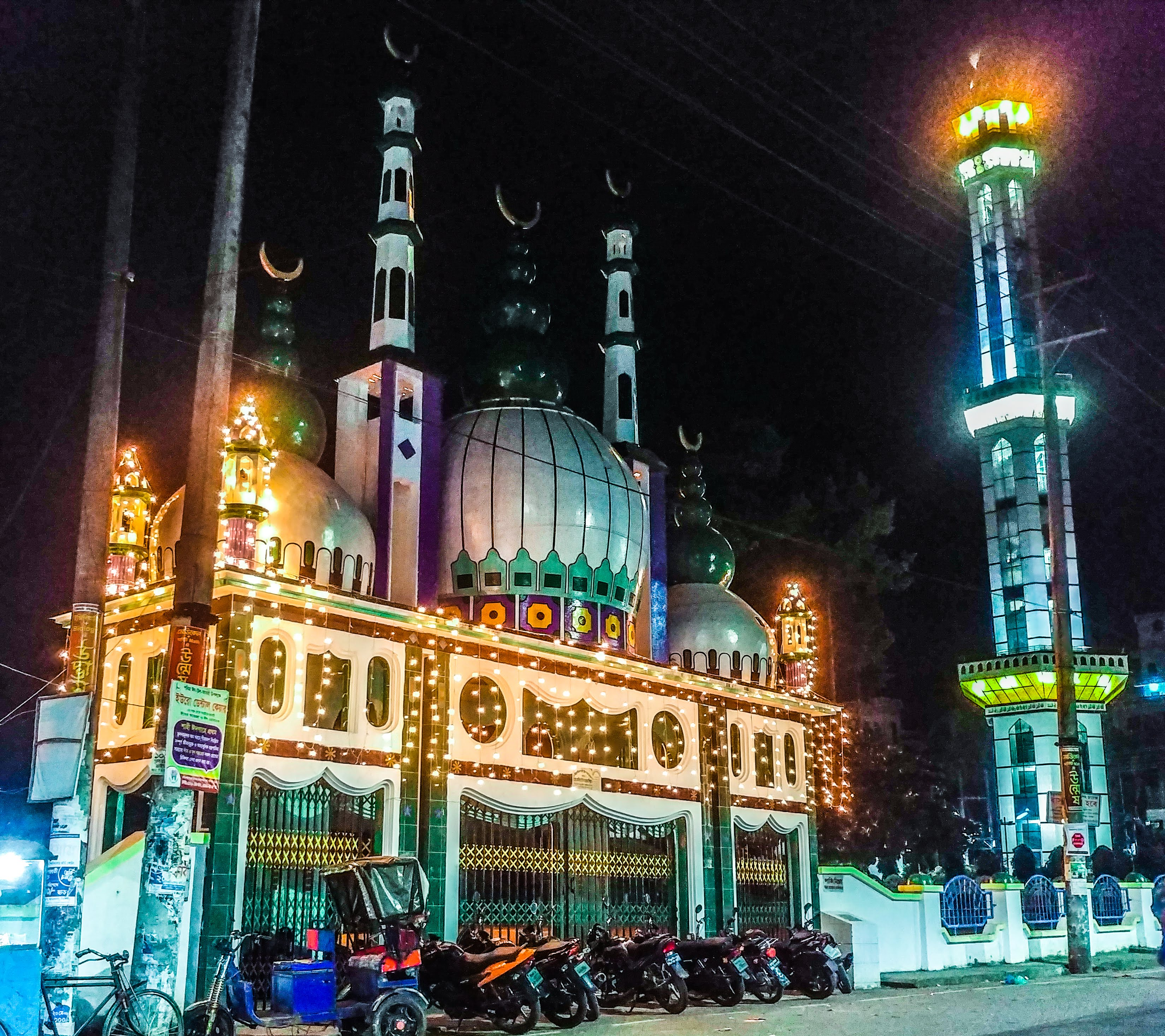
Khan's Sylhet Shahi Eidgah, would later become the battlefield of the 1782 Muharram Rebellion.

Farhad was the thanadar of Bhalwa (Noakhali). In the 1665 Conquest of Chittagong, the Firingis led by Captain Moor set fire to Arakanese fleets and fled to Bhalwa (Noakhali) where Farhad gave them refuge. Farhad later sent them off to the Subahdar of Bengal Shaista Khan in Jahangirnagar. In response, the Subahdar launched a December expedition led by his son Buzurg Umed Khan and ordered Farhad to join the fleet of Ibn Husayn and Zamindar Munawwar Khan. Shaista Khan also ordered Mir Murtaza, the superintendent of artillery, to join and protect Farhad. On 2 January, the fleet split ways with Farhad and Murtaza going through land with the other leaders going through the river. Following the successful conquest, Farhad was awarded with a rank as a mansabdar of Hazar-o-Pansadi (1500 soldiers under his command) and 350 horses.

In 1670, Farhad became the faujdar of Sylhet succeeding Mahafata Khan. In the same year, he granted 27.25 hals of land to Syed Muhammad Najat Khan of Sylhet, whose heir was Ahsanullah, in the parganas of Kauria and Atuajan.

Farhad built the Shah Jalal Dargah complex in 1678. He is presumed to have constructed a small three-domed mosque, replaced in the late 1700s. Farhad appointed a descendant of Shams ad-Din Kamali as the imam of the mosque, who would later become a mufti and found the Mufti Family of Sylhet. Farhad was also responsible for the construction of the single-domed Bara Gumbad hall in the same complex. It has octagonal towers on its four corners and arched openings. The eastern facade of the mosque has a large central arched entrance and two smaller arched entrances, one on either side of the main entrance. The inscription is on the top of the main flat-arched entrance.

In 1678, Khan gifted 5.75 haals of land to Ratneshwar Chakraborty in Longla Pargana. He also granted land to Ramapati Chakrabarti, father of Srikrishna Chakrabarty of Ita, in Alinagar Pargana as well as giving land in Bejura Pargana to Ramkanta Chakrabarti of Qasimnagar, whose heir was Balaram Bisharad. In 1684, Khan built another mosque in Raihusayn Mahalla (Rainagar). The ruins of another mosque established by Khan can also be seen south-west of Dargah Mahalla (west of the former Sylhet Police lines during the British rule). In 1688, he built the Gualichorra Bridge.

Farhad Khan left Sylhet for a short while in 1678. He served as the 5th faujdar of Chittagong (then known as Islamabad) with Husayn Quli Khan as his Dewan and Mir Jafar as his Bakshi. Ghatforhadbeg (Ghat Farhad Beg), a ghat which used to be on the Karnaphuli is named after him. He returned to Sylhet in 1689.

Khan established the Sylhet Shahi Eidgah, the largest eidgah of its kind in the region. The bridge located in Mirabazar-Shibganj road is still known as Farhad Khaner Pul (Farhad Khan's bridge) today.

== Deputies ==
Farhad Khan had a number of naib-faujdars who would also, like Khan, grant land to residents in Sylhet. They held the title of Nawab. Nawab Syed Muhammad Ali Khan Qaimjung, Naib in 1680, granted land to zamindars such as Jamabakhsh Faqir of Chowallish in 1680, Ramshankar Bhattacharya of Shamshernagar, Kalikanta Chakrabarty of Panchakhanda, Gangadhar Sharma of Baniachong and Ramchandra Chakrabarti of Pathariya. Nawab Nasrullah Khan, Naib in 1683, granted land to Pandit Ramgovinda Bhattacharjee in Chowallish. In 1685, Nawab Abd ar-Rahman Khan was the Naib-Faujdar.

Political offices
Preceded by	Thanadar of Bhalwa (Noakhali); 1665-1670	Succeeded by
Preceded by Mahafata Khan	Faujdar of Sylhet; 1670-1678, 1679-1688	Succeeded by Sadeq Khan
Preceded by Buzurg Umed Khan	Faujdar of Islamabad; 1678-1679	Succeeded by Jafar Khan

== See also ==
- History of Noakhali
- History of Sylhet
