= Isfandiyar Khan Beg =

Mughal faujdar of Sylhet Sarkar from 1663 to 1665

Faujdar of Sylhet
- In office 1663–1665
- Monarch: Aurangzeb
- Governor: Mir Jumla II, Shaista Khan
- Preceded by: Lutfullah Shirazi
- Succeeded by: Syed Ibrahim Khan

Personal details
- Parent: Allah Yar Khan (father)

Mirzā Isfandiyār Khān Bēg (Persian: اسفندیار خان بیگ, Bengali: ইসপেন্দিয়ার খান বেগ), was the Mughal faujdar of Sylhet Sarkar from 1663 to 1665.

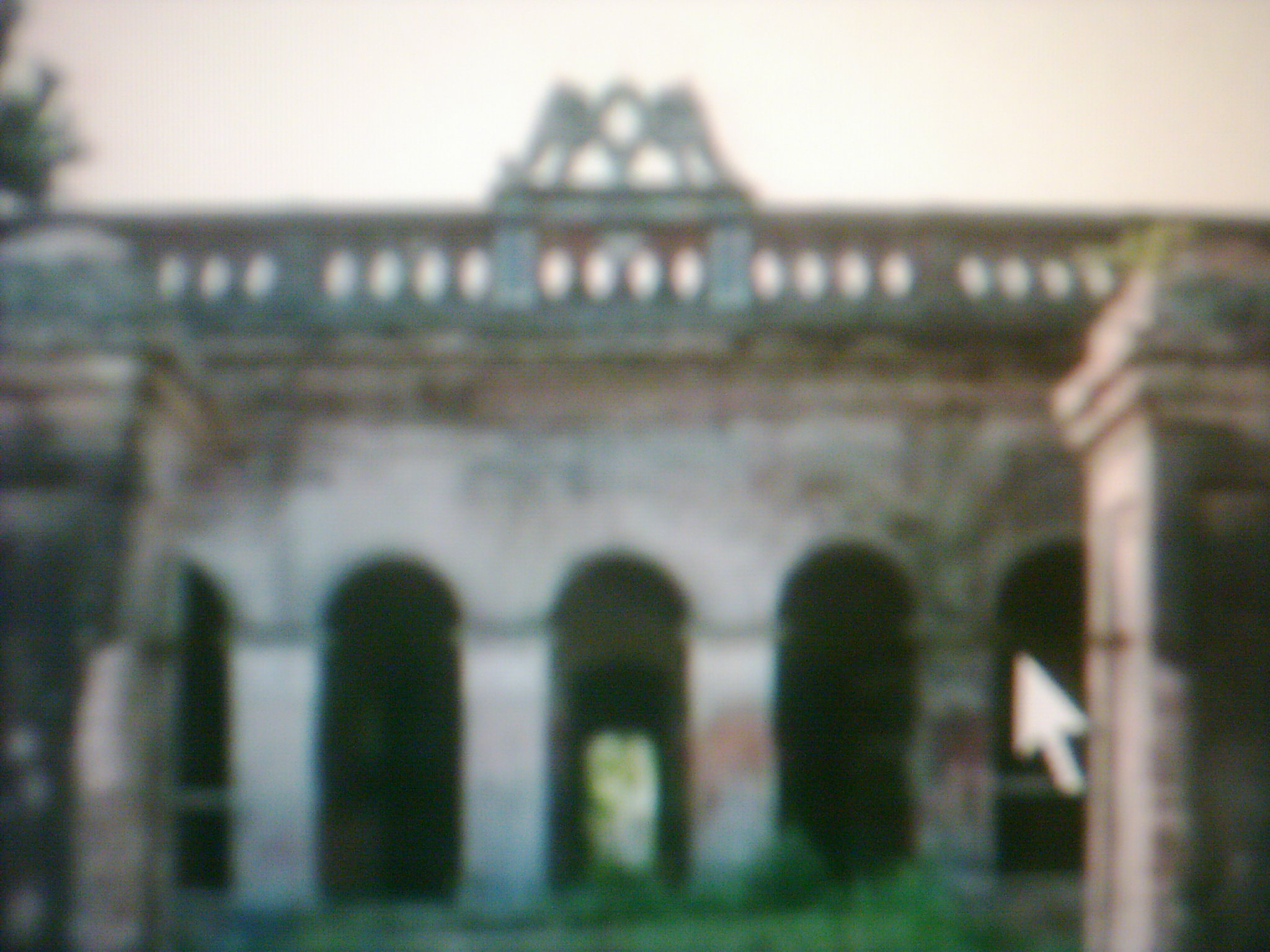
The entrance of Pailgaon Zamindar Bari

== Early life ==
Isfandiyar Beg was from an illustrious family, and some members of his family have been noted by their contemporary, Mirza Nathan in his memoir Baharistan-i-Ghaybi. Isfandiyar's father was Mirza Allah Yar Khan (also spelt Ilahyar, Allahyar or Ilah Yar), who was the oldest son of Iftikhar Khan Turkmen (also known as Iftiyar), both of whom took part in Islam Khan I's battle at Daulambapur, South Sylhet against Khwaja Usman in 1612. Iftiyar died in this battle. Emperor Jahangir granted jagir to Allah Yar Khan, who led the Mughal army against the Portuguese in Siege of Hughly in 1632, and died in 1650. Isfandiyar's uncle, Mirza Makki, who had distinguished himself in imperial service, was given the title of Mu'taqad Khan and appointed Subadar of Orissa by emperor Shah Jahan, where he is said to have ruled justly for a long time. Isfandiyar's youngest uncle, Mirza Rahmanyar, supported Shah Shuja, and was thus killed on the order of Aurangzeb in Dhaka.

Isfandiyar had two known brothers- Mirza Mahyar (died 1649) and Mirza Zulfiqar Khan (died 1652), both of whom were granted fiefs in Bengal.

== Career ==
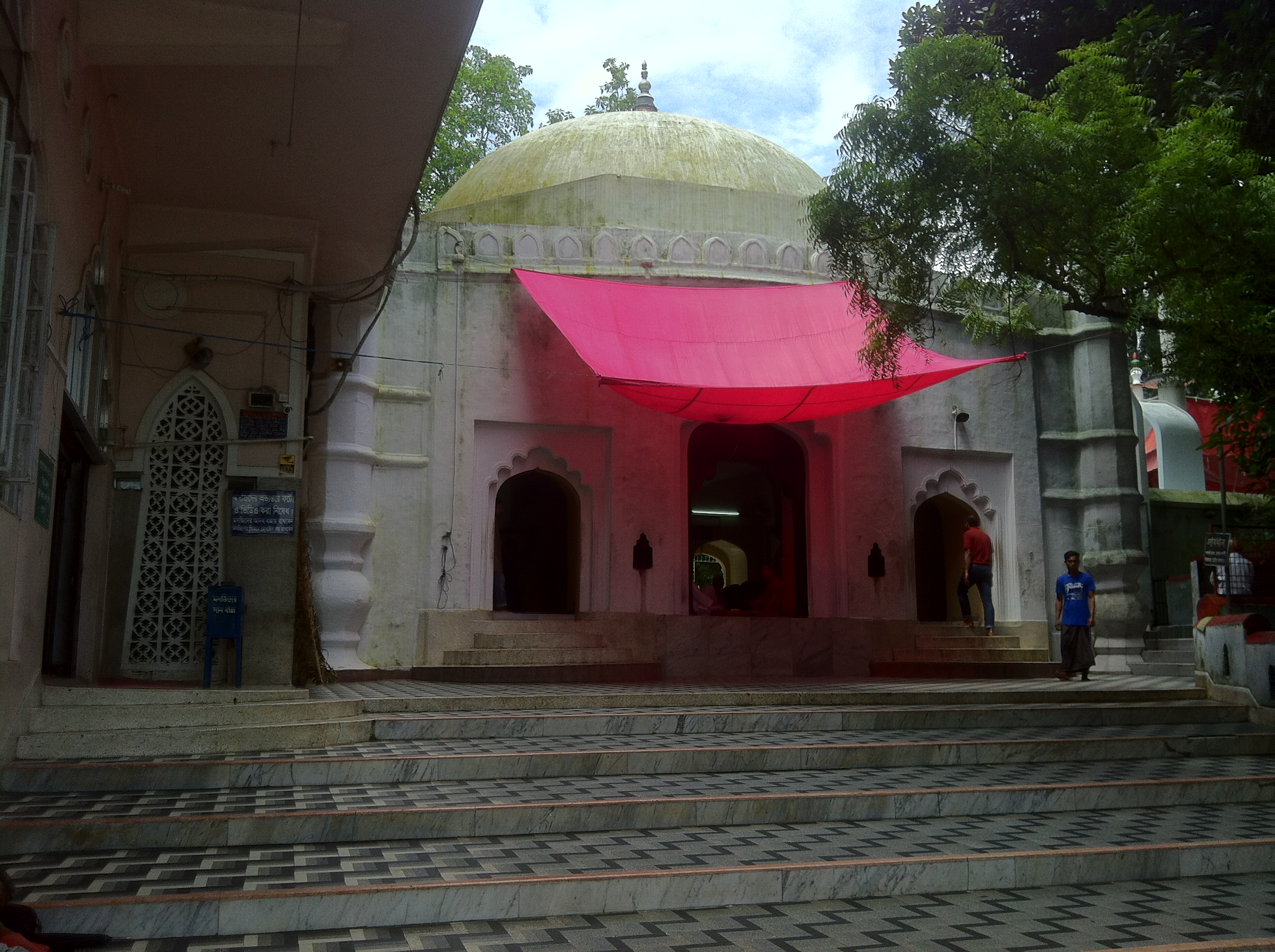
Shah Jalal's mausoleum.

Following Mir Jumla II's conquest of Cooch Behar, Isfandiyar Beg was put in charge of governing the area and defeated the previous ruler, Pran Narayan. According to a sanad from Dhar Chowdhury of Pailgaon, Isfandiyar Beg had revenues in Sylhet in 1658.

Isfandiyar Khan succeeded Lutfullah Shirazi as Faujdar of Sylhet in 1663. Isfandiyar was known to have destroyed the Adina Mosque replica in Sylhet town because the imam started Eid al-Adha prayers without waiting for him. However, after its destruction, Isfandiyar attempted to build another mosque in Dargah Mahalla. The ruins of this mosque can be seen today, behind the trees near the Dargah Gateway. Isfandiyar also officially recognised Shaykh Pir Bakhsh as the rightful khadim (guardian) of Shah Jalal's dargah, a descendant of Haji Muhammad Yusuf who was the dargah's first guardian.

Isfandiyar granted land to Shah Kamal Estate of Durmut in Jamalpur. Khan was succeeded by Syed Ibrahim Khan in 1665.

== See also ==
- History of Sylhet

Political offices
Preceded by	Governor of Cooch Behar; 1658-1663	Succeeded by
Preceded by Lutfullah Shirazi	Faujdar of Sylhet; 1663-1665	Succeeded by Syed Ibrahim Khan
