= Lutfullah Shirazi =

17th century Mughal official

Mir Lutfullah Khan Shirazi

Faujdar of Kamrup/Shujabad
- In office 1656–1658
- Monarch: Shah Jahan
- Governor: Shah Shuja
- Preceded by: Noorullah Khan Herati
- Succeeded by: Unknown

Faujdar of Sylhet
- In office 1658–1663
- Monarch: Aurangzeb
- Governor: Mir Jumla II
- Preceded by: Sultan Nazar
- Succeeded by: Isfandiyar Beg

Personal details
- Children: Motiullah Khan (son)
- Relatives: Sunarful (descendant)

Mīr Lutfullāh Khān Bahādur Shirāzī (Persian: مير لطف الله خان بهادر شيرازي, Bengali: মীর লুৎফুল্লাহ খান বাহাদুর শিরাজী, Meitei: ꯃꯤꯔ ꯂꯨꯠꯐꯨꯜꯂꯥꯍ ꯈꯥꯟ ꯕꯍꯥꯗꯨꯔ ꯁꯤꯔꯥꯖꯤ), was a Mughal official who held a number of positions during his life such as the Faujdar of Shujabad Sarkar from 1656 to 1658 and the faujdar of Sylhet Sarkar up until 1663.

== Background and origin ==
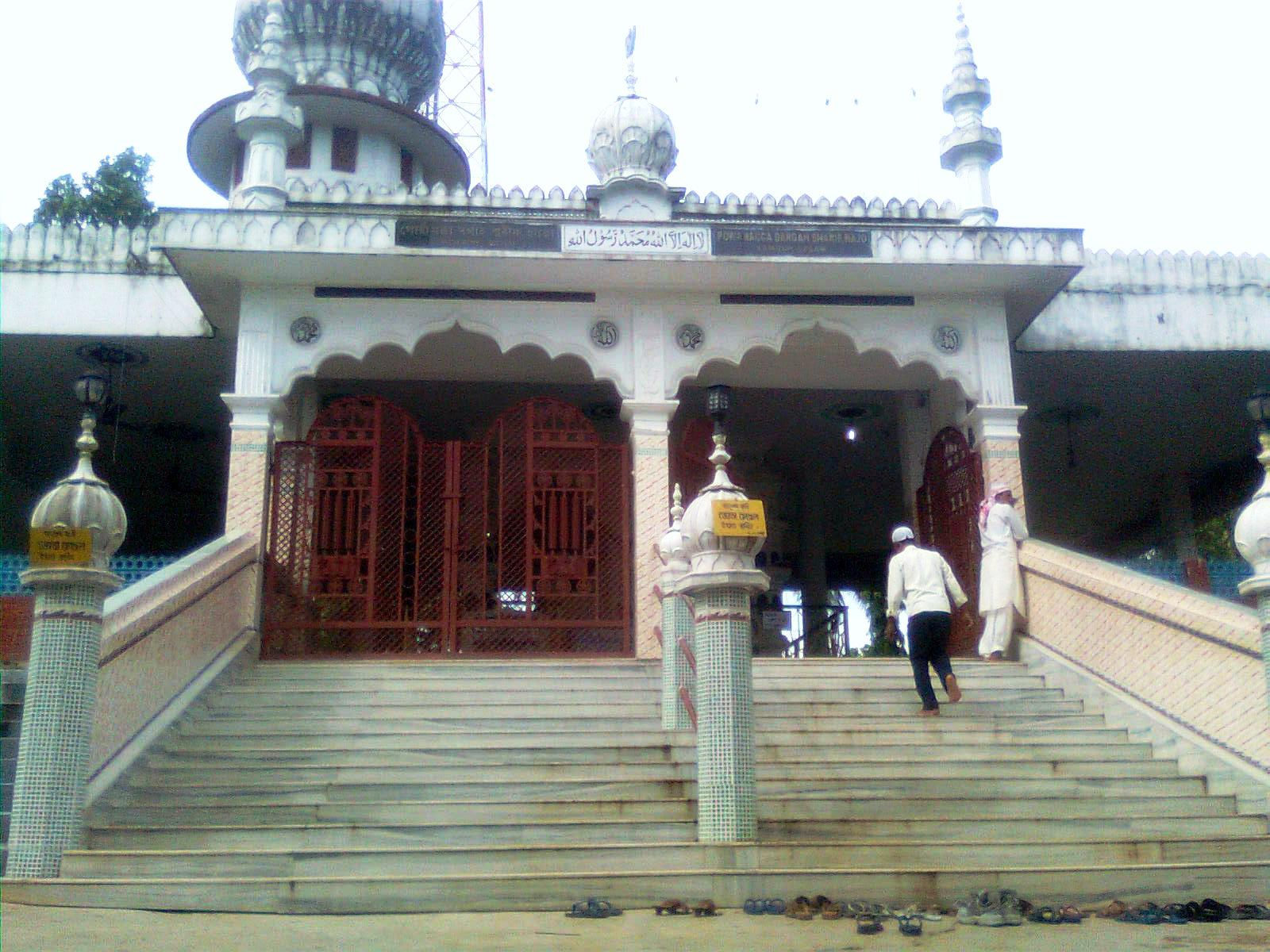
Ahom King Sukhrungphaa is said to have continued to pay great attention to Powa-Makkah Mosque in Hajo even after the Mughal expulsion in 1682.

Shirazi was of Persian descent, originally from the Iranian city of Shiraz.

== Career ==
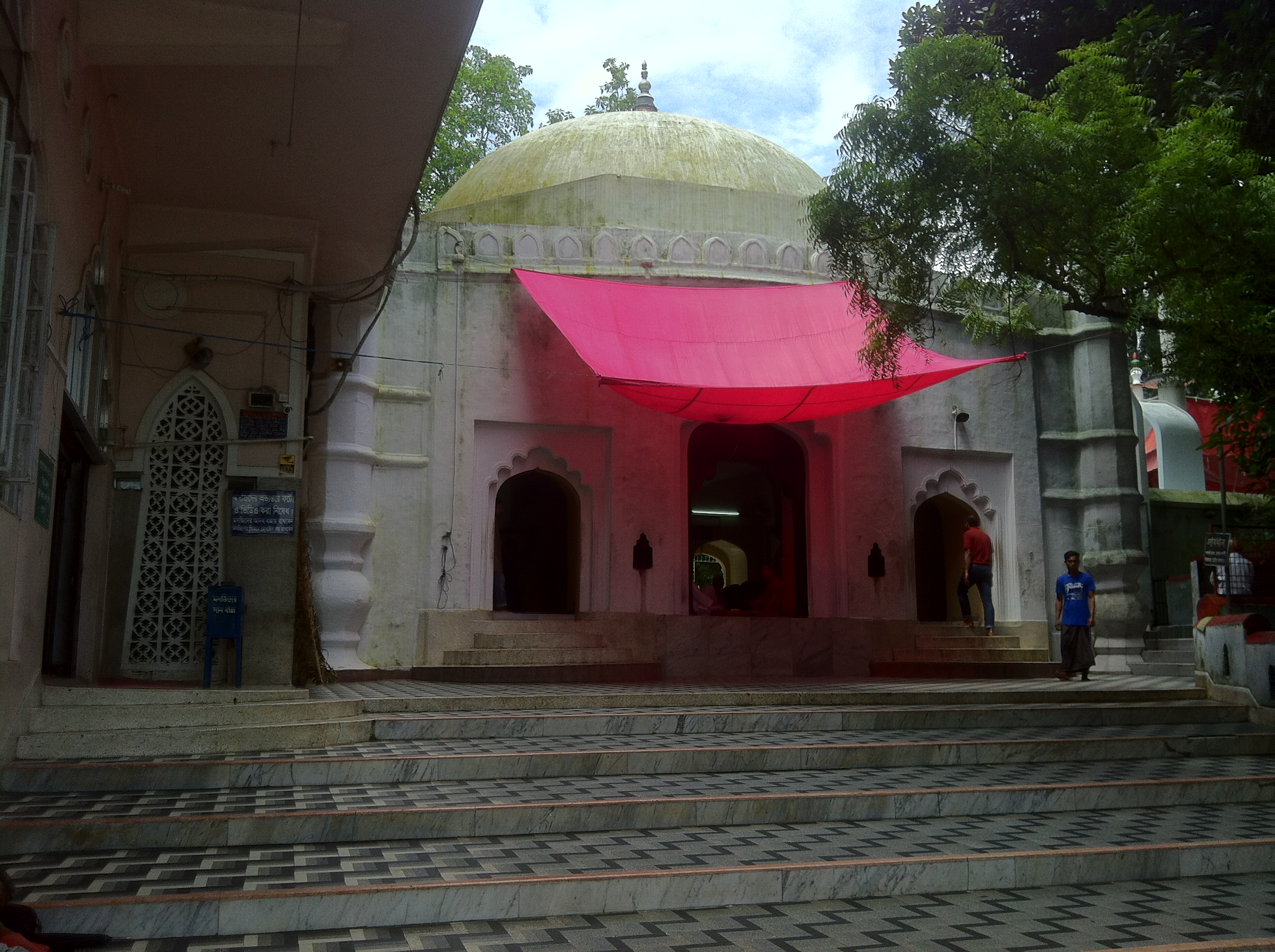
Shah Jalal's mausoleum.

Documents show that Shirazi was a commander for the Subahdar of Bengal, Shah Shuja. He succeeded Noorullah Khan Herati as Faujdar of Shujabad Sarkar (Kamrup region) in 1656. In 1657, Shirazi built the hilltop mosque at Hajo, known as Powa-Makkah Barmaqam. It contained the shrine of Ghiyath ad-Din Awliya, an Iraqi prince and preacher commonly credited for introducing Islam to the region. Shirazi was a disciple of Shah Syed Niamatullah of Karnal and he was visited by the Shah in this mosque according to inscriptions.

As Mir Jumla's invasion of Assam commenced, Shirazi fled from Guwahati to Dhaka in 1658 after the Ahoms and the Koch Biharis rebelled, being led by their rulers Supangmung and Pran Narayan respectively. In Dhaka, he was then appointed the faujdar of Sylhet Sarkar and migrated there, replacing Sultan Nazar. In 1660, he established a strong enclosure in the Shah Jalal Dargah in Sylhet town and also built a small mosque next to it. The Persian inscription stating this is still in existence today.

He granted Pandit Raghunath Bisharad of Shamshernagar three and a half haals of land in Ita Pargana in 1663.

== Legacy ==
Sunarphool was a member of Shirazi's family . During the reign of King Paikhomba (r.1666–1697) of nearby Manipur, a Muslim nobleman called Muhammad Sani presented gold and elephants to the King in return that he allows more Muslims to reside in his kingdom. The king accepted, and Sunarphool moved to Manipur on Muhammad Sani's request where he lived for the rest of his life. The Pangals that belong to the Makak Angouba clan are descendants of Lutfullah Shirazi through Sunarphool.

== See also ==
- History of Sylhet

Political offices
Preceded by Noorullah Khan	Faujdar of Shujabad; 1656-1658	Succeeded by
Preceded by Sultan Nazar	Faujdar of Sylhet; 1658-1663	Succeeded by Isfandiyar Beg
