= Masum Khan =

Zamindar of Bengal

- মাসুম খাঁ
- Born: 1604; Bhati (region)
- Died: unknown Mughal Bengal
- Father: Musa Khan
- Relatives: Isa Khan (grandfather); Syeda Momena Khatun (great grandmother); Ghiyasuddin Mahmud Shah (great-great grandfather)

Masum Khan (Bengali: মাসুম খাঁ; b. 1604) was a zamindar of Bengal. He was the eldest son and successor of Baro-Bhuiyan leader Musa Khan and the grandson of Isa Khan.

== Family ==
His father, Musa Khan, and grandfather, Isa Khan, were both prominent leaders of the Baro-Bhuiyan confederacy. His great-grandfather, Kalidas Gazdani, converted to Islam under the guidance of Ibrahim Danishmand and took the name Sulaiman Khan. Sulaiman married the Sultan's daughter Syeda Momena Khatun, Masum Khan's great-grandmother, and received the Zamindari of Sarail.

== Rule ==
Following the death of his father in April 1623, the Subahdar of Mughal Bengal Ibrahim Khan Fath-i-Jang recognised Masum Khan as the successor of Musa's estate.

Masum Khan served in the Mughal army's 1632 Siege of Hooghly against the Portuguese. He also took part in the Mughal invasion of Assam in 1636.
