= Mahmud Khan of Bengal =

17th-century Bengali nobleman

Mahmud Khan মাহমূদ খাঁ
- Born: Bhati, Baro-Bhuyan Confederacy (now Sarail, Brahmanbaria District, Bangladesh)
- Died: 17th-century Bengal Subah, Mughal Empire (now Kapasia, Gazipur, Bangladesh)
- Father: Isa Khan
- Mother: Syeda Fatima Bibi
- Religion: Sunni Islam

Mahmud Khan (Bengali: মাহমূদ খাঁ) was a 17th-century Bengali nobleman initially associated with the Baro-Bhuiyan confederacy which challenged Mughal invasions in Bengal. He was the son of Isa Khan, the confederacy's first chief.

== Biography ==
Khan was born into an aristocratic Bengali Sunni Muslim zamindar family known as the Dewans of Sarail in the Bhati region of Bengal. The family served as dewans to the former Sultans of Bengal. His father, Isa Khan, was the leader of the Baro-Bhuiyan confederacy which arose as a result of the fall of the Bengal Sultanate and challenged Mughal invasion. His mother, Syeda Fatima Bibi, was the daughter of Ibrahim Danishmand, a Hanafite scholar from Sonargaon.

After his father's death in 1599, Mahmud pledged allegiance to his elder brother Musa Khan and fought alongside him in the Battle of Dakchara where they were defeated by the Mughals and fled. They challenged the Mughals again shortly after from Katrabo (or Katrapur), which was not far from Islam Khan I's capital at Jahangir Nagar. Mahmud Khan and his force were positioned around Demra khal. A force commanded by Shaykh Rukn was sent against Mahmud in Demra where a clash occurred. Despite resisting the Mughals for over a decade, Mahmud eventually surrendered to them after c. 1610 along with many of his family members.

The Mughals approved his surrender and later requested his assistance in the Mughal campaign against Khwaja Usman of Bokainagar. Mahmud Khan accepted the request and took his force to Bokainagar along with Shaykh Kamal. On the way to Hasanpur, there was discontent among some Mughal officers which were reported back to the Mughal Subahdar of Bengal Islam Khan I by Shaykh Kamal, Mirak Jalair and Mahmud Khan. However, Mahmud Khan remained a supporter of the Baro-Bhuiyan confederacy and kept correspondence with Anwar Khan of Baniachong, who advised Mahmud to ambush the Mughals on arrival to Bokainagar and ally with Usman's forces whilst he advances to Jahangir Nagar and frees Musa Khan. Subsequently, Mahmud Khan sent a letter to Khwaja Usman notifying him of Anwar Khan's conspiracy against the Mughals. The conspiracy was later found out, and Subahdar Islam Khan called for the imprisonment of allied zamindars and particularly placed the death penalty on Mahmud Khan and Bahadur Ghazi. On receipt of Islam Khan's letter, Shaykh Kamal discussed with Shaykh Abdul Wahid regarding what do with Mahmud Khan and Bahadur Ghazi, and decided to imprison them and send them to Islam Khan who was in Tok at the time. The plan was successful and Mahmud Khan was imprisoned in Tok under the surveillance of Islam Khan, who allowed him to live.

== See also ==
- History of Bangladesh
