= Musa Khan Mosque =

Mosque in Dhaka, Bangladesh

- মুসা খান মসজিদ
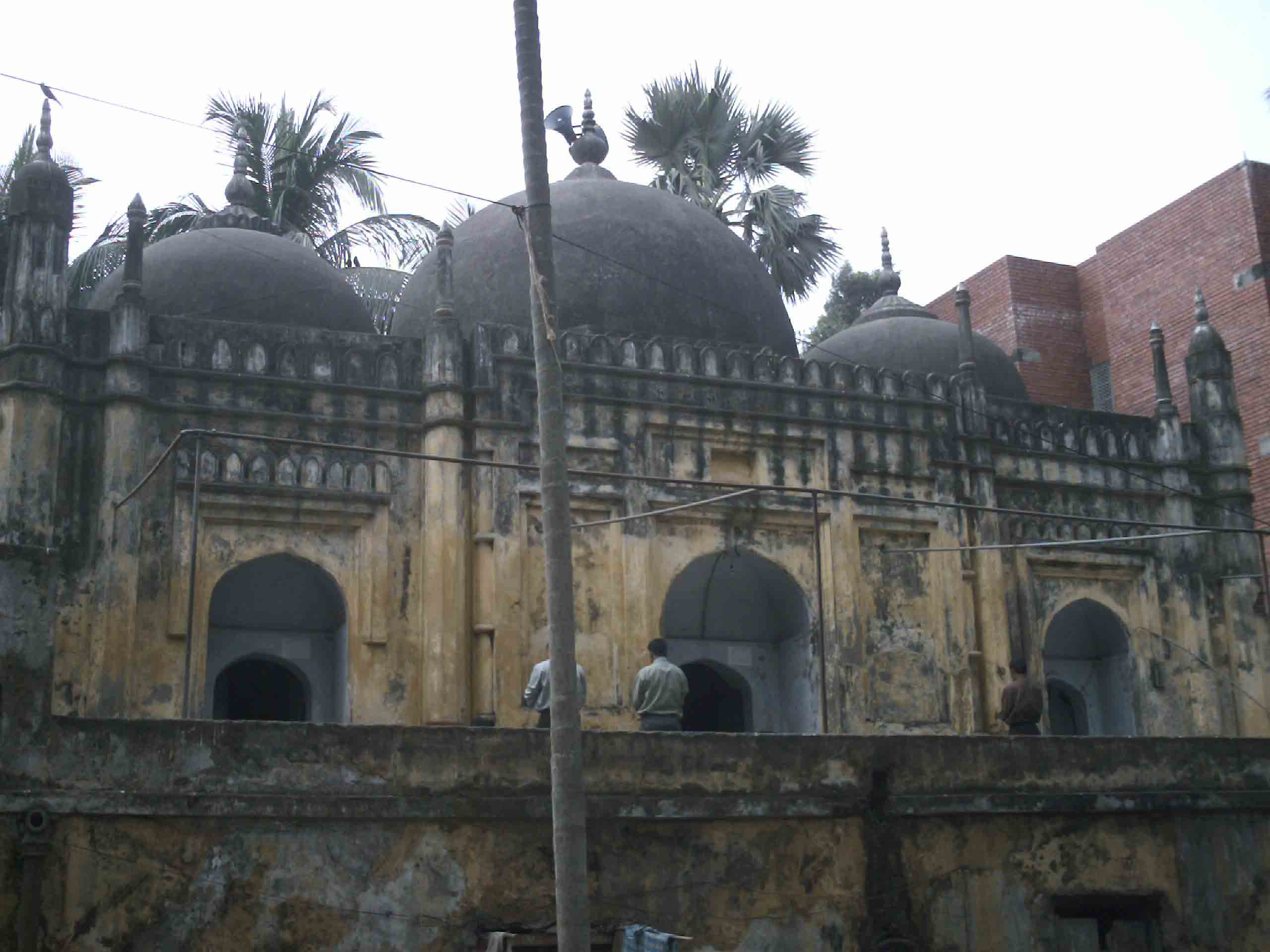

- Location of the mosque in Dhaka

Religion
- Affiliation: Sunni Islam
- Ecclesiastical or organisational status: Mosque
- Status: Active

Location
- Location: University of Dhaka, Dhaka
- Country: Bangladesh
- Coordinates: 23°43′36″N 90°24′03″E

Architecture
- Type: Mosque architecture
- Style: Islamic; Mughal
- Founder: Diwan Munawar Khan
- Established: c. 18th century

Specifications
- Dome: Three
- Minaret: Four

The Musa Khan Mosque is a Sunni mosque, located in the southern part of Dhaka, the capital of Bangladesh. Built during the Mughal era, in the 18th century, the Mughal style mosque holds significant historical value and is named after Musa Khan the son of one of the most prominent Baro-Bhuyans of medieval Bengal, Isa Khan. The mosque was founded by the grandson of Musa Khan, Diwan Munawar Khan.

The three-domed mosque is currently situated in the University of Dhaka campus, beside Shahidullah Hall and behind the Curzon Hall. The mosque is now under significant threat due to a metro-rail project of the government of Bangladesh and is included in the list of 75 structures that may face serious consequences due to the metro-rail.

== Background ==
The land of Bengal in the medieval age used to be ruled by approximately twelve landlords who were popularly known as Baro-Bhuyan in the history. Baro-Bhuyans were led by Isa Khan, a Muslim Rajput commander who conducted a series of successful military campaigns and successfully resisted the Mughal invasion in Bengal till his death. His capital was situated in Sonargaon of Narayanganj District.

After his death in 1599, his son Musa Khan took over the control and continued his father's legacy to fight Mughals in the western and northern fronts but was eventually defeated by Mughal general Islam Khan I, and later became loyal to Mughals and served the Mughal army during the Tripura campaign. Musa Khan died a natural death in 1623 and was buried in Dhaka.

His grandson, Diwan Munawar Khan, in remembrance of his grandfather, built a mosque beside Musa Khan's grave.

== Architecture ==
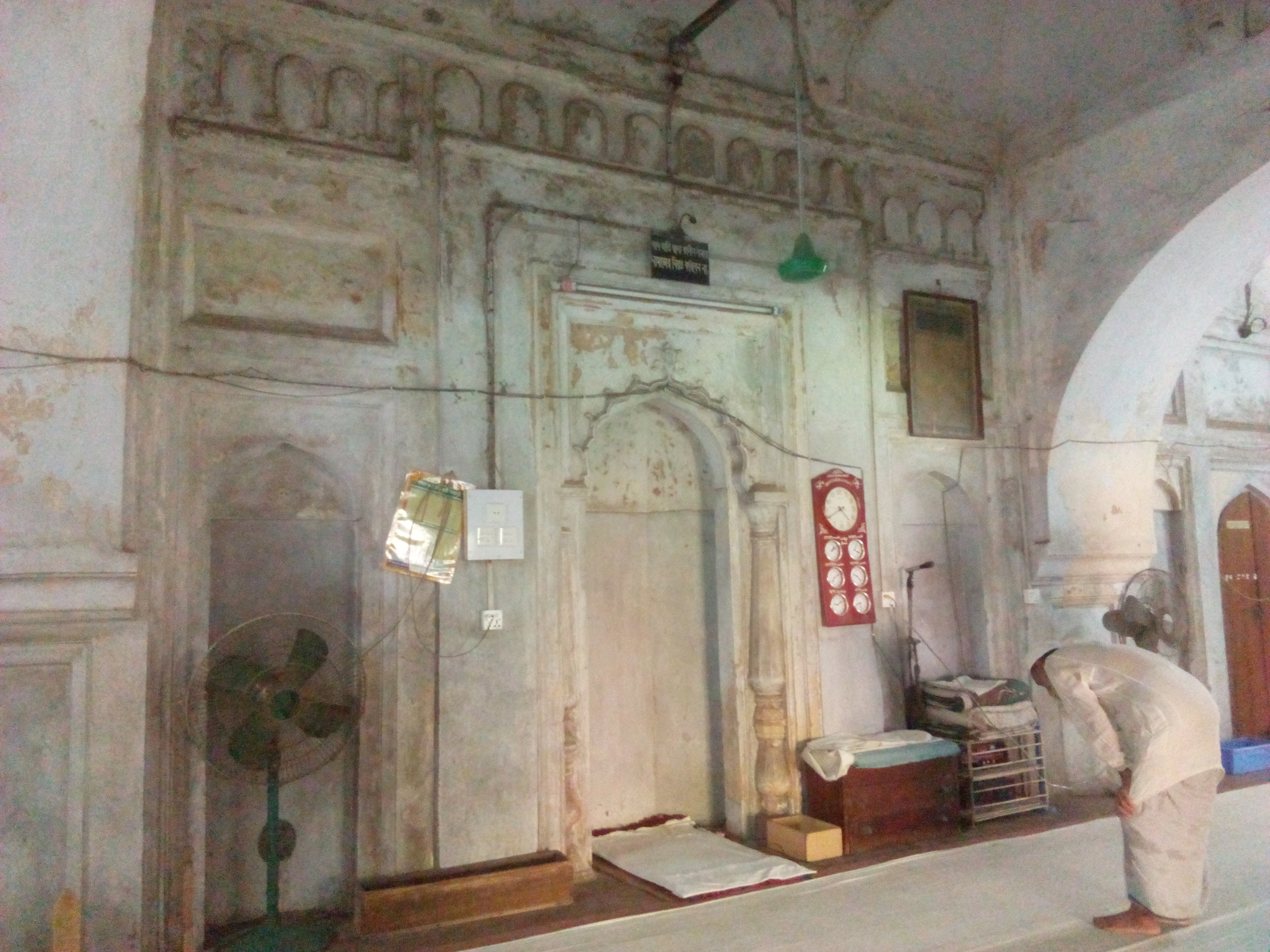
Inside of the mosque

The mosque has three domes and it is built on a vaulted platform of approximately 3 metres (9.8 ft) high. The width of the platform varies from 14 to 17 metres (46 to 56 ft) high. Under the platform there is a series of rooms which are badly damaged.

The top of the stage can be reached by an extended staircase on the southwestern corner. The mosque proper occupies the western half of the platform. The four octagonal corner minarets with extra towers by their sides rise above the flat fortifications and end in compact cabins with domes on the top.

=== Threat ===
The Mughal structure, which is one of the rarest structures in the country, is under threat due to a metro-rail project located adjacent to the mosque. The structure is among 75 structures with historical importance that have fallen under threat due to the project.

== Gallery ==
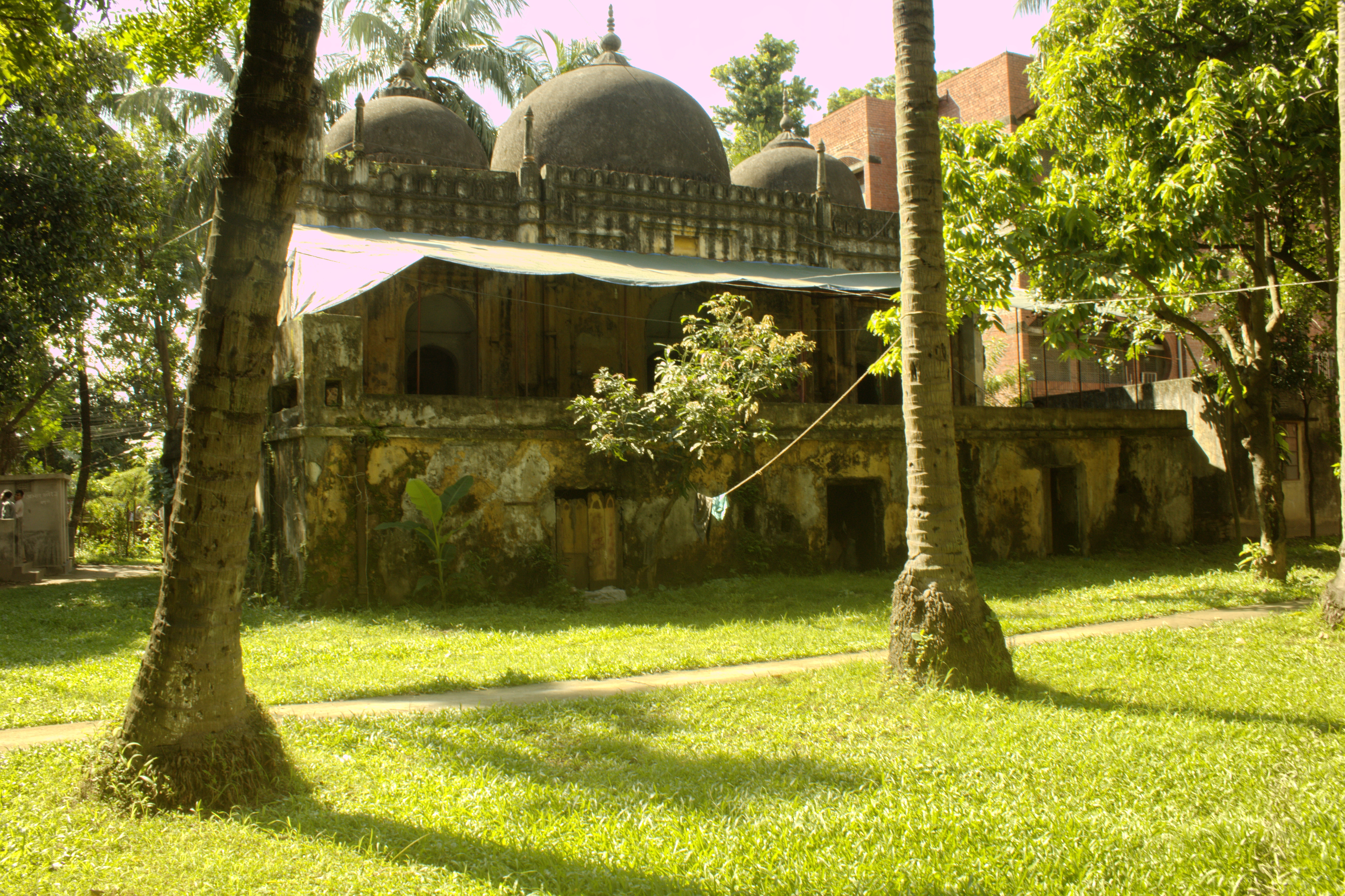

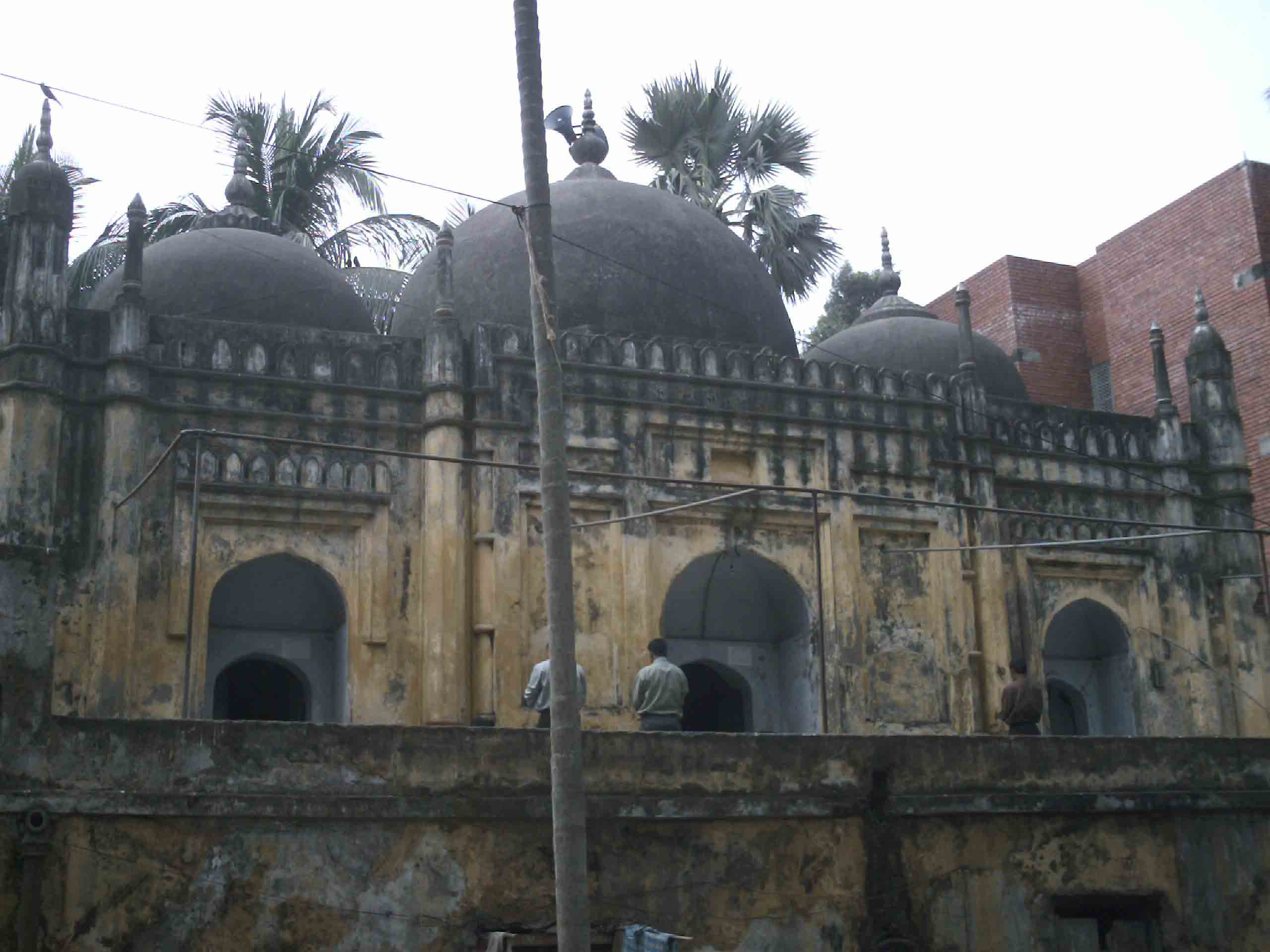

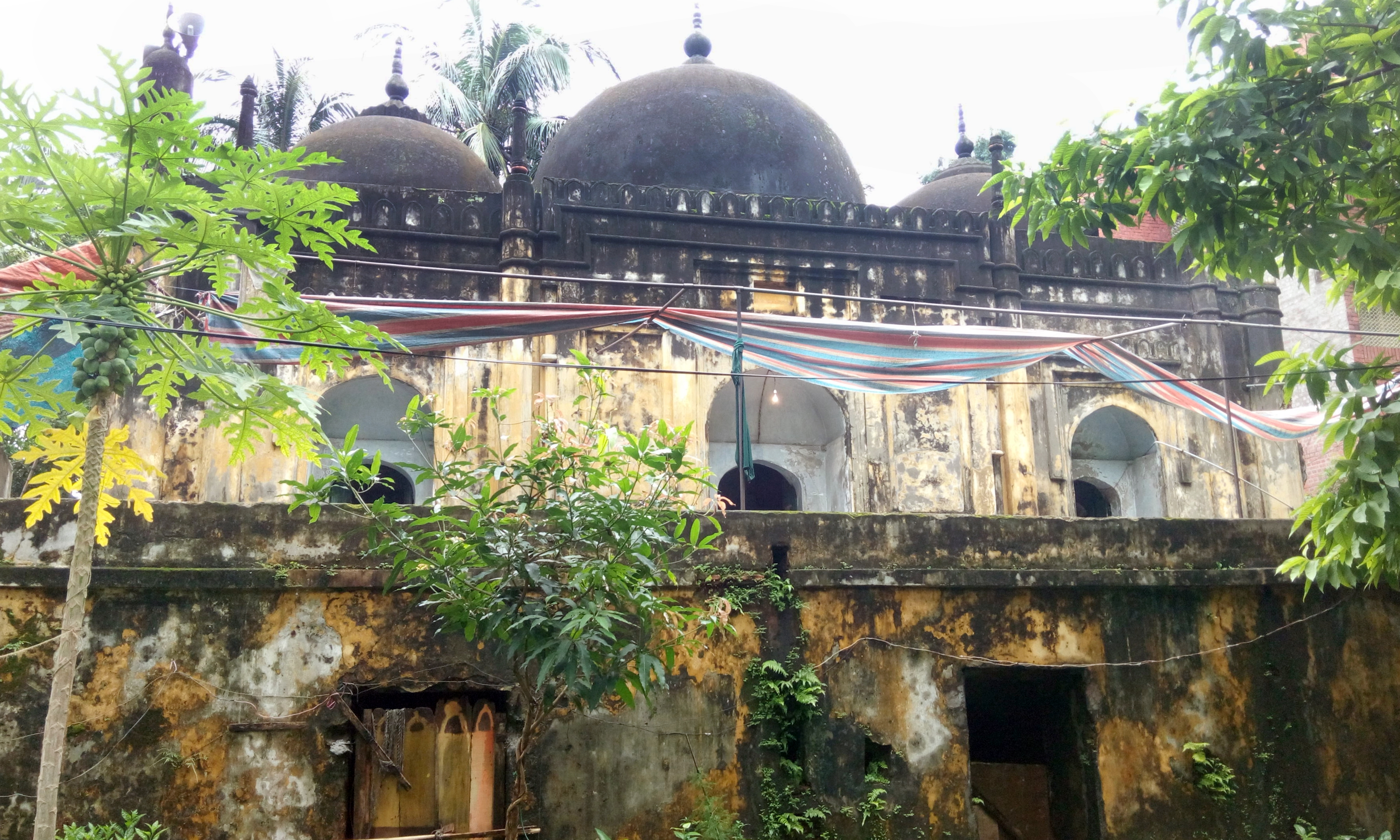

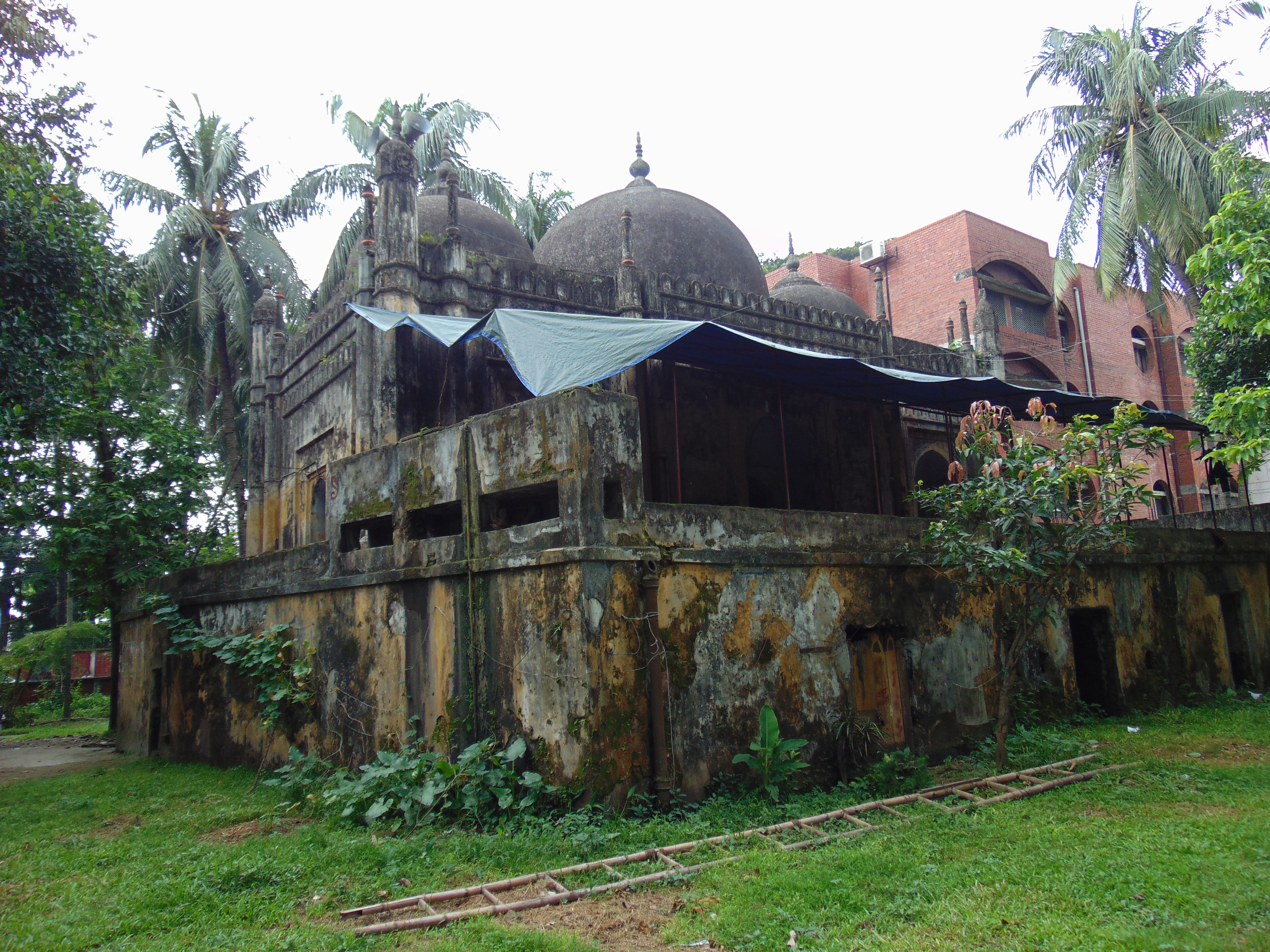

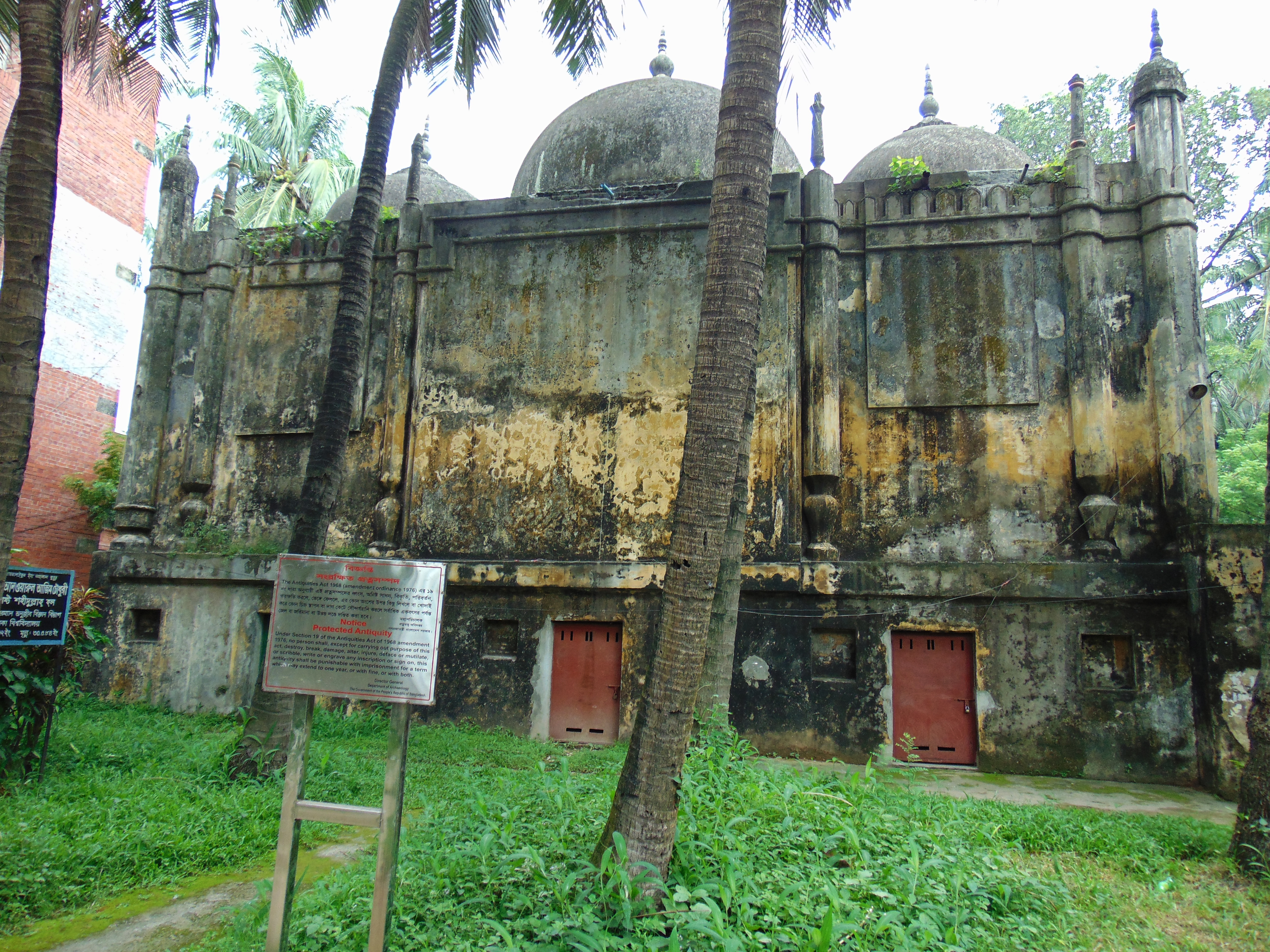

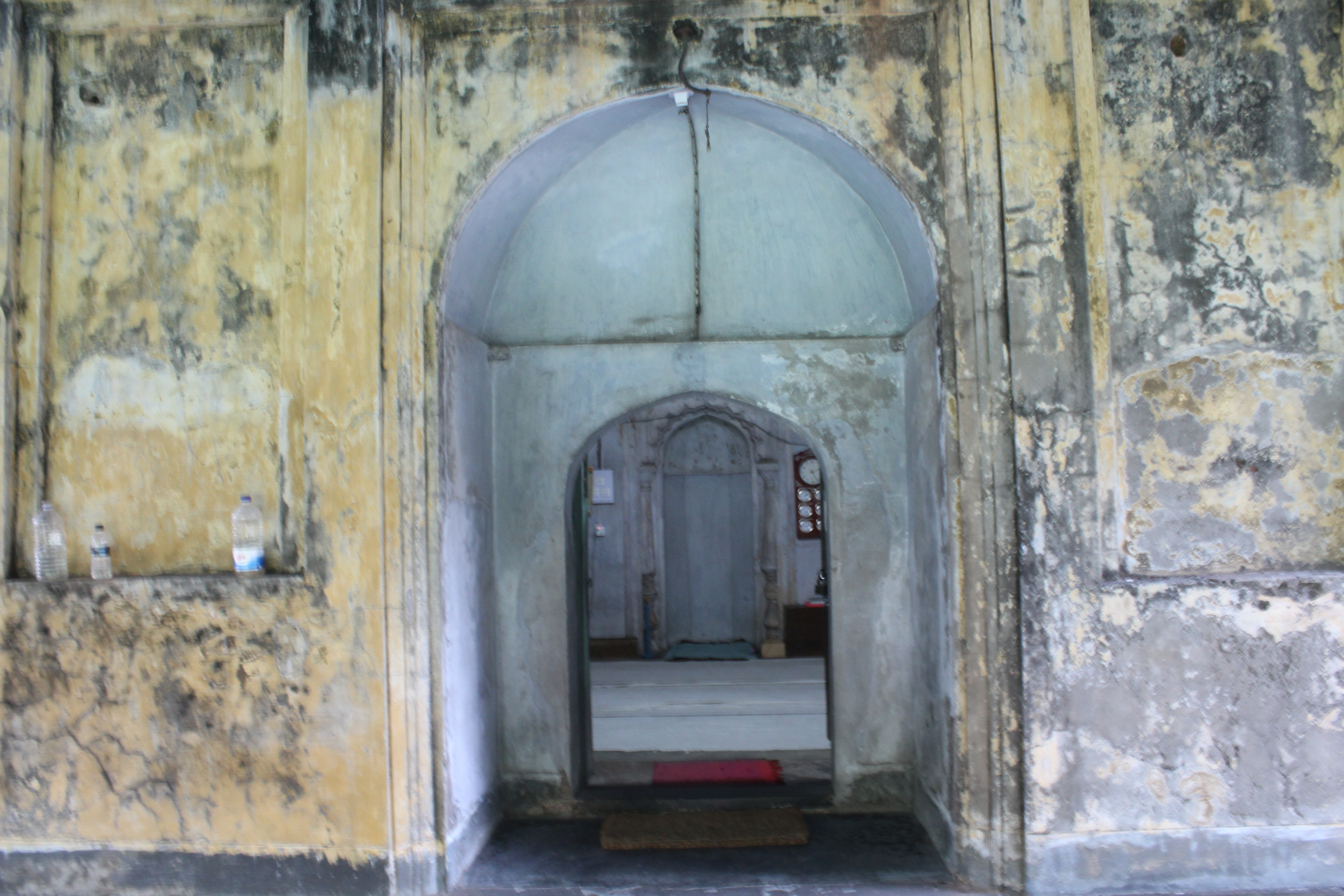

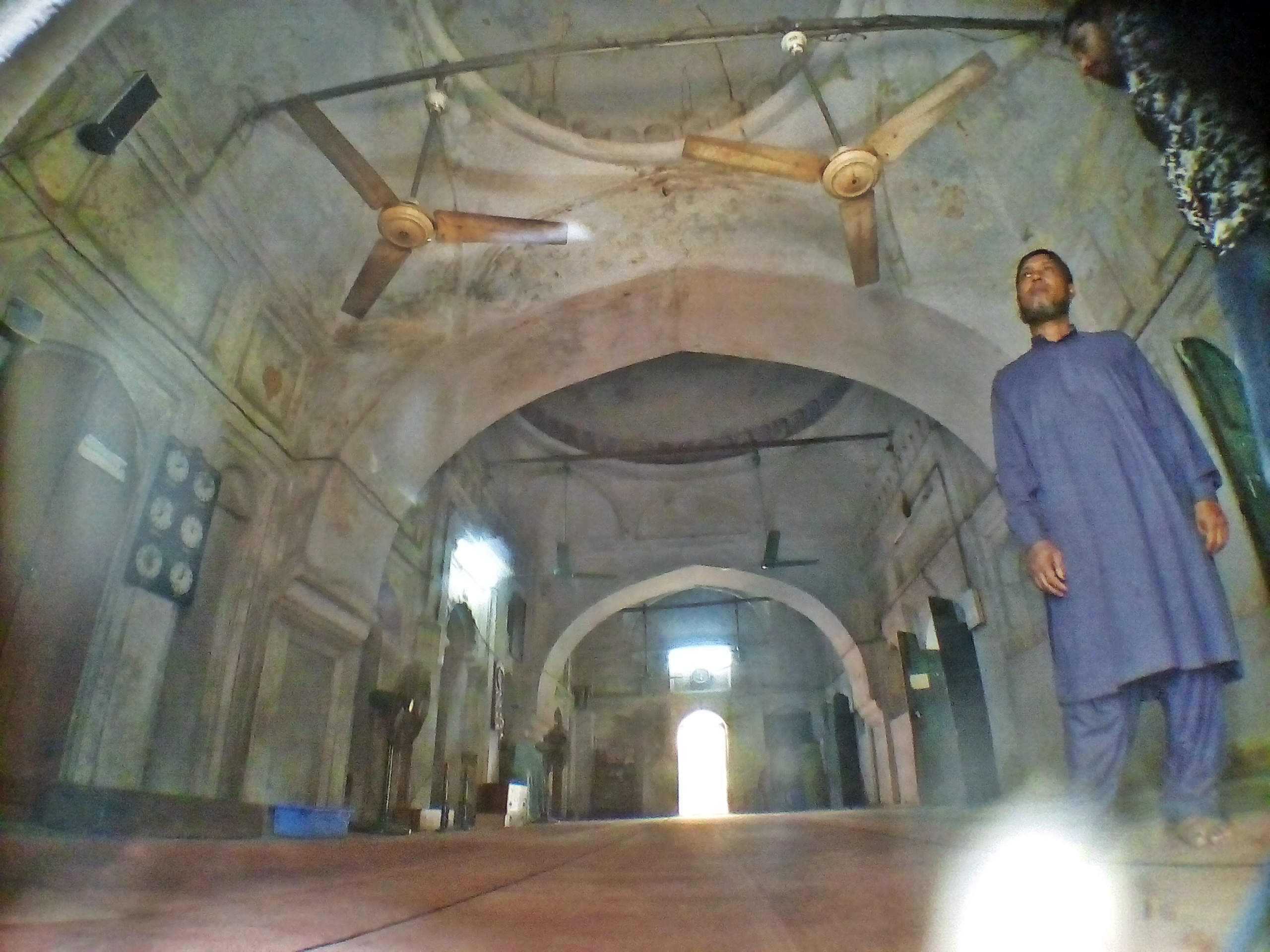

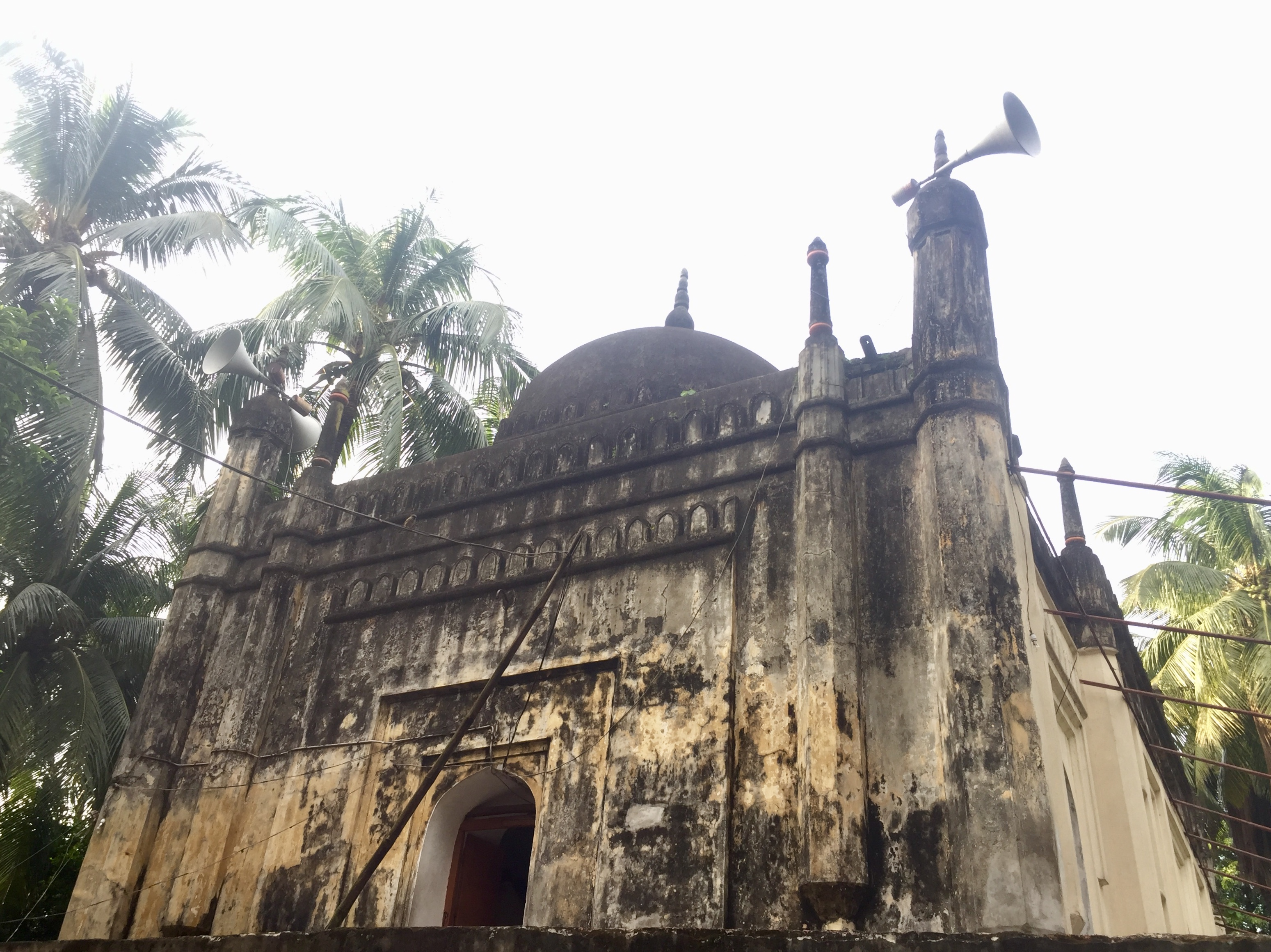

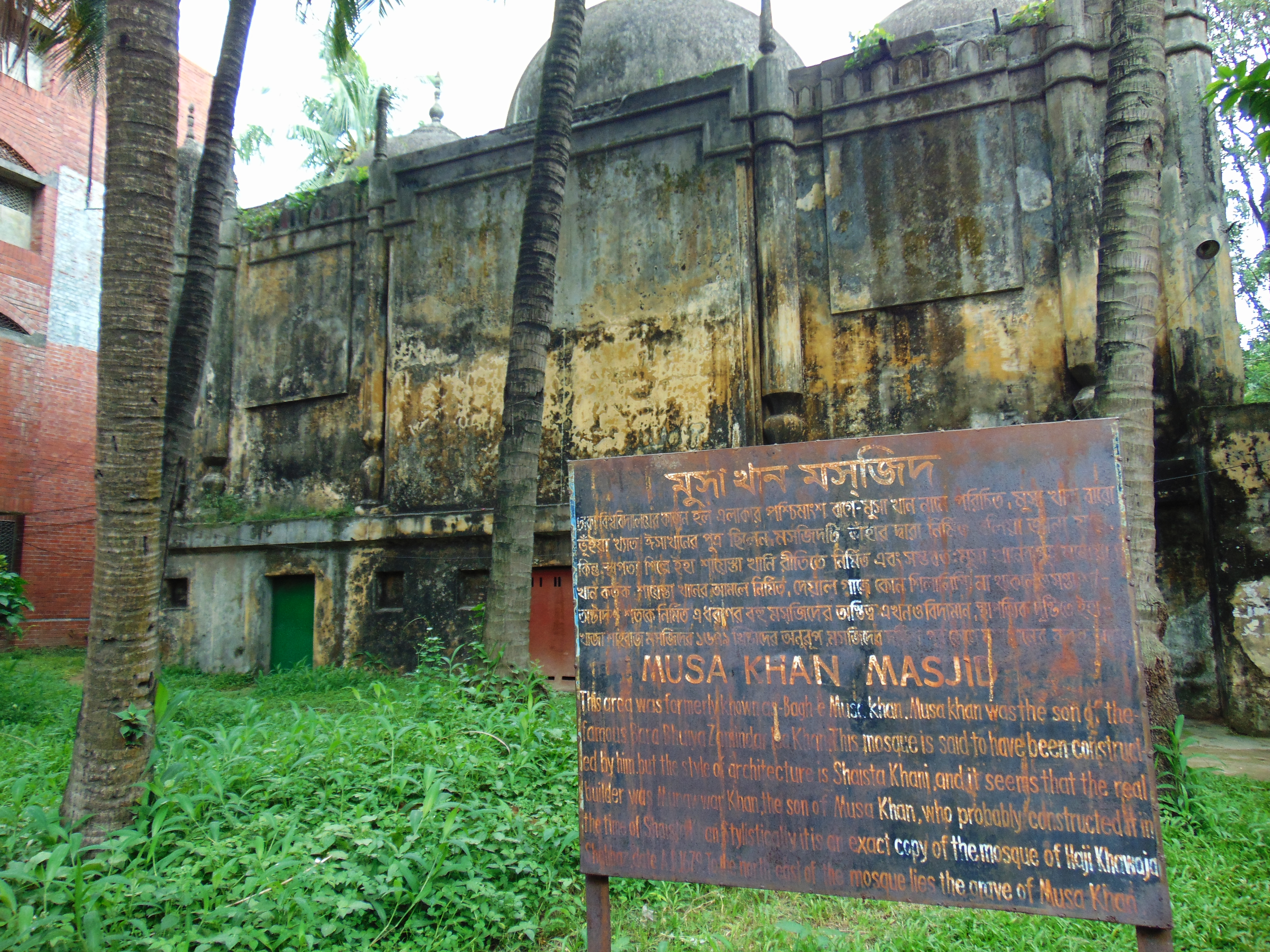

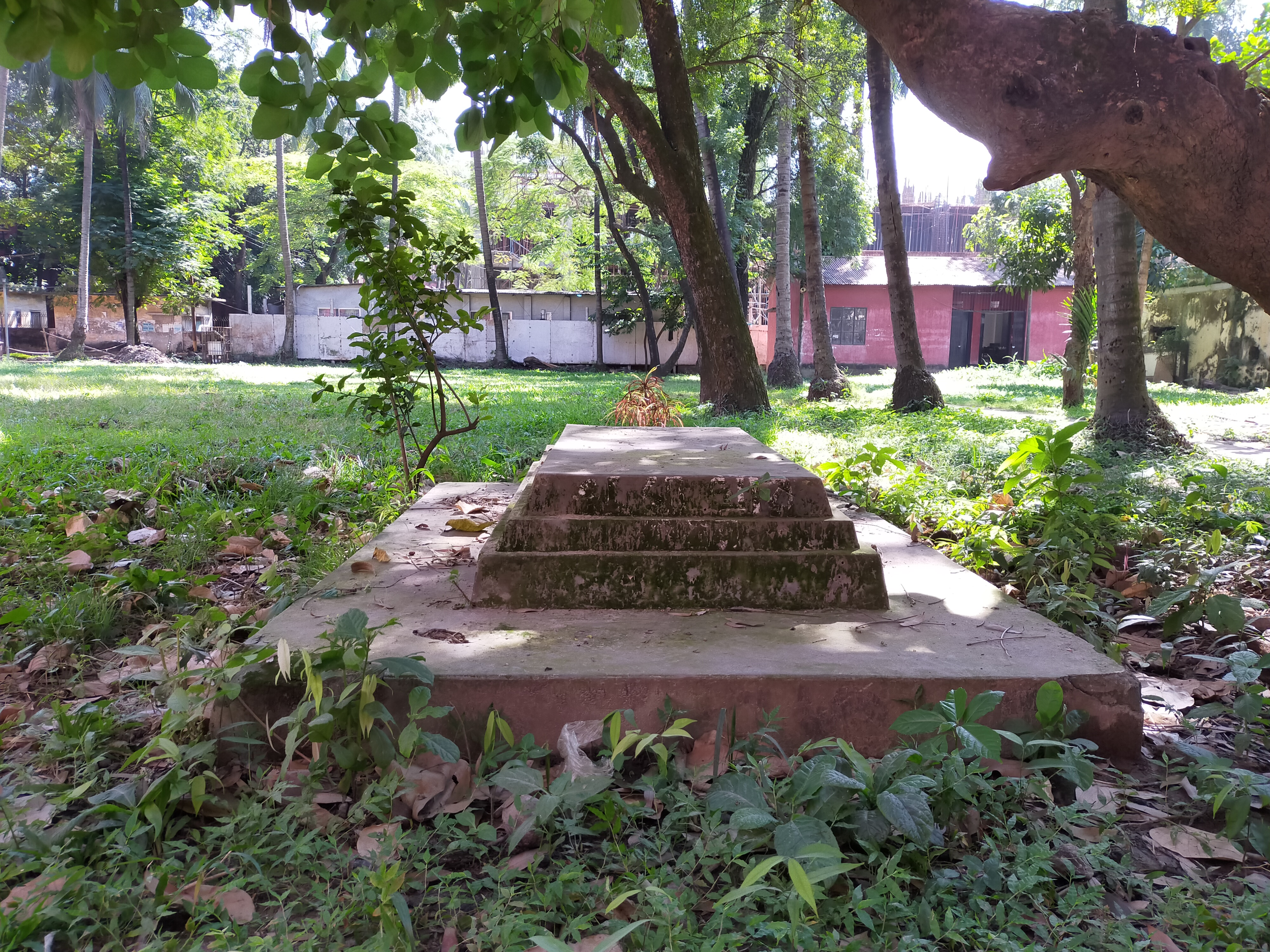
Grave of Musa Khan at the north-east corner

== See also ==
- Islam in Bangladesh
- List of mosques in Bangladesh
- List of archaeological sites in Bangladesh
