= Leila Arjumand Banu =

Bangladeshi singer and social activist

- লায়লা আর্জুমান্দ বানু
- Born: 5 January 1929
- Died: 10 February 1995 (aged 66)
- Education: Dhaka University
- Spouse: Shamsul Huda Chaudhury
- Parents: Syed Muhammed Taifoor (father); Sara Taifoor (mother)
- Relatives: Syed Ibrahim Danishmand (ancestor)

Leila Arjumand Banu (Bengali: লায়লা আর্জুমান্দ বানু; 5 January 1929 – 10 February 1995) was a Bangladeshi singer and social activist.

== Early life and education ==
Banu was born on 5 January 1929, to a Bengali Muslim family of zamindars who held lands in Sonargaon. Her father, Syed Muhammed Taifoor, was the son of zamindar Syed Abdul Aziz. Through her paternal great-grandfather Mir Ghulam Mustafa Al-Husayni, she was a descendant of 16th-century Islamic scholar and zamindar Syed Ibrahim Danishmand. She graduated from Eden Girls' School in Dhaka and did her undergraduate degree in Persian and Philosophy from the University of Dhaka. Her education was encouraged and supported by her father.

== Career ==
Banu trained under Ustad Gul Mohammad Khan in classical South Asian music, like Ghazal, Nazrul Geeti, and Rabindra Sangeet. She also sang folk and more modern songs. Her first professional performance was a solo at the inaugural broadcast of All India Radio on 16 December 1939 in Dhaka. She became the first Muslim singer to perform on Dhaka Radio at the age of ten.

From 1977 to 1986 she was an honorary Principal of Dhaka Music College. She served as the trustee of the Dhaka Museum. She was also the chairperson of the Nazrul Swaralipi Suddhikaran Board (Nazrul Notation Authentication Board) for 10 years.

== Awards ==
A partial list of Banu's awards:

- Coronation Medal from the Shah of Iran (1968)
- Pride of Performance award from the President of Pakistan (1969)
