= Musa Khan of Bengal =

Bengali zaminder and ruler of Bhati (r. 1599–1610)

Musa Khan মূসা খাঁ
- Ruler of Bhati (region); Chief of the Baro-Bhuyan
- Reign: 29 August 1599 – 10 July 1610
- Predecessor: Isa Khan
- Successor: Masum Khan
- Died: April 1623; Jahangirnagar, Bengal Subah, Mughal Empire
- Burial: Bagh-i-Musa-Khan
- House: Jangalbari Fort
- Father: Isa Khan
- Religion: Sunni Islam

Musa Khan (Bengali: মূসা খাঁ; died April 1623) was a Bengali zamindar and the ruler of Bhati, a region in medieval Bengal that covered the greater districts of Dhaka, Mymensingh, Comilla, and Sylhet in present-day Bangladesh. He also served as the chief of the Baro-Bhuyans, a confederation of soldier-landowners who aimed to resist the Mughal invasion of Bengal and to continue the legacy of his father, Isa Khan.

== Early life and family ==
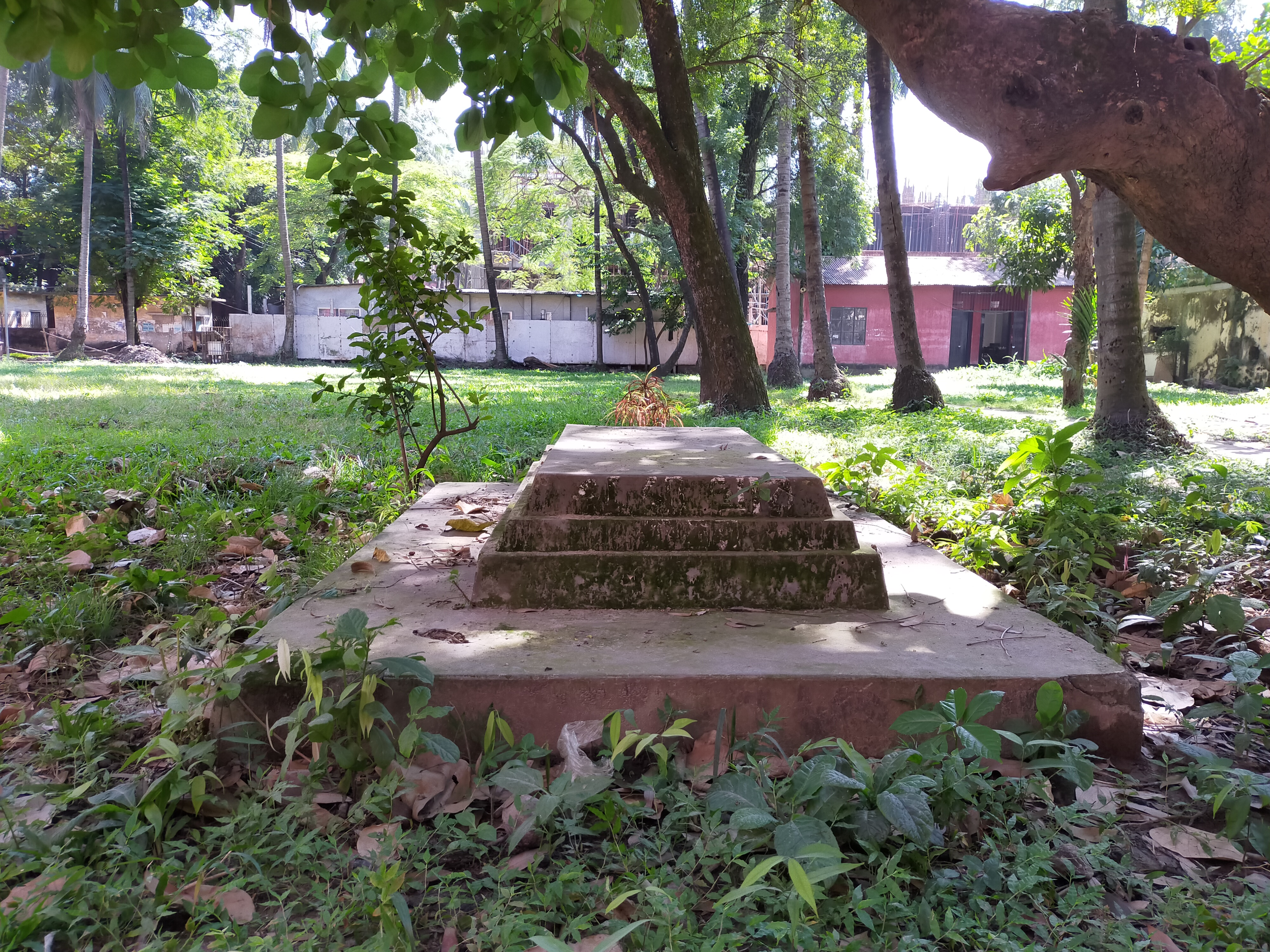
Musa Khan's grave, at the Musa Khan Mosque premises, Dhaka University.

Musa Khan was the eldest son of Isa Khan, probably by his first wife Fatima Bibi, who was the daughter of Ibrahim Danishmand. Khan's grandfather, Kalidas Gazdani, served as Dewan and accepted Islam under the guidance of Ibrahim Danishmand, taking on the name Sulaiman Khan. Sulaiman Khan, married the Sultan's daughter, Syeda Momena Khatun, and received the Zamindari of Sarail which passed onto Musa Khan's father. Musa Khan had two younger brothers, Abdullah Khan and Mahmud Khan. Along with his maternal cousin Alaul Khan, the three of them assisted Musa Khan when he was fighting against the Mughals. He also had another brother called Ilyas Khan who later surrendered to the Mughals.

== Career ==
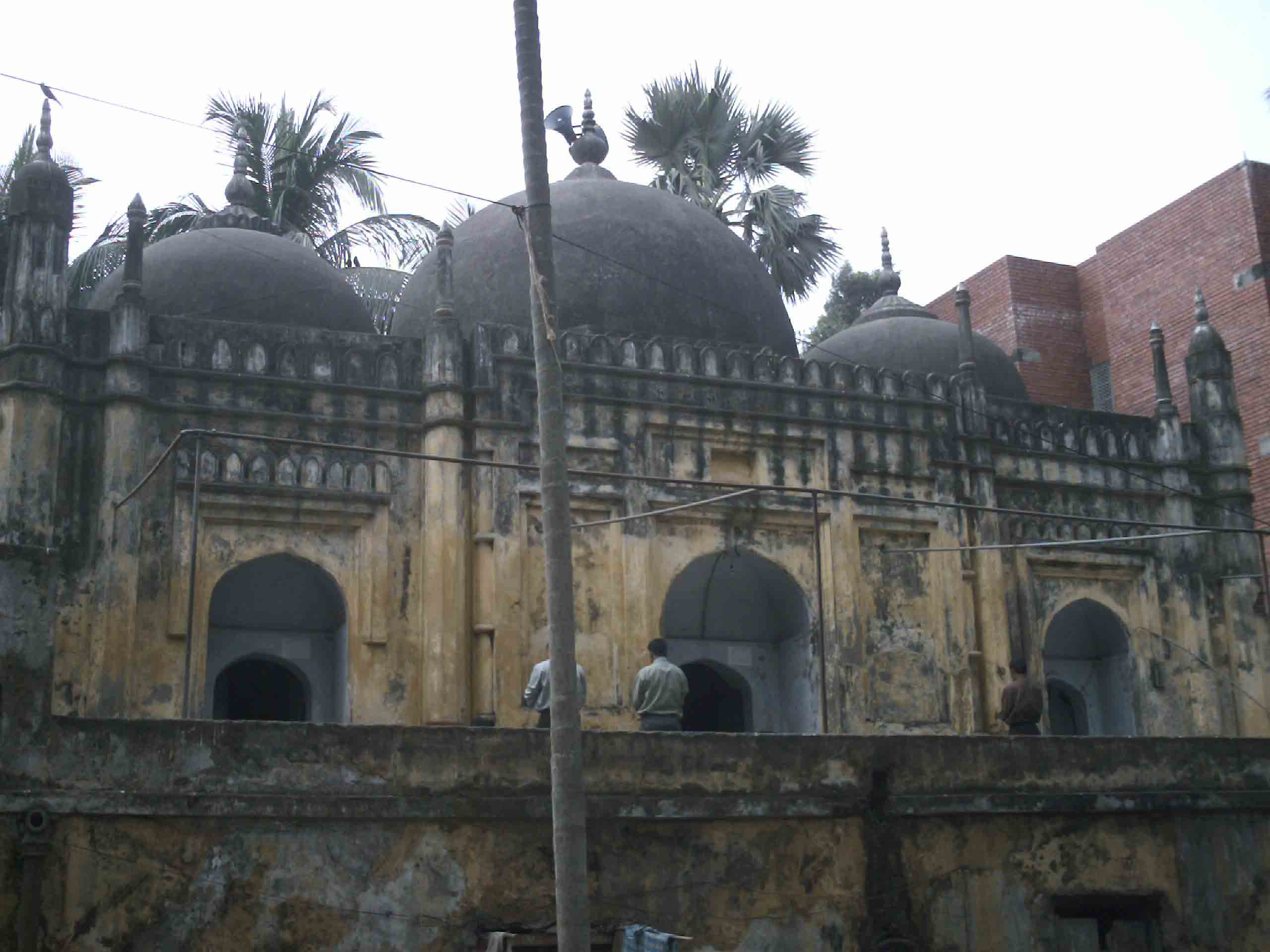
The Musa Khan Mosque built by his son remains his legacy.

After the death of his father in 1599, Musa Khan inherited the throne of Sonargaon, gaining the vast territory of Bhati and becoming the chief of the Baro-Bhuiyan landlords of Bengal. Continuing his father's legacy, he resisted Mughal invasion for over a decade until he was forced to submit to the Mughal Emperor Jahangir on 10 July 1610. He was then dethroned and imprisoned by Islam Khan Chishti, the army general of Emperor Jahangir and Subahdar of Bengal Subah.

During the office of Subahdar Ibrahim Khan Fath-i-Jang (1617-1624), Musa Khan became loyal to the Mughal force and was freed. He actively participated in the conquest of Tripura and the suppression of revolt in Kamrup.

== Death ==
Musa Khan died in 1623 in the city of Jahangirnagar (now Dhaka), and was succeeded by his son Masum Khan. He was buried in a place known as Bagh-i-Musa Khan (Musa Khan's garden). A mosque, known as the Musa Khan Mosque, was built near his tomb by his son, Diwan Munawwar Khan. The tomb and mosque are situated within a present-day residence hall compound of Dhaka University.
