= Isa Khan =

Chief of Baro-Bhuiyans of Bengal

Isa Khan ঈশা খাঁ
- Masnad-i-Ala
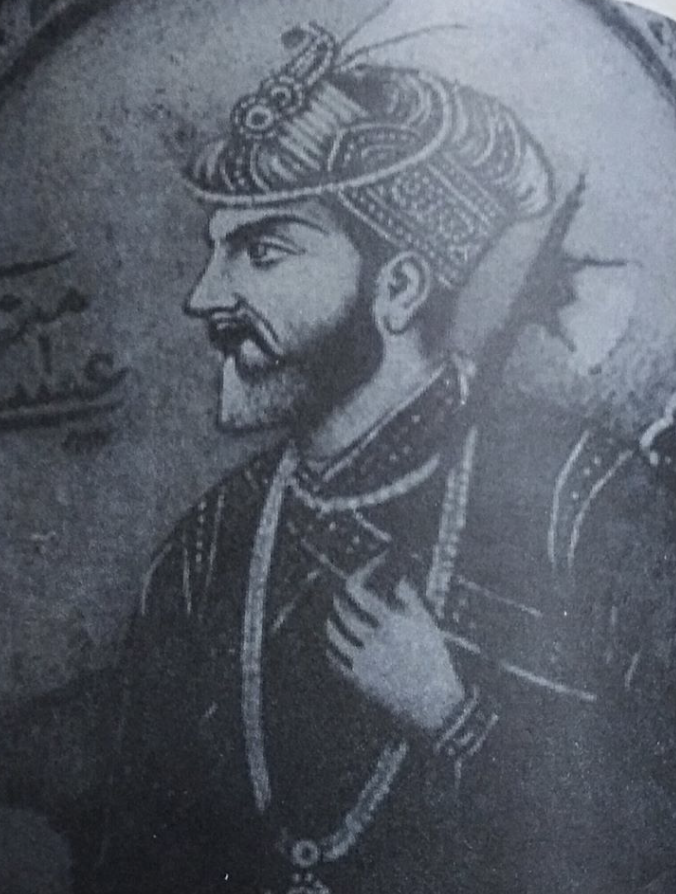

Chief of Baro-Bhuyan of Bengal
- Reign: 1576 – 29 August 1599
- Born: 17 April 1536; Sarail, Bhati, Bengal Sultanate
- Died: 29 August 1599 (age 63); Baktarpur, Bhati, Baro-Bhuyan Confederacy
- Burial: Baktarpur, Kaliganj Upazila, Gazipur, Bangladesh
- Spouse: Fatema Khatun; Sona Bibi
- Issue: Musa; Dawud; Mahmud; Abdullah; Ilyas; Aram; Biram
- Father: Sulaiman Khan
- Mother: Syeda Momena Khatun
- Religion: Sunni Islam

Isa Khan (Middle Bengali: ঈশা খাঁ, 17 April 1536 – 29 August 1599) was one of the 16th-century Baro-Bhuyan chieftains of Bengal. During his reign, he successfully unified the chieftains of Bengal and resisted the Mughal invasion of Bengal. It was only after his death that the region fell totally under Mughal control. He remains an iconic figure throughout Bangladesh as a symbol of his rebellious spirit and unity.

== Early life ==
=== Ancestry ===
Isa Khan was born on 17 April 1536 into a zamindar family known as the Dewans of Sarail in the Bhati region of the Sultanate of Bengal. There are conflicting accounts regarding his origins. According to one tradition, his grandfather Bhagirat was a Bais Rajput from Oudh who came to Bengal in search of fortune. His father, Sulaiman Khan, originally named Kalidas Gajdani, converted to Islam and carved out a principality in Bhati. Another account suggests Isa Khan was of Afghan origin. Abu'l Fazl, in his Ain-i-Akbari, calls him "Isa Afghan", though in the Akbarnama he later claims him as Bais Rajput in origin. Isa Khan's mother, Syeda Momena Khatun, was the daughter of Sultan Mahmud Shah. His maternal aunt was married to Khidr Khan Surak. Isa had one younger brother, Ismail Khan, and one sister, Shahinsha Bibi.

Following the death of Sultan Mahmud Shah, Isa's father declared himself as the legal successor and revolted against the Sur Empire. He was later killed in battle.

=== Rise to power ===
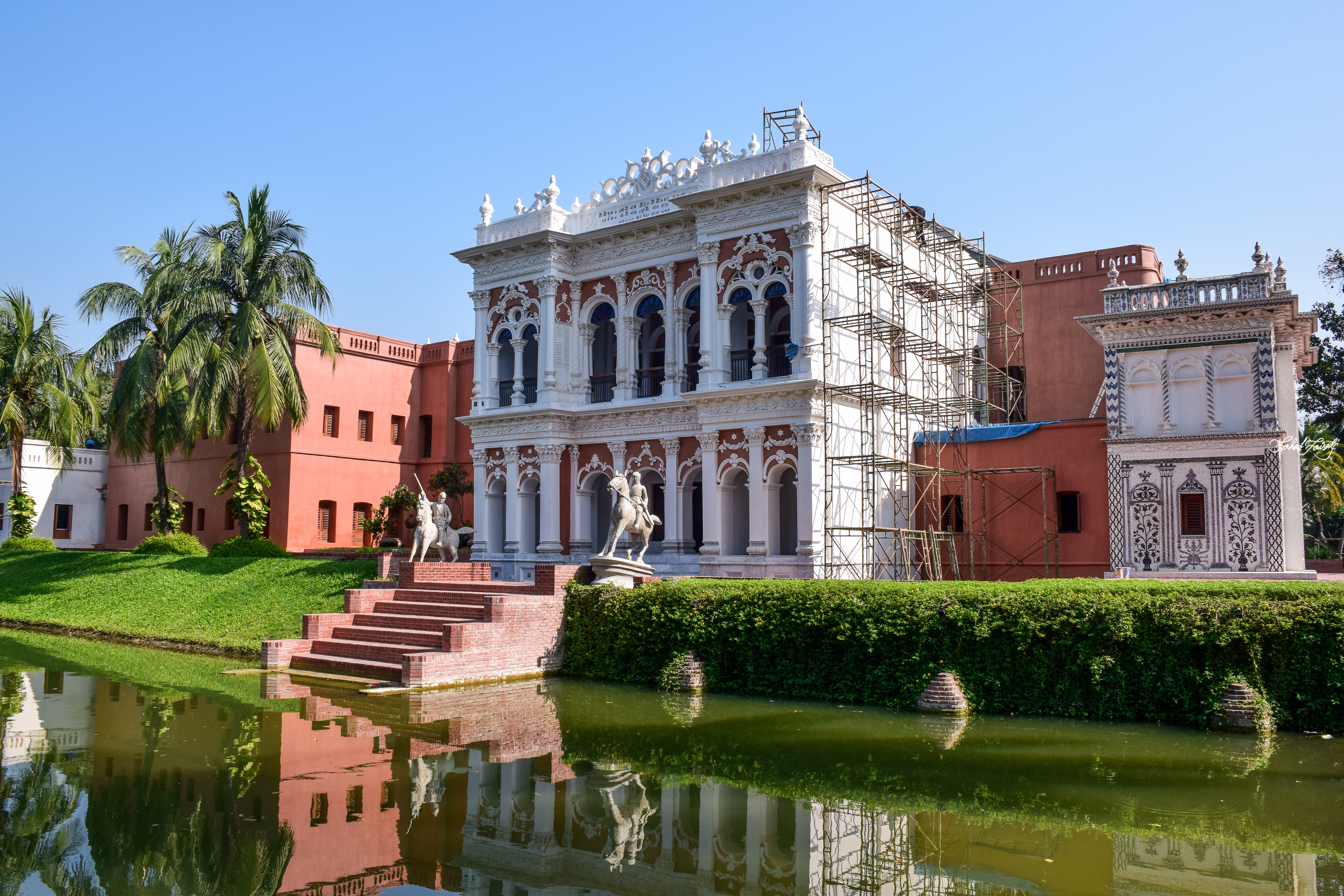
Bara Sardar Bari called Isa Khan's zamindar bari in Sonargaon

With the help of Taj Khan, a Karrani ruler during 1564–1566, Isa obtained an estate in Sonargaon and Maheswardi Pargana in 1564 as a vassal of the Karrani dynasty of Bengal. He gradually increased his power in the Bhati region by making alliances with other zamindars and helping fellow Afghan chieftains. In 1573 he helped Daud Khan Karrani in his expedition to Chittagong against Udai Manikya, the Maharaja of Tripura.

From the inscription on a cannon, it is known that by 1593-1594 Isa Khan was using the title Masnad-i-Ala. Various theories have been put forward regarding who might have granted him the title. Historian Abdul Karim believes he assumed the title himself sometime after 1581–1582.

== Ruler of Bhati and resistance ==
The rule of the Karrani dynasty ended when Daud Khan was defeated in the Battle of Rajmahal in 1576. Isa started playing a leading role in the local resistance. In the end he successfully conquered parts of Dhaka, Rangpur, Pabna, Tripura, Mymensingh, and Bogra. In 1577, Isa established Egarasindhur (in present-day Pakundia Upazila, Kishoreganj) as the political and trading centre of his realm. Forming a petty kingdom that remained independent. He declared himself as the ruler of the Bhati region in 1581–82. From Sarail, he shifted his administrative centre to Sonargaon. He built fortresses at Katrabo, Kalagachhia, and Khizrpur near Sonargaon.

=== Battle against Khan Jahan ===
In 1578, Mughal Subahdar of Bengal, Subahdar Khan Jahan led an expedition towards the Bhati region and set camp in Bhawal. Isa faced the Mughal force led by Shah Bardi and Muhammad Quli on the Sarail-Juan Shahi border in Kastul on the bank of the Meghna river. According to the Rajmala, Isa then quickly retreated to Tripura and sought assistance from the then Maharaja of Tripura, Amar Manikya. With the good grace of the queen Amrabati, the king granted an army of 52,000 men to help Isa face the Mughals.

However, before Isa returned to Sarail, two zamindars – Majlis Pratap and Majlis Dilawar – had already attacked and defeated the Mughal forces under Khan Jahan. Muhammad Quli was captured, but Shah Bardi fled to Bhawal camp. Khan Jahan retreated to the city of Tandah, where he died on 19 December 1578 after a prolonged illness.

According to descriptions by Rajmala, Khan, who became the Zamindar of Sarail, sent one thousand labourers for Amar Manikya along with other Zamindars of Bengal in response to the request made by Manikya to excavate the Amar Sagar Dighi at around 1580 AD. Besides, as the naval commander of Manikya, Khan fought against the Zamindars of Taraf and Sylhet, Syed Musa and Fateh Khan, respectively, in 1581.

=== Battle against Shahbaz Khan ===
In 1583, Mughal General Shahbaz Khan destroyed Isa's palace in Baktiarpur. In September 1584, the then-subahdar Shahbaz crossed the Ganges near Khizirpur and attacked Sonargaon, Katrabo, and Egarasindhur and pursued the defeated Pathan forces under Masum Kabuli up to Bikrampur in Dhaka. The cunning Isa then pretended to negotiate for surrender and delayed the attack of the Mughal general for several months. However, in 1584, Isa and Masum Khan Kabuli, deploying musket and gunpowder artilleries, launched a counterattack that finally defeated Shahbaz Khan in the naval and land battles of Egarasindur and Bhawal, and even killing one of the Mughal general. After that, Shahbaz Khan retreated to Tandah.

=== Battle against Laksmana Singh Hajra ===
In 1585, he attacked two Koch rulers, Ram Hazra and Lakshman Hazra, and occupied their Jangalbari Fort (in present-day Karimganj Upazila, Kishoreganj).

Another source from local tradition recorded that this happened in 1586 after Man Singh had defeated him in the battle of Egarasindhur. In the same year, Mughal Subahdar Shahbaz Khan again sent his forces against Isa to the south.

=== Second battle against Shahbaz Khan ===
With the help of reinforcements by Emperor Akbar, Shahbaz Khan led another military expedition towards Bhati in 1586. Isa attacked him at Bhawal (north of Dhaka), but forces of Shahbaz Khan were well fortified near Brahmaputra. Isa then chose to give allegiance to Akbar and prevented an imminent invasion of Bengal by the Mughals.

He even promised the Mughals he would dispatch Ma'sum Khan Kabuli, the renegade, on a compulsory pilgrimage to Mecca, something that was viewed as an act of banishment.

In late 1586, Ralph Fitch, an English traveler and merchant, came to Sonargaon, Bengal's eastern districts and stated,

They be all hereabout Rebels against the King Zebaldin Echebar (Jalaluddin Akbar) for here are so many Rivers and Iands, that they flee from one to another, whereby his Horsemen cannot prevaile against them. The chief King of all these Countries is called Isacan (Isa Khan), and he is chief of all the other Kings, and is a great friend to all Christians.

Later on in 1588, he was involved in conflicts against Chand Rai and Kedar Rai.

=== Battle against Raghudev ===
Isa continued his campaign against the Koch dynasty. He fought and defeated Raghudev, the king of Koch Hajo, who ruled from the Sankosh River in the west to the Bhareli River in the east on the north bank of the Brahmaputra River and was a rival to the Koch Bihar kingdom, which gained prominence after the latter's annexation by the Mughal empire. Isa captured portions of Raghudev's territory as far as Rangamati and Goalpara. However, later Isa Khan and Raghudev formed an alliance against the threat of a Mughal invasion.

=== Battle against Durjan Singh ===
On 17 March 1594, Man Singh was appointed the Subahdar of Bengal by Emperor Akbar. After establishing Rajmahal as the capital of Bengal, Man Singh set out on 9 December 1595 to wrest the East Bengal delta from Isa Khan. Isa was emboldened to resist the Mughals after he successfully sought alliance with Raghudev, his former enemy, and Kedar Rai, Zamindar of Bhusna in Faridpur. In the clash that took place in August 1597, Isa became engaged in a battle against Mughal naval forces with the assistance of Masum Khan Kabuli, an ex-Mughal defector. At first Isa faced defeat with the Mughals attacking Katrabo, one of Isa's parganas and cities. However, on 5 September, Durjan Singh was killed and the Mughal forces were defeated. Both the army and navy of the Mughal-Koch Bihar alliance were either routed or captured.It is recorded that in this clash, Isa personally fought Man Singh in a duel.

=== Death and inheritance ===
The so-called alliance between Kedar Ray and Isa Khan turned into animosity after Isa Khan allegedly abducted Kedar's widowed niece Swornomoyee, although some sources state she willingly fled to Isa Khan. Rattled by this, Kedar Ray invaded Isa Khan's capital, tearing down the Kalagachhia and other forts one after the other up until his death in 1599. Following Ray's attacks, Isa soon fled to Medinipur.

Khan died in September 1599. His tomb remains in the village of Baktarpur in Kaliganj Upazila, Gazipur District of Bangladesh.

After Isa's death, his son Musa Khan inherited the throne of Sonargaon, gaining the vast territory of Bhati and becoming the chief of the Baro-Bhuiyan landlords of Bengal. Continuing his father's legacy, he resisted Mughal invasion for over a decade until he was forced to submit to the Mughal Emperor Jahangir on 10 July 1610.

== Family ==
=== Marriage ===
Khan first married his maternal cousin Fatima Bibi, a daughter of his aunt Raushan Akhtar Banu and her husband Syed Ibrahim Danishmand. Later he married Sarnamoyee, the daughter of Chand Rai of Sripur. After her abduction, Sarnamoyee was won by the courage of Isa Khan and converted to Islam, taking the name Sona Bibi and actively helped her husband to defend his kingdom. Isa had two sons with Sona Bibi named Aram and Biram, both of whom married the daughters of their maternal uncle, Kedar Roy.

=== Issue ===
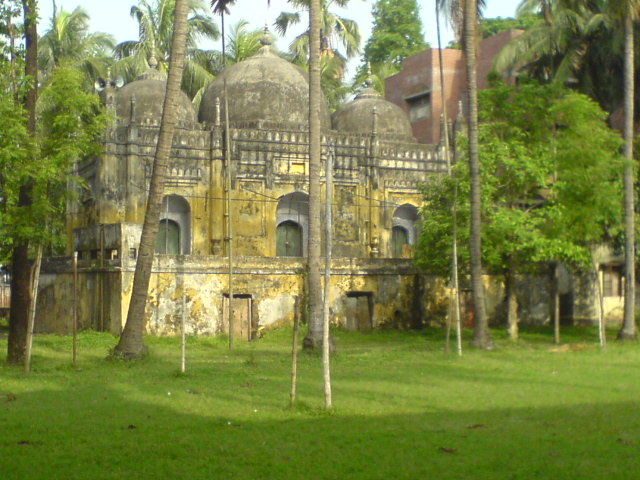
Grave of Musa Khan, the son of Isa Khan, in Dhaka, Bangladesh

Khan's son, Musa Khan, took control of Sonargaon after his death. On 10 July 1610, Musa was dethroned by Mughal General Islam Khan Chisti. After that, the descendants of Isa left Sonargaon and settled in Jangalbari Fort. Masum Khan was the eldest son of Musa Khan. Masum served as the Mughal army general during the Hughly invasion in 1632. His eldest son was Monwar Khan. Monwar acted as the chief of the Bengal Zamindars' flotilla on the conquest of Chittagong in 1666. Monwar, leading naval ships armed with bronze 9.5 inches cannons, recovered Chittagong from the Portuguese. A village called Monwarbagh, in Bandar Upazila of Narayanganj District, was named after him. Haybat Khan, another grandson of Musa, established Haybatnagar (in present-day Kishoreganj district) and made it the centre of his land-lordship of seven parganas.

James Wise (d. 1886), a civil surgeon in Dhaka for 10 years, published a report on Baro-Bhuyans in Journal of the Asiatic Society of Bengal, volume 43, in 1874. He found information from the account of his meeting with the descendants of Isa in Jangalbari and Haybatnagar. He addressed Isa as the Zamindar of Khizirpur. The Haybatnagar family had possessed sanads sent by Shah Shuja in 1649 and another one from Shaista Khan in 1667. Subhan Dad Khan had been the head of the family in Jangalbari in 1874. The other descendant of the Haybatnagar family, Ilah Nawaz Khan, had died in Calcutta in 1872. Other branches of the family had settled in Jafarabad, Baghalpur, Mymensingh, Harishpur (Tripura), Katrabo (Dhaka), and Barisal. The wealth, property, and zamindari were distributed amongst the descendants, which is why they each lived in different parts of the country.

As of 2005, Dewan Amin Dau Khan, the 14th descendant of Isa has been living in Jangalbari Fort in Egarasindur village. The fort seemed to have a circular front and had 40 rooms. The fort was mostly destroyed during an earthquake in 1893.

== Legacy ==
On 12 February 1909, a farmer unearthed seven cannons in Monwarbagh in Bandar, Narayanganj. The cannons were partly made of brass. They had labels "Isa Khan" and "1002" (Hijri 1002 year is 1593 CE in Gregorian Calendar). These cannons were made from the era of Sher Shah Suri who ruled Bengal before the Bara Bhuiyans while at least three cannons which carved with Isa Khan labels were made during the Baro-Bhuyans independent era.

Bangladesh Navy has named a base, BNS Issa Khan in his honour. The base, BNS Issa Khan, was the first Bangladesh Navy base to receive the national standard in 1974.

On 15 September 1992, Bangladesh issued a commemorative stamp in honour of Isa.

A jatra, named Isa Khan, depicting the life of Isa, written by Bhoironnath Gangopadhyay and directed by Mridul Kanti Dey, was staged on the premises of Bangladesh Lok O Karu Shilpa Foundation on 18 October 2012.

== See also ==
- Bhati (region)
- History of Bengal
  - Karrani dynasty
- Khwaja Usman
- 24 Parganas

== Original sources ==
=== Primary ===
- Akbar-nama/Book of Akbar Volume 3:Ain-i-Akbari
- Memoirs of Bengal by Ralph Fitch
- Tarikh-i-Sher Shahi
- Chronicle of Bhara Buiyans by Baharistan-i-Ghaibi

=== Secondary ===
- NK Bhattasali, Bengal Chiefs' Struggle for Independence in the Reign of Akbar and Jahangir, Bengal Past and Present, 38, 1929;
- MA Rahim, The History of the Afghans in India, Karachi, 1961;
- Abdul Karim, History of Bengal (Mughal Period), I, Rajshahi, 1992.
