= Ismail Khan of Bengal =

16th-century Bengali nobleman

Ismail Khan
- Died: Sultanate of Bengal
- Father: Sulaiman Khan
- Mother: Syeda Momena Khatun

Ismail Khan (Bengali: ইসমাঈল খাঁ, Bengali pronunciation: [ismail kʰã]) was a nobleman of the Sultanate of Bengal. He was the brother of Isa Khan, the leader of the Baro-Bhuiyan confederacy.

== Biography ==
His father, Dewan Sulaiman Khan (formerly Kalidas Gazdani), inherited this position and converted to Sunni Islam. Ismail Khan's mother, Syeda Momena Khatun, was the daughter of Sultan Mahmud Shah. His maternal aunt was married to Khidr Khan Surak, the governor of Bengal from 1539 to 1541 under the Sur Empire. Ismail had one brother, Masnad-i-Ali Isa Khan, who would later rule Bengal, and one sister, Shahinsha Bibi.

During the reign of Islam Shah Suri in 1545, Muhammad Khan Sur was appointed as the Governor of Bengal and responsible for warding off rebellious chieftains in the region. Ismail's father was given the death penalty. A force led by Taj Khan and Dariya Khan were dispatched against them, and despite strong resistance from the Dewans, Ismail's father Sulaiman was eventually killed in the conflict. Ismail, and his elder brother Isa Khan, were subsequently taken as captives and later sold as slaves to Iranian traders in Turan.

In 1563, the Karrani dynasty took control of Bengal and Bihar. Ismail's uncle, Dewan Qutbuddin Khan, was employed in the court of Sultan Taj Khan Karrani and successfully traced his nephews. Qutbuddin Khan managed to free Ismail and Isa by buying them from their owners.

== See also ==
- History of Bangladesh
