= Fath Shah's Mosque =

Mosque in Sonargaon, Bangladesh

- ফতেহ শাহ মসজিদ
- Fath Shah's Mosque plan

- Location within Bangladesh

Religion
- Affiliation: Islam
- Status: Active

Location
- Location: Sonargaon, Narayanganj District, Bangladesh
- Interactive map of Fath Shah's Mosque
- Coordinates: 23.634887°N 90.587101°E

Architecture
- Type: Mosque architecture
- Style: Bengal Sultanate
- Established: 1484 AD

Specifications
- Length: 10.35 m (34.0 ft)
- Width: 7.95 m (26.1 ft)
- Interior area: 40.04 m^{2} (431.0 ft^{2})
- Dome: 1
- Inscriptions: 2
- Materials: Brick

Fath Shah's Mosque (Bengali: ফতেহ শাহ মসজিদ) is a medieval mosque situated in the dargah complex in Nagar Sadipur village of Mograpara Union of Sonargaon, Narayanganj. The area was part of the medieval capital of Sonargaon. It is locally known as Dargabari Shahi Jami Masjid, and is situated on the north side of the tombs of Pir Manna Shah Darvesh and Shaykh Muhammad Yusuf.

== History ==
The mosque has two inscriptions. The Persian inscription over the doorway records the date as 1700-01 AD (1112 AH). The other inscription is in Arabic and gives the date as 1484 AD (889 AH) It is likely that the mosque was originally built during the reign of Sultan Jalaluddin Fateh Shah (r. 1481–1487) and repaired or rebuilt with a new roof of dome and vaults in the Mughal period in 1700-01 Although is not known who built the mosque but judging by his titles of Muqarrab al-Daulah and Wazir of Muazzamabad (in Sonargaon) and Thana Laud (Sylhet), it is assumed the patron was a noble courtier.

== Architecture ==
The mosque, originally built during the Bengal Sultanate period, was later renovated with Mughal-style features. The original details have been lost due to restorations and repairs. The exterior is plastered, with rectangular panels, a heightened dome on a drum, and a curved cornice topped by a level parapet. The interior is plastered, whitewashed, and painted. The interior is 5.20 by 7.70 m (17.1 by 25.3 ft) with 1.60 m (5.2 ft) wall thickness. The mosque is built using bricks, with a stone central mihrab. The mosque is a rectangular with three east entrances. The central is 1.40 m (4.6 ft) wide; the other two 1.20 m (3.9 ft); one north and one south entrance is 1.30 m (4.3 ft) each wide. Entrances have smaller outer arches. North and south sides have deep arched recesses (85 cm x 70 cm). The west wall has three semicircular mihrabs, the central one largest. Two barrel vaults north and south of the dome extend the prayer chamber by 1.20 m (3.9 ft) each, forming a rectangle. These transverse arches, part of the original design, resemble those in Badr Awlia Dargah Jami Mosque in Chittagong, Qutb Shah's Mosque in Kishoreganj, and fourteenth-century mosques like Jamatkhana Mosque in Delhi and Orhan Ghazi's Mosque in Bilecik, Turkey.

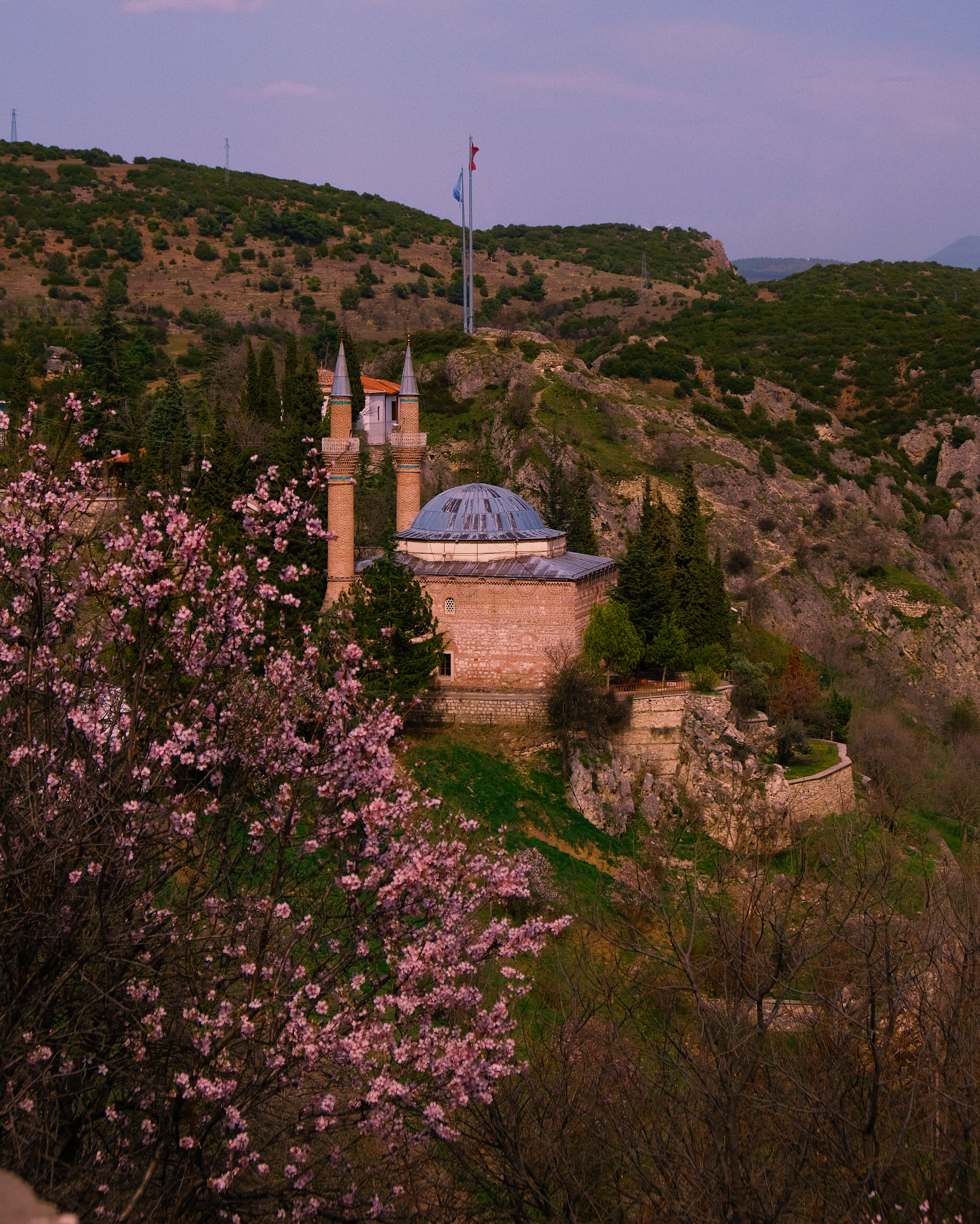
Orhan Ghazi's Mosque, Bilecik, Turkey

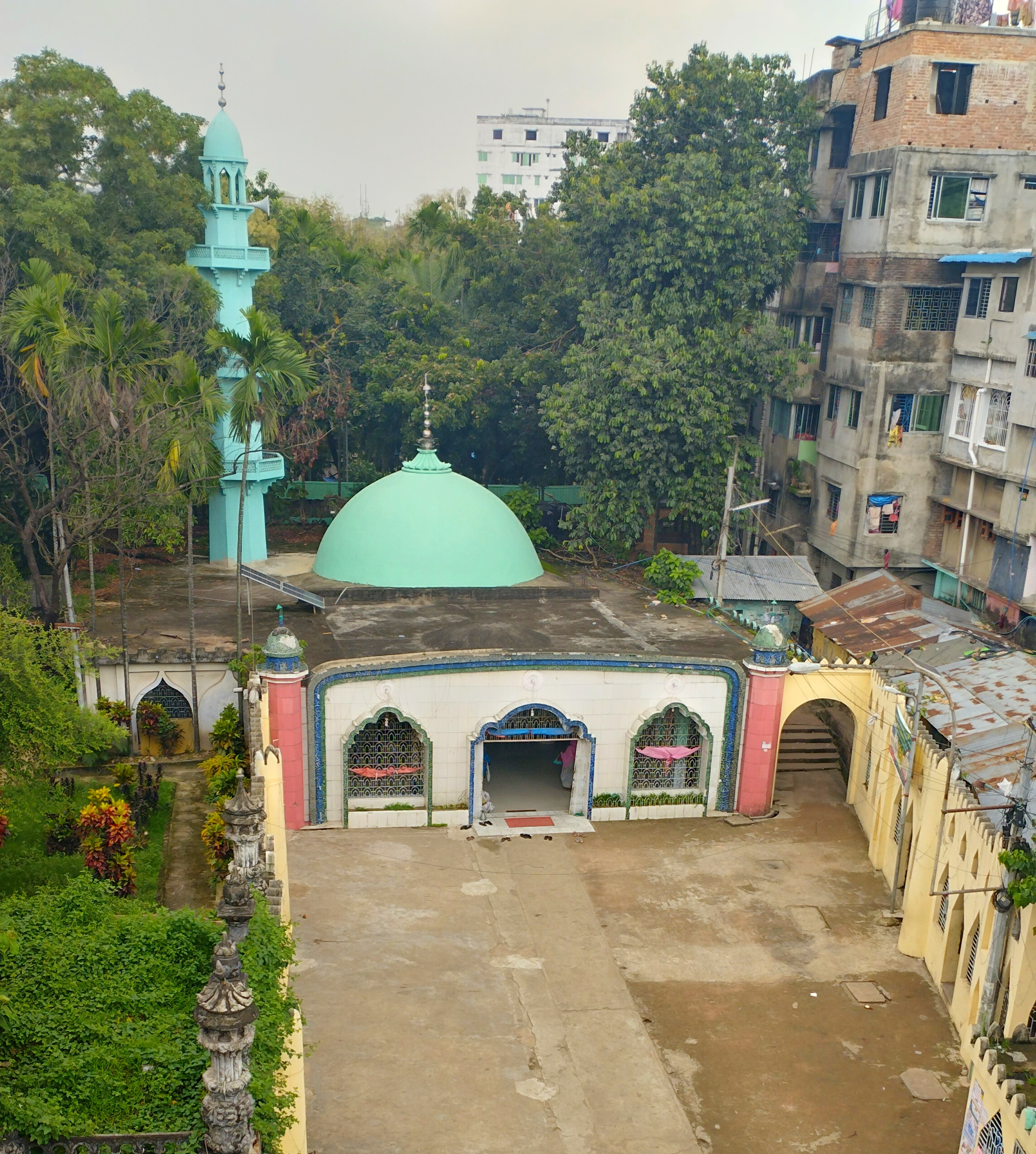
Shrine of Badr Auliya, Chittagong

== Inscriptions ==
The original Arabic Inscription, first documented by General Alexander Cunningham in 1879, is a stone tablet affixed to the enclosure wall of a mosque. The locals used to apply coat of lime over the stone believing its miraculous properties. By 1895, the stone had been relocated to the enclosure wall of a graveyard opposite the mosque. At that time, the lime was removed, allowing the inscription to be read. The stone still remains in place.

The first inscription in Arabic (1484 AD) reads as follows:

Allah the Most High says, "And the places of worship are for Allah [alone]. So invoke not anyone along with Allah' [Quran 72: 18]. And the Prophet, the peace and blessings of Allah be upon him, has said, 'He who builds a mosque, Allah will build for him seventy palaces in Heaven' [Hadith]. This mosque was built during the time of the great and exalted Sultan Jalal al-Dunya wal Din Abul Muzaffar Fath Shah, the Sultan, son of Mahmud Shah, the Sultan, may Allah perpetuate his kingdom and sovereignty. The builder of the mosque is Muqarrab al-Daulat (favourite of the government) Malik... al-Din, the governor, the extraordinary keeper of the wardrobe, and Sar-i-lashkar and Wazir of Iqlim [region] Muazzamabad, also known as Mahmudabad, and Sar-i-lashkar of Thana Laud. This [i.e., the construction of the mosque] took place in the month of Muharram of the year 889 [February 1484].

The second inscription dated back (1700-01 AD) during the Mughal period reads:

O God bless the untaught Prophet Muhammad, and his descendants and his Companions and his saints, and beautify and give him peace. Peace be upon you, O leader of saints, Commander of the Faithful, Ali, son of Abi Talib; the year 1112 [1700-1].

== See also ==
- Mughal architecture
- List of mosques in Bangladesh

== Bibliography ==
- Hasan, Perween (2024-01-25). Sultans and Mosques: The Early Muslim Architecture of Bangladesh. Bloomsbury Academic. ISBN 978-0-7556-5360-7.
- Hasan, Perween (1984). "Eight Sultanate mosques in Dhaka District". In Michell, George (ed.). The Islamic Heritage of Bengal. Paris: UNESCO. pp. 37–140. ISBN 978-92-3-102174-9.
