= Syed Muhammed Taifoor =

- Born: 3 June 1885; Dhaka, Bengal Presidency, British India
- Died: 25 February 1972 (aged 86); Dhaka, Bangladesh
- Children: Leila Arjumand Banu
- Relatives: Syed Ibrahim Danishmand (ancestor); Imran Rahman (grandson); Shahnaz Huda (granddaughter)

Syed Muhammed Taifoor (Bengali: সৈয়দ মোহাম্মদ তৈফুর; 3 June 1885 – 25 February 1972) was a Bangladeshi historian, antiquarian and writer.

== Early life ==
Taifoor was born on 3 June 1885, to a Bengali Muslim family in Dhaka, Bengal Presidency. His father, Syed Abdul Aziz, was a zamindar in nearby Sonargaon. Through his paternal grandfather Mir Ghulam Mustafa, he was a descendant of 16th-century Islamic scholar and zamindar Syed Ibrahim Danishmand. Taifoor was educated in madrasas in the cities of Dhaka and Kolkata, and gained fluency in Bengali, English, Urdu and Persian.

== Career ==
Taifoor joined the government service in 1909 as a sub-registrar. He was awarded the title Khan Shaheb by the British Raj in 1941. He retired in 1942 as Registrar of Kolkata. During the anti-British movement in India, he renounced his title, Khan Shaheb, in 1947. He served as the director of Eden Mohila College and Jagannath College. He was a member of Board of Intermediate and Secondary Education, Dhaka. He was a member of Dhaka Improvement Trust and Dhaka museum's Trustee Board. He donated over 200 artifacts to Dhaka Museum. He donated rare books and manuscripts to Asiatic Society of Pakistan (Today Asiatic Society of Bangladesh). He supported changing the spelling of Dacca to Dhaka. He published "Glimpses of Old Dhaka", on the historical evolution of the city, in 1952.

== Personal life ==
Taifoor was married to Sara Taifoor. They had three daughters, Leila Arjumand Banu, Lulu Bilquis Banu, and Malka Perveen Banu.

== Death ==
Taifoor died on 25 February 1972 in Dhaka.
