= Tandah =

Tandah (modern day Tanda) was a town in the district of Fyzabad (modern day Faizabad), Oude, British India, located three miles from the river Ghogra (Ghaghara, locally known as Saryu) and 100 miles southeast of Lucknow. It was the seat of the largest weaving colony in the province, and manufactured both coarse cloth and fine muslin.
