= Ibrahim Danishmand =

16th-century zamindar and Islamic scholar

Malik al-Ulama, Qutb al-Ashiqeen Syed Ibrahim Danishmand

Personal life
- Died: Sonargaon
- Resting place: Dargabari Shahi Graveyard
- Children: Musa, Yusuf, Isa, Ishaq, Fatima
- Other name: Danishmand
- Relatives: Syed Muhammed Taifoor (descendant)

Religious life
- Religion: Islam
- Denomination: Sunni
- Jurisprudence: Hanafi
- Tariqa: Qadiri

Muslim leader
- Period in office: 16th century

Syed Ibrāhīm Dānishmand (Bengali: সৈয়দ ইব্রাহীম দানেশমন্দ, Persian: سید ابراهیم دانشمند) was a 16th-century zamindar and Islamic scholar who belonged to the Qadiriyya Sufi order. Well respected during his lifetime, Danishmand was considered an expert in several Islamic and secular subjects. He is believed to be among the first of the Qadiriyya order to have operated and preached in Bengal.

== Early life ==
Born into a Syed family, there are differing opinions on the exact origins of Danishmand, with one suggestion being that he was a native of Persia who migrated to Bengal in the 16th century. It may therefore be possible that he was among the many Syeds who were invited from Central Asia and Persia by the Sultan of Bengal, Alauddin Husain Shah, to aid in the administration of his kingdom.

Alternatively, historian Achyut Charan Choudhury states that he was a great-grandson of the Sufi general Syed Nasiruddin and belonged to the Syeds of Taraf, a land owning family who had had a presence in Bengal since the 13th century.

== Life ==
A prolific writer, Syed Ibrahim was learned in many areas of Islam, though he was particularly focused on tasawwuf (Islamic mysticism). For his knowledge he was styled Danishmand (wise), the title he is most commonly associated with. Under Danishmand’s guidance, the Hindu Rajput nobleman Kalidas Gazdani converted to Islam. Gazdani took the name Sulaiman Khan and later became the father of the famous Isa Khan, who led the Baro-Bhuyan in rebellion against the Mughal Empire.

Syed Ibrahim was also a noted scholar in the Persian and Arabic languages. He was recognised for these achievements by the Emperor of Delhi, from whom he received the title Malik al-Ulama (King of Scholars), and was also known by the honorific Qutb-ul-Ashiqeen (Pivot of Lovers). At some point, Danishmand was granted land tax-free in Sonargaon by the Sultan of Bengal, later transferring there from his previous holdings in Taraf in Greater Sylhet. Here, he established a khanqah from which he preached Islam. This practise was continued by his descendants as well as his spiritual successors.

He was buried in Sonargaon, near the 15th century Fath Shah's Mosque in a tomb complex he shares with several family members and other Islamic figures. It is considered a sacred site and is commonly visited by devotees.

== Family ==
Many sources state that Syed Ibrahim was married to the Sultan of Bengal's eldest daughter, whose name may have been Raushan Akhtar Banu. However, there is some disagreement about the exact identity of this sultan. Suggestions include the last Ilyas Shahi ruler Jalaluddin Fateh Shah, as well as Alauddin Husain Shah or his son Ghiyasuddin Mahmud Shah, both of the Hussain Shahi dynasty. Through this marriage Syed Ibrahim had four sons: Musa, Isa, Yusuf and Ishaq. He also had a daughter (or granddaughter) named Fatima Bibi, who later became the wife of Isa Khan and the probable mother to his son Musa Khan.

His descendants remained important zamindars in Sonargaon, and among them was the historian Syed Muhammed Taifoor.

== Bibliography ==
- Bhaduri, Reena (2001), Social Formation in Medieval Bengal, Bibhasa, ISBN 978-81-87337-11-9
- Choudhury, Achyut Charan (2000) [1910], Srihatter Itibritta: Purbangsho (in Bengali), Kolkata: Kotha
- Curley, David L.; Das, Rahul Peter (1999), Essays on middle Bengali literature, Firma KLM, ISBN 978-81-7102-085-0
- Huda, Shahnaz (2012), "Taifoor, Syed Muhammed", Banglapedia: National Encyclopedia of Bangladesh, Asiatic Society of Bangladesh
- Hussainy Chisti, Syed Hasan Imam (1999), "Arabic and Persian in Sylhet", in Sharif Uddin Ahmed (ed.), Sylhet: History and Heritage, Bangladesh Itihas Samiti, ISBN 978-984-31-0478-6
- Karim, Nurul (1954), S. Moinul Haq (ed.), "Role of 'Isa' Khan in the History of East Pakistan", Journal of the Pakistan Historical Society, Pakistan Historical Society
- Khan, Muazzam Hussain (2014), "Ibrahim Danishmand, Saiyid", Banglapedia: National Encyclopedia of Bangladesh (Second ed.), Asiatic Society of Bangladesh
- Rashid, M. Harunur (1997), Sonargaon-Panam: A Survey of Historical Monuments and Sites in Bangladesh, Asiatic Society of Bangladesh, ISBN 978-984-512-344-0
- Sarkar, Jagadish Narayan; Ray, Nisith Ranjan; Chakrabarty, Phanindranath (1991), Studies in cultural development of India: collection of essays in honour of Prof. Jagadish Narayan Sarkar, Punthi Pustak, ISBN 9788185094434
- Taifoor, Syed Muhammed (1965), Glimpses of Old Dhaka: a short historical narration of East Bengal and Aassam, S. M. Perwez
