= Mugra Para Union =

Mugda Para
- Union
- Location in Bangladesh
- Coordinates: 23.6343°N 90.5892°E
- Country: Narayanganj Bangladesh
- Division: Dhaka Division
- District: Narayanganj District
- Upazilas: Sonargaon Upazila

Area
  - Total: 7.8 km^{2} (3.0 sq mi)

Population (2011)
  - Total: 32,391
- Time zone: UTC+6 (BST)

Mugra Para is a union parishad, the smallest administrative body of Bangladesh, located in Sonargaon Upazila, Narayanganj District, Bangladesh. The total population is 24,115.
