= Kedar Ray =

- Maharaja of Bikrampur

Monarch of Bikrampur
- Reign: 1561–1603
- Coronation: 1561 (first)
- Predecessor: Position established (first)
- Successor: Chand Dev Ray; Position abolished
- Born: 1561; Bikrampur, Bengal Sultanate
- Died: 1603; Sripur
- Spouse: Unknown
- Issue: Chand Deb Ray; Sôrnomoyi Debi
- House: Baro Bhuyans
- Father: Jadob Deb Ray
- Mother: Unknown
- Religion: Hinduism (born); Shaktism (permanent)

Kedarnath Dev Ray (1561–1603 CE) was the Maharaja of Bikrampur, and among the most prominent of the Baro-Bhuyan in the Bengal region of the Indian subcontinent, he resisted Mughals till he was in power (before being defeated by mughal vassal of Amber, Man Singh I).

== Genealogy ==
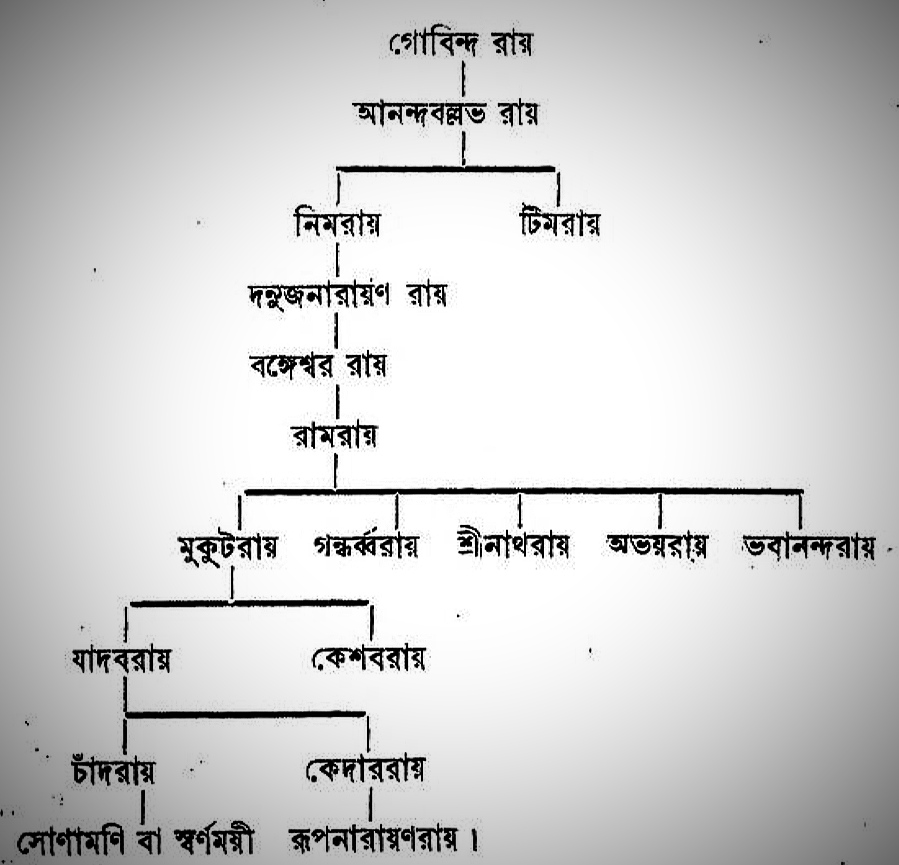
Family tree of Kedarnath Dev Ray of Sripur.

The genealogy of Kedar Ray has long been a subject of debate and confusion, particularly within the Bangaj Kayastha community. This historical ambiguity is often linked to a lack of concrete records in traditional sources like the 'Kul-Panji' or 'Ghatakkarika'—genealogical chronicles that document the lineage of certain Bengali families. The Ghataks (marriage brokers and genealogists) of Idilpur, who are known for their expertise in Bengali genealogy, have unfortunately not provided any detailed information regarding the Ray dynasty, especially about Kedar Ray.

=== Search for clarity in Ghatakkarika records ===
Attempts to uncover the lineage of Kedar Ray have met with limited success. Notably, Nagendranath Basu historian, the esteemed editor of 'Vishwakosh,' is said to possess a Ghatakkarika that might shed light on this matter. However, efforts to obtain this document have been unfruitful, leaving historians and genealogists to piece together the available information from other sources.

== Struggle and importance of Sandwip ==
=== Tripatite struggle of Sandwip ===
Sandwip, a strategically located island off the coast of Bengal, has a long history marked by struggle. Situated six leagues from the port of Sripur, Sandwip was naturally fortified by sea walls, making it difficult to access without prior knowledge of its terrain. This unique position made the island not only a hub for trade but also a coveted prize for various powers, including the Bengali rulers, the Mughals, the Portuguese, and other European colonial forces.

One of Sandwip's most valuable resources was its abundant production of salt, which played a crucial role in the economy of Bengal.The fame of its salt industry spread throughout the region, attracting the interest of many powerful forces who sought control over the island. As a result, Sandwip became a focal point in the larger geopolitical struggle for dominance in the region.

Among the most notable figures in Sandwip's history was Kedar Roy, a local leader who exhibited extraordinary bravery and military prowess in defending the island. His courage in safeguarding Sandwip from external threats, particularly the Portuguese and Mughal invaders, has earned him a special place in Bengal's history. Kedar Roy's unyielding defense of the island highlighted the importance of Sandwip not only as a trade hub but also as a symbol of regional pride and autonomy.

The Portuguese first arrived in India in 1528 AD, establishing trading posts in locations like Mangalore, Cochin, Ceylon, Goa, and Nagapattinam. By 1518 AD, Portuguese traders, such as John Silveria, had already begun to exert influence in regions like Bengal, further complicating the political landscape of the area. Sandwip, with its natural resources and strategic location, became a key battleground in the ensuing struggle for control between local rulers like Kedar Roy and foreign powers.

The history of Sandwip is intertwined with the larger narratives of Bengal, the Mughals, and the Portuguese. Its importance as a commercial center and its role in regional power dynamics make it an essential chapter in the history of Bengal. The island's rich legacy of resistance and economic importance continues to resonate in the broader historical context of South Asia.

== Portuguese influence in Bikrampur ==
During the 16th and 17th centuries, the Portuguese Empire exerted a significant influence along the coast of Bengal, including the region of Bikrampur. This influence was not limited to trade and diplomacy but extended to military alliances and strategic collaborations. One notable aspect of this influence was the alliance formed between the Portuguese and Maharaja Kedar Ray of Bikrampur.The Portuguese presence in Bikrampur was marked by their involvement in the local military efforts against the Mughal Empire, showcasing their crucial role in regional power dynamics.

=== Key figures ===
- Dominique Carvalho: Carvalho served as the Governor of Sandwip Island under Maharaja Kedar Ray of Bikrampur. His role was pivotal as he held the position of Chief of Artillery in the Bikrampur Army. Carvalho's leadership was instrumental during the fierce naval warfare against the Mughals over the control of Sandwip Island. His strategic acumen and military skills led to a decisive victory for the Bikrampur forces, resulting in the defeat of the Mughal forces and the death of the Mughal commander, Kilmaq Khan. Carvalho's contribution cemented his status as a key military leader in the region.
- Manoel de Mattos: Mattos was another prominent Portuguese commander who served as one of the Chief Commanders of the Bikrampur Army. His leadership was particularly notable in the Battle of Sripur in 1585, where he demonstrated remarkable military prowess. His aggressive tactics and bravery were so impactful that they induced fear in the Mughal commander Man Singh, who fled to Delhi to escape further confrontation. Mattos's actions highlighted the effectiveness of Portuguese military strategies in challenging the Mughal forces.

The collaboration between the Portuguese and the Bikrampur Kingdom under Maharaja Kedar Ray exemplifies the significant role the Portuguese played in the region's military and political landscape during this period. Their alliance not only influenced local power structures but also demonstrated their strategic importance in the broader context of regional conflicts.

== Rise to power ==
=== Arakan-Bikrampur naval battle ===
Arakanese King Selim Shah launched an invasion of the Bay of Bengal with 5,000 warships, aiming to dominate the region. Despite being outnumbered, Kedar Ray of Bikrampur, with only 1,000 ships, led his fleet to a decisive victory. Over 3,000 Arakanese ships were destroyed, forcing the invaders to retreat.

This victory not only ended Arakanese ambitions but also established the Bikrampur Kingdom as a dominant power in the Bay of Bengal, showcasing Kedar Ray's strategic brilliance.

=== Battle of Kalindi River ===
A few years after the rise of Bikrampur, the Mughal Emperor Akbar sought to conquer the kingdom and merge it into his empire. He sent his general, Manda Ray, to lead the invasion. The Mughal forces launched their attack on the banks of the Kalindi River, aiming to crush Bikrampur's defenses.

However, the Mughal army was met with fierce resistance from General Cavaldro, the military commander of Kedar Ray's Sripur Kingdom. In a decisive and bloody battle, Cavaldro's forces triumphed over the invading Mughal troops. Many historians recount that the waters of the Kalindi River ran red with the blood of the Mughal army, a symbol of their devastating defeat.

This victory further solidified Bikrampur's independence and marked a significant setback for the Mughal Empire's expansion in the region.

=== Battle of Srinagar ===
Following their defeat, the Mughals sought revenge. Their ally, Maharaja Man Singh of Jaipur, sent the Mughal general Kirmak Khan into battle against Kedar Ray. Aware of Kedar Ray's military expertise, Kirmak Khan avoided a direct assault on the Bikrampur capital and instead targeted the smaller city of Srinagar.

A fierce battle erupted between the Mughal forces and the Bikrampur army at Srinagar. Bikrampur's generals—Philip and Cavaldro—fought valiantly, leading their troops to a decisive victory. The Mughal army suffered a massive defeat, with Kirmak Khan taken prisoner and half of the Mughal forces fleeing the battlefield.

After the victory, the Bikrampur army laid siege to the Mughal camps and captured their cannons. This triumph allowed the Bikrampur Kingdom to advance into north West Bengal, seizing several territories and further expanding its influence.

=== Isah Khan-Bikrampur War ===
When the King Isa Khan broke off his alliance with Kedar Ray, tensions escalated. In response, Kedar Ray sent a force of twenty thousand Islamic soldiers from the Bikrampur army to attack Kalinga. The two armies clashed in a fierce battle, which ultimately ended in a decisive victory for Bikrampur. Isah Khan forces, unable to withstand the onslaught, retreated from the battlefield, marking another triumph for Kedar Ray and solidifying his dominance in the region.

== Fall of Bikrampur and career ==
=== Final battle: Man Singh of Amber's march on Bikrampur ===
The tension between the Mughal Empire and the Bikrampur Kingdom reached its breaking point when Emperor Jahangir sent a letter to Maharaja Kedar Ray, demanding the vassalization of the Sripur Kingdom under Mughal rule. Jahangir expected Kedar Ray to submit, but the letter only fueled the Maharaja's fury. Having built a powerful kingdom through military skill and wise governance, Kedar Ray refused to bow to the Mughals. He chose defiance, preparing for battle to defend his kingdom's sovereignty.

In response, Jahangir ordered his trusted vassal, Maharaja Man Singh of Amber, to lead the campaign against Bikrampur. Man Singh, an experienced commander and ruler, marched toward Bengal with a massive force: three hundred thousand Mughal troops, twenty thousand war elephants, ninety thousand cavalry, and fifteen thousand gunners. The sheer size of this army was meant to crush any resistance and send a clear message to all who would oppose Mughal authority.

Undeterred by the scale of the threat, Kedar Ray rallied his own forces. The Bikrampur army, numbering one hundred thousand troops, supported by ninety thousand war elephants, five thousand cavalry, and seventy thousand gunners, stood ready to face the Mughals. Although significantly outnumbered, Kedar Ray and his generals had a history of defying the odds, and this battle would be no different.

As Man Singh's army advanced, the two forces met in a brutal and epic confrontation. The battlefield shook with the thunder of charging elephants, the clash of steel, and the relentless roar of cannon fire. For nine days, the battle raged, with Kedar Ray himself leading his troops alongside his loyal generals, Philip and Cavaldro. Their leadership and bravery held the Mughal forces at bay, even as they were pushed to the brink.

But on the ninth day, a decisive and tragic event unfolded. Amidst the chaos of battle, a Mughal cannon shot struck Kedar Ray, mortally wounding him. The loss of their leader was a devastating blow to the Bikrampur army. Without Kedar Ray's unifying presence, the troops' morale began to falter, and the tide of the battle quickly shifted in favor of the Mughals.

Sensing their opportunity, the Mughal forces, led by Man Singh, launched a final, overwhelming assault. The Bikrampur army, already battered and leaderless, suffered heavy casualties. The Mughal army pressed forward, and soon the capital of Bikrampur was besieged. Despite their fierce resistance, the defenders could not hold out. After weeks of gruelling combat, the once-mighty Bikrampur Kingdom fell to the Mughals, marking the end of its independence.

The fall of Bikrampur was a significant victory for the Mughal Empire, but it also marked the end of a proud and resilient kingdom. Though Kedar Ray died on the battlefield, his legacy lived on through the stories of his courage and his refusal to submit. The descendants of Bikrampur still survive in India, carrying the memory of their ancestors' defiance and valor.

The battle between the Mughals and Bikrampur, led by Man Singh of Amber, remains a testament to the strength of smaller kingdoms in their struggle against the might of empires. While the kingdom ultimately fell, the story of Kedar Ray's resistance against overwhelming odds endures as a symbol of bravery and the will to fight for independence.
