= Syeda Momena Khatun =

Princess of the Sultanate of Bengal
- Born: 16th-century Sultanate of Bengal
- Died: 16th-century Sultanate of Bengal
- Spouses: Kalidas Gazdani
- Issue: Isa Khan; Ismail Khan
- House: Hussain Shahi
- Father: Ghiyasuddin Mahmud Shah
- Religion: Sunni Islam

Syeda Momena Khatun (Bengali: সৈয়দা মোমেনা খাতুন, Persian: سيدة مؤمنة خاتون, romanized: Sayyidah Muʾminah Khātūn) was a princess of the Sultanate of Bengal's Hussain Shahi dynasty. She was the mother of Isa Khan, the leader of the Baro-Bhuiyan confederacy.

== Biography ==
Khatun was born in the 16th century into a ruling class Bengali Sunni Muslim family known as the Hussain Shahi dynasty, in the Bengal Sultanate. Her father, Sultan Ghiyasuddin Mahmud Shah, was the son of Alauddin Husain Shah – the founder of the dynasty. Her sister was the wife of Khidr Khan Surak.

She married Sulaiman Khan né Kalidas Gazdani, who was her father's Dewan and the Zamindar of Sarail. According to historian Abdul Kader, Sulaiman had fallen in love with Khatun prior to their marriage. In Sarail, she gave birth to two sons; Isa Khan, who would later become the leader of the Baro-Bhuiyan confederacy after the fall of the Sultanate and resist the Mughal invasion of Bengal, and Ismail Khan. She also had a daughter who was popularly known as Shahinsha Bibi.

== See also ==
- History of Bengal
