= Bhati (region) =

Bhati was a large region of medieval Bengal, referred to by Abu'l-Fazl ibn Mubarak and by others until at least the 17th-century CE, during the period of the Mughal Empire. It was said to encompass the river delta area now lying within the borders of Bangladesh and often referred to as eastern Bengal. The area of Bhati supposedly included the low-lying areas of the greater districts of Dhaka, Mymensingh, Tippera (Comilla) and Sylhet in the days of Akbar and Jahangir, extending perhaps all the way to Sylhet.. However Abu’l Fazl in the Akbarnama seems to suggest that Bhati was in fact larger than Bengal itself and extended to Bihar. The fact that this conflicts and overlaps with virtually all of Bengal suggests that the Mughals had no clear idea of what the region of Bhati entailed, it was likely much smaller than claimed, and furthermore, not a cohesive region at all. In Bengali, the word refers to low lying lands downstream of any given river rather than a specific region, and thus would have, as it still does, referred to small pockets of land scattered throughout Bengal rather than a true region on its own.

== Geography ==
Bhati was one of the forested areas that the Mughals began to turn into arable land. The historian Richard Eaton says that:

A distinguishing feature of East Bengal during the Mughal period — that is, in "Bhati" — was its far greater agricultural productivity and population growth relative to contemporary West Bengal. Ultimately, this arose from the long-term eastward movement of Bengal's major river systems, which deposited the rich silt that made the cultivation of wet rice possible.

== Politics ==
At the end of the Karrani Dynasty (1564–1575), the nobles of Bengal Sultanate became fiercely independent. Sultan Sulaiman Khan Karrani carved out an independent principality in the Bhati region comprising a part of greater Dhaka district and parts of Mymensingh district. During that period Taj Khan Karrani and another Afghan chieftain helped Isa Khan to obtain an estate in Sonargaon and Mymensingh in 1564. By winning the grace of the Afghan chieftain, Isa Khan gradually increased his strength and status and by 1571, he had become the leader of the Baro-Bhuyans and a zamindar of Bhati region.

=== Rulers ===
- Isa Khan (r. 1576–1599)
- Musa Khan (r. 1599–1610)

=== Administrative divisions ===
There were 22 parganas (administrative units) under the rule of Isa Khan.

1. Atia
2. Kagmari
3. Barabaju
4. Sherpur (now Sherpur District)
5. Jayan Shahi
6. Alapsing
7. Mymensingh
8. Jafarshah
9. Nasirujiral
10. Khaliajury
11. Gangamandal
12. Paitkura
13. Bardakhat
14. Swarnagram (Now Sonargaon Upazila)
15. Baradakhat Mandra
16. Husainsahi
17. Bhawal
18. Maheswardi
19. Katrar
20. Kurikhai
21. Jour Husainpur
22. Singdha
23. Darjibaju
24. Hajradi
