= Baro-Bhuyan =

Medieval petty rulers of Assam and Bengal

The Baro-Bhuyans (also spelled as Baro-Bhuians and Baro Bhuiyans) were confederacies of soldier-landowners in Assam and Bengal in the late Middle Ages and the early modern period. The confederacies consisted of loosely independent entities, each led by a warrior chief or a landlord (Bhuiyan). The tradition of Baro-Bhuyan is peculiar to both Assam and Bengal and differs from the tradition of Bhuihar of Uttar Pradesh and Bihar—in Assam this phenomenon came into prominence in the 13th century when they resisted the invasion of Ghiyasuddin Iwaj Shah and in Bengal when they resisted Mughal rule in the 16th century.

Although the term baro denotes the number twelve in Bengali and Assamese languages, in general, there were more than twelve chiefs or landlords, and the word baro meant many. Thus, Bhuyan-raj denoted individual Bhuyanship, whereas Baro-Bhuyan denoted temporary confederacies that they formed. In times of aggression by external powers, they generally cooperated in defending and expelling the aggressor. In times of peace, they maintained their respective sovereignty. In the presence of a strong king, they offered their allegiance. In general, each of them was in control of a group of villages, called cakala, and the more powerful among them called themselves raja. The rulers of the Bhuyanships belonged to different ethnic, religious or social backgrounds.

In the 13th century Brahmaputra Valley, the system of Baro-Bhuyan Raj was formed from the petty chieftains—the remaining fragments of the erstwhile Kamarupa state. They often resisted foreign invasions (Ghiyasuddin Iwaj Shah in the 13th century), removed foreign rule (Hussain Shah in the 16th century) and sometimes usurped state power (Arimatta in the 14th century). They occupied the region west of the Kachari kingdom on the south bank of the Brahmaputra River, and west of the Chutiya kingdom on the north bank. These included areas of Nagaon, Darrang and Sonitpur districts. Subsequently, the Baro Bhuyan rule ended in the 16th century as they were squeezed between the Kachari kingdom and the Kamata kingdom in the west and were slowly overpowered by the expanding Ahom kingdom in the east.

In Bengal, the most prominent Baro Bhuiyan confederacy was led by Isa Khan of Sonargaon in the 16th century, which emerged during the disintegration of the Bengal Sultanate in the region, as a resistance to the Mughal expansion. They carved the land of Bhati and other areas of Bengal into twelve administrative units, or Dwadas Bangla. The Baro-Bhuyans gradually succumbed to the Mughal dominance and eventually lost control during the reign of emperor Jahangir, under the leadership of Islam Khan I, the governor of Bengal Subah.

== Baro-Bhuyans of Assam ==
Baro-Bhuyans of Assam অসমৰ বাৰ-ভূঞা
- c. 13th–16th centuries
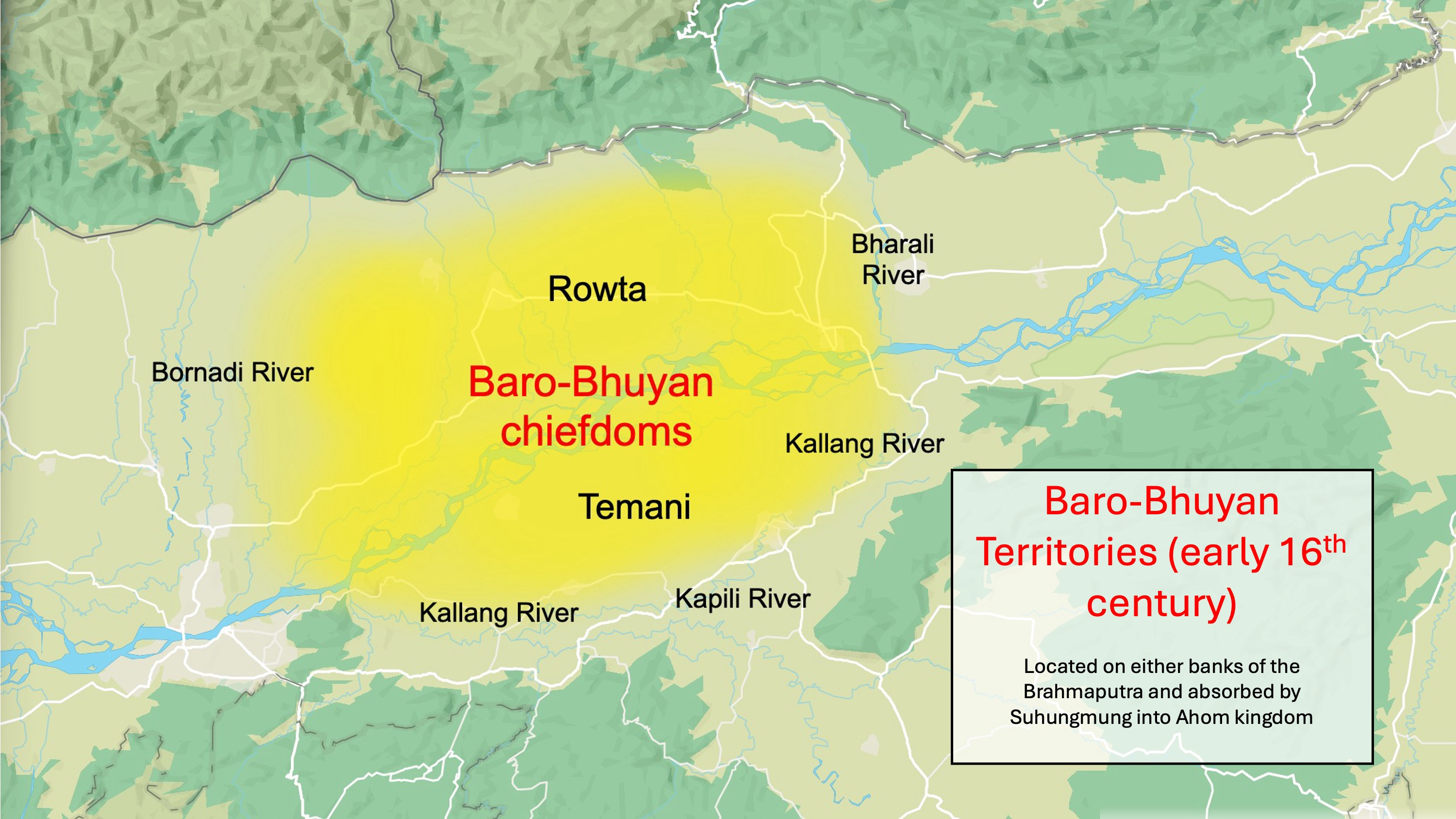
- Territorial extent of Baro-Bhuyans of Central Assam, whose territories were annexed by Suhungmung in the early 16th century. The Bhuyans of the Lower Assam region were suppressed by the Koch king Biswa Singha in the same period
- Status: Military confederacy
- Common languages: Assamese; Sanskrit
- Religion: Hinduism; Islam; Buddhism; Christianity and others
- Government: Federal chieftaincy
- Shiromani
- Historical era: Early modern
  - Adi Baro-Bhuyans: c. 13th–15th centuries
  - Later Baro-Bhuyans: c. 14th–16th centuries
Preceded by
Kamrupa
Bengal Sultanate
Kachari Kingdom
Chutiya Kingdom
Kamata Kingdom
Succeeded by
Ahom Kingdom
- Today part of: India; Bangladesh; Bhutan

Epigraphic sources indicate that the Kamarupa state had entered a state of fragmentation in the 9th century when the tradition of granting away police, revenue and administrative rights to the donee of lands became common. This led to the creation of a class of landed intermediaries between the king and his subjects—the members of which held central administrative offices, maintained economic and administrative links within their own domain and propagated Indo-Aryan culture. This gave rise to the condition that individual domains were self-administered, economically self-sufficient and capable of surviving the fragmentation of central authority, when the Kamarupa kingdom finally collapsed in the 12th century.

Amalendu Guha claims that the Baro-Bhuyan emerged in the 13th century from the fragmented remains of the Kamarupa chieftains. Nevertheless, not all local Kamarupa administrators (samanta) became Bhuyans, and many were later-day migrant adventurers from North India. Though there exist many legendary accounts of the origin of the Baro Bhuyan, these accounts are often vague and contradictory.

=== The Adi Bhuyan group ===
This original group is often referred to as the Adi Bhuyan, or the progenitor Bhuyans. The Adi-charita written in the late 17th century is the only manuscript that mentions the Adi-Bhuyan group. However, Maheswar Neog has called the account spurious or fabricated.

Nevertheless, their presence is recorded in the Ahom Buranjis, where it is recorded that they were instrumental in ending the rule of the Kachari kingdom. As a reward, the Ahom king Suhungmung (1497–1539) settled these Bhuyans (originally living in Rowta-Temoni, present-day Darrang and Nagaon) in Kalabari, Gohpur, Kalangpur and Narayanpur as tributary feudal lords. Over time, these Bhuyans grew very powerful, but they were later subjugated by the Ahom king Jayadhwaj Singha. The Saru Baro Bhuyan is a branch of the Bar Baro Bhuyan that split and went west.

By the mid-16th century, all the Adi Bhuyans power was crushed, and they remained satisfied with what service they could render to the Ahom state as Baruwas or Phukans, Tamulis or Pachanis. During the first expedition of Chilarai against the Ahom kingdom, they aligned with the Ahoms (which Chilarai lost), but during the second expedition, they aligned with the Koches (which Chilarai won). Chilarai appointed Uzir Bamun, Tapashi Laskar and Malamulya Laskar as Rajkhowas in Uttarkula after he annexed the territories up to the Subansiri River in 1563 AD. This group was finally subjugated by Prataap Singha in 1623, who relocated them to the south bank of the Brahmaputra. The Saru Bhuyans, who had moved west after the conflict with the Bor Baro-Bhuyans, trace the genealogy of Candivara to Kanvajara, the eldest son of Sumanta, but this is not given credence.

=== Later group ===
The later Baro-Bhuyans had ensconced themselves between the Kachari kingdom in the east and the Kamata kingdom in the west on the south bank of the Brahmaputra River. According to Neog, the leader (shiromani) of the group, Chandivara, was originally a ruler of Kannauj, who may have had to flee due to Firuz Shah Tughlaq's 1353 campaign against Shamsuddin Ilyas Shah and reached Gauda, the domain of Dharmanarayana. As a result of a treaty between Dharmanarayana and Durlabhnarayana of the Kamata kingdom, a group of seven Kayastha and seven Brahmin families led by Candivara was transferred to Langamaguri, a few miles north of present-day Guwahati.

During the harvesting season in Lengamaguri, the Bhutiyas attacked and looted the country, and in one instance the Bhutiyas captured Rajadhara, the son of Candivara. Candivara chased the Bhutiyas as far as Daimara between Maguri (near Changsari town) and Dewangiri (in Bhutan), killed a few of them, and released his son from captivity. In the next four or five years, the people of Lengamaguri, finding that Bhutiyas were planning an attack in retaliation, decided to hand over Candivara as the person responsible for the massacre of the Bhutiyas. The Bhutiyas chased Candivara as far as Rauta (in present-day Udalguri district) but had to suffer defeat at the hands of the Baro-Bhuyans. Candivara and his group, in search of a safe haven, did not stay in Lengamaguri for long and moved soon to Bordowa in present-day Nagaon district with the support of Durlabhnarayana. Among the descendants of Candivara was Srimanta Sankardeva.

After the death of Candivara, Rajadhara became the Baro-Bhuyan. A second group of five Bhuyans joined the Candivara group later. In due course, members of these Bhuyans became powerful. Alauddin Husain Shah, who ended the Khen dynasty by displacing Nilambar in 1498, extended his rule up to the Barnadi River by defeating Harup Narayan, who was a descendant of Gandharva-raya, a Bhuyan from the second group established by Durlabhnarayana at Bausi (Chota raja of Bausi), among others. The Baro-Bhuyans retaliated and were instrumental in ending the rule of Alauddin Husain Shah via his son Shahzada Danyal. But very soon, the rise of Biswa Singha of the Koch dynasty in Kamata destroyed their hold in Kamrup and squeezed those in the Nagaon region against the Kacharis to their east. They had to relocate to the north bank of the Brahmaputra in the first quarter of the 16th century, to a region west of the Bor Baro-Bhuyan group. The increasing Koch and Ahom conflicts further ate away at their independence and sovereignty.

== Baro Bhuiyans of Bengal ==
Baro Bhuiyans of Bengal বাংলার বারো ভূইঁয়া
- 1576–1610
- Status: Military confederacy
- Capital: Sonargaon
- Common languages: Bengali; Persian; Sanskrit
- Religion: Hinduism; Islam; Buddhism; Christianity and others
- Government: Federal chieftaincy
- Leaders
  - 1576–1599: Isa Khan
  - 1599–1610: Musa Khan
- Historical era: Early modern
  - Battle of Raj Mahal: 12 July 1576
  - Surrender of Musa Khan: 10 July 1610
- Currency: Tanka
Preceded by	Succeeded by
Bengal Sultanate	Mughal Empire
- Today part of: Bangladesh; India

At the end of the Karrani Dynasty (1564–1575), the nobles of Bengal became fiercely independent. Sulaiman Khan Karrani carved out an independent principality in the Bhati region comprising a part of greater Dhaka district and parts of Mymensingh district. During that period Taj Khan Karrani and another Afghan chieftain helped Isa Khan to obtain an estate in Sonargaon and Mymensingh in 1564. By winning the grace of the Afghan chieftain, Isa Khan gradually increased his strength and status, and by 1571, he had become the ruler of Bhati.

=== Bhati region ===
Mughal histories, mainly the Akbarnama, the Ain-i-Akbari and the Baharistan-i-Ghaibi, refer to the low-lying regions of Bengal as Bhati.

This region includes the Bhagirathi to the Meghna River is Bhati, while others include Hijli, Jessore, Chandradwip and Barisal Division in Bhati. Keeping in view the theatre of warfare between the Baro-Bhuiyans and the Mughals, the Baharistan-i-Ghaibi mentions the limits of the area bounded by the Ichamati River in the west, the Ganges in the south, the Tripura to the east, Alapsingh pargana (in present Mymensingh District) and Baniachang (in greater Sylhet) in the north. The Baro-Bhuiyans rose to power in this region and put up resistance to the Mughals until Islam Khan Chisti made them submit in the reign of Jahangir.

=== Isa Khan ===
Isa Khan was the leader of the Baro Bhuiyans (twelve landlords) and a zamindar of the Bhati region in medieval Bengal. Throughout his reign, he resisted the Mughal Empire invasion. It was only after his death that the region went totally under the Mughal emperors.

The Jesuit mission that was sent to Bengal managed to identify that 3 of the chieftains were Hindus; they were Kandarpa Narayan Basu of Chandradwip, Bakla (Barisal), Kedar Ray of Bikrampur, and Pratapaditya of Jessore, while the rest were Muslims during Isa Khan's rule. Nalini Kanta Bhattasali affirms that there were more than twelve Bhuiyans, with the word baro signifying a large number.

== Notable persons ==
1. Musa Khan of Sonargaon; inheritor of Isa Khan
2. Khwaja Usman of Bokainagar, Mymensingh and later Uhar, Sylhet
3. Bayazid of Sylhet
4. Majlis Qutb of Fatehabad
5. Pitambar and Ananta of Chila-Jowar, Rajshahi
6. Kedar Ray of Bikrampur
7. Bahadur Khan of Hijli
8. Pratapaditya of Jessore
9. Surendranath Sur of Khardah
10. Bir Hambir of Bishnupur
11. Bhavashankari of Bhurishrestha, and later Hoogly
12. Fazal Gazi of Bhawal
13. Masul Khan Kabuli of Chatmohar
14. Binod Ray of Chandpratap
15. Pahlwan of Matang
16. Anwar Khan of Baniachong
