= Battles of the Mughal Empire =

Battles raged throughout the period of the Mughal Empire. Like many Central Asian armies, the Mughal army of Babur was horse-oriented. The ranks and pay of the officers were based on the horses they retained. Babur's army was small and inherited the Timurid military traditions of Central Asia. Babur did not introduce a gunpowder warfare system, instead relying on mounted archery. Babur's empire did not last long and the Mughal Empire collapsed with the expulsion of Humayun. The Mughal Empire founded by Akbar in 1556 proved more stable and enduring. Although the Mughals originated as a nomadic civilization, they grew more sedentary.

The armies of the Mughals were known for their high level of discipline and diverse personnel. They had absorbed almost all of Northern and Central South Asia. During the height of their military domination, their adversaries rarely fought frontal battles; the Maratha confederation, Ahmadnagar Sultanates, or the Rajput kingdoms were generally powerless against the Mughals ' cities and camps. They usually resorted to guerilla warfare or the Fabian strategy. By the time of Aurangzeb's reign the army still remained heavily diverse composed of Turanis (Central Asians), Persians, Afghans, and native Indians.

== Babur to Humayun era ==
In 1520, Babur raided western Punjab and subdued Lahore by 1524. He laid the foundation of the army during the First Battle of Panipat, where he employed Tulugma, encircling Ibrahim Lodi's army and forced it to face direct artillery fire, terrifying its war elephants. He achieved his final subjugation of the Rajputs in the Battle of Chanderi. In 1527, Babur again used muskets at Khanwa, where he defeated the alliance of Rana Sangram Singh of Mewar and other local rulers, and in 1529 won the Battle of Ghaghra against the remnants of the Afghan resistance.

The reign of Babur's successor Humayun was characterized by conflicts with the Sur Empire under Sher Shah Suri. After securing his throne, Humayun neutralized the threat of Ahmed Shah and annexed Gujarat, Malwa, Champaner, and the great fort of Mandu. Sher Shah, who at first remained in Agra and observed the Mughal military organization and administration, recorded how the Mughal empire military functioned. In conversation with his friend, Sher Shah remarked:

If luck and fortune favor me I will very shortly expel the Mughals from Hind, for the Mughals are not superior to the Afghans in battle or single combat, but the Afghans have let the Empire of Hindo slip from their hands on account of their internal dissensions. Since I have been amongst the Mughals, and know their conduct in action, I see that they have no order or discipline and that their kings from pride of birth and station do not personally superintend the government and leave all the affair and business of the state to their nobles and ministers, in whose sayings and doings they put perfect confidence. These grandees act on corrupt motives in every case whether it be of a soldier or a cultivator, or of a rebellious zamindar.

In 1535, Humayun became aware that the sultan of Gujarat was planning an assault on Mughal territories in Bayana with Portuguese aid. Humayun gathered an army and marched on Bahadur. However, instead of pressing his attack, Humayun ceased the campaign and consolidated, as Sultan Bahadur escaped and took up refuge with the Portuguese. Shortly after Humayun had marched on Gujarat, Sher Shah Suri saw an opportunity to wrest control of Agra from the Mughals . Humayun, faced with the rising threat of the Afghans in the east led by Mahmud Lodi, defeated their force at Dadrah in 1532, and besieged Chunar in September that year, then under Sher Shah's control. The siege continued for over four months to no avail. Sher Shah offered his loyalty to the Mughals on the condition that he remained in control of Chunar, and sent one of his sons as a hostage. Humayun accepted, lifting the siege in December 1532 and returning to Agra due to the rising threat of Bahadur Shah, the ruler of the Gujarat Sultanate. He refused to split his army, believing it would split his strength.

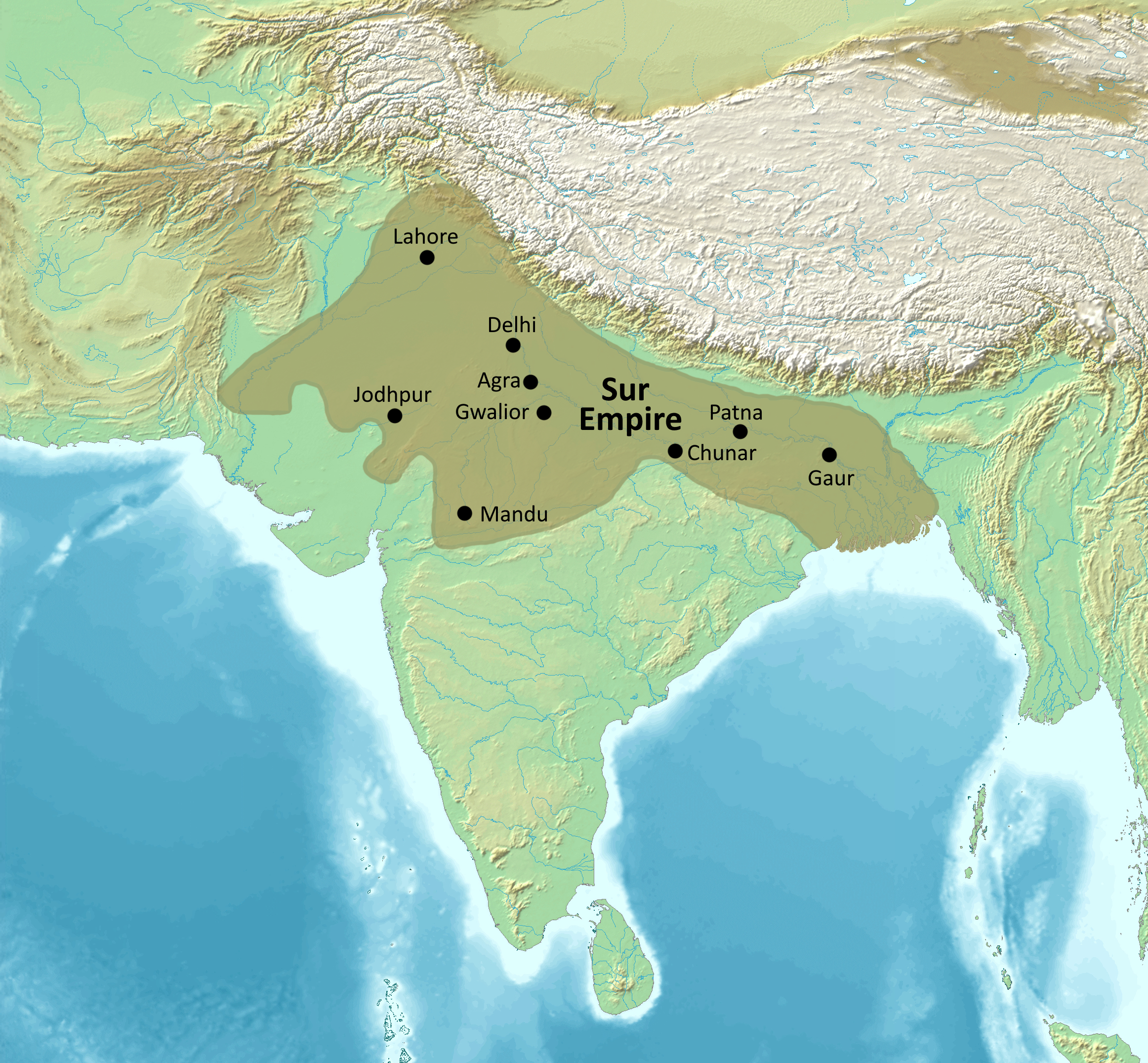
Map of the Sur Empire at its greatest extent under Sher Shah Suri (1538/1540–1545).

Sher Shah's hostility towards Bengal Sultanate prompted its ruler to request aid from Humayun, who in turn mobilized a Mughal army in July 1537, and advanced to Chunar. Humayun reached the fort in November 1537 and laid siege. The siege continued over six months until the fort fell, despite attempts from Rumi Khan to conquer the city. Sher Shah then led a second invasion into Bengal, seizing Rohtasgarh in March 1538, which he used to situate Afghan families and keep loot from the war. Sher Shah followed his victory at Rohtasgarh by besieging Gauda, which fell to Afghan forces in April 1538. With these victories, Sher Shah held his first coronation. Humayun refused to leave Bengal in the hands of a hostile state. Therefore, he began a march to Bengal against Sher Shah, but the march lost to poor weather conditions, with rains causing the loss of his baggage between Patna and Monghyr. Humayun eventually reached Gauda and seized it without opposition on 8 September 1538. Humayun remained at Gaur for months, stuck there due to the weather, as he restored order in the city.

At the same time, Sher Shah drove deep into his territory, seizing Bihar and Varanasi, while also recovering Chunar, and laying siege to Jaunpur with other detachments of the Afghan army, extending as far as Kannauj.

On June 26, 1539, Humayun fielded an army of 200,000 to face Sher Shah. Humayun crossed the Karmanasa River, where he was vulnerable to the Afghans. Sher Shah, seeing the fragile state, attacked the force led by Humayun at the Battle of Chausa. The Afghans surprised and routed the Mughals . Humayun escaped with his life, and the Mughals suffered over 7,000 dead, including many prominent noblemen.

Following his defeat, Humayun returned to Agra, and restored order after disturbances by his brother, Hindal Mirza. Humayun then mobilized a large force, and advanced with an army of 40,000, while Sher Shah amassed 15,000. Humayun met Sher Shah at Kannauj, with their armies mirroring each other across the Ganges river. Humayun crossed the river and began skirmishing. Amidst the fighting, many nobles hid their insignia to prevent them from being recognized, while many fled the battle. The Mughal army was defeated, and Humayun fled to Sindh. Following this victory, Sher Shah was crowned a second time on 17 May 1540 as Sher Shah, Emperor of Northern India.

After Sher Shah Suri's successor Islam Shah died in 1554, Humayun gathered a vast army with the help of Safavids. The vast majority of the army was Shi'a faith. Shaikh Ahmad described to Humayun, "My king, I see the whole of your army are Rafizi...Everywhere the names of your soldiers are of this kind. I find they are all Yar Ali or Kashfi Ali or Haider Ali and I have, not found a single man bearing the names of the other Companions."

Humayun placed the army under Bairam Khan, who led the army through the Punjab virtually unopposed. His only major battle came against Sikandar Shah Suri in Sirhind, where Bairam Khan engaged his enemy in open battle, but then quickly retreated in apparent fear. When the enemy followed, they were surprised by entrenched defensive positions and were annihilated. At the Battle of Sirhind on 22 June 1555, Sikandar Shah Suri's armies were decisively defeated and the Mughal Empire was reestablished. After Sirhind, most towns and villages welcomed the invading army as it rode to the capital. On 23 July 1555, Humayun once again sat on Babur's throne in Delhi.

== Akbar era ==
During the last stage of the conflict against Sur Empire, Akbar faced Hemu, a minister and general of one of the Sur rulers, who had proclaimed himself Hindu emperor and expelled the Mughals from the Indo-Gangetic Plains. Urged by Bairam Khan, who re-marshalled the Mughal army before Hemu could consolidate his position, Akbar marched on Delhi to reclaim it. His army, led by Bairam Khan, defeated Hemu and the Sur army on 5 November 1556 at the Second Battle of Panipat, 50 miles (80 km) north of Delhi. Soon after, Mughal forces occupied Delhi and then Agra. Akbar made a triumphant entry into Delhi, staying for one month. He and Bairam Khan then returned to Punjab to deal with Sikandar Shah Suri, who had again become active. In the next six months, the Mughals won another major battle against Sikander, who fled east to Bengal. Akbar and his forces occupied Lahore and seized Multan in the Punjab.

From 1556 to 1558, the Mughals conquered the city of Ajmer, the aperture to Rajputana, after the defeat and flight of its Muslim ruler. The city became the capital of Ajmer Subah who used it as a base for campaigns against Rajput rulers and, as the site of celebration when a campaign bore success. In the same year, the Mughals besieged and defeated the Sur forces in control of Gwalior Fort, a stronghold north of the Narmada river.

By 1559, the Mughals drove into Rajputana and Malwa Sultanate. However, Akbar's disputes with his regent, Bairam Khan, temporarily halted the expansion. Akbar dismissed Bairam Khan following a dispute at court in 1560 and ordered him to undertake the Hajj. He was defeated by the Mughal army in the Punjab. Akbar gave him the option of either continuing in his court or resuming his pilgrimage; Bairam chose the latter.

In 1560, Akbar resumed military operations. A Mughal army under the command of his foster brother, Adham Khan, and a Mughal commander, Pir Muhammad Khan, began the conquest of Malwa. The Afghan ruler, Baz Bahadur, was defeated at the Battle of Sarangpur and fled to Khandesh, leaving behind his harem, treasure, and war elephants. Despite initial success, Akbar was ultimately displeased with the aftermath; his foster brother retained the spoils and followed the Central Asian practice of slaughtering the surrendered garrison, their wives and children, including many Muslim theologians and Sayyids, who were descendants of Muhammad.

In 1564, Mughal forces began the conquest of Garha, a thinly populated, hilly area in central India that was of interest for its wild elephants. Akbar did not personally lead the campaign because he was preoccupied with the Uzbek rebellion, putting the campaign in the hands of Asaf Khan, the Mughal governor of Kara. Durgavati committed suicide after her defeat at the Battle of Damoh, while Raja Vir Narayan was slain at the Fall of Chauragarh, the mountain fortress of the Gonds. The Mughals seized immense wealth, including gold and silver, jewels, and 1,000 elephants. Kamala Devi, a younger sister of Durgavati, was sent to the Mughal harem.

In 1568, Akbar besieged Ranthambore Fort, a Hada Rajput stronghold in Rajasthan led by Rao Surjan Hada. After conquering Chittorgarh, Akbar aimed to solidify his rule of eastern Rajasthan. Employing cannon and tunneling, the Mughals overwhelmed the defenses, leading to Surjan Hada's surrender in March 1568. He swore allegiance to Akbar, joining the Mughal court as a noble.

In 1570, a deviant Sufism movement preaching Wahdat al-Wujud grew in Peshawar, founded by their charismatic leader Pir Roshan. The Roshani movement played an important part in politically in resisting the increasing influence of Mughals in the Afghan region as they gained popular support. Pir Roshan spent his life in conflict with the Mughals . His successors continued his struggle, capturing Ghazni city, prompting then emperor Jahangir to address the rebellion. After constant battles, the movement eventually weakened and ended.

In 1572, the Mughals annexed Gujarat and acquired its first access to the sea. Local officials informed Akbar that the Portuguese had begun to exert control in the Indian Ocean. Akbar obtained a cartaz (permit) from the Portuguese to sail in the Persian Gulf region. At the initial meeting of the Mughals and the Portuguese during the Siege of Surat, the Portuguese, recognising the superior strength, chose to pursue diplomacy. The Portuguese Governor, upon the request of Akbar, sent an ambassador to establish friendly relations. Next year at the close of 1573, Akbar sent an armed forces under Abdul Rahim Khan-I-Khana to pacify the rebellion in Gujarat. The rebels under viceroy Muzaffar soundly defeated and fled to Cambay (Khambhat), as Abdúr-Rahím Khán had been joined by Naurang Khán and other nobles with the Mughal army from Málwa, Thus prompting Muzaffar to fled to Rajpipla. As the conquest of Gujarát was completed in 1573, Akbar returned to Agra with the last Gujarat Sultán Muzaffar Shah III as a captive.

In 1575–1576, the Mughal general Mu'nim Kha ln successfully annexed the ports of l'ipli and Satgaon in Bengal, allowing the creation of the Mughal sulu (province) of Bengal.

In 1576, the Mughal army led by Man Singh I fought the Rajput kingdom of Mewar in the Battle of Haldighati. In this battle, the Mughal infantry routed the Mewar's war elephants.

By the end of 1577, as Wazír Khán's management was not successful, Shaháb-ud-dín Áhmed Khán was made viceroy. The governor of Malwa. Shaháb-ud-dín's first step was to create new military posts and strengthen the existing posts.

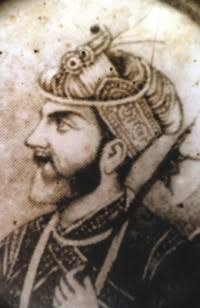
Depiction of Isa Khan, Chief of Baro-Bhuiyans of Bengal who fought Mughal empire from 1578 to 1597.

From 1578, the Mughals engaged in prolonged conflict against local Bengal warlord Isa Khan, which continued until 1597. Isa Khan was previously an ally of Mughal enemy, the Karrani dynasty, which helped Isa Khan in his expedition to Chittagong against Udai Manikya, the Maharaja of Tripura.

In 1583, Mughal General Shahbaz Khan Kamboh razed the palace of Isa Khan. In September 1584, the then-subahdar Shahbaz crossed the Ganges near Khizirpur and attacked Sonargaon, Katrabo and Egarasindhur and pursued the defeated Pathan forces under Masum Kabuli up to Bikrampur in Dhaka. Isa Khan avoided surrender and delayed the Mughal attack for several months. However, in 1584, Isa and Masum Khan Kabuli, deploying musket and gunpowder artilleries, launched a counterattack that defeated Shahbaz Khan in the naval and land battles of Egarasindur and Bhawal, and killed one of the Mughal generals, forcing Shahbaz Khan to retreat into Tandah.

In late 1585, Emperor Akbar sent military expedition under Zain Khan Koka and Birbal to pacify the rebellion of Afghani tribes.

In February 1586 the Mughal suffered heavy losses in the Battle of the Malandari Pass near the Karakar Pass between Swat and Buner. The Afghan tribe confederacy under Kalu Khan Yousafzai inflicted 8,000-40,000 casualties on the Mughal forces, and their commander, Birbal, was slain in battle. Akbar learned about the disaster 2 days after the battle, and dispatched an army under Rajah Todar Mal on 19 February to exact retribution, killing a large number of Yusufzais and selling many survivors as slaves to Turan and Persia. In the same year, Mughal general Man Singh defeated Isa Khan in the battle of Egarasindhur. Mughal Subahdar Shahbaz Khan again sent his forces against Isa to the south.

In 1591, Akbar faced another rebellion in Gujarat, where he faced the alliance of the Gujarat Sultanate, Nawanagar State, Cutch State, and Muli State. Akbar then sent Mirza Aziz Koka to engage them in the Battle of Bhuchar Mori. Mughal forces defeated the allied force, and Mirza Aziz plundered Nawanangar. He sent an army to conquer lower Sindh from the Tarkhan dynasty. Jani Beg put up resistance but was defeated and his principality was annexed.

In 1593, the Mughals annexed the Tarkhan dynasty after defeating the last Tarkhan ruler, Mirza Jani Beg; Jani Beg and his son Mirza Ghazi Beg continued to rule as Governors.

In 1594, Jahangir was dispatched by his father Akbar, alongside Asaf Khan, also known as Mirza Jafar Beg and Abu'l-Fazl ibn Mubarak, to defeat the renegade Raja Vir Singh Deo Bundela and to capture the city of Orchha, which was considered the centre of the revolt. Jahangir arrived with a force of 12,000 after many encounters. He subdued the Bundela and ordered Vir Singh Deo to surrender. After tremendous casualties and the start of negotiations between the two, Vir Singh Deo handed over 5000 Bundela infantry and 1000 cavalry. He feared Mughal retaliation and remained a fugitive until his death. The victorious Jahangir, at 26 years old, ordered the completion of the Jahangir Mahal, a famous Mughal citadel in Orchha, to commemorate his victory.

In August 1597 the Mughals engaged Isa Khan and his ally, Masum Khan Kabuli, in the final battle of their long conflict. At first Isa faced defeat with the Mughals attacking Katrabo, one of Isa's pargana (administrative unit). However, on 5 September, Durjan Singh was killed and the Mughal forces were defeated. Both the army and navy of the Mughal-Koch Bihar alliance were either routed or captured. After the battle, Akbar put 22 parganas administrative units under his control.

== Jahangir to Shah Jahan era ==
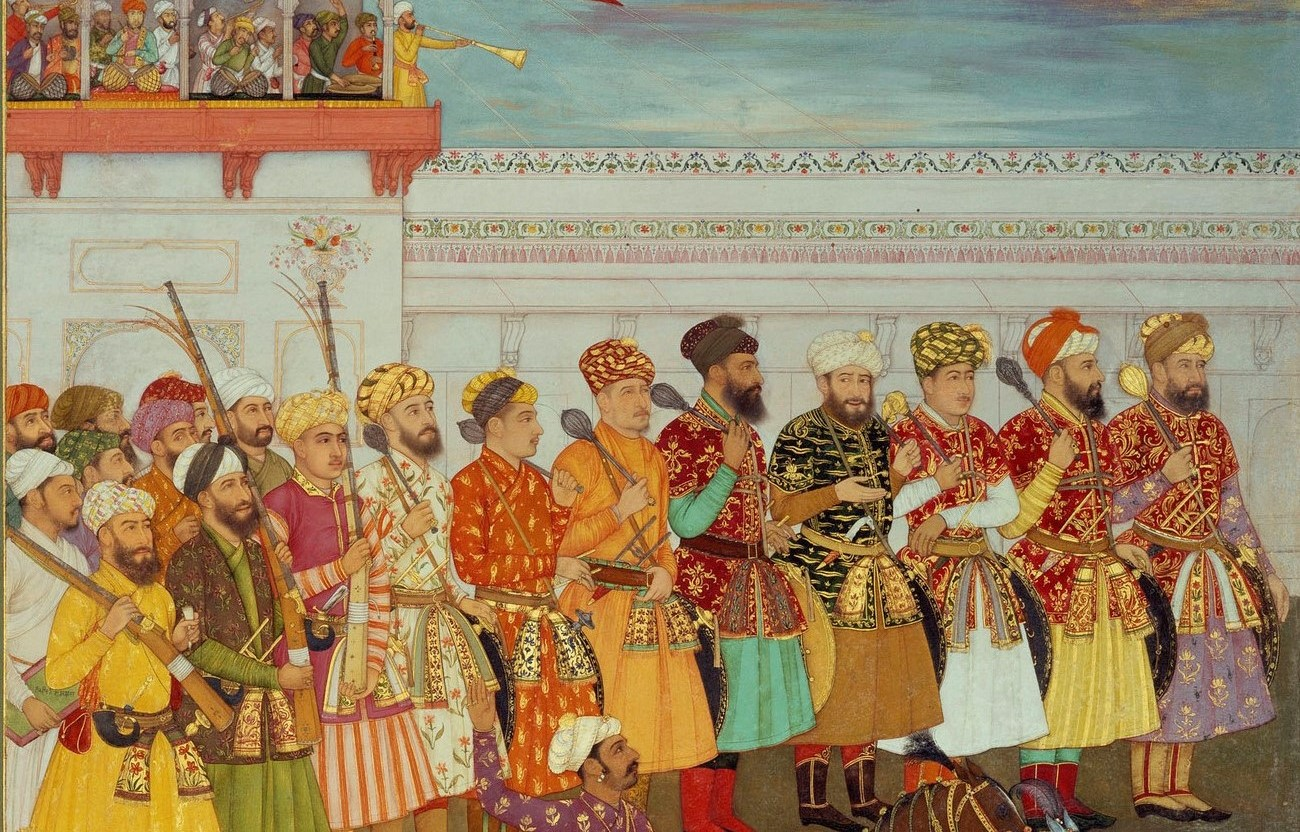
Man Singh I Imperial court guards of Shah Jahan

From 1602 to 1604, Man Singh I established a Mughal coastal navy with assistance from Portuguese pirates. He successfully repelled the Mrauk U kingdom's amphibious invasion into Bengal Subah. In 1609 and 1612, Cooch Behar and Kamrup were subsequently annexed by the Mughals .

In 1608, Jahangir sent Islam Khan I to subdue the rebellious son of Isa Khan, Musa Khan, the Masnad-e-Ala of the Baro-Bhuyan confederacy in Bengal. Islam Khan manage to subdue and imprisoned Musa Khan.

In 1612 the Mughals invaded the Greater Sylhet region. Bayazid Karrani II, a member of the Karrani dynasty of Bengal, was among the most powerful leaders of the Eastern Afghani Confederates, independently ruling its eastern half with his capital in Pratapgarh. He continued the struggle against Mughal expansion of the previous generation under Isa Khan. Bayazid had been granted lands as part of the maintenance of this alliance by Musa Khan. Bayazid allied with Khwaja Usman from Usmangarh (and Taraf) and Anwar Khan of Baniachong. This alliance led Islam Khan I, the Mughal governor of Bengal to dispatch an imperial force against Bayazid. Ghiyas Khan was initially appointed to lead the expedition, although command was later entrusted to Shaikh Kamal. He was assisted by officers such as Mubariz Khan, Tuqmaq Khan, Mirak Bahadur Jalair and Mir Abdur Razzaq Shirazi. Mir Ali Beg was made the bakhshi (paymaster) of this Mughal command. The host consisted of four thousand matchlock-men, one thousand cavalry of Islam Khan I, one hundred imperial war elephants and the fleet of Musa Khan and his confederates, who had surrendered to the Mughals the previous year. Bayazid's side consisted of the forces sworn to him and his brother Yaqub, as well as several hill-tribe chieftains (likely Kukis). The conflict raged until Khwaja Usman was slain. His death demoralized the Afghan, prompting Bayazid to surrender. Soon after, Anwar Khan also submitted, thus bringing Sylhet for the first time under Mughal control.

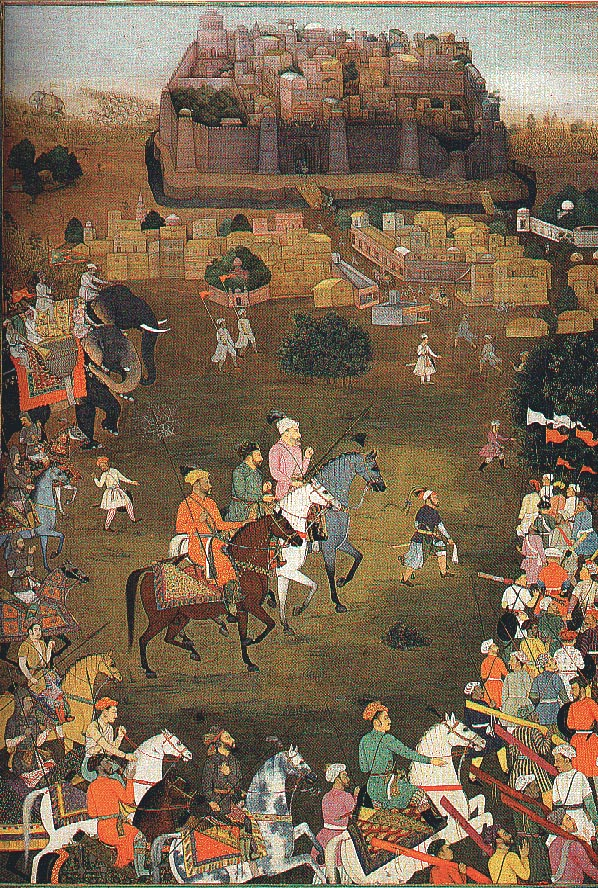
The Mughal Army under the command of prince Aurangzeb depicted in Siege of Daulatabad (1633).

In 1613, Jahangir imposed a draconian law to extirpate the Koli peoples, who were notorious robbers and plunderers living in the most inaccessible parts of Gujarat. Many Koli chieftains were massacred and the rest were hunted into the mountains and deserts. 169 heads of Koli chiefs were killed in battle by Nur-ul-llah Ibrahim, commander of ollodo. In the same year, after the Portuguese seized the Mughal ship Rahimi, which had set out from Surat with a cargo of 100,000 rupees and Pilgrims on the Hajj. The Portuguese officially refused to return the ship and its passengers, Jahangir and his court were outraged and ordered the seizure of the Portuguese town Daman. He ordered the apprehension of all Portuguese within the Mughal Empire; he further confiscated Jesuits churches. Due to this conflict, trading activities of the Portuguese ended, while the British gained favor.

In response to the Portuguese seizure, Mughal forces, led by Khwaja Jahan, launched a combined land and naval campaign in early 1614 against Portuguese outposts in Surat and Cambay. Capitalizing on their numerical strength and control over Gujarat, the Mughals besieged fortifications, disrupted trade routes, and captured goods and personnel, using local garrisons and coastal vessels to blockade Portuguese supply lines. By mid-1615, the Portuguese surrendered, releasing the Rahimi's passengers and cargo and accepting Mughal trade terms, solidifying Mughal authority along the Gujarat coast and further reducing Portuguese influence.

Later, after a year-long war of attrition in the same year, Rana Amar Singh I surrendered conditionally to the Mughal forces and became a vassal state of the Mughals as a result of Mughal expedition of Mewar. In 1615, Khurram presented Kunwar Karan Singh, Amar Singh's heir to Jahangir. Khurram was sent to pay homage to his mother and stepmothers and was later rewarded by Jahangir. His mansab was increased from 12,000/6,000 to 15,000/7,000, practically making his rank equal with his brother Parvez. It was further increased to 20000/10000 in 1616.

Between 1614 and 1616, Mughal Subahdar of Bengal Qasim Khan Chishti faced a combined attack of Arakanese and Portuguese forces. Because of a rift between these forces, Qasim Khan thwarted the expedition. In February 1616, Qasim Khan built an army and sent an expedition to take Chittagong back from Arakan. However, dissent in the ranks emerged because the commander was a personal officer of the subhadar, leading mostly imperial forces. The Arakanese recovered the strength with reinforcements who defended the city and cut off food supply lines, failing Qasim Khan's effort to subdue Chittagong.

In 1620, the Maghs of Arakan attacked the Bengali capital of Jahangirnagar (Dhaka). In response, Ibrahim Khan Fath-i-Jang defeated them and captured 400 Magh war boats. During his term, he freed Baro-Bhuiyan chief Musa Khan and his allies. It is said that Ibrahim Khan appointed Dilal Khan as Dhaka's naval commander.

In the same year, Jahangir conquered Kangra. His presence was observed by Mughal scholar Ahmad Sirhindi, who reported that Mughal forces had the Idols broken, a cow slaughtered, Khutbah sermon read, and other Islamic rituals performed. Jahangir's departure from Akbar was recorded by Terry, a traveller, who observed India between 1616 and 1619. He reported the mosques to be full of worshippers, the exaltation of Quran and Hadith practical teaching, and the complete observance of Fasting during Ramadan and Eid al-Fitr celebrations. Aurangzeb, son of Shah Jahan, led the Mughals in military campaigns, including the pacification of the Bundela Rajputs in Siege of Orchha in 1635.

In 1630, under the leadership of Pir Roshan's great-grandson, Abdul Qadir, a Pashtun tribal alliance consisted of the Yusufzai, Mandanrs, Kheshgi, Mohmand, Afridi, Bangash, and other tribes who launched an attack on the Mughal Army in Peshawar.

In 1646, Ustad Ahmad Lahori, led the Mughal army of Shah Jahan to Balkh to fight against Safavid Iran.

== Aurangzeb era ==
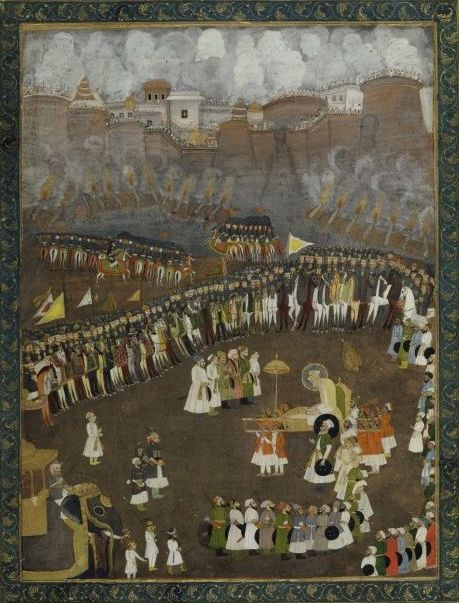
Aurangzeb leads the Mughal Army during the battle of Satara.

In March 1657 Maratha forces under Shivaji looted the Mughal army's barracks and made away with battle-hardened Arabian horses. Aurangzeb responded by sending general Nasiri Khan to administer a punitive campaign, defeating Shivaji's forces in Ahmednagar. Later, Aurangzeb and his army advanced towards Bijapur and besieged Bidar. Aurangzeb's forces used rockets and grenades while scaling the walls. Sidi Marjan was mortally wounded when a rocket struck his large gunpowder depot, and after twenty-seven days of hard fighting, the Mughals captured Bidar . Thus, Mughals annexed the wealthy city of Bidar.

In 1659, Aurangzeb sent general Raja Jai Singh to besiege the fort of Purandar, who fought off all attempts to relieve it. Foreseeing defeat, Shivaji agreed to terms. Jai Singh persuaded Shivaji to visit Aurangzeb at Agra, giving him a personal guarantee of safety. The meeting at the Mughal court did not go well, however. Shivaji felt slighted and insulted Aurangzeb by refusing imperial service. For this affront he was detained, but escaped. Shivaji returned to Deccan and crowned himself Chhatrapati, the ruler of the Maratha Kingdom in 1674. The Mughal's punitive campaign against the Marathas was interrupted by the civil war between Aurangzeb and his brothers due to the succession issue of the Mughal emperor after the death of Shah Jahan.

In 1662, the Mughals subdued the Ahom kingdom under Mir Jumla II, who conquered its capital, Garhgaon, and captured 100 elephants, 300000 coins, 8000 shields, 1000 ships, and 173 rice stores.

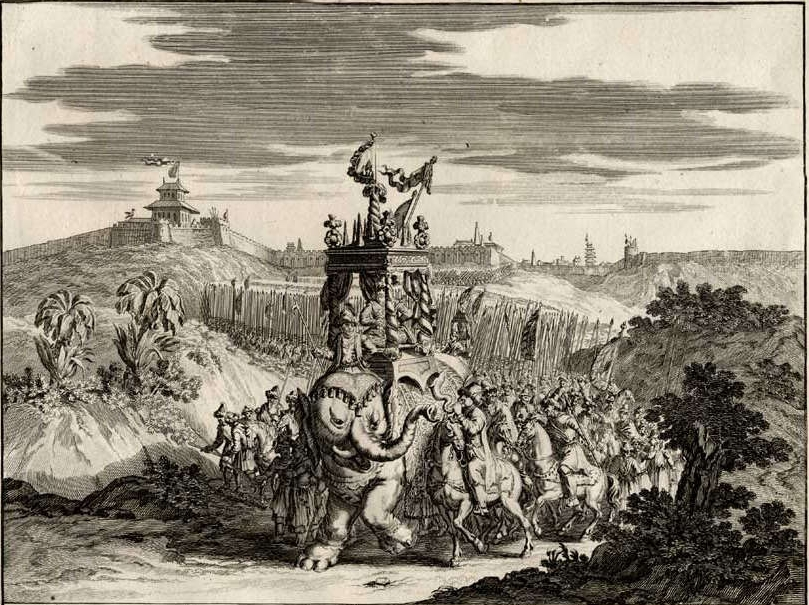
Depiction of the Mughal military march under Aurangzeb

In 1665, the Mughals won the Battle of Purandar against the Marathas, where a Mughal general Diler Khan engaging in battle and personally killed Murarbaji, the military general of Shivaji who defends Purandar Forts. In the Treaty of Purandar, signed by Shivaji and Jai Singh on 11 June, Shivaji agreed to relinquish 23 forts, pay 400,000 gold hun, and become a Mughal vassal, while sending Sambhaji, along with 5,000 cavalry, to become a ''mansabdar''.

In 1667, the Yusufzai tribe again revolted against the Mughals, with one of their chiefs in Swat proclaiming himself as the ruler. Muhammad Amin Khan brought a 9,000 strong Mughal Army from Delhi to suppress the revolt. Although Aurangzeb conquered the southern Yusufzai plains within the northern Kabul valley, he failed to wrest Swat and the adjoining valleys from their control.

In 1669, Hindu Jats organised a rebellion led by Gokula, a rebel landholder from Tilpat. By 1670 20,000 Jat rebels were quelled and the Mughal Army took control of Tilpat. Gokula's personal fortune amounted to 93,000 gold coins and hundreds of thousands of silver coins. In the end, Gokula was caught and executed. But the Jats rebelled again. Gokula's son Raja Ram Jat, in order to avenge his father's death, plundered Akbar's tomb of its gold, silver, and fine carpets, opened Akbar's grave and dragged his bones and burned them. Jats also shot the tops of the minarets on the gateway to Akbar's Tomb and melted down two silver doors from the Taj Mahal. Aurangzeb appointed Mohammad Bidar Bakht as commander to crush the rebellion. On 4 July 1688, Raja Ram Jat was captured and beheaded, his head sent to Aurangzeb as proof.

In 1679, the Mughals fought the Battle of Bhupalgarh (also spelled Bhupalgad) against the Maratha Kingdom, near present-day Khanapur, in a leadup to the Deccan wars. The Maratha were led by Shivaji. The battle resulted in the razing of the fort of Bhupalgarh and a decisive victory for the Mughals under general Diler Khan. Shivaji's son Sambhaji, who would later become the second king of the Maratha Empire, fought on the Mughal side after defecting from his father.

Until his death in 1680 Shivaji continued defying the Mughals ; he was succeeded by his son Sambhaji. Aurangzeb's third son Akbar left the Mughal court along with a few Muslim mansabdar supporters and joined Muslim rebels in the Deccan. In response, Aurangzeb moved his court to Aurangabad and took command of the Deccan campaign. The rebels were defeated and Akbar fled south to seek refuge with Sambhaji, Shivaji's successor. More battles ensued. Akbar fled to Persia and never returned.

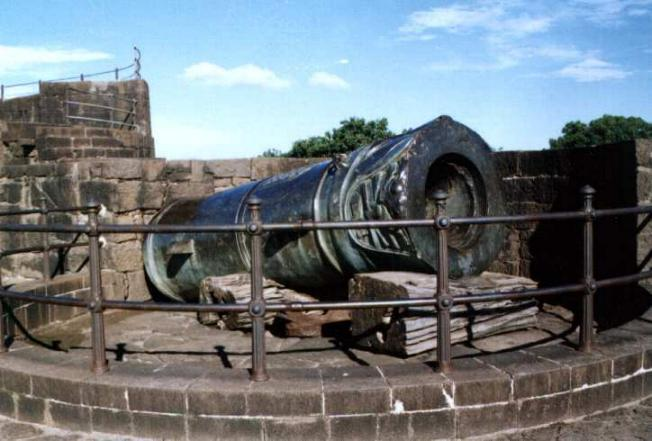
The legendary "Malik-i-Maidan" cannon is stated to be the largest piece of cast bronze ordnance in the world.

In 1683, Maratha Emperor Sambhaji launched a campaign to take Goa, which almost eliminated the Portuguese presence in that region. However, the sudden appearance of Mughal forces prevented their annihilation.

In 1685, the Mughals besieged Bijapur Fort, which was defended by 30,000 men led by Sikandar Adil Shah and his commander Sarza Khan. At first, the Mughal cannon batteries were overcome by the large and heavy Bijapur guns, such as the famous "Malik-i-Maidan", which fired cannonballs 69 cm in diameter. Instead of capturing territories on open ground, the Mughals dug long trenches and carefully placed their artillery, but made no further advancements. The Mughals could not cross the deep 10-ft moat surrounding Bijapur Fort. Moreover, the 50-ft high 25-ft wide fine granite and lime mortar walls were almost impossible to breach. The situation for the Mughals worsened when Maratha forces led by Melgiri Pandit under Maratha Emperor Sambhaji blocked food, gunpowder and weapon supplies arriving from the Mughal garrison at Solapur. The Mughals were struggling on both fronts and became overburdened by the siege and the roving Maratha forces. Things worsened when a Bijapuri cannonball struck a Mughal gunpowder position causing a massive explosion into the trenches that killed 500 infantrymen. After 18 months, in 1686, the Mughals annexed Bijapur, after the Siege of Bijapur, abd after Aurangzeb paid every soldier gold coins for each bucket of mud thrown into the moat, including the corpses of men and animals, finally allowing the Mughal forces to storm the fortress. To celebrate this victory, Aurangzeb spread his coins, mounted the throne of Adil Shahi, and inscribing the great cannon with Malik-e-Maidan. This event annulled the commercial treaty between the Portuguese with the Sultanate of Bijapur.

In 1687, Aurangzeb attacked the Golconda. In January, the Mughals besieged Golconda Fort , containing the Kollur Mine, for eight months. At the end of the siege, Aurangzeb and the Mughals entered Golconda victorious; the Qutb Shahis of Golconda and the ruler Abul Hasan Qutb Shah submitted to Aurangzeb and handed over several precious gems to the latter including the Nur-Ul-Ain Diamond, Orlov (diamond), Black Orlov, Darya-e-Nur, the Hope Diamond, the Wittelsbach Diamond and the Regent Diamond. The Golconda Sultanate was incorporated as a subah, or province of the Empire called Hyderabad Subah.

In February 1689, Aurangzeb's forces captured and executed Shivaji's successor, Sambhaji. Aurangzeb then drove the Maratha forces south, and expanded into the Deccan and southern India. The Maratha leader's successor Rajaram and later Rajaram's widow Tarabai and their Maratha forces fought Mughal forces. Territory changed hands repeatedly during these years (1689–1707). As no central authority ruled the Marathas, Aurangzeb was forced to contest every inch of territory, at great cost in lives and treasure. Even as Aurangzeb drove west, deep into Maratha territory – notably conquering Satara – the Marathas expanded eastwards into Mughal lands – Malwa and Hyderabad. The Marathas also expanded into Southern India, defeating the independent local rulers there and capturing Jinji in Tamil Nadu. In 1690, Mughal general Zulfiqar Khan Nusrat Jung, cooperating with the Madurai Nayak dynasty undergoing the Siege of Jinji in conflict against Maratha, after 8 years, they finally conquered the fort.

Aurangzeb faced a rebellion of the Sikhs in 1701. At first, the Sikh were incited by Guru Gobind Singh to form khalsa groups of militant movements. The Sikh Khalsas defeated those hill chiefs in the Battle of Anandpur (1700), they immediately appealed to Aurangzeb for assistance, who responded by sending instructions to Mughal officials in Punjab to take action against the Sikh. Wazir Khan, the governor of Sirhind, immediately sent his forces, who subdued the Sikhs in the second battle of Anandpur in 1703–1704. Another battle was fought in Chamkaur Sahib, where two sons of Guru Gobind were slain. Then in 1706, another military operation in Khidrana or Muktsar attempted to suppress the rebellion, which followed with Guru Gobind's move to Talwandi Sabo or Dam Dama.

Aurangzeb waged continuous war in the Deccan for more than two decades without resolution. He lost about one fifth of his army fighting Maratha rebellions in Deccan India. He travelled a long distance to the Deccan to conquer the Marathas before he died of natural causes at age 88, while fighting.

== After Aurangzeb ==
On 24 February 1739 at the battle of Karnal against Nader Shah, the Mughal involved an army of 75,000 combatants, 300,000 camp followers, and 2,000 elephants.

On 11 March 1748, the battle of Manupur took place between the forces of the rising Durrani Empire and Mughal armies led by Mughal Vizier Qamar ud-Din, in which the Mughals mobilized around 270,000 personnel.

Historian Pradeep P. Barua claimed that the successful takeover of Mughal-ruled India by the British Raj did not stem from the British Empire's sophisticated military, technology, or fighting skill, but rather the Raj's ability to offer political stability with their civil administration after the decline of Mughal authority. Adapted to fighting pitched battles in the northern Indian plains, the Mughal army was based on cavalry, sustaining itself with huge volumes of nutritious grass supplied by its vast territories.

However, the administrative positions of the Mughal central government continued at the provincial level.

== See also ==
- Army of the Mughal Empire
- List of battles involving the Mughal Empire
