= Mukarram Khan =

Mughal Subahdar of Odisha (1617–1621), Delhi (1621–1626) and Bengal (1626–1627)

Mukarram Khan Chisti

Thanadar of Bhawal
- In office 1612–1616
- Monarch: Jahangir

Governor of Koch Hajo
- In office 1616
- Monarch: Jahangir

Sardar of Sylhet
- In office 1617
- Monarch: Jahangir
- Preceded by: Mubariz Khan
- Succeeded by: Mirak Bahadur Jalair and Sulayman Banarsi

Subahdar of Orissa
- In office 1617–1621
- Monarch: Jahangir
- Preceded by: Kalyan Mal
- Succeeded by: Mirza Ahmad Beg

Subahdar of Delhi
- In office 1621–1626
- Monarch: Jahangir

17th Subahdar of Bengal
- In office 1626–1627
- Monarch: Jahangir
- Preceded by: Khan Jahan II
- Succeeded by: Fidai Khan I

Personal details
- Died: c. 1627 Jahangirnagar, Bengal, Mughal Empire
- Parent: Shaykh Bayazid Mu'azzam Khan (father)
- Relatives: Islam Khan I (father-in-law); Qutubuddin Koka (uncle); Salim Chishti (great grandfather)

Mukarram Khān Chishtī was the Subahdar of Bengal during the reign of Mughal emperor Jahangir from 1626 to 1627. He had previously served as the Thanadar of Bhawal, governor of Koch Hajo, Sardar of Sylhet and Subahdar of Orissa.

== Background ==
Mukarram was the son of Shaykh Badi Bayazid, who was later known as Mu'azzam Khan. The Shaykh was a grandson of Salim Chishti of Fatehpur Sikri. Mukarram's paternal grandmother milk-nursed Jahangir on his birth. In 1596, Shaykh Bayazid became a mansabdar of 400 and later of 2,000 soldiers. At the ascension of Emperor Jahangir, the Shaykh became a mansabdar of 3,000 and given the title of Mu'azzam Khan on the 1st of Jumada al-Thani. He then became the Subahdar of Delhi Subah and in 1608, a mansabdar of 4,000 soldiers and 200 horses. He is buried in Fatehpur Sikri. Mukarram's brothers were Abd as-Salam and Muhi ad-Din Shaykh. Due to this noble background, Emperor Jahangir referred to Mukarram as a Khana-zad (a houseborn individual).

== Life ==
=== Thanadar of Bhawal ===
In 1612, during the Mughal battle against Khwaja Usman at Daulambapur, Mukarram Khan was made the thanadar of Bhawal.

Later that year, Mukarram Khan was appointed by his father-in-law, Subahdar Islam Khan I, as the chief commander for the expedition of Koch Hajo against Raja Parikshit Narayan. Mukarram marched from Bhawal to Toke where he waited for Abd as-Salam, Mirza Nathan and the other soldiers. The forces reached Mukarram in three marches and he hosted them in his camp with great veneration. Mukarram was given a horse and a number of imperial gifts. Mukarram kissed his brother's hand and the hands of the other soldiers.

Three days later, Mukarram and his forces marched on from Toke and were joined by the forces of Shaykh Kamal and Raja Raghunath. During the fourth march from Toke on the last day of Ramadan, a row took place between Mukarram and Mirza Nathan. Mukarram had announced that the march shall take place after Iftar, however Nathan's colleague, Shaykh Ashraf of Hansi, disagreed and suggested that they should start marching as there is no enemy behind them. Mirza's force started to march which angered Shaykh Kamal (who was with Mukarram's force). Kamal sent his messenger, Nizam, to Mirza reminding them that Mukarram is their commander and that it is only Mukarram's responsibility to sound the march-drums. The Baharistan-i-Ghaibi details the back-and-forth arguments which took place between the two forces during the Hajo expedition. Mukarram decided to leave Nathan alone and instead report the matter to the Subahdar, Islam Khan I. As the quarrels continued, Mukarram patiently awaited the Subahdar's response which finally came, ordering Mukarram to maintain peace with Nathan and continue the expedition.

The expedition was successful and Mukarram was given the news of Islam Khan I's death when he reached back. Parikshit was defeated and Mukarram presented him and his sons to the new Subahdar, his uncle, Qasim Khan Chishti. Mukarram was later ordered by Qasim to hand over Parikshit to him. However, Mukarram politely refused to do so. Qasim then plotted a plan for the next morning in which when Mukarram enters the court, not to allow many of his men to join him and then forcibly seize Parikshit. The plan was successful and Mukarram became helpless and returned to his home, in Yarasindur, leaving the Raja. The success of the expedition was also noticed by Emperor Jahangir who promoted Mukarram's rank by 125 soldiers. Emperor Jahangir gave Mukarram a flag on 11 February 1614. In 1616, Mukarram gifted the Emperor jewels and offerings from Bengal.

=== Sardar of Sylhet ===
Following the death of Mubariz Khan, in 1617, the Subahdar of Bengal Qasim Khan Chishti intended to appoint Mirak Bahadur Jalair to govern the Sylhet Sarkar. However, after learning that Mirak had fled to Sylhet from his appointed territory, which had recently been conquered by Mubariz with a lot of difficulty, Qasim was not impressed at what he viewed as "cowardice". Qasim changed his mind and sent his officer, Abdul Nabi, to Yarasindur, where Mukarram and his brothers were staying. Mukarram was brought to Jahangirnagar and Qasim Khan visited him in his own home to give him the honour of having sardarship over the entire Sylhet Sarkar as well as giving Mukarram's brothers lesser roles in Sylhet. Mukarram was later invited to join the army against the Maghs who had raided the Bhulua Thana.

Only a few months after Sardarship, the Subahdar removed Mukarram from this post out of dissatisfaction and replaced him with Mirak Bahadur Jalair, as Sylhet's chief sardar and Sulayman Banarsi to govern Uhar and Taraf. Mukarram was very angered by Qasim's actions and marched with his brothers to Jahangirnagar and then to Yarasindur. Here, Mukarram told his younger brother, Abd as-Salam, to take a boat to Patna and then travel by land to the capital, at Agra, to seek redress from Emperor Jahangir.

=== Subahdar of Orissa ===
Due to his experience in the military and in administration, Mukarram was able to attain the role as governor of Orissa Subah. His rule in Orissa was said to have been very harsh. Raja Purushottama of Khurda rebelled against Mukarram and so Mukarram invaded Khurda and annexed it to the Mughal Empire in 1617. Purushottama fled to Rajahmundry but later managed to regain his seat in Khurda. Emperor Jahangir was informed of this and awarded him as a mansabdar of 3,000 soldiers and 2,000 horses. Mukarram was honoured with drums, his own horse as well as being gifted a robe of honour.

When Bahadur Khan Hijliwal, the Baro-Bhuiyan zamindar of Hijli, was summoned to Jahangirnagar by the Subahdar of Bengal Ibrahim Khan Fath-i-Jang, Bahadur openly rebelled and was supported by Mukarram. Mirza Muhammad Beg Abakash, the thanadar of Burdwan, was ordered to confront Bahadur, giving him a choice to peacefully go to the Subahdar's court or be beheaded. Abakash was given 200 of Musa Khan and his brothers' war boats. Bahadur then asked Mukarram for assistance, to which Mukarram sent 1000 cavalry. As the Subahdar's army advanced towards Hijli and launched a heavy attack, Bahadur expected further aid from Mukarram. However, Mukarram retreated, leaving Bahadur to give up and make peace with the Empire.

=== Subahdar of Delhi ===
Mukarram later went to the imperial court of Jahangir where he was made the Subahdar of Delhi Subah as well as the Faujdar of Mewat in 1621.

=== Subahdar of Bengal ===
Subahdar of Bengal Muhabbat Khan, rebelled against emperor Jahangir in 1626. But after failing the attempt, Muhabbat fled to Deccan. Then Mukarram Khan was appointed the new governor of Bengal.

In Bengal, he would travel around on a boat. One day, he ordered for his boat to go back to land so that he could offer the Asr prayer. Due to a heavy wind, Mukarram and his colleagues drowned died in 1627. He and his colleagues are considered shahid (martyrs) in Islam. Fidai Khan was appointed the next subahdar.
