= Mirak Bahadur Jalair =

Mughal Sardar of Sylhet (1617-1620)

Mirak Jalair Bahadur

Sardar of Sylhet
- In office 1617-1620
- Monarch: Jahangir
- Governor: Islam Khan I
- Preceded by: Mukarram Khan
- Succeeded by: Mirza Ahmad Baig

Mirak Bahadur Jalair (Bengali: মীরক বাহাদুর জলাইর, romanized: Mirok Bahadur Jolair, Persian: میرک بهادر جلایر, romanized: Mīrak Bahādur Jalāyir) was a Mughal officer during the reign of Emperor Jahangir. He served as the chief sardar of Sylhet Sarkar from 1617 to 1620.

== Background ==
Mirak Bahadur Jalair was a Western Mongol or Chagatai Turk who belonged to the Jalair tribe. Many Jalairs migrated to the subcontinent where they served as high-ranking officials. Jalair had a fifteen-year-old slave called Suhayl.

== Biography ==
=== During Akbar's reign ===
“Mirak Bahadur Jalair accompanied Hussain Quli Beg in the hunt against Mirza Sharaf ad-Din at Ajmer. After Sharaf heard of the Mughal plot, he stationed his comrade Tarkhan Diwana and fled to Jalore. The Mughals managed to capture Ajmer in two to three days and made Diwana surrender. They then proceeded to Jalore.”

=== During Islam Khan's governorship ===
Jalair was appointed by the Subahdar of Bengal, Islam Khan I, to join the army led by Shaykh Ghiyathuddin Inayat Khan against Khwaja Usman as well as various other Baro-Bhuiyans and rebellious chieftain zamindars of Bengal.

Jalair lived in the Chandrapratap Pargana. This large pargana was captured by rebels, namely Mirza Mumin, Dariya Khan, Madhava Ray and Binud Ray (who pledged allegiance to Musa Khan, the leader of the Baro-Bhuiyans) after defeating Dilir Bahadur, the Mughal officer stationed there and aided by Ihtimam Khan's officers. The rebels believed that they could also effortlessly defeat Jalair to secure Chandrapratap to Musa Khan's domain once more. They readied a large naval fleet in addition to their land-force, infantry and cavalry in the early morning and attacked the Mughal fort of Chandrapratap. Jalair defended the fort but the rebels had surrounded them and were very close to making the fort fall. News of this reached Tuqmaq Khan who was at Shahzadapur. Tuqmaq, leaving a force to defend Shahzadapur, rushed to Bahadur's rescue with another force. The rebels had reached the gate of the Chandrapratap fort and were persecuting its inmates. Jalair's slave Suhayl led a group of people out of the fort. Outnumbered, they were heavily wounded. The fort was said not to have fallen due to Dariya Khan's near-sightedness. With the arrival of Tuqmaq and his forces, sounded by a trumpet, the rebels hopelessly fled.

Jalair was then appointed to join the army alongside Shaykh Kamal and Tuqmaq Khan to Jahangirnagar, which they reached with great difficulty in six marches. They worked on establishing a fort here. Islam Khan I later ordered Jalair to go to the Mohana of the Kutharuiya (modern-day Kirtinasha, tributary of the Padma) bringing twenty war-boats with him. When Islam Khan reached Kutharuiya in the last pahar of the night, he took the twenty boats with him through the Isamati aiming to capture Jatrapur, which he successfully did. Following this, Khan immediately ordered Jalair, as well as Shir Khan Tarin and Bayazid Khan Pani, to also cross the Isamati and secure the Mohana of Dakchara. Jalair and his associates were also successful in defeating the rebels at Dakchara, who had put many obstacles in an attempt to stop the Mughals. The next expedition in which Jalair took part was to Kalakopa. Islam Khan I appointed him, Mubariz Khan and Tuqmaq Khan to be posted in the rear with ninety war-boats. Jalair was noted for his maturity when intervening in two quarrels that emerged in both of these expeditions; the first being between Mirza Nathan and Iftikhar Khan over who is to be credited for the Dakchara victory, in which Jalair brought about peace, and the second being between Hakim Qudsi and Mirza Nathan on behalf of Ihtimam Khan, in which Jalair protected Qudsi from being "cut to pieces".

After the surrender of Musa Khan in 1609, the next target of the Mughal Empire was Khwaja Usman of Bokainagar, who was the leader of the Afghans in Bengal. Jalair and Abdur Razzaq Shirazi joined the leaders of this expedition, Shaykh Kamal and Shaykh Abdul Wahid, at Hasanpur (modern-day Haybatnagar). The army was instructed to build numerous forts, one every five days. At the eighteenth fort, Usman appeared with a small army to attack them. Shaykh Kamal ordered the Mughals not to respond and attempted to stop people from leaving the fort; however, many were tempted, including Jalair, by Usman and left the fort to fight him. The Mughals attained a victory by making use of the cannons at their fort, and Usman's forces were heavily defeated. Usman and his men fled back to Bokainagar for safety. After the construction of the nineteenth fort, Jalair and his contemporaries took a break with the approach of the Islamic month of Ramadan, during which they would observe fasting. The Mughals had a tradition in this month to have an iftar banquet in a different person's camp each day. Following the celebration of Eid al-Fitr, news had reached that Usman had evacuated his fort in Bokainagar with 250 men, fleeing to Sylhet after he heard that his allies, Dariya Khan Pani and Nasir Khan of Tajpur, had joined the Mughal forces. Following the Eid prayers, the army reached Bokainagar, where they stopped, awaiting new commands following Usman's fleeing. Jalair joined the imperialists in the final battle against Khwaja Usman at Daulambapur in 1612. Jalair later took part in the expedition against Bayazid of Sylhet led by Shaykh Kamal. Under the chief command of Mukarram Khan, Jalair was also appointed to accompany the imperialists against Raja Parikshit of Koch Hajo in 1612.

=== During Qasim Khan's governorship ===
During the Subahdarship of Qasim Khan Chishti, Jalair, Mubariz and other thanadars were in Jahangirnagar, and not serving at their appointed thanas. The Subahdar was displeased with this behaviour and their persistent excuses, and sent a message to Emperor Jahangir about their misconduct. A reply was issued saying that Jalair was revoked of the title Bahadur and was now to be known as simply Mirak Jalair (and the same was done to the other thanadars). Jalair and Mubariz had already returned to their thana at Bundasil by this time, without hearing the reply from the Court. In this case, Qasim Khan ordered his bakhshi (paymaster), Khwaja Tahir Muhammad, to reinstate their titles and jagirs and to inform the imperial Court of this reform.

At Bundasil, Sardar Mubariz of Sylhet decided to lead an expedition with Jalair to Pratapgarh which was under the domain of the Raja of Kachar. During this expedition, they came across a tribe which lived in between the lands of the Khasis and the Kacharis, who referred to themselves as Mughals. The Mughal books claim that this tribe was indeed a descendant of the Turco-Mongol Timurids. They have said that during the reign of Timur in the late 12th century, the emperor had reached this extreme point and left a group of Mongols to protect the land before returning to his capital in Baghdad. Members of this tribe were white-skinned, spoke a Sino-Tibetan language, ate all sorts of animals and vegetables, and wore large turbans and big brass earrings (tunkal). They managed to defeat this tribe with a lot of difficulty, and annexed some of their land to the Mughal Empire. Some tribal members were sent alive to Qasim Khan. Mubariz returned to Sylhet thana and appointed Jalair to govern this new tribal area and to keep a lookout for trouble. Qasim Khan then sent these tribal people to the Emperor, who was pleased with the hard work of Jalair and his comrades and raised their ranks and wages. The troops proceeded to the Kachari Kingdom, managing to defeat the Raja and establishing a fort and thana in Asurainagar. The Raja sent his envoy saying that he will give a tribute of 40 elephants, 100,000 rupees, and rare artefacts to Jahangir, 5 elephants and 20,000 rupees to Qasim as well as 2 elephants and 20,000 rupees for Mubariz and Mirak.

After the death of Mubariz, Qasim Khan intended to appoint Jalair as the next Sardar of Sylhet. However, after learning that Jalair had fled from his appointed tribal territory, which had recently been conquered with a lot of difficulty, Qasim was unimpressed at what he viewed as "cowardice". Qasim changed his mind and sent Officer Abdul Nabi to Yarasindur, where Mukarram Khan was staying with his brothers. Mukarram was brought to Jahangirnagar and Qasim Khan visited him in his own home to give him the honour of having sardarship over the entire Sylhet Sarkar as well as giving Mukarram's brothers lesser roles in Sylhet. Qasim Khan removed Mukarram Khan from his post as the Sardar of Sylhet out of dissatisfaction in 1617. Mukarram was replaced with Jalair, as Sylhet's chief sardar and Sulayman Banarsi to govern Uhar and Taraf. On 30 March 1620, Jalair was promoted as mansabdar of 1,000 soldiers and 200 horses.

== See also ==
- History of Bengal
- History of Bangladesh
- History of India
- History of rulers of Bengal

Political offices
Preceded by Mukarram Khan	Sardar of Sylhet; 1617-1620	Succeeded by Mirza Ahmad Baig and Ibn Banarsi
