= Mubariz Khan (Bengal) =

Mughal Sardar of Sylhet (1612–1617)

Sardar of Sylhet
- In office 1612–1617
- Monarch: Jahangir
- Governor: Islam Khan I, Qasim Khan Chishti
- Preceded by: Baro-Bhuyans
- Succeeded by: Mukarram Khan

Personal details
- Died: 1617

Mubāriz Khān (Bengali: মুবারিজ খান, Persian: مبارز خان) was a Mughal Empire commander during the reign of emperor Jahangir. He took part in many battles against the rebel Baro-Bhuiyans of Bengal. He also served as officer of Fort Jatrapur and later as the Sardar of Sylhet Sarkar.

== Background ==
Mubariz was brought up in a Mughal household. His brothers were Shah Baig Khaksar, Buzakhur and Bahadur Baig.

== Life ==
=== Under Islam Khan ===
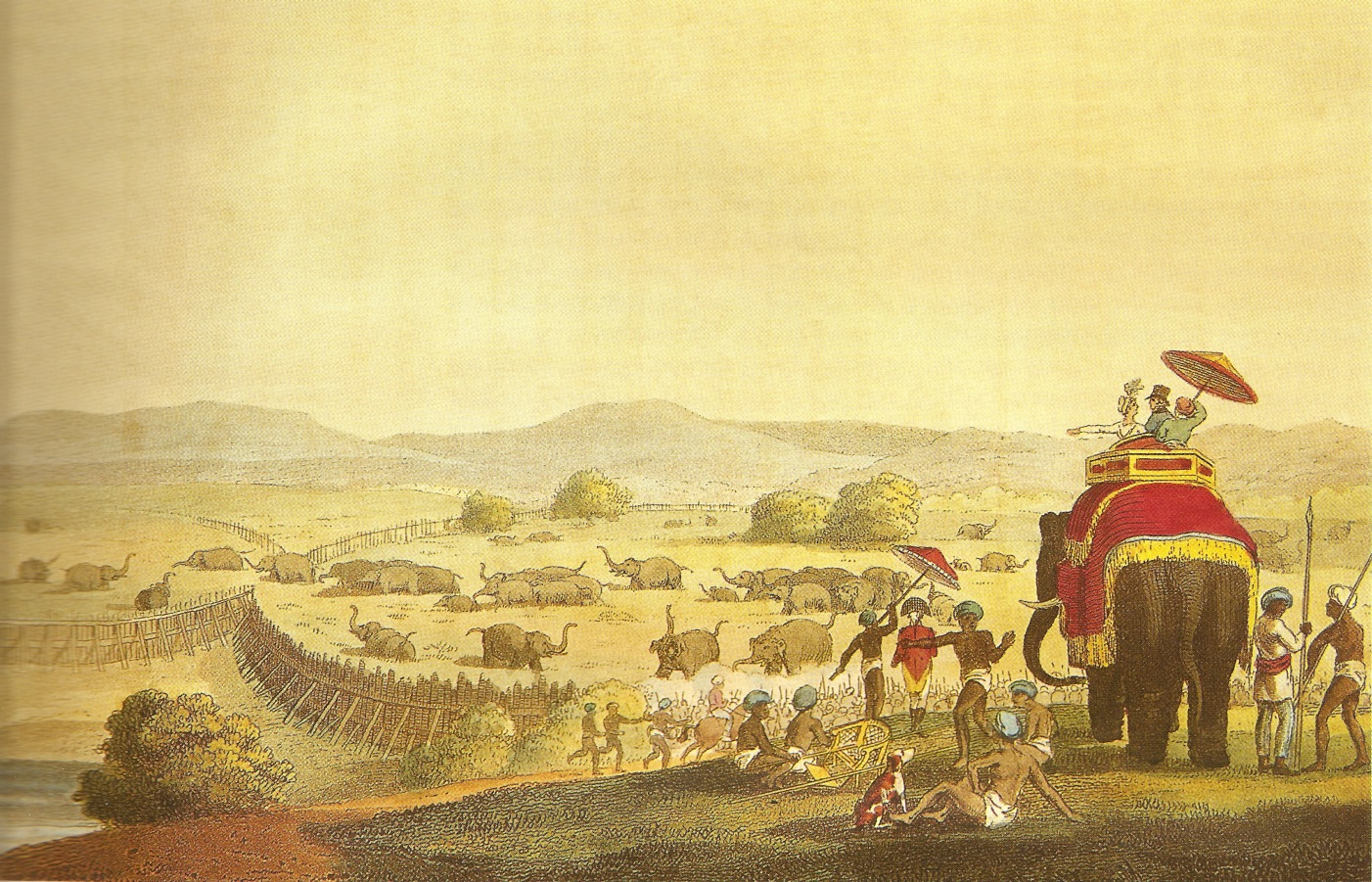
The depiction of a Khedda taking place in 1808 by the British. This tradition was widely practised in India.

At Nazirpur, the soldiers were told to perform a khedda (catch wild elephants). Mubariz, alongside Iftikhar and Satrajit, were able to bring back a few elephants to the Qamargah (ring-hunt). Following Islam Khan's arrival to Nazirpur, the Subahdar commenced the khedda himself and the troops caught 135 elephants in total. Three elephants were given to Mubariz.

Mubariz and his brothers, Buzakhur and Bahadur, were told by the Subahdar of Bengal, Islam Khan I, to accompany the latter's brother, Shaykh Habibullah, in an expedition against Majlis Qutb of Fathabad. They managed to gain control of Fort Matibhanga and reduce large areas of Qutb's domain. The Mughal forces eventually captured Fathabad. Qutb wrote a letter to Musa Khan pleading for help to which Musa deputed an army led by Mirza Mumin ibn Masum Khan equipped with 200 war-boats. A number of battles took place between Mumin and Raja Satrajit, finally leading to Satrajit driving the rebels off.

After Mubariz's return to Jahangirnagar from Fathabad, he was given charge of Fort Jatrapur, which was previously run by the rebel Musa Khan. During Islam Khan's expedition to Kalakopa, Mubariz was posted in the rear alongside Tuqmaq Khan and Mirak Bahadur Jalair with ninety war-boats. Mubariz was rewarded with a shawl for his hard work.

Mubariz also took part in the expedition against Khwaja Usman of Bokainagar. Anwar Khan realised that the Mughals were defeating many of the rebels and so he decided to surrender and offer to help the Mughals in defeating Usman. Islam Khan I agreed for Anwar to take part in their expedition. However, this was a conspiracy of Anwar's which he sent a letter about to Mahmud Khan, telling him to inform Usman and other rebels of his plans in kidnapping Mughal officers and taking them to Baniachong, in Greater Sylhet - the last stronghold for rebels. Mubariz was made the commander of the Mughal regiment. When Mubariz reached Yarasindur, he received a message from Islam Khan I telling him to continue until he reaches Toke thana, where he should wait for his arrival and leave the rest of the army to continue being led by Islam Quli. Anwar then notified Mubariz Khan and others, inviting them to a banquet, to which the Mughals accepted. The following morning, Mubariz was not feeling too well and decided not to go to the banquet. When the others went to the banquet, Anwar kidnapped Islam Quli and Raja Ray, and then fled to Baniachong. After Islam Khan I was informed of this incident, he changed his plan as soon as he reached Toke by ordering Mubariz to go and attack Anwar's forces. Raja Satrajit initiated a battle against Anwar in Baniachong which continued until Mubariz's arrival, in which Anwar pleaded for ceasefire and submitted himself, hoping that the outcome of Usman's battle goes well so that he could continue fighting later.

The expedition coincided with the Islamic month of fasting. The Mughals had a tradition in Ramadan to have a banquet in a different person's camp each day. On the last day of Ramadan (30 Ramadan 1020 A.H. or 5 December 1611) the banquet was to happen in Mubariz's camp. A large celebration took place as the officers broke their fast and sighted the moon. Trumpets were blown and cannons fired. The author of the Baharistan-i-Ghaibi, Mirza Nathan, compared the processions to an earthquake.

Following the celebration of Eid al-Fitr, Usman had evacuated his fort in Bokainagar with 250 men, fleeing to Sylhet after he heard that his allies, Dariya Khan Pani and Nasir Khan of Tajpur, had joined the Mughal forces. Anwar, who had previously called for ceasefire, heard of Usman's departure and surrendered to Mubariz and Satrajit with no hope left. Mubariz ordered Anwar to be imprisoned to chains, and Anwar put on the rope of obedience and kissed the feet of the officers.

Pratapaditya of Jessore later surrendered to the Mughals, sending his son Sangramaditya to Islam Khan I and donating 80 war boats. The Subahdar then sent an army led by Ghiyas Khan to punish Pratapaditya for his past actions and to reincorporate Jessore to Mughal territory. Mubariz Khan accompanied Ghiyas on this mission. Mubariz also accompanied Shaykh Kamal's expedition against Bayazid of Sylhet. Following the death of Usman and surrender of Bayazid, Mubariz was appointed in command of all imperial officers in Sylhet by Shaykh Kamal.

=== Under Qasim Khan ===
During the Subahdarship of Qasim Khan Chishti, Mubariz Khan, Mirak Bahadur Jalair and other thanadars were in Jahangirnagar, and not serving at their appointed thanas. The Subahdar was displeased by this behaviour and their persisting excuses, and sent a message to Emperor Jahangir of their misconduct. A reply was issued saying that Mubariz was revoked of the title Khan and was now to be known as Mubariz Baig, and Mirak as simply Mirak Jalair. However, by this time, Mubariz, Mirak and some other thanadars had already returned to their posts, without hearing the reply from the Court. Due to this case, Qasim Khan ordered his bakhshi (paymaster), Khwaja Tahir Muhammad, to reinstate their titles and jagirs and to inform the imperial Court of this reformation.

Mubariz, wishing that when a new Subahdar arrives that he could show him his record of achievements and get on his good side, decided to lead an expedition to Pratapgarh, also under the domain of the Raja of Kachar. During this expedition, Mubariz came across a tribe which lived in between the lands of the Khasis and the Kacharis, who referred to themselves as Mughals. The Mughal books claim that this tribe was indeed a descendant of the Turco-Mongol Timurids. They have said that during the reign of Timur in the late 12th century, the emperor had reached this extreme point and left a group of Mongols to protect the land before returning to his capital in Baghdad. Members of this tribe were white-skinned, spoke a Sino-Tibetan language, ate all sorts of animals and vegetables, and wore large turbans and big brass earrings (tunkal). Mubariz managed to defeat this tribe with a lot of difficulty, and annexed some of their land to the Mughal Empire. Some tribal members were sent alive to Qasim Khan. Mubariz returned to Sylhet thana and appointed Mirak Bahadur Jalair to govern this new tribal area and to keep a lookout for trouble. Qasim Khan then sent these people to the Emperor, who was pleased with the hard work of Mubariz and his forces and raised his rank and wage.

It is considered that this tribe were Meitei people as they speak the Sino-Tibetan language of Meitei. In Assam and Greater Sylhet, these groups of people used to be referred to as "Mei-Moglai".

Mubariz Khan later invaded the Kachari Kingdom as commander of the expedition, managing to defeat the Raja and establishing a fort and thana in Asurainagar. The Raja sent his envoy to Mubariz saying that he will give a tribute of 40 elephants, 100,000 rupees, and rare artefacts to Emperor Jahangir, 5 elephants and 20,000 rupees to Subahdar Qasim as well as 2 elephants and 20,000 rupees for Mubariz and Mirak. Mubariz returned to Sylhet, pleased with the tribute, and informed Qasim of this success. The gifts were sent to Jahangirnagar for Qasim, who then sent it forward to the imperial court of Emperor Jahangir.

== Death ==
Mubariz Khan died of natural causes. Qasim Khan Chishti intended to appoint Mirak Bahadur Jalair to govern the Sylhet Sarkar. However, after learning that Mirak had fled from his appointed territory, which had recently been conquered by Mubariz with a lot of difficulty, Qasim was not impressed at what he viewed as "cowardice". Qasim changed his mind and sent his officer, Abdul Nabi, to Yarasindur, where Mukarram Khan was staying with his brothers. Mukarram was brought to Jahangirnagar and Qasim Khan visited him in his own home to give him the honour of having sardarship over the entire Sylhet Sarkar as well as giving Mukarram's brothers lesser roles in Sylhet.

== See also ==
- History of Bengal
- History of Bangladesh
- History of India
- History of rulers of Bengal

Political offices
Preceded by Baro-Bhuiyans	Sardar of Sylhet; 1612-1617	Succeeded by Mukarram Khan
