= Tatar Khan Naghir =

Afghan chieftain in Mymensingh (d. 1611)

- تاتار خان ناغر
- Born: 16th century
- Died: 1611 near Hasanpur, Bengal Subah, Mughal Empire (present-day Haybatnagar, Kishoreganj, Bangladesh)
- Military career
- Allegiance: Eastern Afghan Confederates
- Group leader: Khwaja Usman
- Rank: Soldier
- Conflicts: Eleventh Fort Affray

Tātār Khān Nāghir (Pashto: تاتار خان ناغر; d. 1611) was a soldier of the Eastern Afghan Confederates, during the reign of Mughal emperor Jahangir. Although he fought against the Mughal Empire, Mughal documents such as the Baharistan-i-Ghaibi described him to have the "boldness of a lion of the forest".

== Biography ==
Khan was born to a Pashtun Muslim family. He belonged to the tribe of Naghir who were descended from Naghir, son of Dani, son of Gharghasht, son of Qais Abdur Rashid. Khan entered the service of Khwaja Usman, the leader of the Eastern Afghan Confederates, and fought against the Mughals.

Usman and his forces, which included Naghir, would often launch surprise attacks at the Mughal fort-builders near Hasanpur (modern-day Haybatnagar in Kishoreganj), who would build a fort every five days as they moved. When the Mughal camp pitched themselves at the eleventh fort, Usman and the Afghans came to oppose the Mughals. In this occasion, Tatar Khan Naghir directly attacked the fort. An affray took place between Khwaja Khan and Mirza Isfandiyar against Naghir, who was now on his own as the other Afghans had fled, fearing the Mughal artillery. Khwaja Khan and Isfandiyar swung their swords at Naghir and threw javelins and shot guns. Both sides suffered wounded though only Naghir was killed.

The Mughals had a custom of respecting the dead, regardless of allegiance. They sprinkled large amounts of saffron perfume on Naghir's body before sending some men to carry Naghir on a palanquin back to his leader Usman's presence. Although the Mughals and Afghans continued their warfare as time passed, this occasion was appreciated by both sides and regarded as an act of humanity, manliness and religiosity.

== See also ==
- Mughal weapons
- Islam Khan I
