= Majlis Khan Humayun =

Bengali statesman

Governor of Garh-Jaripa
- In office 1491
- Monarch: Firuz Shah II
- Preceded by: Raja Dalip Samanta

Personal details
- Died: Garh-Jaripa, Sultanate of Bengal
- Resting place: Garh-Jaripa, Sultanate of Bengal

Majlis Khan Humayun, also known as Majlis Shah Humayun, was a military commander in service of the Sultanate of Bengal who led the conquest of Garh-Dalipa (renamed to Garh-Jaripa) in present-day Sherpur District, Bangladesh. His military exploits led to the strategic northern expansion of the Sultanate's authority, and the takeover of the region from the Kamarupan Koch dynasty and its ruler, Raja Dalip Samanta, who was subsequently executed. According to Sarat Chandra Ghoshal, the magnitude of the Bengali victory in Garh-Jaripa can be compared to the scale of the rise of Biswa Singha in Kamata.

== Career ==
Majlis Khan Humayun was appointed by Sultan of Bengal Saifuddin Firuz Shah to lead a military expedition into the territory of Kamarupa. Crossing the vast Brahmaputra River in 1491, Humayun's forces marched into what is now Jamalpur, Sherpur and northern Mymensingh, successfully seizing Garh-Dalipa, a regional Koch stronghold of strategic importance and the site of Chand Sadagar's dinghy. The fall of Raja Dalip in this campaign signified a decisive end to the Koch resistance and the formal introduction of Muslim rule in the area.

Following the conquest, Humayun was entrusted with governing the newly annexed region. He is credited with establishing the Bokainagar Fort and Tajpur forts, vital military and administrative centres that secured the Bengal Sultanate’s defence measures vis a vis the Garo Hills. His administrative and military leadership helped solidify Sultan Firuz Shah’s control across this area during a time of regional upheaval. Located approximately six kilometres from modern-day Sherpur, Garh-Dalipa (Fort of Dalip) was renamed to Garh-Jaripa after the Muslim saint Jarip Shah, who is believed to have played a role in the establishment. Humayun named the fort after Jarip Shah, who only agreed to vacate his spot if the new settlement bore his name. The saint’s tomb, located on the eastern edge of Kalidah Sea, remains a ziyarat site. Under Humayun, the fortified city spanned about 1,100 acres, the fort was an extensive military complex featuring seven concentric earthen walls and six defensive moats. The site was accessible via four gates: Kumuduari (east), Paniduari (west), Shyamuduari (south), and Khirkiduari (north) and housed towers and bastions for defense.

== Legacy ==
Majlis Khan Humayun was interred within the Garh-Jaripa fort that he governed. Arabic inscriptions found at his tomb were translated by the Asiatic Society of Calcutta in the 19th century. Additionally, the Barduari Shahi Mosque is believed to have been built during Humayun's rule. Rediscovered in the early 1980s by Maulana Azizul Haque Jamalpuri after a three year search for the lost mosque, the mosque was buried under layers of earth and vegetation until excavation revealed its three domes and intricately designed 12-door structure. Reconstructed in 1984, the mosque measures approximately 100 feet by 40 feet and serves as a symbol of Humayun's legacy in Sherpur. Near the Khirkiduari northern gate of the Garhjaripa fort, a Koch temple once stood, believed to be associated with the royal family of Raja Dalip. Following the conquest, the temple was converted into a mosque. A traditional fair in honour of Raja Dalip’s mother continues to be held by the tribal community every Vaishakha. As the archaeological heritage and relics of Garhjaripa face the threat of ruin, the government has taken action to preserve them. A committee, led by Sreebardi Upazila Nirbahi Officer (UNO) Nilufa Aktar, has been formed to oversee these efforts. The committee plans to publish a booklet on Garhjaripa’s history and collect relics from local residents. Additionally, they will recommend that the Department of Archaeology establish a museum at Garhjaripa to protect and showcase its cultural treasures.

== See also ==
- Shah Sultan Rumi
- Tipu Shah
