= Qasim Khan Juvayni =

Mughal Subahdar of Bengal from 1628 to 1632

- Amir

19th Subahdar of Bengal
- Reign: 1628–1632
- Predecessor: Fidai Khan I
- Successor: Azam Khan II
- Badshah: Shah Jahan
- Died: Sonargaon, Bengal, Mughal Empire
- Spouse: Manijah Begum
- Father: Mir Murad Juwaini
- Religion: Islam

Qasim Khan Juvayni (Bengali: কাসিম খান জুইনি, romanized: Qasim Khan Juini, Persian: قاسم خان جوینی) was a Mughal general and nobleman of the court of Mughal emperors Jahangir and Shah Jahan. He also served as the Subahdar of Bengal, succeeding Fidai Khan, from 1628 to 1631. He is most notable for the capture of Hugli off the Portuguese firingis.

== Background ==
Qasim Khan originated from Sabzevar (in present-day Afghanistan) which was historically part of greater Joveyn. His father was Mir Murad Juwaini, a renowned Syed of the town. Murad spent much of his life in the Deccan (giving rise to the name Mir Murad Dakhini) before being appointed by Akbar as 5-year old Shah Jahan's archery trainer. In 1602, Murad died while serving office as Bakshi (paymaster) and military administrator of Lahore.

== Life ==
Qasim Khan first served in Bengal as Khazanchi (treasurer) during the reign of Islam Khan Chishti. Chishti was known to have treated Qasim and his brother, Hashim, very well.

Qasim married Princess Manija Begum, the sister of Empress Nur Jahan. This marriage led to Qasim being given the title of Amir and receiving of a drum and flag. Consequently, he was sometimes in jest called by the officers of the court Qasim Khan Manija. Qasim Khan was an established poet, known to have written a diwan.

Qasim had a good relationship with Jahangir. The Emperor once requested Qasim to give him a glass of freshwater. As the earthen cup was so very fragile, it could not stand the weight of the water and broke. The Emperor looked towards Qasim Khan and said a verse: The cup was delicate, the water could not repose. Qasim Khan immediately spoke out the second half of the verse: He (or she) saw my condition, and could not restrain his (or her) tears. Jahangir later appointed him the Subahdar of Agra. Qasim built a grand house for himself in Agra city, which is now in ruins.

=== Governor of Bengal ===
He became the Subahdar of Bengal in the first year of Shah Jahan's reign in 1628, replacing Fidai Khan. He was promoted to the rank of mansabdar with 5,000 soldiers and horses. At this time, the Portuguese (Firingi) settlers had a provocative hold of the port-town of Hugli, taking part in immoral activities, slavery and forced conversions of Bengalis in Christianity. Shah Jahan wished to restrict the acts of the Portuguese in Bengal. In February 1632, Qasim Khan sent an army led by his son, Inayatullah Khan. The Mughals finally took possession of Hugli in September for three months. They slew about 10,000 Firingi men and women and drove the rest out from the town. This brought about the end of the Portuguese slave trade and forced conversions in Bengal. He died three days afterwards in 1632.

Preceded by Fidai Khan	Subahdar of Bengal; 1628–1632	Succeeded by Mir Muhammad Baqir Azam Khan

== See also ==
- List of rulers of Bengal
- History of Bengal
- History of Bangladesh
- History of India
