= Fidai Khan =

Mughal Subahdar of Bengal from 1627 to 1628

18th Subahdar of Bengal
- In office 1627–1628
- Monarchs: Jahangir; Shah Jahan
- Preceded by: Mukarram Khan
- Succeeded by: Qasim Khan

Personal details
- Born: Mirza Hedayetullah

Fidai Khan (born Mirza Hedayetullah, reigned: 1627–1628) was the subahdar of Bengal Subah during the reign of emperor Jahangir.

== Biography ==
Mirza Hedayetullah was the youngest of four brothers. Emperor Jahangir gave him the title Fidai Khan in 1617.

Khan held the post of Mir Bahr-i-Nawarah (Admiral of the Fleet) of the Mughals. After the death of Mukarram Khan, he was appointed subahdar of Bengal in 1627. But he ruled Bengal for about a year. Soon after the death of emperor Jahangir, he was replaced by Qasim Khan Juvayni. Afterwards,he also participated in the Mughal raid of Tarapur fort. Due to his achievements he was given Gorakhpur in Uttar Pradesh as his fief in 1627, and ruled there till his death in 1646.
