= Khaliajuri Upazila =

Khaliajuri খালিয়াজুড়ি
- Upazila
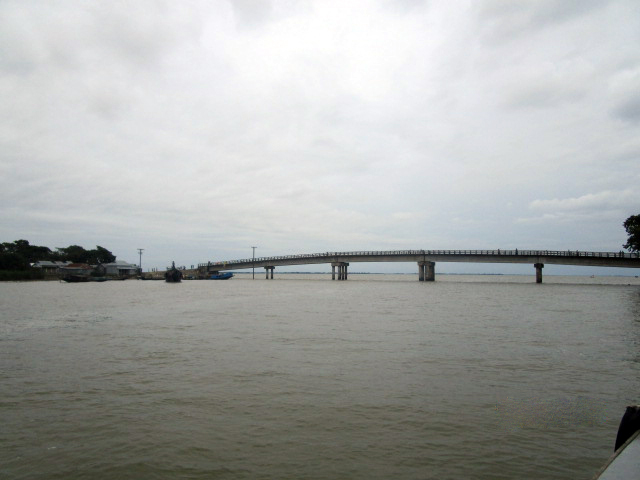
- Bridge at Boali Bazar

- Coordinates: 24°42′N 91°7.5′E
- Country: Bangladesh
- Division: Mymensingh
- District: Netrokona
- Thana: 1906
- Upazila: 1983

Government
  - Upazila Chairman: Ghulam Kibria Jabbar
  - MP (Netrokona-4): Rebecca Momin

Area
  - Total: 297.64 km^{2} (114.92 sq mi)

Population (2022)
  - Total: 96,345
  - Density: 323.70/km^{2} (838.37/sq mi)
- Time zone: UTC+6 (BST)
- Postal code: 2460
- Website: khaliajuri.netrokona.gov.bd

Khaliajuri Upazila mauza geocode map

Khaliajuri (Bengali: খালিয়াজুড়ি) is an upazila (sub-district) of the Netrokona District in Bangladesh, part of the Mymensingh Division.

== History ==
Until the middle of the fourteenth century AD, the Bhati Raja (Khaliajuri and surrounding areas) was the capital of Kamarupa. In the fourteenth century, a Kshatriya monk named Jitari invaded and occupied Bhati Rajya. Another Kshatriya monk named Lambodar came took over the rule of Bhati in the twelfth century. Nagendranath Basu asserts that Lambodar and Jitari may have been the same person.

In the 16th-century, Khaliajuri was home to a Bengali Hindu man called Shitanath Om. His three sons; Raghunath Om, Kamakhya Om and Maheshnath Om, later found employment under Khwaja Usman of Bokainagar, a Baro-Bhuiyan chief who had control over large parts of Greater Mymensingh. Following the defeat of Raja Subid Narayan of Ita by Khwaja Usman and his allies which included the Om family, the Om brothers migrated to Satgaon in Sreemangal, Sylhet where they were given jagir.

In 1906, a thana (police outpost) was established in Khaliajuri. Khaliajuri Thana's status was upgraded to upazila (sub-district) in 1983 as part of the President of Bangladesh Hussain Muhammad Ershad's decentralisation programme.

== Geography ==
Khaliajuri is located at 24.7000°N 91.1250°E. It has a total area of 297.64 km^{2} (114.92 sq mi). It is bounded by Mohanganj and Jamalganj upazilas on the north, Itna upazila on the south, Sulla and Derai upazilas on the east, Madan upazila on the west.

== Demographics ==
Historical population
| Year | Pop. | ±% |
|---|---|---|
| 1981 | 68,688 | — |
| 1991 | 75,801 | +10.4% |
| 2001 | 82,322 | +8.6% |
| 2011 | 97,450 | +18.4% |
| 2022 | 96,339 | −1.1% |
Source: Bangladesh Bureau of Statistics

Religions in Khaliajuri Upazila (2022)
| Religion | Percent |
| Islam | 66.30% |
| Hinduism | 33.69% |
| Other or not stated | 0.01% |

Population by religion in Union/Paurashava
| Upazila | Muslim | Hindu | Others |
|---|---|---|---|
| Chakua Union | 15,005 | 7,611 | 0 |
| Gazipur Union | 10,476 | 234 | 0 |
| Khaliajuri Union | 8,049 | 5,878 | 5 |
| Krishnapur Union | 9,329 | 4,585 | 6 |
| Mendipur Union | 20,699 | 4,690 | 2 |
| Nagar Union | 316 | 9,454 | 0 |

🟩 Muslim majority 🟧 Hindu majority

According to the 2022 Bangladeshi census, Khaliajuri Upazila had 21,736 households and a population of 96,345. 11.07% of the population were under 5 years of age. Khaliajuri had a literacy rate (age 7 and over) of 59.32%: 60.44% for males and 58.22% for females, and a sex ratio of 99.76 males for 100 females. 12,646 (13.13%) lived in urban areas.

== Administration ==
Khaliajuri Thana was formed in 1906 and it was turned into an upazila in 1983.

Khaliajuri Upazila is divided into six union parishads: Chakua, Gazipur, Khaliajuri, Krishnapur, Mendipur, and Nagar. The union parishads are subdivided into 54 mauzas and 75 villages.

List of chairmen
| Name | Term | Notes |
|---|---|---|
| Muhammad Abdus Shahid Chowdhury | 1983/11/7-1985/5/24 | In-charge |
| Abdul Jalil Chowdhury | 1985/5/25-1987/12/29 | |
| Muhammad Muinuddin | 1988/1/14-1988/2/14 | In-charge |
| Qazi Nurul Islam | 1988/2/15-1988/7/17 | In-charge |
| Siddiqur Rahman Taluqdar | 1988/7/17-1990/5/24 | |
| Haji Zaynul Abidin | 1990/5/28-1990/11/22 | In-charge |
| Abdul Mannan Taluqdar | 1990/11/23-1991/11/23 | |
| Ghulam Kibria Jabbar Krishnapuri | 2009/3/4-2014/4/1 | |
| Muhammad Shamsuzzaman Taluqdar Shuayb Siddiqi | 2014/4/2-2019/2/10 | |
| Ghulam Kibria Jabbar Krishnapuri | 2019/4/10–present | 2nd term |

== Notable people ==
- Mustafa Jabbar, inventor of the Bijoy Bengali keyboard which was formerly the most widely used Bengali input method
- Mohammad Hadis Uddin, 23rd Inspector General of Bangladesh Police
- Om family, historic Zamindar family

== See also ==
- Upazilas of Bangladesh
- Districts of Bangladesh
- Divisions of Bangladesh

== Gallery ==
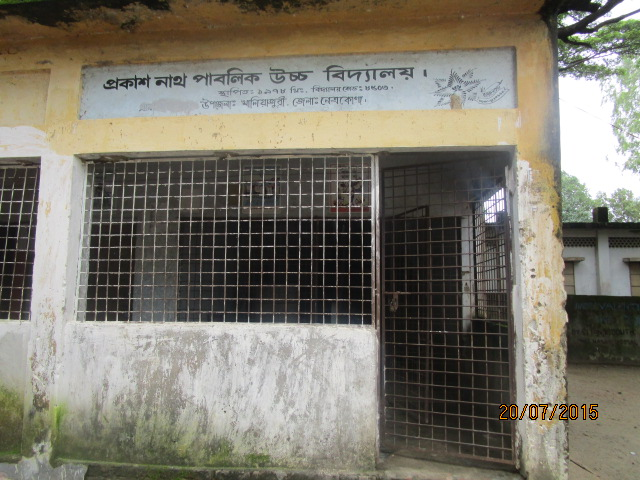
Prakash Nath Public High School
