= Om family =

Bengali family of landowners

Om ওম
- Country: Bangladesh
- Current region: Sreemangal Upazila, Moulvibazar District
- Earlier spellings: Hom (হোম)
- Etymology: See Om
- Origin: Khaliajuri, Mymensingh
- Founded: 17th-century
- Founder: Sitanath Om
- Titles: Chowdhury; Rai; Lala
- Estates: The valleys in Pargana Satgaon and later Pargana Balishira

The Om family (Bengali: ওম বংশ) was a Bengali family of landowners which served some notable roles throughout history, in the Sylhet region of present-day Bangladesh.

== History ==
The Oms trace their descent from Shitanath Om, a Bengali Hindu who resided in Khaliajuri, Mymensingh (now in Netrokona District) during Bengal's Baro-Bhuiyan period in the 17th century. Shitanath had three sons; Raghunath Om, Kamakhya Om and Maheshnath Om, all of whom later found employment under Khwaja Usman of Bokainagar, an Afghan chief who had control over large parts of Greater Mymensingh.

These three brothers joined Usman when he fled Mymensingh to avoid fighting with the Mughals. They eventually reached the Ita Kingdom of southern Sylhet which was ruled by Raja Subid Narayan. The Om brothers aided Usman in defeating Subid Narayan. Raghunath Om was killed in battle. After Usman had established his new capital at Uhar, he rewarded the two Om brothers by granting them jagir in the valley-area located in Pargana Satgaon. Leaving behind their possessions in Mymensingh (which had now come under Mughal rule), the Om family settled in the valley of Pargana Satgaon where they built a home. They later acquired land from the Maharaja of Tripura and became mirashdars, a role which the family inherited through time. Mirashdar was a term referring to a landowner who paid taxes directly to the government, in this case the Twipra Kingdom and later the Mughal Empire.

Several years later, the Om brothers were given titles for their services. These titles were Chowdhury, Rai and Lala. Kamakhya Om and Maheshnath Om both dug dighis in Satgaon valley which still exist today and are known as Kamur Dighi and Maheshnather Dighi respectively. There also remains in the area a large lake which was dug by Datta Khan.

From this family came another individual known as Nanda Kishore Rai. He lived in Bharaura and was a Sādhaka who was Shaivist by tradition. He was educated by Siddha Mahatma Purnananda Swami of Kamakhya Temple. The late 19th-century District Collector of Sylhet, James Sutherland Drummond, highly respected him. Eight days before his death, Rai informed Drummond that he would give up his service in favour of his paternal nephew. Rai was also a close associate of Siddha Kashinath of Nirmai Shib Bari. Kali Kishore Om wrote a book on the history of the Om family, which later came in the possession of Chandra Kumar Om.

Even before the 1950s, Navin Chandra Om Chowdhury of Bharaura had an intact relationship with the Tagore family of Jorasanko Thakur Bari. Chowdhury was a notable zamindar of Balishira pargana. He was married to Sukhamayi Om Chowdhury and had four sons, Narendra Om Chowdhury, Narmada Om Chowdhury, Nalini Kanta Om Chowdhury and Nishi Kanta Om Chowdhury.

== Bibliography ==
- Choudhury, Achyut Charan (1917). Srihattar Itibritta: Uttarrangsho (in Bengali) (first ed.). Kolkata: Kotha. pp. 252–53 – via Wikisource.
