= Bayazid of Sylhet =

Baro-Bhuiyan ruler of Sylhet (c. 1612)

Bayazid of Sylhet (died c. 1612?), also called Bayazid Karrani II, was a ruler in Sylhet during the early 17th century, in what is present-day Bangladesh. A prominent member of the Baro-Bhuiyan, Bayazid led military opposition against the Mughal Empire's expansion into eastern Bengal. His surrender following a sanguineous battle in 1612 ultimately resulted in their annexation of Sylhet.

== Background ==
At the time of the Mughal invasion of the region, Bayazid was among the most powerful leaders of the Eastern Afghan Confederates in Sylhet, independently ruling its eastern half with his capital in Pratapgarh. He has been identified as a member of the Karrani dynasty of Bengal, thus making him "Bayazid Karrani II", though historian Syed Murtaza Ali has suggested that he was identical to Sultan Bazid of the Pratapgarh Kingdom.

He was one of the most prominent members of the Baro-Bhuyan of his time, continuing the struggle against Mughal expansion of the previous generation under Isa Khan. Bayazid was among those who had been granted lands as part of the maintenance of this alliance by the latter's son, Musa Khan. Resistance against invasion into what is present-day Bangladesh in particular (and that of Sylhet especially) was headed both jointly and independently by Bayazid, Khwaja Usman of Usmangarh (and Taraf) and Anwar Khan of Baniachong. Bayazid had sheltered his close ally Khwaja Usman, when the latter was forced from his stronghold of Bokainagar in 1611.

== Battle against the Mughals ==
It was in light of this close alliance that Islam Khan I, the Mughal governor of Bengal, when initiating hostilities against Khwaja Usman in March 1612, also dispatched an imperial force against Bayazid so as to prevent the latter from providing aid. Ghiyas Khan was appointed to lead the expedition, though due to his diffidence, command was later entrusted to Shaikh Kamal. He was assisted by officers such as Mubariz Khan, Tuqmaq Khan, Mirak Bahadur Jalair and Mir Abdur Razzaq Shirazi. Mir Ali Beg was made the bakhshi (paymaster) of this Mughal command. The host consisted of four thousand matchlock-men, one thousand picked cavalry of Islam Khan I, one hundred imperial war elephants and the fleet of Musa Khan and his confederates, who had surrendered to the Mughals the previous year. Bayazid's side consisted of the forces sworn to him and his brother Yaqub, as well as several hill-tribe chieftains (likely Kukis).

Upon reaching the outskirts of Bayazid's domains, the Mughals launched a series of plundering raids with the intention of terrorising the inhabitants into submission, eventually arriving on the banks of the Surma River just outside the city of Sylhet. To challenge Shaikh Kamal's advance, Bayazid deputised his brother to lead a large contingent to the region and man the fort of Kadamtala. In turn, Shaikh Kamal dispatched Raja Satrajit to construct their own blockhouse fort on the Surma bank opposite, though throughout its construction, they faced continuous bombardment by cannon fire from Yaqub's men. Upon its completion and after a week of artillery fire, the Mughals were able to capture Kadamtala, forcing the Afghans to retreat. However, upon receiving considerable reinforcements from the Raja of Kachar, Bayazid and Yaqub resumed their hostilities, attacking the imperial fort to the result of a serious loss of life on both sides. The intense conflict continued, putting Shaikh Kamal in considerable difficulties. The Afghans reached such levels of confidence that they repeatedly sent messages offering to accept the Mughals' surrender: "we still promise you and all your comrades, great and small, a safe passage. If you desire your welfare, then come out of your fort and go you all back on foot to Islam Khan with your bare bodies, leaving all your elephants and equipments here."

However, when news was received of the defeat and death of Khwaja Usman, the Afghans were greatly demoralised, with their resistance collapsing and Bayazid quickly suing for peace. After initially sending Yaqub to treat with the Mughal command, Bayazid was instructed to go personally and offer his unconditional surrender. Shaikh Kamal met him with civility and offered him and his brother robes of honour as well as the promise of imperial favour. Thus assured, Bayazid surrendered his elephants to the Mughal general, who ordered Mubariz Khan and another subordinate to command the occupying soldiers and administration of Sylhet respectively. Soon after, Anwar Khan also submitted, thus bringing Sylhet for the first time under the control of the Mughal empire.

== Aftermath ==
Bayazid and his family were escorted by Shaikh Kamal to the court of Islam Khan in Dhaka, arriving by mid-April 1612. Khan received them from his Jharokha with greater pomp and grandeur than he had the relations of Khwaja Usman, who had also been taken to Dhaka a few days prior. Robes of honour and horses were later presented to Bayazid and his brothers, with a reception being held afterwards. Places were fixed for their residence, though they were deprived of their liberty and kept under close watch by trustworthy officers. When Emperor Jahangir ordered the presence of Bayazid and his family alongside Khwaja Usman's at the imperial court, the former group were escorted by Mutaqid Khan. While historian Abdul Karim states that nothing more is heard of Bayazid after this, Syed Murtaza Ali asserts that he was allowed by the Emperor to continue to rule Pratapgarh as a feudal lord, before dying soon after.

== Bibliography ==
- Ali, Syed Murtaza (1954). "A chronology of Muslim Faujdars of Sylhet". Proceedings of the Pakistan History Conference. Karachi: Pakistan Historical Society.
- Ali, Syed Murtaza (1965). হযরত শাহ জালাল ও সিলেটের ইতিহাস (in Bengali). Dhaka: Bangla Academy.
- Karim, Abdul (1992). History of Bengal: From the fall of Daud Karrani, 1576 to the death of Jahangir, 1627. Rajshahi: Institute of Bangladesh Studies, University of Rajshahi.
- Khan, Muazzam Hussain (2012). "Musa Khan". In Sirajul Islam; Miah, Sajahan; Khanam, Mahfuza; Ahmed, Sabbir (eds.). Banglapedia: the National Encyclopedia of Bangladesh (Online ed.). Dhaka, Bangladesh: Banglapedia Trust, Asiatic Society of Bangladesh. ISBN 984-32-0576-6. OCLC 52727562. OL 30677644M.
- Rizvi, S. N. H., ed. (1969). East Pakistan District Gazetteers: Dacca. East Pakistan Government Press. OCLC 153480.
- Rizvi, S. N. H., ed. (1970). East Pakistan District Gazetteers: Sylhet. East Pakistan Government Press. OCLC 153480.
- Roy, Atul Chandra (1968). History of Bengal: Mughal Period, 1526-1765 A.D. Calcutta: Nababharat Publishers.
- Saha, Sanghamitra (1998). A handbook of West Bengal. International School of Dravidian Linguistics. ISBN 9788185692241.
- Sarkar, Jadunath (1948). The History of Bengal. Vol. II (First ed.). Dacca: The University of Dacca.
- Tripathi, Ram Prasad (1960). Rise and Fall of the Mughal Empire. Allahabad: Central Book Depot.

Political offices
Preceded by Bengal Sultanate	Ruler of Sylhet	Succeeded by Mubariz Khan
