= Bokainagar Fort =

Fort in Bangladesh

- বোকাইনগর দুর্গ
- Bokainagar, Gauripur Upazila, Bangladesh

Site information
- Condition: Ruined

Site history
- Materials: Soil

Garrison information
- Occupants: Mughals (1611)

Bokainagar Fort is a ruined fort located in Gauripur Upazila, on the eastern bank of the Balua River, a tributary of the Brahmaputra River, 19.32 km east of present-day Mymensingh city. A tributary of the Balua River ran east–west through the fort. The fort was 1.60 km long and 0.80 km wide from east to west. The fort was protected by a high earthen wall and surrounded by a deep moat outside.

== History ==
No historical evidence has been found about the erecting Bokainagar fort. There are two legends about the construction of the fort. According to early tradition, a Koch tribal chieftain named 'Bokai' built the fort in the 15th century when the ancient Kamrup kingdom was fragmenting in small kingdoms. After death of Bokai, the fort was named after him. According to another legend, Majlis Khan Humayun, representative of Sultan Saifuddin Firuz Shah II (1486–1489), built the fort. In 1495, the fort came under the control of Hussain Shah and he appointed his son Nusrat Shah as its commander. Later Khwaja Usman fled from Orissa after being defeated by the Mughals and took refuge with Isa Khan and was established as the feudal lord of Bokainagar. He rebuilt the fort and established it as a strong military base and put up a strong resistance against the Mughals from here. He was finally defeated by Islam Khan in November 1611 and the fort came under Mughal possession. Mughals occupied the fort on 7 December 1611.

Khwaja Usman's residence was in the southwestern part of the fort. Khwaja Usman built a mosque and dug a pond inside the fort. Later Subedar Chand Roy dug another pond and built a temple in the fort.

== Remains ==
Remains of mosques, temples and ruins of Bokainagar Fort still exist. Today, numerous brick fragments, part of the south wall, and the ruined bastion.
