= Khwaja Usman =

Afghan chieftain in Bengal (died 1612)

Usman Khan
- Khwaja Osman Khan Lohani Miankhel

Chief of Eastern Afghan Confederates
- Reign: 1593–1612
- Predecessor: Khwaja Sulayman Khan Lohani
- Successor: Post abolished by Mughal Empire; Khwaja Mumriz Khan Lohani (de facto)
- Died: 12 March 1612; Daulambapur
- Burial: 12 March 1612; Uhar (Patanushar)
- Issue: Mumriz Khan, Yaqub Khan
Names
- Usman Khan Lohani Miankhel
Regnal name
- Khwaja Usman
- House: Miankhel (Lohani/Nohani)
- Father: Isa Khan Nohani Miankhel
- Religion: Sunni Islam
- Occupation: Warrior, Baro-Bhuyan chieftain

Khawāja Uthmān Khān Lōhānī (Bengali: খাজা উসমান খাঁন লোহানী), popularly known as Khwaja Usman, was an Afghan Sardar (chieftain) of Pathan Confederacy and warrior based in northeastern Bengal. As one of the Baro-Bhuyans, he was a zamindar ruling over the northern parts of Bengal, including Greater Mymensingh and later in South Sylhet. He was a formidable opponent to Man Singh I and the Mughal Empire, and was the last of the Afghan chieftains and rulers in Bengal. His defeat led to the surrender of all the remaining Pashtuns as well as the incorporation of the Sylhet region into the Bengal Subah. He is described as the most romantic figure in the history of Bengal. His biography can be found in the Baharistan-i-Ghaibi, Tuzk-e-Jahangiri as well as the Akbarnama.

== Early life ==
Usman Khan was born to an Afghan descent father, Khwaja Isa Khan, who belonged to the Miankhel clan of the Lohani tribe. His elder brother was Khwaja Sulayman, and his younger brothers were Wali, Malhi, and Ibrahim. Khwaja Isa Khan Lohani was the chief minister of the governor of Puri, Qutlu Khan Lohani, who was also Usman's uncle. Qutlu Khan Lohani was appointed to this role by the Sultan of Bengal, Sulaiman Khan Karrani, who was also a Pashtun. Collectively known as the Eastern Afghan Confederates, the Usmans belonged to an influential community that gave allegiance to the Delhi and Bengal Sultanates and opposed Mughal rule. The defeat of the sultanates led to the emergence of the Pathan Confederacy of Sylhet and Baro-Bhuyans of Bengal, a collection of independent chieftains who would unite in alliance to resist Mughal invasion. Following Qutlu's demise in 1590, there was rebellion among the Afghans. Nasir Khan Lohani had pledged allegiance to the Mughals. The governor of Bihar at the time, Man Singh I, defeated Nasir Lohani two years later due to his betrayal of the Mughal Empire. Khwaja Isa Khan Lohani succeeded Qutlu as the leader of the Eastern Afghan Confederates and reigned for five years. After his death, Usman's elder brother, Khwaja Sulayman Khan Lohani, took charge.

== Arrival in Bengal ==
Man Singh I later became the Subahdar of Bengal and attempted to weaken the influence of the Pashtuns. He gave Usman and Khwaja Sulaiman jagirs in Fatehabad in Bengal, thinking it would get them out of Orissa. Usman, his three brothers, and other Pashtuns started off for Bengal. After Singh realised the rising influence of rebels in Bengal due to Isa Khan's resistance against the Mughals, Singh cancelled the jagirs in order to stop more Pashtuns from migrating to Bengal. This cancellation angered Usman, leading to his invasion of South Bengal and capture of the fort in Satgaon. In 1593, Usman then continued east to Bhusna, where he defeated Chand ibn Kedar Rai on 11 February. Here, he formed an alliance with Isa Khan of Bhati, the leader of what was to become the Baro-Bhuyans. It is said that Usman also took shelter in Goyghor, South Sylhet, as he was hiding from Man Singh I, though this is unlikely as Usman entered Uhar much later.

== Rule in Bokainagar ==
Working alongside Isa Khan, Usman was able to gain control of Greater Mymensingh with his capital at Bokainagar. For a short period of time, the Eastern Afghan Confederates regained North Orissa too. After the death of Emperor Akbar in 1605, Usman was able to rebuild and develop Bokainagar Fort into a powerful military base consisting of 20,000 soldiers. Usman also established two other forts in Hasanpur and Yarasindur and took advantage of the Brahmaputra River to separate himself from the Mughal territory in the west. He employed the Om brothers, a Hindu family from Khaliajuri, who assisted him in his missions.

In 1596, Usman defeated Chand Rai of Sripur. He crossed the Brahmaputra in winter 1607, where he defeated the Mughal thanadars of Alapsingh, (Note: Alapsingh was a pargana constituting the modern-day upazilas of Fulbaria, Muktagacha and Trishal) Sajawal Khan, and Baz Bahadur Qalmaq. Sajawal was killed, and Qalmaq fled to Bhawal. This news came to Man Singh I, who immediately set off from Dacca, and a day later battled Usman on the banks of the Banar River. Many of Usman's weapons and resources were looted in this battle, as well as the deaths of many Afghans. After the death of Isa Khan, his son, Musa Khan, rose to power. The plans of the insurgents were to launch an attack on the Mughal Empire and attempt to free Musa Khan and once again liberate Bhati.

In 1606, Musa Khan, his brother Mahmud Khan, and other rebels surrendered to the Mughal Subahdar of Bengal, Islam Khan I. Other than Musa Khan, the other rebels were made to join the Mughal force travelling to Bokainagar to defeat Usman; who had now become the main target of the Empire. Anwar Khan, a former rebel ruling Baniachong, surrendered to Islam Khan I and said that he would aid the Mughals in defeating Usman as long as he can keep Baniachong. Islam Khan I initially accepted but later lost trust for Anwar, who in anger, marched from Jahangirnagar to Yarasindur. Anwar Khan came across Musa's brother Mahmud Khan and Bahadur Ghazi of Bhawal and made a new plot to fight the Mughals to support Usman.

In October of the same year, Islam Khan appointed Shaykh Abdul Wahid and Shaykh Kamal Bayazid to march with a large army from Jahangirnagar to Hasanpur (Haybatnagar), which was just north of Usman's capital in Bokainagar. From Hasanpur, the Mughal army built a new fort every five days as they moved closer to Bokainagar.

Usman and his forces would often launch surprise attacks at the fort-builders. When the Mughal camp pitched themselves at the eleventh fort, Usman and the Afghans came to oppose the Mughals and an affray took place with one of Usman's men, Tatar Khan Naghir, being killed. At the eighteenth fort, Usman appeared with a small army to attack them once more. Shaykh Kamal ordered his troops not to respond and attempted to stop people from leaving the fort, however many were tempted and left the fort to fight Usman. The Mughals attained a victory by making use of the cannons at their fort and Usman's forces were heavily defeated; fleeing back to Bokainagar for safety. The Mughals continue their fort-building campaign.

== Taraf and Usmangarh ==
After the Mughals had completed their nineteenth fort, they took a break with the approach of the Islamic month of Ramadan in which they would observe fasting. Usman was informed that his allies, Dariya Khan Pani and Nasir Khan of Tajpur, had surrendered and joined the Mughal forces. Some Pashtuns of Tajpur followed their leaders and expressed support of the Mughals, while others joined Usman. With Usman's support from other chieftains decreasing, Usman and 250 Afghans evacuated their capital at Bokainagar; fleeing eastwards towards Greater Sylhet. The Mughals were busy with Eid al-Fitr celebrations on 7 December 1611, when they heard that Usman had fled Bokainagar. Immediately following the Eid prayers, the Mughals marched to Bokainagar where they stopped to await new commands and tactics following the unexpected fleeing of Usman.

The Sylhet region had the strongest Afghan insurgency in Bengal and Usman built alliances with the many Afghan chiefs there such as Anwar Khan of Baniachong, Bayazid Karrani II of Sylhet and Mahmud Khan. However, Anwar Khan of Baniachong had hopelessly surrendered in battle against Raja Satrajit of Bhusna; later being imprisoned and made blind.

Usman reached Taraf where he appointed his son, Khwaja Mumriz, and brother, Khwaja Malhi to station themselves. Governing there, they established a lofty fort. Khwaja Wali was also stationed at a hill fort called Putia (Putijuri) on the foot of the Giripal in Bahubal. Usman then continued and reached the Ita Kingdom ruled by Raja Subid Narayan who he defeated in a battle. He then established his new capital in Uhar and managed to gain control of South Sylhet. Uhar came to be known as Usmangarh and Taraf also encompassed Usman's domain. Usman gifted the valleys near Pargana Satgaon to the Hindu Om family, who had aided him in defeating Subid Narayan.

It is said a force was sent to Cachar from Taraf at an attempt to invade Manipur. In a campaign led by Haji Shamsuddin Baghdadi and the three brothers, Mirza Saqi, Baqi and Pattani, the Eastern Afghan Confederates at Taraf were defeated in a battle compared by the Baharistan-i-Ghaibi to the Day of Resurrection. Defeated in a fourth assault, the Afghans fled to Khwaja Usman at Uhar leading to the Mughal annexation of Taraf. Uhar had become Usman's final territory.

== Final battle and death ==
The Mughals sent a messenger to Usman advising him to surrender and be loyal to the Mughal Empire. Usman replied to this message saying that he would like to make peace as long as he can tranquilly rule in Uhar, a place not yet conquered by the Mughal Empire. Not content with Usman's reply, Islam Khan I prepared a large army for another expedition to defeat Usman and annex Uhar. Mughal emperor Jahangir appointed Shajaat Khan Chisti as the commander of the operation.

However, Islam Khan I was keen to end Afghan power in Bengal and decided to commence the battle. He readied 500 of his own cavalry, 4,000 musketeers and large numbers of war horses and war elephants. Shona Ghazi of Sarail provided warships and Ihtimam Khan assembled an imperial force. Shaykh Achha and Iftikhar Khan Turkmen were placed on the wings. On 4 February 1612, the army reached Taraf and then Putia/Tupia. Khwaja Wali abandoned his Putia hill-fort before facing the approaching army, fleeing to Usman at Uhar.

After the arrival of Malhi, Mumriz and Wali, Usman also prepared for war and allied with the local Sarhangs. He readied 2000 of his own cavalry, 5,000 infantry, and 40 war elephants. Usman was known for his tup-o-tufang style artillery. On his left, he appointed his brother Khwaja Wali with 1000 cavalry, 2000 infantry, and 30 war elephants. On his right, Usman appointed his slave Shir Maydan with 700 cavalry, 1000 infantry and 20 war elephants. Usman appointed his nephew Khwaja Dawud and his brothers Khwaja Malhi and Khwaja Ibrahim on the vanguard with 1500 cavalry, 2000 infantry and 50 war elephants. In two marches, Usman's army travelled from Uhar to the nearby village of Daulambapur in March 1612. (Note: Dawlambapur is a village in Pargana Chawallis, Moulvibazar District that is just north of the Hail Haor.) They camped one and a half kos away from the Mughals and tactically entrenched themselves in a nullah bank (jalah marsh). When Shajaat Khan heard of this, he positioned an artillery battery fastened to the areca catechu trees that were opposite of Usman's marsh. This move made the two armies only one-half kos away from each other.

Iftikhar Khan Turkmen approached Shajaat and pleaded him to once more send a peace message to Usman, who was a fellow Muslim. Shajaat agreed and another message was sent to Usman via Shihab Khan Lodi, one of Iftikhar's officers and an Afghan just like Usman. Usman was offered a chance to become a mansabdar of 5000 and be completely pardoned, if he personally submits himself to Emperor Jahangir, sends them all his tuskers and one of his sons or brothers as hostage in addition to paying them rent. Usman was infuriated by the message and Shihab returned to Shajaat. Shihab Khan Lodi also discovered a safe passage which was useful in the upcoming battle. Usman made all his flags and elephant banners a similar colour to the Mughals as tactic to confuse them in battle.

The next morning on 12 March 1612, the battle commenced. The Mughals were close to securing an swift victory but Mirza Bey Aymaq had mistakenly exclaimed that Usman's army were on the right side. The Mughal vanguard turned right except the groups under Kishwar Khan (left command), Miran Sayyid Husayni, Sayyid Adam and Shona Ghazi. Some of Usman's infantry crossed to the Mughal side of the marsh and they were met by Shaykh Achha, Sabit Khan and Mustafa. This caused confusion among the Mughal artillery who started firing from every side. Shaykh Achha was killed by being shot on the back, and Sabit and Mustafa fled the spot. Iftikhar Khan Turkmen had also led 42 cavalry and 14 infantry to attack Usman's infantry who had crossed the marsh. However, a Mughal elephant called Ranasingar started attacking one of Iftikhar's elephants, and to avoid any more accidents Iftikhar's soldiers did not follow him. Left on his own, Iftikhar crossed Shihab's safe passage and launched himself on Khwaja Wali. Usman intercepted the affray, saving Wali from Iftikhar and was said to have rebuked Wali and called him a child. Usman, sitting on the howdah of an elephant, then proceeded with some of his infantry with Bakhta (a famous elephant which Jahangir calls Gajpat) at the front. At this moment, the Mughal driver of Ranasingar managed to calm Ikftikhar's other elephant and crossed the marsh to aid Iftikhar. Many of Iftikhar's soldiers were killed by Usman's and Usman's forces encircled and cut the drivers into pieces. The central force, led by Shajaat Khan, was then defeated although Shajaat managed to escape.

Just as the defeat of the Mughals seemed certain, Iftikhar Khan's devoted soldier, Sheikh Abdul Jalil, rode his horse towards Usman. Both of them aimed their crossbows at each other and fired. An arrow hit Usman's left eye, striking through his brain as Usman shot Abdul Jalil's chest. Usman tried to pull the arrow out of his eye, causing his right eye to come out too. Usman became blind and covered himself with a handkerchief. He gestured his elephant driver, Umar, to find and attack Shajaat. Umar, who did not realise the condition of his chief, told Usman that Shajaat is near the Mughal flag under the Mahua tree. Usman, no longer able to speak, tapped Umar's back as a gesture to proceed towards Shajaat. Fighting continued throughout the day, with Usman's other soldiers not knowing of their chief's condition. Usman died later, after also losing his speech.

Usman's family and the Sarhangs brought his dead body back to Uhar and buried it at an unmarked spot between two hills. A false tomb was also created outside Usman's palace. Usman was succeeded as chief by his elder son Khwaja Mumriz, who was then pressured into relinquishing power to his uncle, Khwaja Wali. He sent his minister Wali Mandu Khel and Usman's youngest son Khwaja Yaqub to notify Shajaat of Usman's death and to offer surrender. The Mughals honoured Usman's relatives and the surrendered Afghans with gifts and a feast.

== Legacy ==
In 2009, the Prothom Alo reported that Usmangarh (Usman's estate) and its adjoining hills which were considered government land were being taken over by land-grabbers. The illegal occupiers had built shops and planted trees in the governmental territory but were not prosecuted due to their close links with the Awami League - Bangladesh's ruling political party. 30% of the land, including Usman's fort, was said to have been illegally occupied by local Awami League member Jamshed Miah. Other occupiers included Sundar Ali, Alta Miah, Durud Miah, Faruq Miah and Mubasshir Ali who were accused of opening shops and digging hills in the area.

In 2017, Khwaja Usman's tomb was finally marked and identified with official recognition at 10pm on 17 May 2017 in the village of Usmangarh in Patanushar. The area of the fort and nearby hills are in close proximity to the Tilagarh Primary School playground. Located in the western part of Usman's estate, the tomb was restored by the Bir Pathan Khwaja Osman Khan Memorial Implementation Council. Many notable individuals were present at the inauguration such as Usman's descendant Mawlana Ghazi Muhammad Sirajul Islam Suruki Lohani who was the President of the named Council. Others present were Shuaybur Rahman (a successor of Fultoli) and Shaykh Muhammad Misir Mian (a noted freedom fighter). The Goyghor Mosque in Moulvibazar is also named after Usman as the Historical Khwaja's Mosque.

Political offices
Preceded by	Ruler of Bokainagar; 1612–1616	Succeeded by
Preceded by Raja Subid Narayan	Ruler of Taraf and Usmangarh; 1610-1612	Succeeded by Mubariz Khan

== See also ==
- History of Sylhet
