= Ibrahim Khan Fath-i-Jang =

Mughal Subahdar of Bengal from 1617 to 1624

14th Subahdar of Bengal
- In office 1617 – 20 April 1624
- Monarch: Jahangir
- Preceded by: Muhtashim Khan
- Succeeded by: Mahabat Khan

Personal details
- Died: 20 April 1624 Bhagalpur, Bengal, Mughal Empire
- Parent(s): Mirza Ghiyas Beg (father); Asmat Begum (mother)
- Relatives: Abu'l-Hasan Asaf Khan (brother), Nur Jahan (sister), Khvajeh Mohammad-Sharif (grandfather)

Mirza Ibrahim Beg (Persian: میرزا ابراهیم بیگ), later known as Ibrahim Khan Fath-i-Jang (Persian: ابراهیم خان فتح جنگ; d. 1624) was the Subahdar of Bengal during the reign of Mughal emperor Jahangir. He was the brother of Empress Nur Jahan who was the wife of Emperor Jahangir.

== Biography ==
Born to a Shi'ite family, Khan was the son of Mirza Ghiyas Beg. His uncle, Muhammad-Tahir, was a learned man who composed poetry under the pen name of Wasli. Ibrahim Khan's father was a native of Tehran, and was the youngest son of Khvajeh Mohammad-Sharif. Ibrahim Khan served as a veteran in Akbar's reign. Qasim Khan Chishti's failure in military expeditions resulted in Ibrahim being appointed the next governor of Mughal Bengal in 1617, during the reign of Jahangir. In 1620, the Maghs of Arakan attacked the Bengali capital of Jahangirnagar (Dhaka). In response, Khan defeated them and captured 400 Magh war boats. This part of Dhaka continues to be known as Maghbazar. During his term, he also freed the Baro-Bhuiyan chief Musa Khan and his allies. It is said that Ibrahim Khan appointed Dilal Khan as Dhaka's naval commander.

He died on 20 April 1624 in an attack by the rebellious prince Shah Jahan. He was buried in a tomb in Bhagalpur.

== See also ==
- List of rulers of Bengal
- History of Bengal
- History of Bangladesh
- History of India

Preceded by Qasim Khan Chishti	Subahdar of Bengal; 1617–1624	Succeeded by Mahabat Khan
