= Egarosindur =

Coordinates: 24.260°N 90.661°E

Egarasindur এগারসিন্দুর
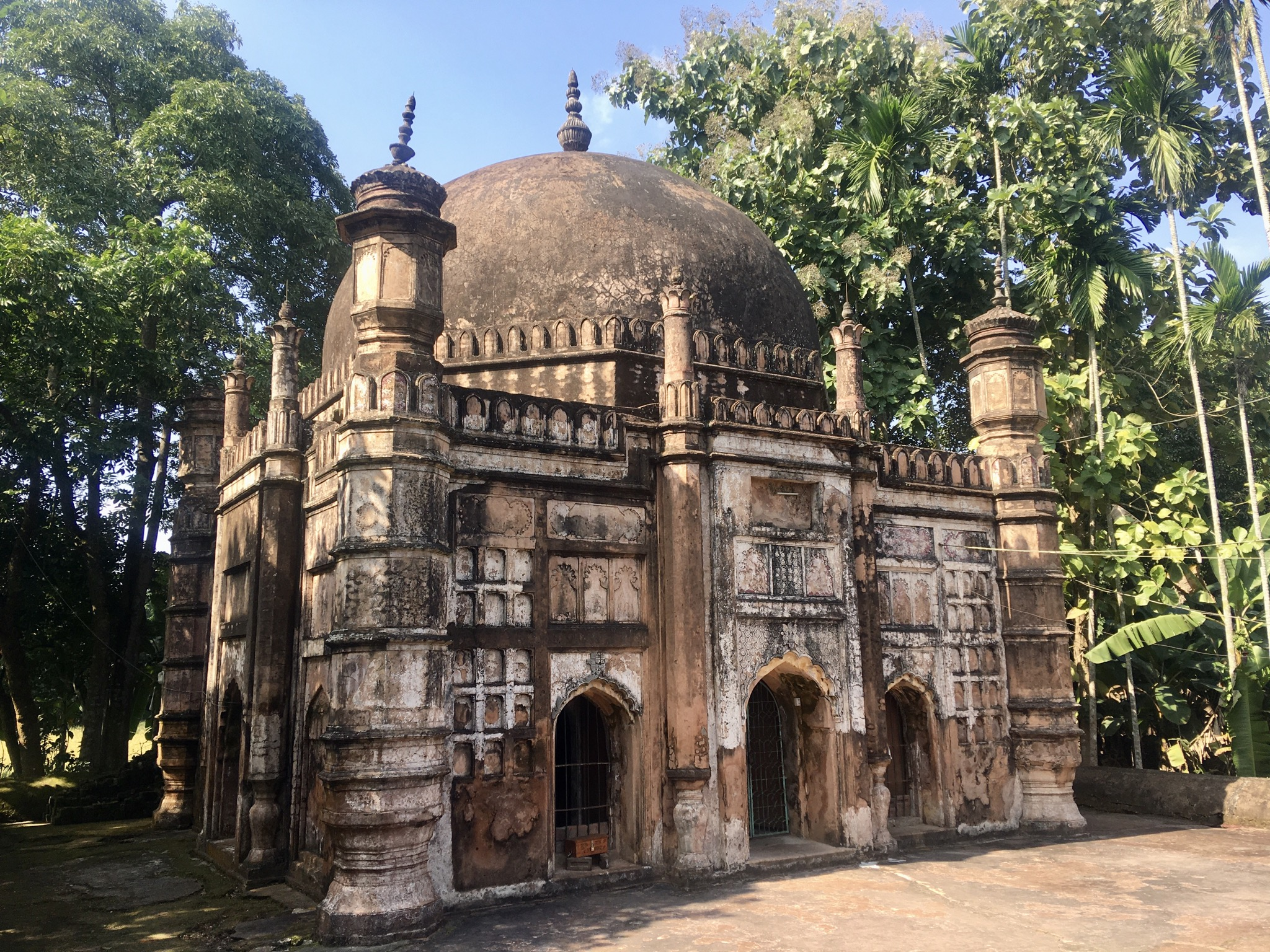
- Sheikh Mahmud Shah Mosque, Egarosindur
- Interactive map of Egarasindur
- Country: Bangladesh
- Division: Dhaka
- District: Kishoreganj

Egarasindur, and historically Yarasindur, is a village in Pakundia Upazila, Kishoreganj District, Dhaka Division, Bangladesh, on the east side of the Brahmaputra River. It is in the western part of the division, about 85 km from Dhaka by road. The village is mentioned in the Akbarnama by Abu'l-Fazl ibn Mubarak. Historians argue about the history of Egarosindur. It was believed to have been settled about 1000 BCE, and archaeological finds include silver coins, iron axes, lances, bows and arrows. At that time, the village was a commercial center.

During the eighth century CE, it was a river port where Muslims traded with Rome and Persia. In 1338 Fakhruddin Mubarak Shah took control of the region, followed by Firuz Shah Tughlaq. In 1577, Isa Khan proclaimed independence for Egarosindur as a trading center. At this time a battle took place at the Fort of Egarosindur between Isa Khan and Man Singh I, Akbar's general, in which Isa Khan was victorious. After the death of In 1638, during the reign of Shah Jahan, Egarosindur was attacked and the fort destroyed, which is still visible upon visiting the site.

== Legacy of the Baro-Bhuyan ==
Even after the end of the era of the Baro-Bhuyan and Zamindars, an old family, the Khondokers, is still thriving and carrying on the historic legacy. The Khondokers were first islamic scholars and later turned taluqdars/tax collectors for the Baro-Bhuyans.

== Archaeology ==
Notable structures include the fort, the Shah Mosque (dating to 1680), the Sadi Mosque, and the cemetery.

== Healthcare ==
Egarosindur has a modern Egarosindur community hospital, serving all the surrounding villages. The hospital was founded on the land donated by local philanthropist Aftab Uddin Khondoker and his children. The hospital is charity based and dedicated to serve under privileged rural communities. It was built in join cooperative by SOLS and Nari Uddug Kendra (NUK).

== Notable Person ==
The small historical village has produced Mashuda Khatun Shefali, a prominent Bangladeshi women's rights activist, social entrepreneur, and gender expert. She is the founder and executive director of the Nari Uddug Kendra (NUK), a leading non-governmental organization established in 1991 dedicated to women's empowerment. She is also a life long Asoka Foundation fellow as well as Senior Synergos fellow.

== See also ==
- List of villages in Bangladesh
- Pakundia Adarsha Mohila College
