= Qasim Khan Chishti =

Mughal Subahdar of Bengal from 1613 to 1617

Muhtashim Khan
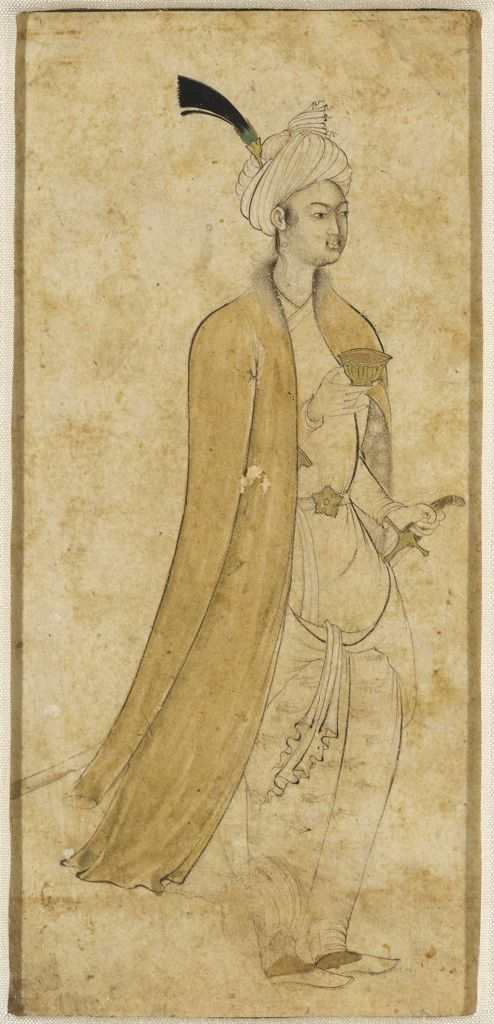

13th Subahdar of Bengal
- In office 4 May 1613 – 1617
- Monarch: Jahangir
- Preceded by: Islam Khan I
- Succeeded by: Ibrahim Khan I

Personal details
- Born: Qasim Khan Chishti c. 1573
- Died: c. 1620 Jahangirnagar, Bengal, Mughal Empire
- Resting place: Jama Masjid, Uttar Pradesh, India
- Parent: Shaikh Badruddin Chisti
- Relatives: Salim Chishti (grandfather); Islam Khan I (brother); Qutubuddin Koka (cousin)
- Occupation: Mughal Governor

Qasim Khan Chishti (reigned: May 1613 – 1617) was the Subahdar of Bengal during the reign of emperor Jahangir. He was the younger brother and the successor of Islam Khan Chisti. He was entitled Muhtashim Khan.

== Military career ==
Qasim Khan led several failed military expeditions against neighboring regions. In 1615, he rather led expeditions and took control against local chieftains (Bara-Bhuiyans) - Bir Hambir, Shams Khan, Bahadur Khan and Birbahu, the zamindars of Birbhum, Pachet, Hijli, and Chandrakona respectively. During his reign, he faced a combined attack of Arakanese and Portuguese forces. Because of a rift between these forces, Qasim Khan managed to thwart the expedition. He failed another military initiative against Assam.

By 1615, Min Khamaung of Arakan attacked Bhulua, but was personally captured after a loss in the battlefield. The local governor of Bhulua released him in exchange for various resources Qasim Khan found this humane but unstatesmanlike and sought to take the opportunity to subjugate Arakan. Accordingly, Qasim Khan built up an army and sent an expedition in February 1616 to take Chittagong back from Arakan. The forced launched a quick and early siege that - with superior Mughal siege weaponry and firepower - seemed poised to take Chittagong before the Arakanese army could arrive. However, dissent amongst the ranks stemming from a personal officer of the subhadar being the commander of mostly imperial forces. The Arakanese recovered the strength with reinforcements who defend the city and cut off food supply lines.

Because of his incompetency in this expedition, he was withdrawn from the governorship of Bengal and was replaced by Ibrahim Khan Fath-i-Jang in 1617.

Preceded by Islam Khan Chishti	Subahdar of Bengal; 1614–1617	Succeeded by Ibrahim Khan Fath-i-Jang

== See also ==
- List of rulers of Bengal
- History of Bengal
- History of Bangladesh
- History of India
