= Undivided Sylhet district =

Pre-Independence district of India

Sylhet (1765–1947)
- Part of Bengal Presidency (1765–1874); Part of North-East Frontier (1874–1905); Part of Eastern Bengal and Assam (1905–1912); Part of Assam Province (1912–1947)
- 1765–1947
- Capital: Sylhet
- History
  - Part of Bengal Presidency: 1765
  - Transfer to North-East Frontier: 1874
  - Transfer to Eastern Bengal and Assam: 1905
  - Bifurcation of Eastern Bengal and Assam: 1912
  - Partition of India: 15 August 1947
Preceded by	Succeeded by
Bengal Subah	Sylhet; Karimganj
- Today part of: Bangladesh; India

The Undivided Sylhet district is a former administrative district of Assam Province (now Assam) of British India. It was formerly governed as part of Bengal Presidency until 1874, before its transfer to Assam. During the Partition of India in 1947, the ertswhile district was partitioned into Sylhet Division of then East Bengal (then in Pakistan), now part of Bangladesh and Karimganj district which remained as a part of Barak Valley region in Assam.

== History ==
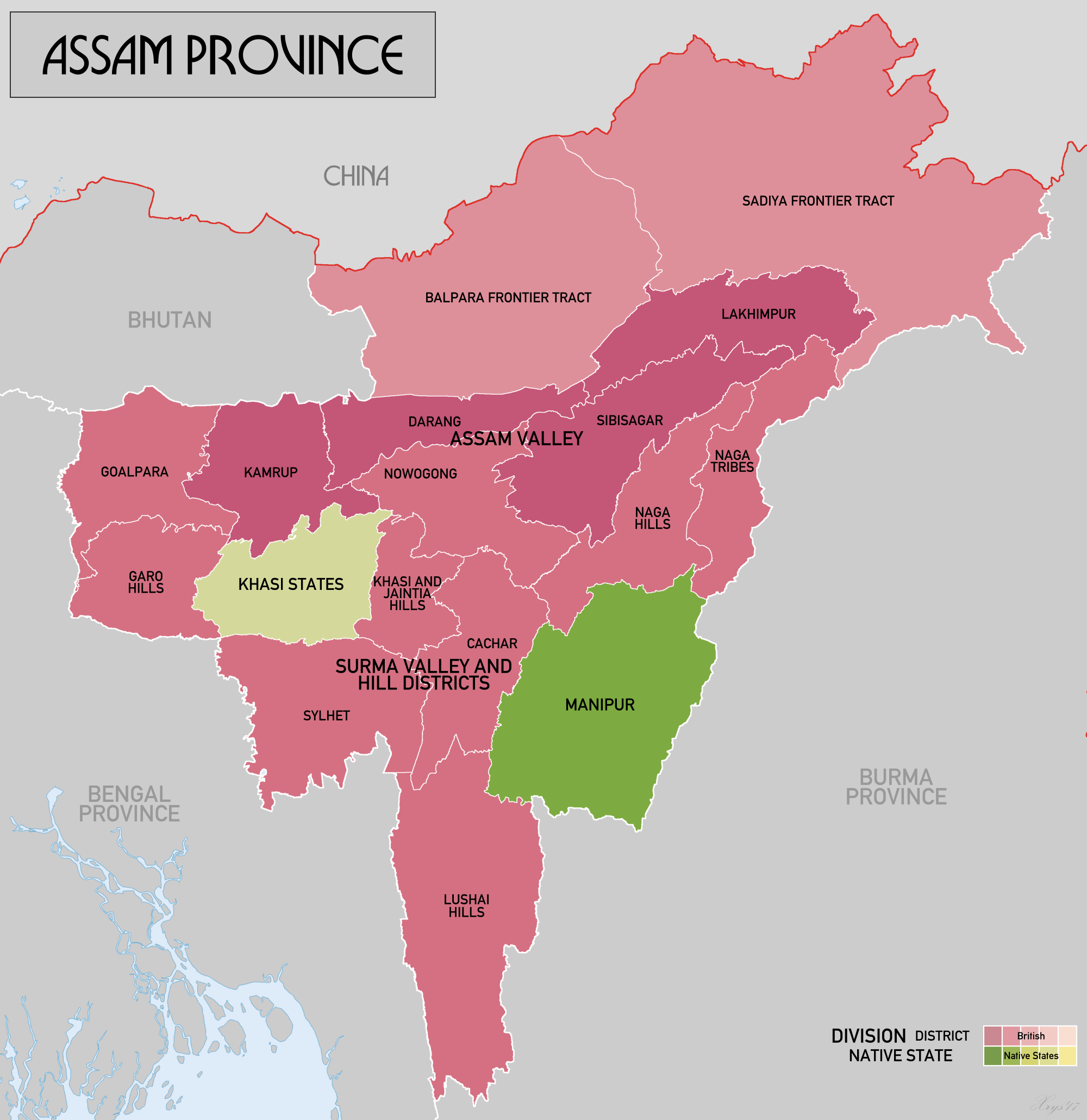
Sylhet district as part of Assam Province in 1936

=== Transfer to Assam Province ===
During the British Raj, Sylhet was governed as a part of Bengal until 1874. In September 1874, Sylhet was separated from the Bengal Presidency and added to the new Assam province. The people of Sylhet protested the decision of the region's transfer to Assam by submitting a memorandum to the Viceroy. Later the protests subsided when the Viceroy, Lord Northbrook, visited Sylhet and announced that the education and justice would be administered from Bengal, and the opportunities of employment for tea estates and their produce in Assam in order to facilitate the province's commercial development..

Sylhet temporarily reverted to Bengal during the Partition of Bengal in 1905, when it became part of the province of Eastern Bengal and Assam. The partition was annulled in 1911, and the boundaries of Assam Province was restored in 1912.

=== Partition of Sylhet in 1947 ===
During the partition of India in 1947, a referendum was held to determine whether the Sylhet region would remain in India or join Pakistan. The four subdivisions (North Sylhet, South Sylhet, Habiganj and Sunamganj) joined the Dominion of Pakistan; subsequently forming East Bengal's Sylhet Division.

Meanwhile, Abdul Matlib Mazumdar led a delegation advocating for the region to remain with India, due to which the district's Karimganj subdivision remained in India, as part of the state of Assam.
