= Restoration of Min Saw Mon =

Conflicts in Arakan (1429)

Reconquest of Arakan
Date	February – 18 April 1429
Location	Arakan
Result	Bengal-Arakanese victory
Territorial changes	Mrauk U became a vassal state of Bengal

Belligerents
Bengal Sultanate	Ava Kingdom; Hanthawaddy kingdom

Commanders and leaders
Jalaluddin Muhammad Shah; Wali Khan; Min Saw Mon (Suleiman Shah)	Minkhaung; Binnya Ran I

The restoration of Min Saw Mon was a military campaign led by the Bengal Sultanate to help Min Saw Mon regain control of his Launggyet Dynasty. The campaign was successful. Min Saw Mon was restored to the Launggyet throne, and Arakan became a vassal state of the Bengal Sultanate.

== Background ==
In 1406, Burmese forces from the Kingdom of Ava invaded Arakan. The control of Arakan was part of the Forty Years' War between Ava and Hanthawaddy Pegu on the Burmese mainland. The control of Arakan would change hands a few times before Hanthawaddy forces drove out Ava forces in 1412. Ava would retain a toehold in northern Arakan until 1416/17 but did not try to retake Arakan. The Hanthawaddy influence ended after King Razadarit's death in 1421. (Note: (Phayre 1873: 120): Razadarit's three sons vied for the throne. None of them claimed Arakan.)

The former Arakanese ruler Min Saw Mon received asylum in the Bengal Sultanate and lived there in Pandua for 24 years. Saw Mon became close to the Bengal Sultan Jalaluddin Muhammad Shah, serving as a commander in the king's army. Saw Mon convinced the sultan to help restore him to his lost throne.

== Invasion ==
In 1429, Saw Mon aided by troops "largely made up of Afghan adventurers" invaded Arakan. The first attempt at the invasion failed because Saw Mon got into an argument with Gen. Wali Khan of Bengal, and was imprisoned by the general. Saw Mon escaped, and the sultan agreed to another attempt. The second invasion went well. Saw Mon was proclaimed king at Launggyet on 18 April 1429 (Thursday, 1st waning of Kason 791 ME).

== Aftermath ==
Saw Mon finally regained control of the Arakanese throne in 1430 with military assistance from Bengali commanders Wali Khan and Sindhi Khan. He later founded a new royal capital, Mrauk U. His kingdom would become known as the Mrauk U Kingdom. Arakan became a vassal state of the Bengal Sultanate and recognized Bengali sovereignty over some territory of northern Arakan. In recognition of his kingdom's vassal status, the kings of Arakan received Islamic titles, despite being Buddhists, and legalized the use of Islamic gold dinar coins from Bengal within the kingdom. The kings compared themselves to Sultans and employed Muslims in prestigious positions within the royal administration. Saw Mon, now styled as Suleiman Shah died in 1433, and was succeeded by his younger brother Min Khayi.

The subordinate relationship with Bengal did not last long. Sultan Jalaluddin Muhammad Shah died in 1433, and was succeeded by a string of weak sultans. In 1437, Khayi took over the throne of Sandoway (Thandwe), unifying the Arakan coast, probably for the first time in history. He also married Saw Yin Mi, the queen of Sandoway. Then, Khayi occupied Ramu, the southernmost territory of his erstwhile overlord Bengal. The Arakanese chronicles say that Khayi successfully seized Chittagong in 1450. However, the first confirmed successful occupation of Chittagong came only nine years later in 1459 when King Ba Saw Phyu seized the port from Sultan Rukunuddin Barbak Shah.
