= Saw Sit II =

Saw Sit of Mrauk-U စောစစ်

Chief queen consort of Arakan
- Tenure: April 1404 - 29 November 1406
- Coronation: April 1404
- Predecessor: Saw Mar La III
- successor: Saw Pyei Chantha (Ava's vassal)

Chief queen consort of Arakan
- Tenure: May 1429 - 9 May 1433
- Coronation: August/September 1430
- Predecessor: (new office)
- successor: Saw Pa-Ba
- Born: 1383/84 745 ME; Launggyet
- Died: 1450s? Mrauk U
- Spouse: Min Saw Mon (1404-1406/1429-1433)
- Issue: Min Mon Thin (son); Saw Pu Shwe (daughter); Saw Pyo II (daughter)
Names
- Hmauk Taw Min Mon Mibaya Saw Sit မှောက်တော် မင်းမွန် မိဖုရား စောစစ်
- House: Alawmaphyu
- Father: unknown
- Mother: Saw Thamar II
- Religion: Therevada Buddhism

Saw Sit of Mrauk-U (Arakanese:စောစစ်; was the first queen of the Mrauk U Dynasty of Arakan and last chief queen consort of the Launggyet Dynasty of Arakan.

Since foundation of Mrauk U, she was known as the Hmauk Taw Min Mon Mibara (မှောက်တော် မင်းမွန် မိဖုရား, "Queen Saw Mon of the Western Gate). She was married to King Saw Mon, who was the last king of Launggyet before its conquest by the Burmans and the first king of Mrauk U after its the restoration of the Arakanese throne.

== Early life ==
The princess was likely born around during 1380s in the royal capital, Launggyet. Her ancestry likely descended from King Min Hti through his first queen Saw Sit I of Launggyet, who had 3 children together with her. Saw Sit II is likely to be great granddaughter of Saw Sit I.

== Marriage to Min Saw Mon ==
Princess Saw Sit married the Prince Narameikhla on April 1404 of their coronation in the royal palace.

After 23 years exile of King Saw Mon from Bengal. During their reunion, she already been living with a peaseant husband whom characterized by her brother. Saw Mon didn't hesitate to send her lover to the frontier forests of Mrauk U.

== Bibliography ==
- Sandamala Likara, Ashin (1931). Raza Razawinthit Kyan (in Arakanese). Vol. 1-2 pg.18-22 (1997-1999 ed.). Rangoon: Tetlan Sarpay.
- U Uar Nha, Sarataw (1930s). Dhanywaddy Razawin Thit. Vol. 2 pg. 342 (2017-language= Arakanese ed.). Yangon.
