= Saw Yin Mi =

Queen of Sandoway

Saw Yin Mi စောယင်မိ

Queen regnant of Sandoway
- Reign: 1420s – 1437
- Successor: Monarchy abolished

Queen of the Central Palace of Arakan
- Tenure: 1437 – 1459
- Predecessor: Established
- Successor: vacant
- Born: c. 1390s Sandoway
- Died: c. 1460s Mrauk U
- Spouse: Thon Ywa-Za (1410s–1436); Min Khayi (1437–1459)
- Issue: Saw Yandameit; Baya Minye
- House: Launggyet
- Religion: Therevada Buddhism

Saw Yin Mi (Burmese: စောယင်မိ), was a queen regnant of Sandoway from the 1420s until 1437 when it was annexed by newly formed Mrauk U Kingdom. She later she married King Khayi, the second king of Mrauk U, and became the queen consort of the central place of Arakan.

She is one of the few queens in Arakanese history that held the title of queen regnant.

Following the exile of King Saw Mon and the collapsed of Launggyet Dynasty, Arakan was divided into two political factions of Launggyet and the Sandoway.

After her husband died, she reigned in his stead as his widow. Because one of her two sons killed the other and seized power, she offered Sandoway to the King of Mrauk U in 1437, and became his middle queen consort.
