= Razathu II =

King of Arakan from 1394 to 1401

Razathu II of Launggyet ရာဇသူ ၂

King of Arakan
- Reign: 1394 - 1395 AD
- Coronation: 1394 AD
- Predecessor: Thinhse of Arakan
- Successor: Sithabin II
- Reign: 1397 - 1401 AD
- Coronation: 1397 AD
- Predecessor: Myinhseingyi
- Successor: Theinkhathu
- Born: 1359 CE; Launggyet
- Died: 1401 CE (aged 42); Launggyet
- Consort: Saw Nyet Htwa; Saw Hla Mway
- Issue: Min Saw Mon; Min Khayi; Saw Pan Tu (daughter)
Regnal name
- Wara Dhamma Razathu-ဝရဓမ္မရာဇာသူ မင်းကြီး
- House: Alawmaphyu
- Father: Thinhse of Arakan
- Mother: Saw May-Phwar (စောမယ်ဖွား)
- Religion: Therevada Buddhism

Razathu II (Arakanese: ရာဇသူ; was the 13th and 16th King of Launggyet Dynasty of Arakan, from 1394 to 1395 and again from 1397 to until his death in 1401.

== Brief ==
King Thinhse (သိဥ္စည်း) made a raid into the Burmese territory. He and his infant son Prince Razathu with his armies marched into launching campaign against the Ava Kingdom in late 1394 (756 ME), but during his absence, Sithabin II, Governor of Sandoway revolted and seizing the King's naval boats conveyed along the sea coast. Were now left on the shore for his return. The Rebellious governor made the best of his way to Launggret, where he sets up the king's son, Razathu. The King return without delay, but his army was deserting him and he was unexpectedly killed on his journey back to the capital.

Prince Razathu II, who now proclaimed the throne. Within one year after his reign was disturbed by royal conspiracies made by the Court related to the death of his father, the king was deposed by Thandwe governor (သံတွဲစားစည်သဘင်) who usurped the throne with the assistance of Talaings. Now long after he sent Razathu to southern extremity of the Kingdom. Where the exiled king lived for 2 years located in present town of Kyeintali along with his wife. The usurped ruler was eventually again usurped by another minister, Myinhseingyi who agained eventually deposed and had to fly to the Burmese dominions.

Deposed Razathu was now restored to the throne in 1397 and ruled for 4 years, was succeeded by his younger brother.

== Death ==
The King died in 1401, he was aged 42.

Preceded by Thinhse of Arakan, Myinhseingyi	13th King of Launggyet; 1394 - 1395, 1397 - 1401	Succeeded by Sithabin II, Theinkhathu
