= Nyidaw Temple =

Buddhist temples in Rakhine State

Nyi Taw Temple
- ညီတော် ပုထိုးတော်
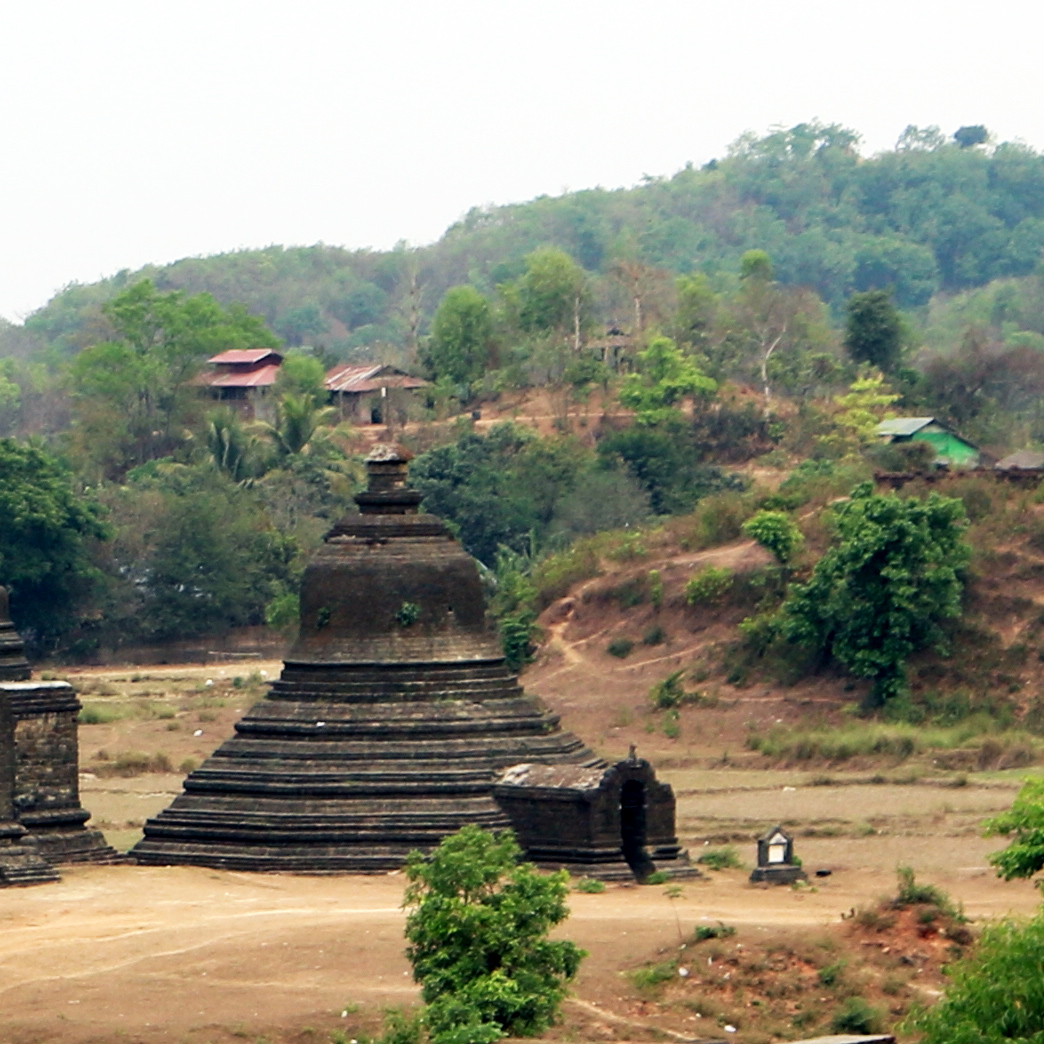
- Nyi Taw Temple

- Location within Myanmar

Religion
- Affiliation: Theravada Buddhism

Location
- Location: Mrauk U, Rakhine State
- Country: Myanmar
- Interactive map of Nyi Taw Temple
- Coordinates: 20.598692°N 93.190818°E

Architecture
- Founder: King Min Khayi
- Completed: 1433 CE

Nyi Taw Temple is a temple in Mrauk U, Myanmar. It was built by Min Khayi, the second king of Mrauk-U Kingdom in AD 1433. It is situated next to Le-myet-hna Temple which was built by his brother Min Saw Mon, the founder of Mrauk-U Kingdom.

== Image gallery ==
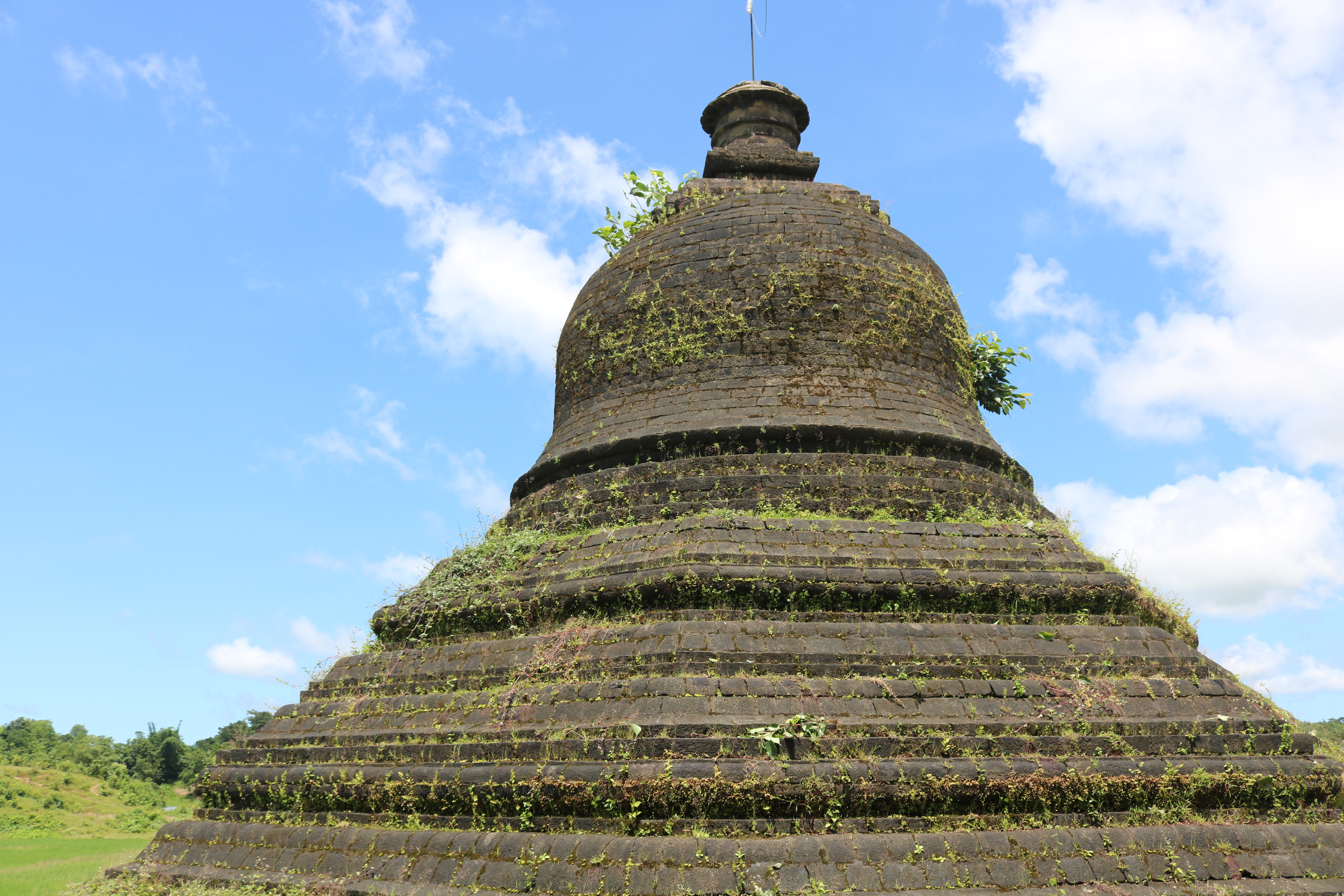
Nyi Taw Temple

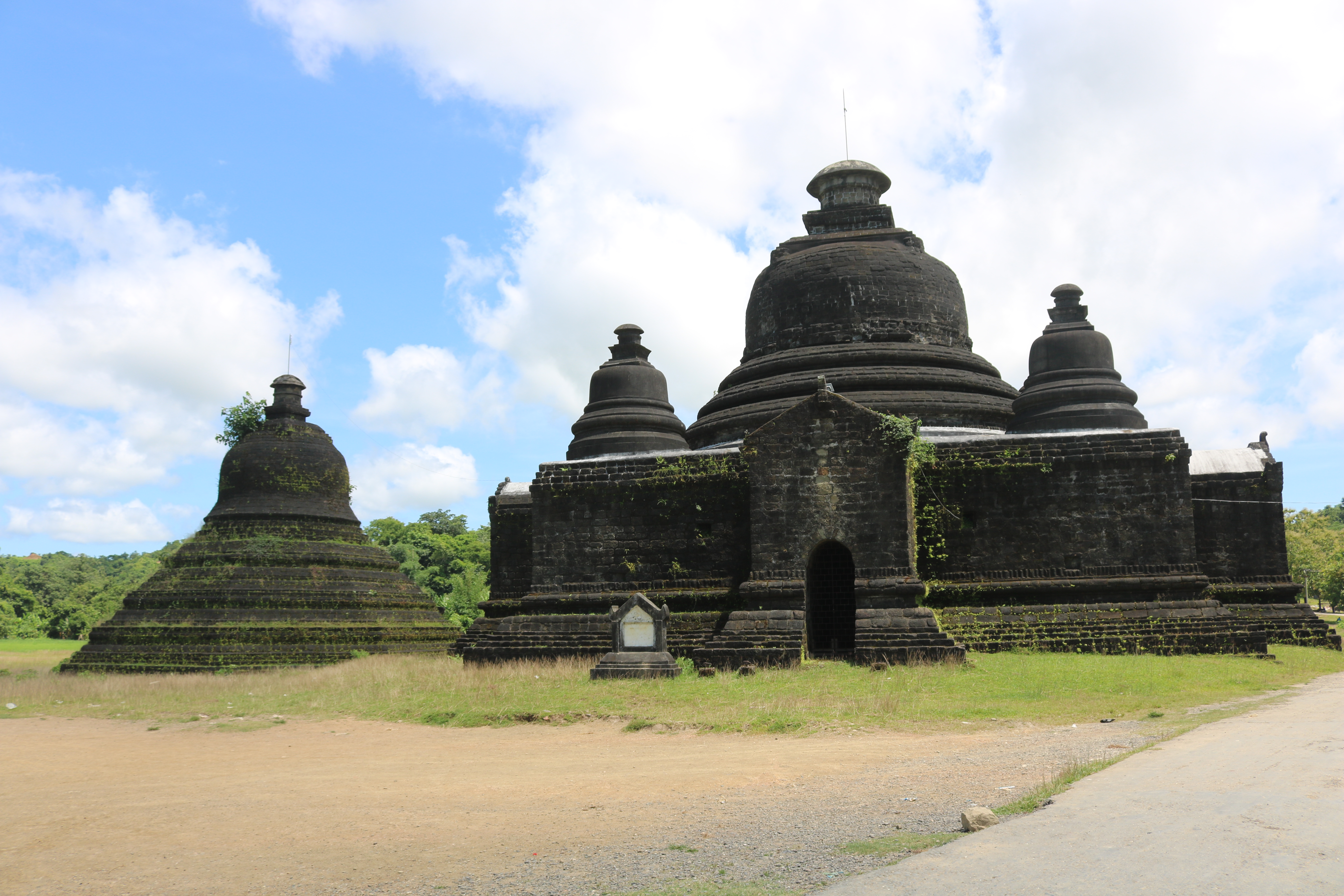
Nyi Taw Temple and Le Myet hna Temple - Mrauk U

== See also ==
- List of Temples in Mrauk U
- Le-myet-hna Temple
- Min Khayi
