= Min Khayi =

Naranu Min Khayi မင်းခရီ

King of Arakan
- Reign: 9 May 1433 – c. January 1459
- Predecessor: Saw Mon
- Successor: Ba Saw Phyu
- Born: c. March 1392; Tuesday, c. Late Tagu 753 ME; Launggyet
- Died: c. January 1459 (aged 66) c. Tabodwe 820 ME; Mrauk-U
- Consort: Saw Pa-Ba; Saw Pyinsa; Saw Yin Mi; Saw Khamout
- Issue: Saw San-Me; Ba Saw Phyu; Ba Saw Nyo; Min Swe of Launggyet
Names
- Naranu Min Khayi (မင်းခရီ); Ali Khan (အလီခင်)
- House: Saw Mon
- Father: Razathu II
- Mother: Saw Hla Mway
- Religion: Theravada Buddhism

Min Khayi (Burmese: မင်းခရီ, Burmese pronunciation: [mɪ́ɴ kʰəjì]; also spelled Mang Khari, Arakanese pronunciation: [máɴ kʰəɹì]; 1392–1459), also known as Ali Khan or Naranu (နရနု), was the second king of the Mrauk-U Kingdom from 1433 to 1459. His 25-year reign brought much needed stability to the Arakan littoral, and prepared his nascent kingdom for future expansions by his successors

He began his reign as a vassal of the Bengal Sultanate, and successfully unified the entire Arakan coastline (present-day Rakhine State in Myanmar (Burma)) in 1437. He then took full advantage of the political turmoil in Bengal by seizing Ramu, the southernmost territory of his erstwhile overlord, and raiding as far north as Chittagong. In 1455, his kingdom finally achieved recognition by Ava, which had long interfered in the affairs of Arakan, as a sovereign state.

The earliest extant work of Arakanese literature in Burmese script, Rakhine Minthami Eigyin was composed during his reign in 1455.

== Early life ==
Born in 1392, Khayi was a son of King Razathu II of Launggyet Kingdom, located in present-day northern Rakhine State. The small principality was a pawn caught between its larger neighbors of the Ava Kingdom and Hanthawaddy Pegu Kingdom, which were locked in a bitter Forty Years' War. Khayi was only about nine years old in 1401 when his father (r. 1394–1395, 1397–1401), died. In November 1406, his half-brother King Saw Mon III was driven out by Avan troops led by Crown Prince Minye Kyawswa. His brother fled to Bengal but Khayi fled to Pegu (Bago). By then, he was known by his title Naranu (or Narathu in Burmese).

At Pegu, King Razadarit agreed to place Khayi to the Launggyet throne as his vassal. Circa March 1408, a 5000-strong Hanthawaddy invaded Arakan, and successfully captured Launggyet. A 16-year-old Khayi was made a puppet king while the real power belonged to Pegu commander, Maung Khwin. But that arrangement was short-lived. Within months, Ava sent an army led by Thray Sithu of Myinsaing and drove out the Peguan troops. Khayi this time fled to the northernmost reaches of Arakan.

For the next two decades, the prince led a quiet life at a village in North Arakan, and did not try to regain the Launggyet throne. He married a daughter of a local rich man and had a son named Saw San-Me. That changed in 1429 when his brother Saw Mon came back with an army from Bengal to retake his throne. En route to Launggyet, Saw Mon got into an argument with Gen. Wali Khan of Bengal, and was imprisoned by the general. The place Saw Mon was imprisoned happened to be near where Khayi had been living in exile, and Khayi broke his brother free. Saw Mon returned to Bengal and returned with another army supplied by the Sultan of Bengal Jalaluddin Muhammad Shah. After Saw Mon regained the Launggyet throne in April 1429, Khayi quickly proved his worth and became the heir-presumptive. He took more wives, including Saw Pa-Ba and Saw Pyinsa, both of Launggyet royalty.

== Reign ==
On 9 May 1433, Saw Mon died at Mrauk-U, the new capital he founded three years earlier. Although Saw Mon had three sons, Khayi succeeded to the throne. He also took the title Ali Khan since their newly founded kingdom was a vassal of Bengal. This was the start of the "strange anomaly" of Buddhist kings of Arakan taking Muslim titles in addition to Buddhist titles, and even issuing medallions bearing the kalima, the Islamic confession of faith in Persian script. This practice probably was introduced in fulfillment of vassalage obligations at first but was continued in later times as a token of sovereignty over Chittagong.

The subordinate relationship did not last long. Sultan Jalaluddin Muhammad Shah died in 1433, and was succeeded by a string of weak sultans. In 1437, Khayi took over the throne of Sandoway (Thandwe), unifying the Arakan coast, probably for the first time in history. He also married Saw Yin Mi, the queen of Sandoway. Then, Khayi occupied Ramu, the southernmost territory of his erstwhile overlord Bengal. The Arakanese chronicles say that Khayi successfully seized Chittagong in 1450. However, the first confirmed successful occupation of Chittagong came only nine years later in 1459 when King Ba Saw Phyu seized the port from Sultan Rukunuddin Barbak Shah.

Even if his northern border did not reach as far north as Chittagong, Khayi had successfully established Mrauk-U as a serious kingdom. Ava, which used to interfere in northern Arakan's affairs (1373–1416), now recognized Mrauk-U as an equal. On 24 March 1455 (Monday, 6th waxing of Old Tagu 816 ME), Khayi and Narapati of Ava met and held a summit at Natyegan Hill past the An Pass.

In 1458, the king finally appointed one of his sons Ba Saw Phyu heir apparent. Another son of his by Queen Saw Pyinsa, Min Swe, governor of Launggyet, was incensed by the selection, and fled to Kale (Kalay), a Shan state and a nominal vassal of Ava. There, he got the saopha of Kale to attack Mrauk-U. On 12 November 1458 (Sunday, 6th waxing of Nadaw 820 ME), Kale forces reached the outskirts of Mrauk-U. The elderly Khayi nonetheless led the Mrauk-U troops from atop his war elephant. Mrauk-U troops with their elephant and cavalry corps soundly defeated the invaders, many of whom surrendered. The captives were then resettled at a place now called Shan-Ywa (Shan village). (Note: (Sandamala Linkara Vol. 2 1999: 21): The battle took place on Sunday, 9th waxing of Nadaw 820, which translates to Wednesday, 15 November 1458. It is probably 6th waxing of Nadaw (Sunday, 12 November 1458). The Burmese numbers ၆ (6) and ၉ (9) are very similar.)

== Death ==
The king died not long after the battle with Kale, in early 1459, at age 66. He was succeeded by Ba Saw Phyu.

== Cultural works ==
Khayi built the Nyi Taw Temple (lit. 'Younger Brother Temple') next to (immediately north of) the Le-myet-hna Temple built by his brother Saw Mon.

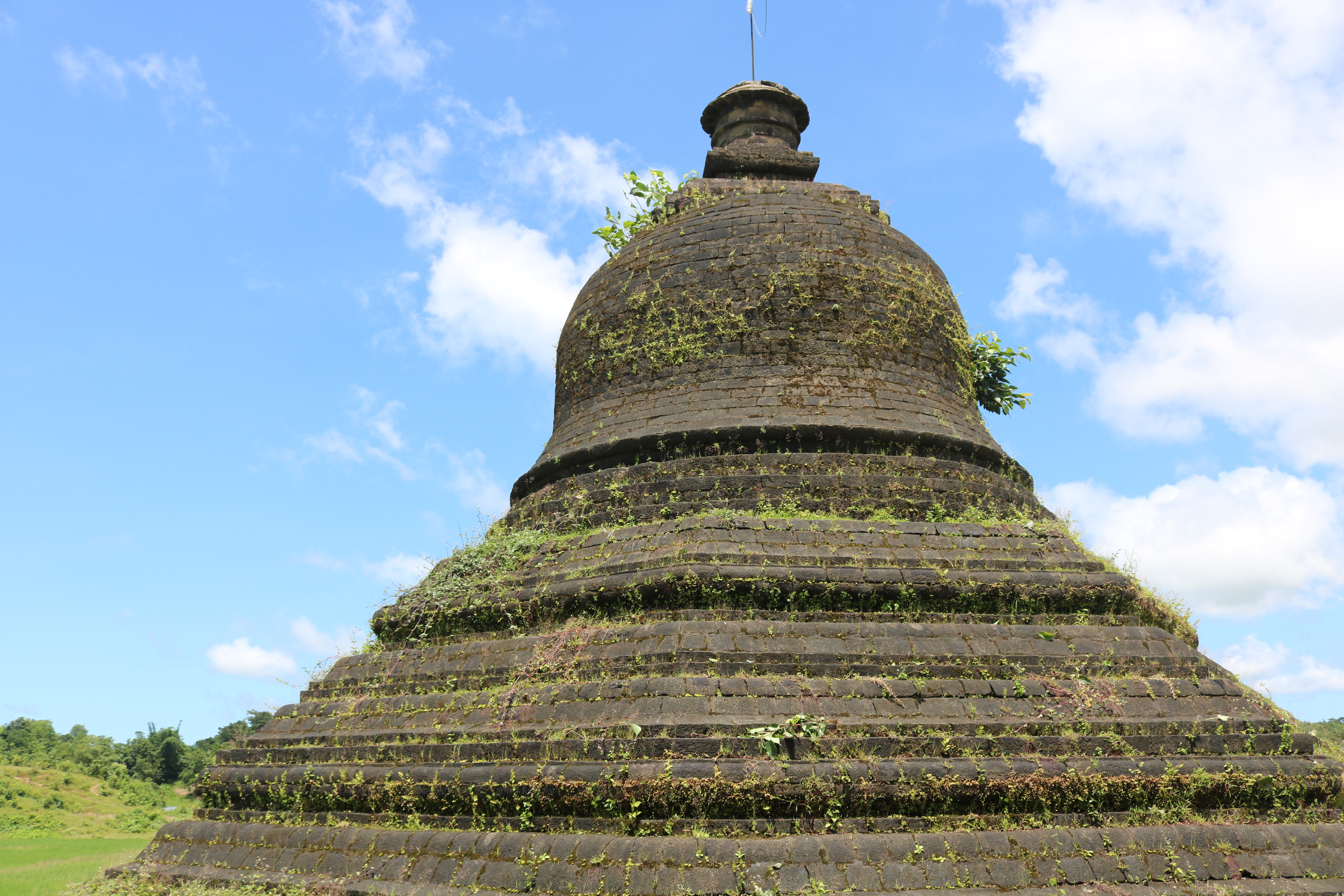
Nyi Taw Temple

The earliest extant work of Arakanese literature in Burmese script, Rakhine Minthami Eigyin ("Lullaby for a Princess of Arakan") appeared in 1455. (Note: (Gutman 2001: 61): The use of Burmese script in Arakan appeared for the first time in the Le-Mro period (11th to 15th centuries) on "votive plaques and on a massive inscription recording of the deeds of the king". The Buddha images from this period "show a strong connection with Pagan, reflecting Burma's suzerainty over Arakan until the mid-12th century.")

== Notes ==
=== Bibliography ===
- Gutman, Pamela (2001). Burma's Lost Kingdoms: Splendours of Arakan. Bangkok: Orchid Press. ISBN 974-8304-98-1.
- Harvey, G. E. (1925). History of Burma: From the Earliest Times to 10 March 1824. London: Frank Cass & Co. Ltd.
- Phayre, Lt. Gen. Sir Arthur P. (1883). History of Burma (1967 ed.). London: Susil Gupta.
- Sandamala Linkara, Ashin (1931). Rakhine Yazawinthit Kyan (in Burmese). Vol. 1–2 (1997–1999 ed.). Yangon: Tetlan Sarpay.
- Singer, Noel F. (2008). Vaishali And The Indianization Of Arakan. New Delhi: APH Publishing. ISBN 978-8-131-30405-1.

Min Khayi Mrauk-U Kingdom Born: c. March 1392 Died: c. January 1459
Regnal titles
Preceded by Saw Mon	King of Mrauk-U; 9 May 1433 – c. January 1459	Succeeded by Ba Saw Phyu
