= Min Saw Mon =

Narameikhla Min Saw Mon နရမိတ်လှ မင်းစောမွန် Saw Mon II of Launggyet

King of Arakan
- Reign: 18 April 1429 – 9 May 1433
- Predecessor: Founder
- Successor: Min Khayi

King of Arakan
- Reign: April 1404 – 29 November 1406
- Predecessor: Theinkhathu
- Successor: Anawrahta (as Ava vassal)
- Born: 1380/81; Thursday, 742 ME; Launggyet
- Died: 9 May 1433 (aged 52); Saturday, 6th waning of Kason 795 ME; Mrauk-U
- Consort: Saw Sit II; Saw Pu Nyo; Saw Pyauk
- Issue: Sons: Min Kyaw, Min Mandat, Min Mon Thin; Daughters: Saw Pu Shwe, Saw Pyo
Names
- Shwenanthakhun Narameikhla Raza (ရွှေနန်းသခင် နာရမိတ်လှရာဇာ) (meaning-King Narameikhla, Lord of Golden Palace); Suleiman Shah
- House: Alawmaphyu
- Father: Razathu II
- Mother: Saw Nyet Htwa
- Religion: Theravada Buddhism

Narameikhla Min Saw Mon, (Arakanese:နရမိတ်လှ မင်းစောမွန်, Burmese pronunciation: [nəɹa̰ meiʔl̥a̰ mɪ́ɰ̃ sɔ́ mʊ̀ɰ̃], Arakanese transliteration: Mong Saw Mwan, or Mawn Saw Mwen, Arakanese pronunciation: [mɔ́ɰ̃ sɔ́ mʊ̀aɰ̃]; 1380–1433) was the last king of the Launggyet Dynasty and the founder of the Mrauk-U Dynasty of Arakan, a former state in Myanmar (Burma).

He became king in 1404 but was driven out of Launggyet in 1406 by Crown Prince Minye Kyawswa of Ava. He sought refuge in the Bengal Sultanate, and later entered the military service of Sultan Jalaluddin Muhammad Shah. In 1429, he reclaimed the Arakanese throne with the help of the sultan, and ruled the kingdom. He founded a new capital, Mrauk-U, in 1430 at a more strategic location. The king died in 1433, and was succeeded by his younger brother Khayi.

== Early life ==
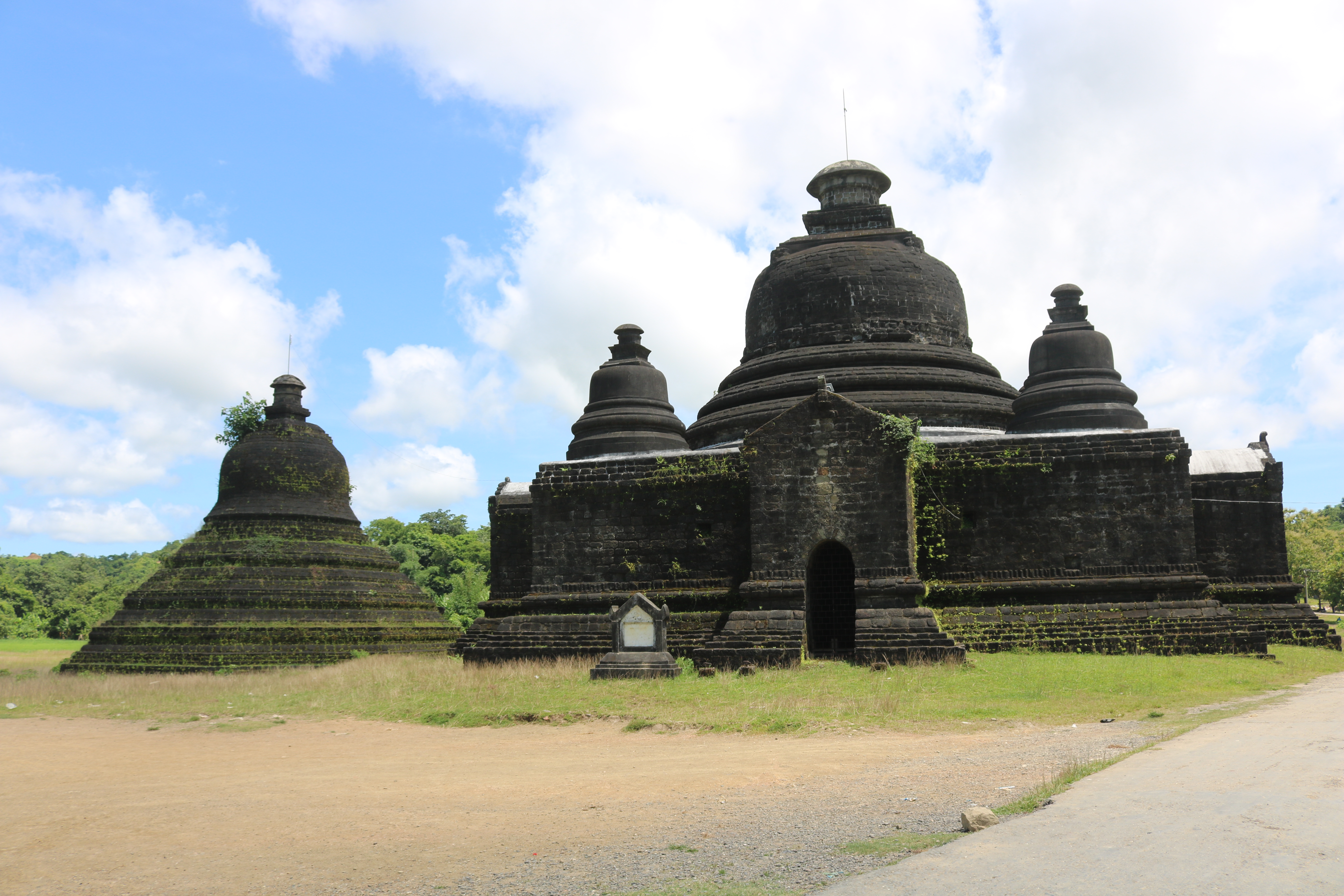
Nyi Daw temple and Li Myak Nha temple built by the king

The future king was born in 1380/81 (742 ME) to Prince Razathu II (ရာဇသူ) and Princess Saw Nyet Htwa (စောညက်ထွား) of Launggyet Kingdom, located in modern northern Rakhine State. The young prince was drawn into court politics during his teenage years and his fortunes were closely tied to those of his father. His father Razathu became king but he was deposed and his family exiled in Kyeintali. He regained the throne in 1397 and ruled until his death in 1401. Razathu's younger brother Theinkhathu (သိင်္ခသူ) succeeded Razathu; he was assassinated in 1404 by an abbot of the royal monastery.

== Last king of Launggyet ==
When Saw Mon ascended to the throne in April 1404 after his uncle's assassination by a monk, the Arakanese (Rakhine) kingdom had been on its last legs for three decades. The kingdom had experienced seemingly endless episodes of political instability and interference from its two stronger neighbors to the east Ava Kingdom (Ava) and Hanthawaddy kingdom (Pegu). In 1373/74 (735 ME), the Launggyet court had to ask for a nominee from Ava, which sent Saw Mon II. Saw Mon II was a good ruler but died in 1381 without an heir. Ava sent another nominee. The new king proved to be a tyrant, and was driven out by the court in 1385/86. From 1385/86 to 1404, the Arakanese throne was subject to rival factions of the court, often supported by Ava and Pegu. However these events are not recorded in the Arakanese Chronicles, neither does it mention court political influence from Ava and Pegu. King Min Hti died in 1385, his three sons whom reigned for short period until Razathu proclaimed the throne in 1395 and 1397 until his death in 1401.

According to the Arakanese Chronicles, Saw Mon's desired over the sister of Viceroy of Dalet, Saw Pu Nyo. King lifted for Dalet and forced Saw Pu Nyo to divorce her husband and later killed husband. This enraged her brother, who later seeks help from the King of Ava to invade and dethroned the ruler.

Saw Mon could not escape the commotion either as his abuse power eventually backfire within two years of Saw Mon's accession, the kingdom was drawn into the Forty Years' War between Ava and Pegu. In November 1406, King Minkhaung I of Ava sent in troops led by its crown prince Minye Kyawswa. Ava troops overran Launggyet on 29 November 1406 (Monday, 5th waning of Natdaw 768 ME). Minkhaung I appointed Anawrahta Saw, then governor of Kalay, to be "king" of Arakan.

Saw Mon barely escaped to Chittagong with a few of his retinue.

== Exile years and restoration ==
Arakan was to be a battlefield between Ava and Pegu for the next six years. Pegu finally got the upper hand in Arakan in 1412, and placed its nominees in Launggyet and Sandoway (Thandwe). Ava set up a rival outpost in North Arakan at Khwethin-Taung in 1413 but the western principality was spared further warfare as Ava focused on finishing off Pegu. Ava came close but could not topple Pegu. The Avan garrison at Khwethin-Taung was also driven out in 1416 by the local northern Arakanese. A divided Arakan was tributary to Pegu at least until King Razadarit's death in 1421. It is not clear if then vassal kings remained loyal to the successors of Razadarit. The Arakanese chronicle Rakhine Razawin Thit notes at least two rival courts—one at Launggyet and one at Sandoway.

Meanwhile, Saw Mon had entered the service of Sultan Jalaluddin Muhammad Shah of Bengal, and proved to be a good commander. According to the Arakanese Chronicles, there was an invasion from Delhi Sultanate and the sultan was desperate but soon came under great plan of futurize Saw Mon. who ask to given command of the army. His first strategy was to confiscate the enemy's dogs while setting up bait which are the spikes filled with meats, as the dogs ate the meats filled with spikes became lesser aggressive and halted further advance of the Delhi Sultanate's canine army. Saw Mon's sultanate army then launched counterattack the enemy positions, the initiate setbacks for the invaders as they are overwhelmed by glaze of silver coins scattered around the bamboo forests shortly began picking up those coins and sensing weakness. Bengal Sultanate was successfully ward off the invasion thanks to military strategist of Saw Mon.

He became close to the sultan and treated him as his brother as Arakan and Bengal are brothers, and convinced the sultan to help him regain the Arakanese throne. The sultan agreed. In February/March 1429 (Tabaung 790 ME), Saw Mon aided by troops "largely made up of Afghan adventurers and Bengali Muslims invaded Arakan. The first attempt at the invasion failed because Saw Mon got into an argument with Gen. Wali Khan of Bengal, and was imprisoned by the general. Saw Mon escaped, and the sultan agreed to another attempt. The second invasion went well. Saw Mon was proclaimed king at Launggyet on 18 April 1429 (Thursday, 1st waning of Kason 791 ME) and gratitude Saw Mon rewarded many Bengali soldiers and many of them returned to Bengal with war prizes. (According to some Arakanese chronicles, such as Inzauk Razawin, the second invasion took place in 1430, a year later).

== Founder of Mrauk-U Kingdom ==
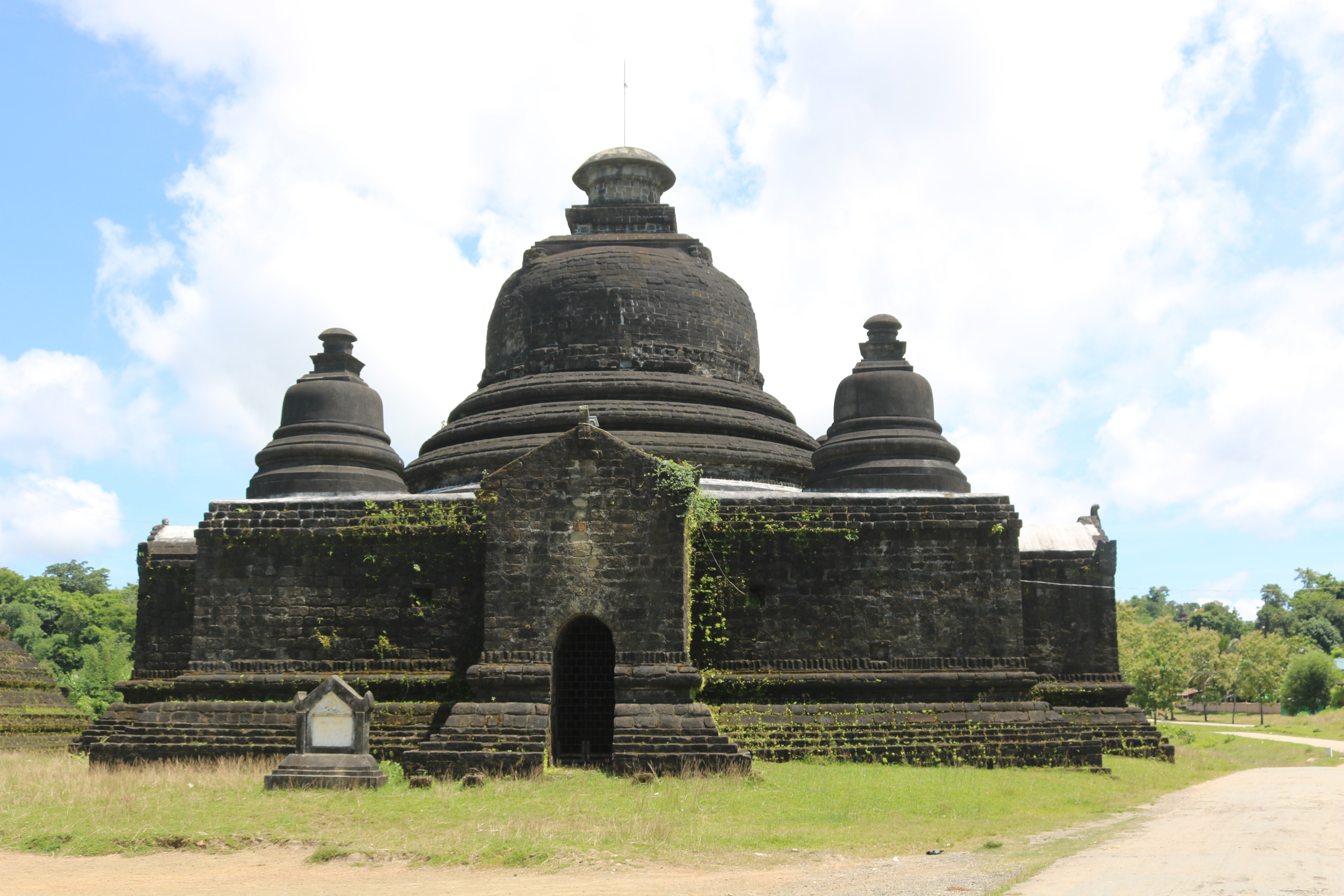
Le Myet Hna Temple – Mrauk U

Saw Mon became king of Arakan but as a vassal of sultanate for some time. His domain was still restricted to northern Arakan where southern Arakan Sandoway was still independent. He decided to move the capital from Launggyet as the old crumpling city destroyed by the Burman-Mon Conflict for decades. The new capital, though not far from Launggyet, was much more strategically located, and would prove much more difficult for invaders to attack. He founded the new capital of Mrauk-U on 16 November 1430 (Sunday, 1st waxing of Natdaw 792 ME) (or 20 August 1430 / Sunday, 1st waxing of Tawthalin 792).

The King paid homage to the Mahamuni Temple and from his way he built road linking between new capital and old Waithali city.

According to the Arakanese chronicles, the king was warned by court astrologers that he would die within a year of foundation of the new capital. He answered that he would rather die to have a safer kingdom for the posterity than to live long, and leave a weak kingdom. The king promptly moved to the new capital when it was completed in 1432/33 (794 ME). Part of the new city, a few miles north of the Mrauk-U Palace, was the Le-myet-hna Temple.

He died soon after on 9 May 1433 (Saturday, 6th waning of Kason 795 ME). (Note: (Sandamala Linkara Vol. 2 1999: 18): Saturday, 6th waning of Kason 795 ME = 9 May 1433. (Harvey 1925: 139–140) says he moved to the capital in 1433 and died in 1434.) He was succeeded by his younger half-brother Khayi.

== Cultural works ==
The King built the Le-myet-hna Temple.

Myatazaung Twin Pagodas- the King also donated and funded the constructions of two pagodas standing on the hill north of Le-myet hna Temple, East Myatazaung and West Myatazaung finished in 1431.

Koe-tan Pagodas - small 9 stupas erected on hills seen above the royal palace.

== Family ==
=== Consort and Issue ===
- Chief queen consort Saw Sit II (မိဖုရားကြီးစောစစ်)
  - Prince Min Mon Thin, (မင်းမွန်သင်း)
  - Princess Saw Pu Shwe, (စောပုရွှေ)
  - Princess Saw Pyo II, (စောပျို)
- Queen consort Saw Pyauk, (မိဖုရားစောပျောက်)
  - Prince Min Kyaw, (မင်းကျော်)
  - Prince Min Manawat, (မင်းမန္တတ်)
- Queen consort Saw Pu Pyo, (မိဖုရားစောပုညို)- sister of Viceroy of Dalet

== Bibliography ==
- Gutman, Pamela (2001). Burma's Lost Kingdoms: Splendours of Arakan. Bangkok: Orchid Press. ISBN 974-8304-98-1.
- Harvey, G. E. (1925). History of Burma: From the Earliest Times to 10 March 1824. London: Frank Cass & Co. Ltd.
- Myat Soe, ed. (1964). Myanma Swezon Kyan (in Burmese). Vol. 9 (1 ed.). Yangon: Sarpay Beikman.
- Myint-U, Thant (2006). The River of Lost Footsteps—Histories of Burma. Farrar, Straus and Giroux. ISBN 978-0-374-16342-6.
- Sandamala Linkara, Ashin (1931). Rakhine Yazawinthit Kyan (in Burmese). Vol. 1–2 (1997–1999 ed.). Yangon: Tetlan Sarpay.

Min Saw Mon Mrauk-U Kingdom Born: 1380 Died: 9 May 1433
Regnal titles
Preceded by None	King of Mrauk-U; 18 April 1429 – 9 May 1433	Succeeded by Khayi
Preceded by Theinkhathu	King of Launggyet; April 1404 – 29 November 1406	Succeeded by Abolished
