= Kingdom of Mrauk U =

Kingdom in Western Myanmar (1429–1785)

Coordinates: 20°35′24″N 93°11′33″E

Kingdom of Mrauk-U မြောက်ဦးဘုရင့်နိုင်ငံ
- 1430–1785
- Mrauk U expansion in the 1630s including raided territories
- Status: Vassal of Bengal Sultanate (1429–1437); Independent (1437–1784); Vassal of Konbaung dynasty (1785)
- Capital: Launggyet (1429–1430); Mrauk U (1430–1785)
- Official languages: Arakanese
- Religion: Buddhism (Theravada Buddhism as de facto state religion), Islam, Hinduism, Christianity, Animism
- Government: Feudal monarchy (until 1782)
  - 1429–1433: Min Saw Mon (first)
  - 1433–1459: Min Khayi
  - 1531–1554: Min Bin
  - 1593–1612: Min Razagyi
  - 1622–1638: Thiri Thudhamma
  - 1652–1674: Sanda Thudhamma
  - 1782–1785: Maha Thammada (last)
- Legislature: Royal Parliamentary System
- Historical era: 15th to 18th Century
  - Founding of dynasty: September 1430
  - Vassal of Bengal Sultanate: 1429–1437
  - Conquest of Chittagong: 1459
  - Joint-control of Lower Burma: 1599–1603
  - Mughal–Mrauk U Wars: 1602–1666
  - Loss of Chittagong: 1666
  - Vassal of Konbaung dynasty: 1784
  - End of kingdom: 2 January 1785
- Currency: Dinga
Preceded by
Launggyet Dynasty
Interregnum
Bengal Sultanate
Succeeded by
Konbaung Dynasty
Portuguese settlement in Chittagong
- Today part of: Myanmar; Bangladesh; India

The Kingdom of Mrauk-U (Arakanese: မြောက်ဦး ဘုရင့်နိုင်ငံတော်) or Kingdom of Arakan was a kingdom that existed on the Arakan coastal plain from 1429 to 1785. Based in the capital Mrauk U, near the eastern coast of the Bay of Bengal, the kingdom ruled over what is now Rakhine State, Myanmar, and the southern part of Chittagong Division, Bangladesh. Though it started out as a protectorate of the Bengal Sultanate from 1429 to 1531, Mrauk-U went on to conquer Chittagong with the help of the Portuguese. It twice fended off the Toungoo Burma's attempts to conquer the kingdom in 1546–1547, and 1580–1581. At its height of power, it briefly controlled the Bay of Bengal coastline from the Sundarbans to the Gulf of Martaban from 1599 to 1603. In 1666, it lost control of Chittagong after a war with the Mughal Empire. Its existence continued until 1785, when it was conquered by the Konbaung dynasty of Burma.

It was home to a multiethnic population, with the Buddhists making up the majority and the city of Mrauk U being home to temples, shrines, mosques, seminaries and libraries. The kingdom was also a center of piracy and the slave trade. It was frequented by Arab, Danish, Dutch and Portuguese traders.

== History ==
=== Launggyet Dynasty ===
Although Arakan kings paid tribute to the Pagan dynasty, the South was mostly free of Pagan suzerainty and largely cut off from the rest of Burma. Separated from Pagan by the Arakan Mountains, Arakan developed more independently to other Burmese regions. The capital moved from Thaibeiktaung to Dhanyawadi to Vesali before the 11th century, and then to Pyinsa, Parein, and Hkrit in the 12th century, with the capital moving to Pyinsa again in 1180, and then Launggyet in 1237.

=== Vassal state of Bengal Sultanate ===
Arakan had close contact with Bengal, coming into full contact with it as it was expanding eastwards. During the reign of King Min Hti of Arakan (1279–1374), Bengal invaded parts of Arakan sea, raiding the Hinya river at Chittagong. Following the collapse of Pagan power and the death of Min Hti, Arakan fell into an interregnum, and constant raids were conducted by both the Burmese and the Talaing. The new king who took power in 1404, Narameikhla, who was a great-grandson of Min Hti, was immediately ousted by the forces of the Burmese Crown Prince Minye Kyawswa, who captured Launggyet and forced Narameikhla to flee to the court of the Sultanate of Bengal at Gour. During Narameikhla's 24-year exile, Arakan became an extensive battleground for the Ava Kingdom and the Pegu Kingdom. The King of Ava installed his son-in-law on the throne of Arakan, bestowing him the title of Anoarahtâ. Pegu forces later captured and executed him. The power struggle ended with Razadarit coming out on top, capturing Taunggyet and installing his own governor, who was in power until 1423.

==== Reign of Narameikhla ====
After 24 years of exile, Narameikhla regained control of the Arakanese throne in 1430 with military assistance from Bengali commanders Wali Khan and Sindhi Khan. The Bengalis who came with him formed their own settlements in the region. Narameikhla ceded some territory to the Sultan of Bengal and recognised his sovereignty over the areas. In recognition of his kingdom's vassal status, the kings of Arakan received Islamic titles, despite being Buddhists, and legalised the use of Islamic gold dinar coins from Bengal within the kingdom. They also employed Bengali Muslims in prestigious positions within the royal administration. Narameikhla minted his own, with Burmese characters on one side and Persian characters on the other. Despite ruling parts of Bengal, it continued to remain a protectorate of the Sultan of Bengal up until 1531.

Narameikhla founded the city of Mrauk U, which was declared the capital of the Arakanese kingdom in 1431. As the city grew, many Buddhist pagodas and temples were built. Several of them remain, and these are the main attraction of Mrauk-U. From the 15th to the 18th centuries, Mrauk U was the capital of the Arakan kingdom, frequently visited by foreign traders (including Portuguese and Dutch). The golden city of Mrauk U became known in Europe as a city of oriental splendor after Friar Sebastian Manrique visited the area in the early 17th century. Father Manrique wrote a vivid account of the coronation of King Thiri Thudhamma in 1635.

=== Independence from Bengal ===
Narameikhla was succeeded by his brother, Min Khayi, who annexed Sandoway and Ramu in 1437. Min Khayi's successor, Ba Saw Phyu occupied Chittagong with the help of the Portuguese, at the beginning of his reign. Although Barbek Shah, the new Sultan of Bengal, allowed Bengal to falter, Arakan remained subordinate to Bengal until 1531.

In 1454, a treaty with Ava established the Rakhine Yoma mountain range's watershed as the political boundary between the two kingdoms, creating a status quo of mutual non-interference. As a result, opponents like the Changma raiders were no longer automatically pursued if they crossed into the other kingdom's territory. This agreement had facilitated the increased export of Shan ruby stones to India.

Ba Saw Phyu was succeeded by his son Dawlya, who launched a rebellion against him in 1482, taking his life. A line of weak kings followed. However, in 1531, Minbin took the throne, strengthening the fortifications of Mrauk U and fighting back against coastal raids by pirates. Minbin was responsible for the construction of the Shwedaung pagoda as well as the Shitthaung, Dukkanthein, and Lemyethna temples in Mrauk U.

==== Conquest of Chittagong ====
Chittagong came under the Arakanese control during the 16th and 17th centuries. A Buddhist inscription from 1542 in Chittagong confirms that by the 1540s, Arakanese rule was firmly established under King Min Bin (1531–1553), who strengthened Chittagong as a key military and trade hub. Although Arakanese dominance over the region was periodically challenged by conflicts with Bengal, Tripura, and the Mughals, their rule was maintained through alliances with Portuguese mercenaries and a strong naval presence.

In the late 1530s, Afghan warlord Sher Shah (d. 1545) defeated the last independent Sultan of Bengal, Ghiyath ud-Din Mahmud Shah (1533–1538). In Chittagong, a power struggle emerged between two local governors, Amirza Khan and Khuda Bakhsh Khan, who had been appointed by Ghiyath ud-Din Mahmud Shah. Min Bin likely capitalized on this conflict to intervene and seize control of Chittagong.

Chittagong emerged as a key center for regional trade, although its administration was plagued by piracy, slave raids, and conflicts with neighboring powers. The Portuguese provided significant support to the Arakanese navy during this time. The renowned Bengali poet Alaol was enslaved during this period, later rising to prominence at the Arakanese court.

==== Toungoo-Arakan Wars ====
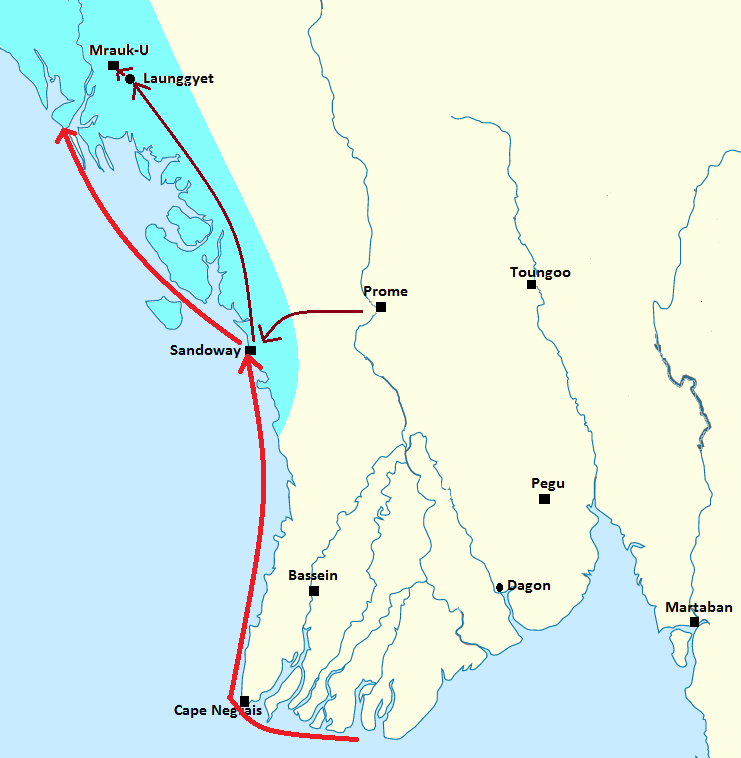
Routes in the Toungoo–Mrauk-U War

During Minbin's reign, Arakan came under attack both from the north, from the coast, and from the east. In 1544, the armies of King Tabinshwehti of Burma invaded and took Sandoway, beginning the Toungoo–Mrauk-U War.

The war was mainly triggered when King Min Bin provided military support in 1542 to the Kingdom of Ava during the Toungoo–Ava War (1538–1545). Although Min Bin withdrew from the alliance later that same year, King Tabinshwehti of Toungoo was determined to retaliate for Mrauk U's involvement.

Taungoo forces were unable to march further than Sandoway, and were held there for two years. Tabinshwehti brought in and Shan fighters and revitalized his offensive, marching north to Mrauk U. However, once he reached the city, Tabinshwehti retreated, as he realised it was too well-defended and he did not want to besiege or blockade it. From the north also came the Raja of Twipra, who marched as far as Ramu.

By 1547, Mrauk U successfully repelled the Toungoo invasions and maintained its independence. The war also served as a deterrent, as Mrauk U would not face another Toungoo invasion until 1580. Soon after, Twipra had also been driven back. Upon reclaiming Chittagong from this invasion, Minbin struck from producing coins with his name that styled him as sultan. Minbin's reign ended in 1553.

=== Golden Age ===
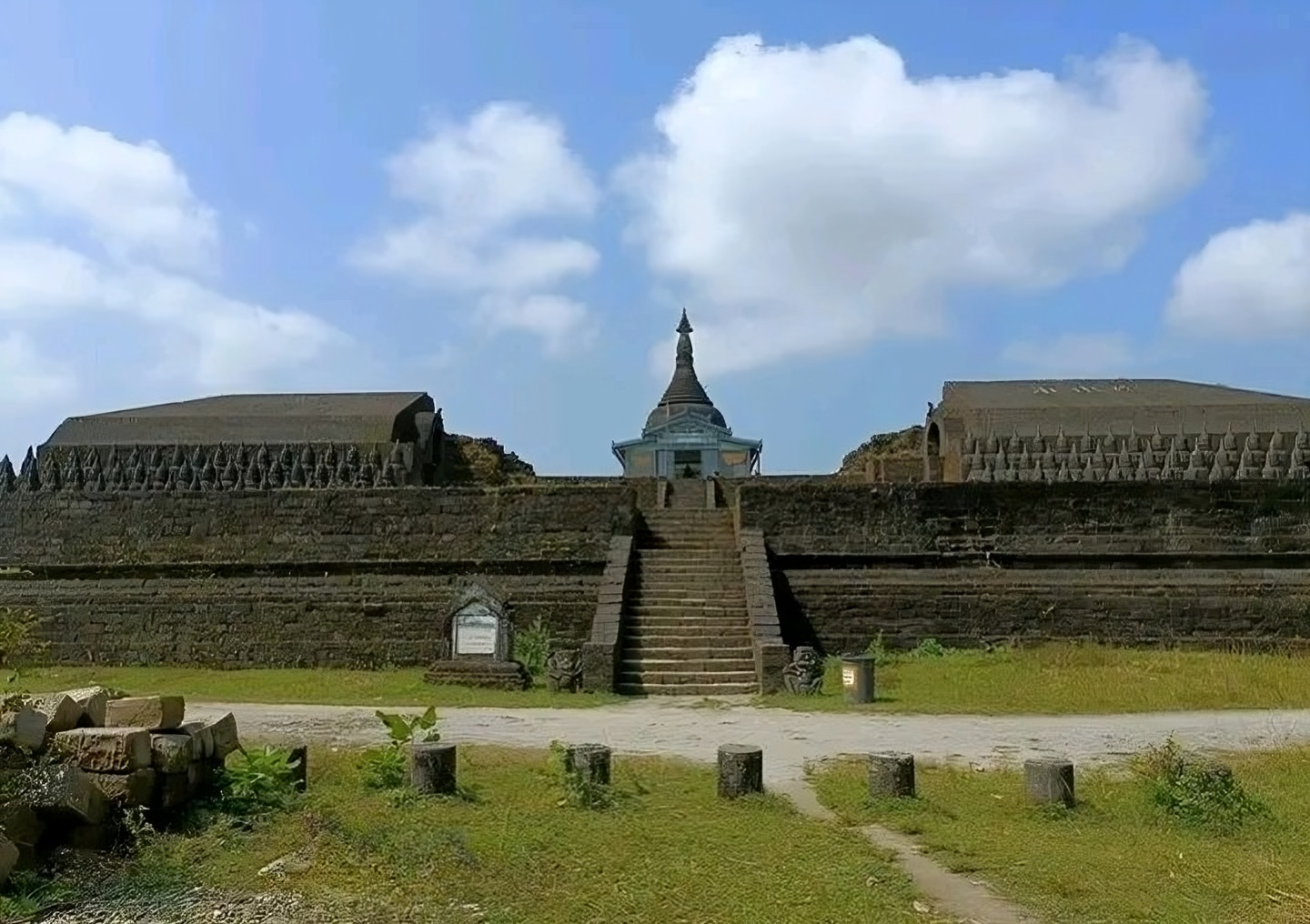
The Koe-thaung temple built in 1552

In the historiography of Mrauk U, the kingdom's history is typically divided into early and late periods. Though historians disagree on the specific cutoffs- the 17th century is both the kingdom's golden age and the turning point towards it relative decline.

The Mahamuni Buddha image, which is now in Mandalay, was cast and venerated some 15 miles from Mrauk U where another Mahamuni Buddha Image flanked by two other Buddha images.

==== Raids on Bengal and Tripura ====
From 1531 to 1629, Arakanese raiders and Portuguese pirates operated from havens along the coast of the kingdom and brought slaves in from Bengal to the kingdom. Following many raids into Bengal, the slave population increased in the 17th century as they were employed in a variety of industries in Arakan. Slaves included members of the Mughal nobility. A notable royal slave was Alaol, a renowned poet in the Arakanese court.

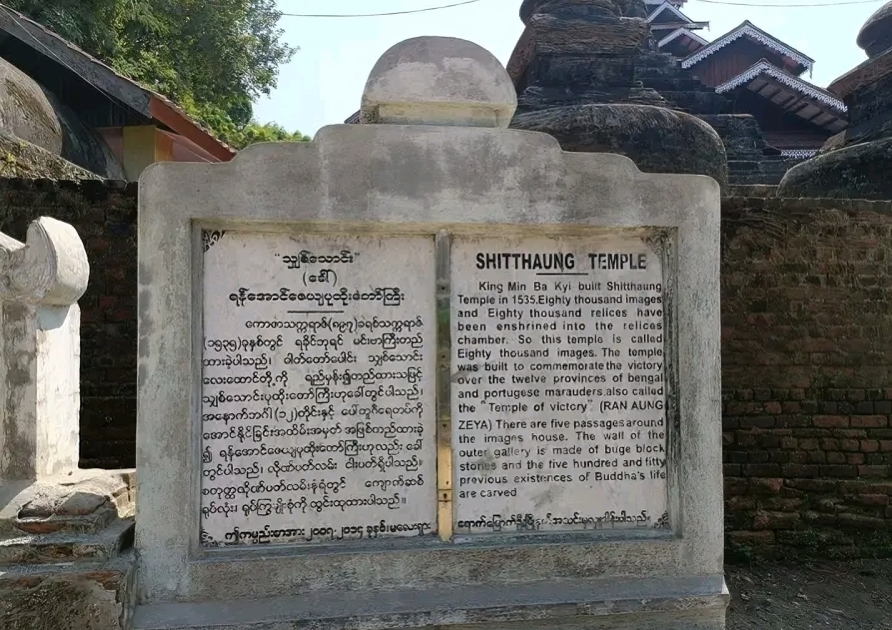
Inscription at the Shittaung Temple about King Min Bin

In 1584 AD, Arakan king Min Phalaung, invaded Tripura and advanced to Udaipur. The Arakanese forces looted Udaipur and carried out a massacre. Min Phalaung tried to take control of northern Bengal and Tripura, areas that Arakanese kings had never fully controlled before. In January 1575, he sent a well-armed force led by then Crown Prince Thado Dhamma Raza (later Min Razagyi) to Tripura. The Arakanese forces quickly took the Tripuri capital against Raja Amar Manikya and Tripura agreed to become a tributary state. He also kept a strong garrison at Chittagong which included many Portuguese sailors and soldiers.

Around the late 1590s, King Min Phalaung of Arakan invaded much of present-day Noakhali. Following the conquest of Noakhali and Chittagong, the Tripura king Rajdhar Manikya led a large force to reclaim the occupied territories. The Tripura army was then defeated again, with its king, being seriously wounded by a bullet shot, and his younger brother Jujhar Singh killed. The Arakanese forces then advanced into Tripura, reaching Udaipur, which they looted and plundered.

Portuguese pirates, in collaboration with Arakanese forces actively raided the Sundarbans and the Ganges delta during the early 17th centuries. These raids targeted coastal Bengal, including areas like Chittagong and the Sundarbans, leading to the capture and enslavement of many inhabitants. The enslaved individuals were sold in Arakan's markets contributing to the kingdom's economy.

==== Territorial expansion ====
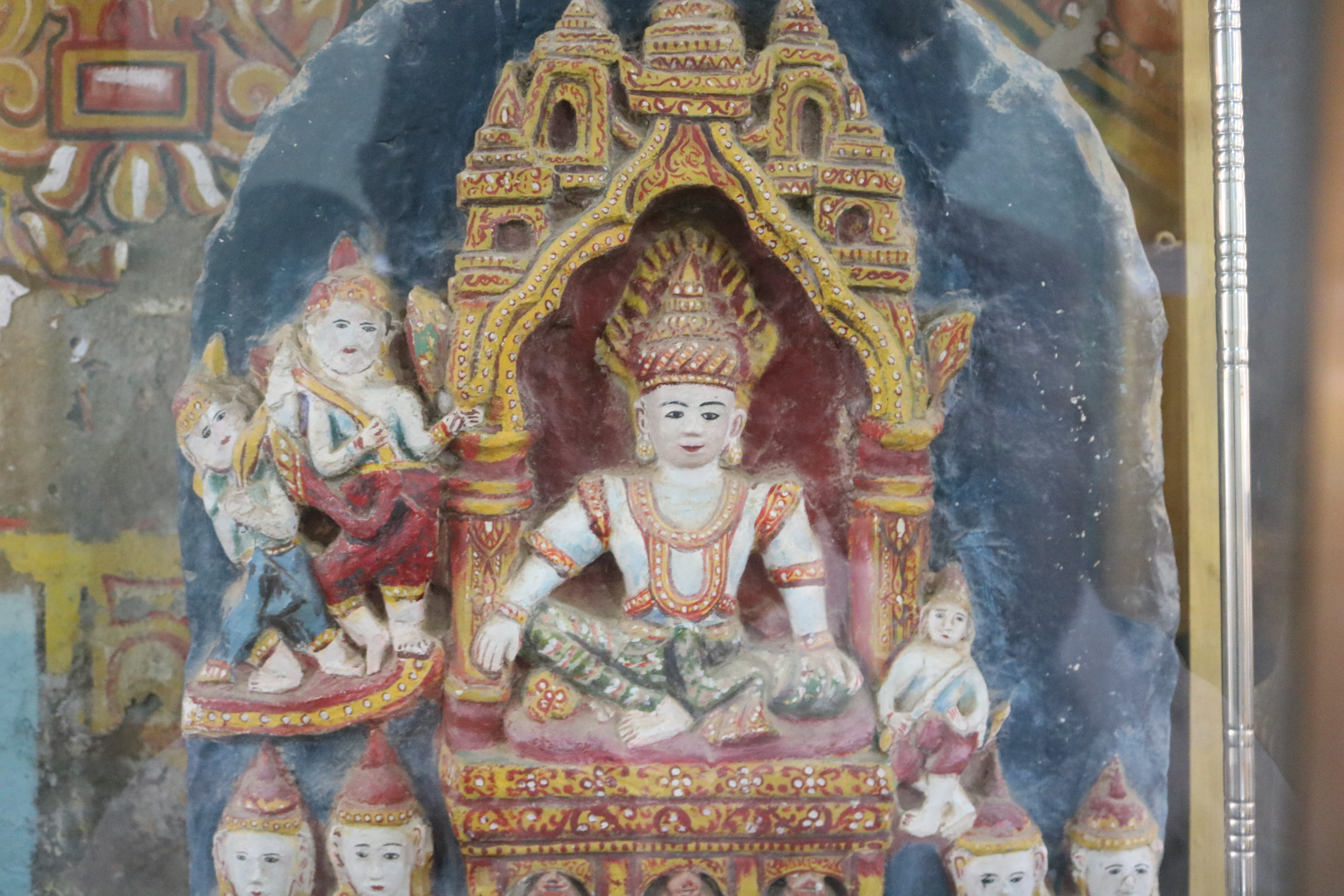
King Min Razagyi Statue

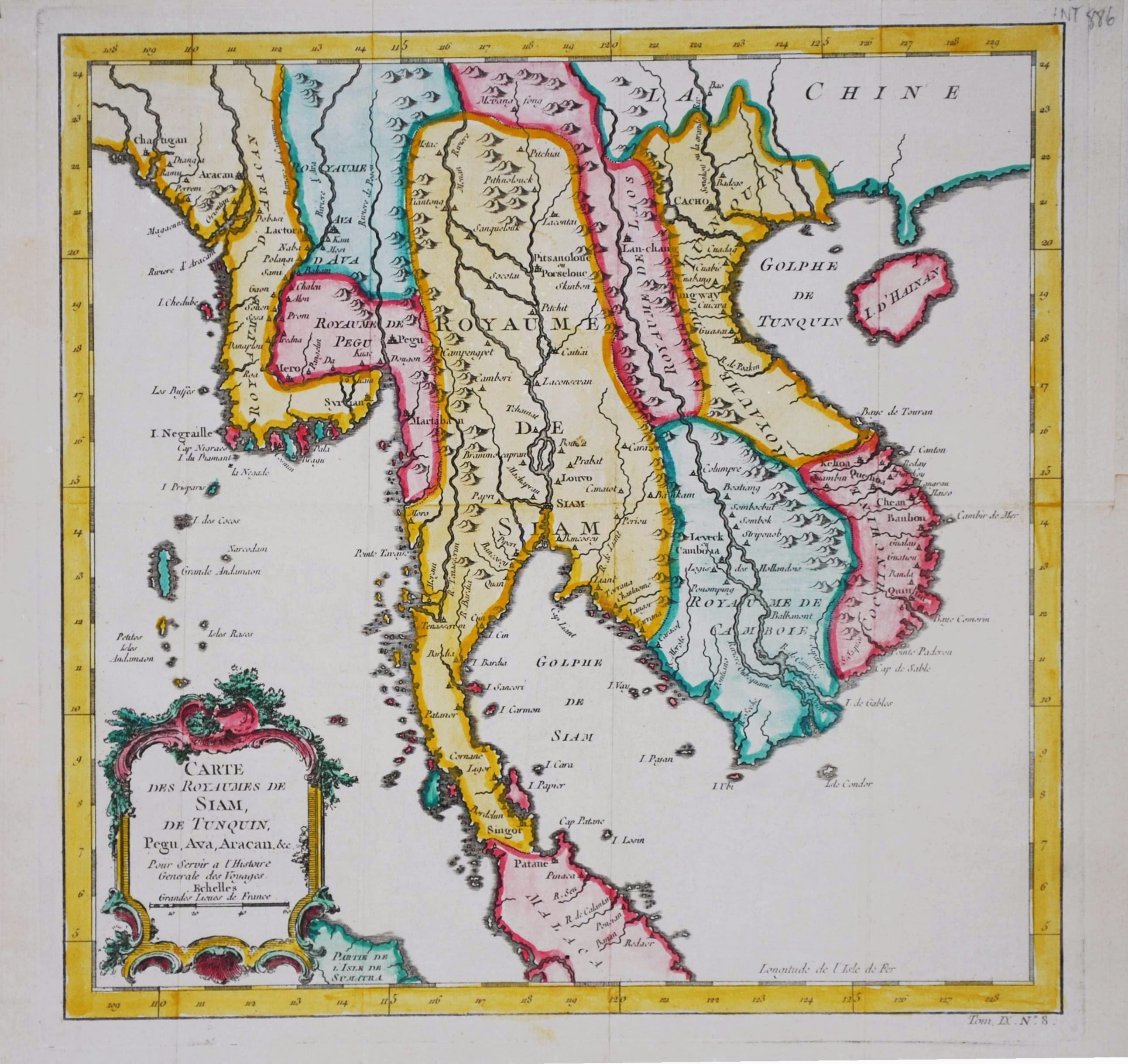
Arakan at the height of its area expansion in the early 17th century

Down the line of kings came Min Razagyi (1593–1612). During his reign, Mrauk U's territory nearly doubled. He capitalized on the declining First Taungoo Empire by invading Pegu (present-day Bago). In 1597, Min Razagyi allied with Minye Thihathu II of Toungoo, and by March 1599, a formidable Arakanese force of approximately 30,000 troops and 300 war boats, bolstered by Portuguese mercenaries led by Filipe de Brito e Nicote, captured the strategic port city of Syriam (Thanlyin). By April, they laid siege to Pegu, leading to King Nanda Bayin's surrender in December 1599. The victors divided Pegu's immense wealth, with the Arakanese seizing treasures, including gold, silver, precious stones, bronze cannons, 30 Khmer bronze statues, and a revered white elephant. Min Razagyi also took Princess Khin Ma Hnaung, Nanda Bayin's daughter, as his queen.

Filipe de Brito was appointed governor of Syriam by Razagyi. However, he shook off Arakanese power over the region, and, supported by Goa, he pushed away the many attacks of Arakan. Razagyi would take three years (1602–1605) to retake Sandwip from the Portuguese.

==== Conflicts with the Portuguese ====
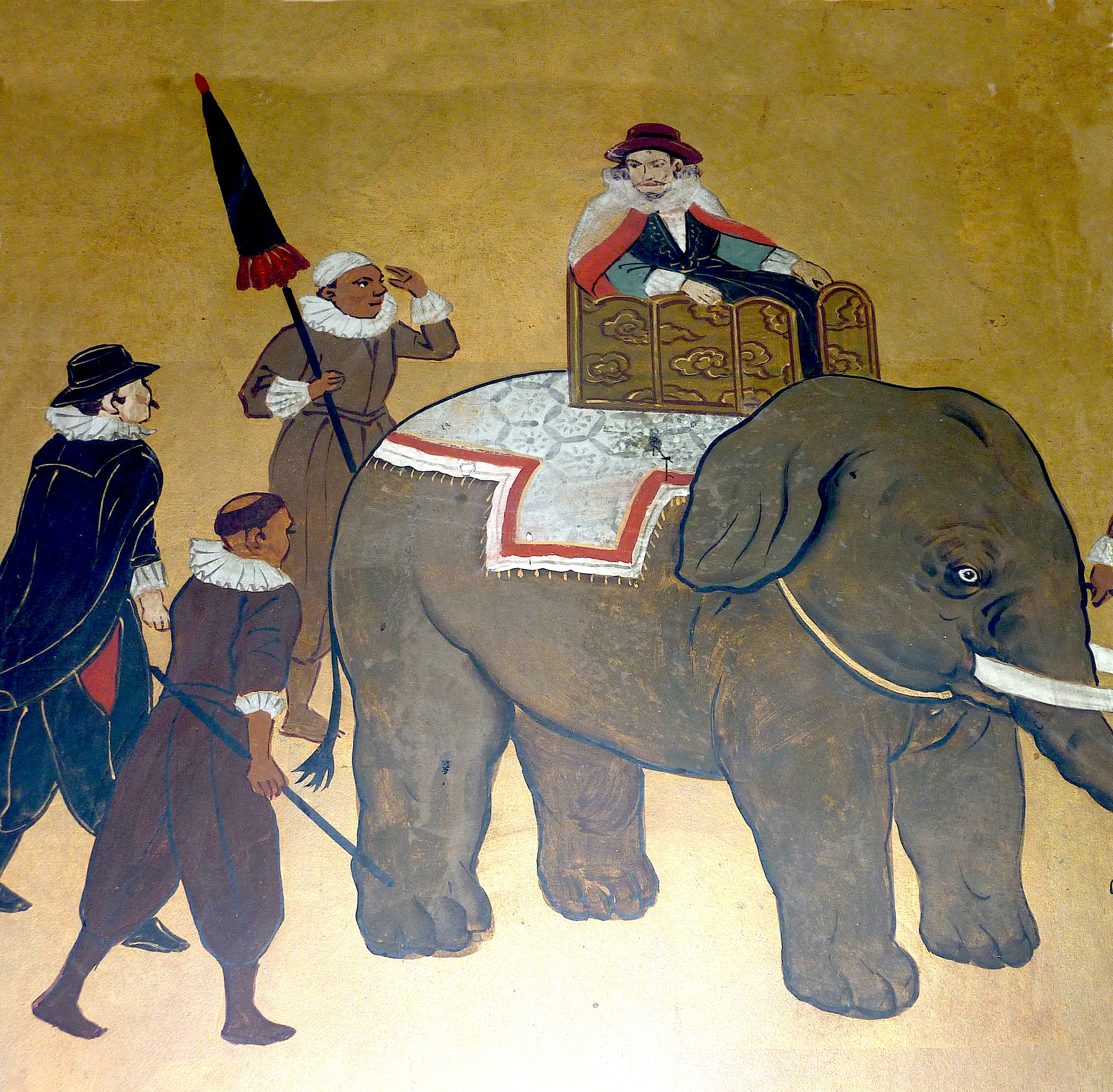
Filipe de Brito, Portuguese mercenary and governor of Syriam, Burma, circa 1600.

The Kingdom had a fluctuating type of relationship with the Portuguese during the late 16th and early 17th centuries. The Arakanese navy, which heavily relied on Portuguese mercenaries, controlled a significant stretch of the Bay of Bengal coastline. Tensions escalated in 1603 when Portuguese mercenary commander De Brito revolted, supported by the Portuguese viceroy of Goa. Despite efforts by King Min Razagyi to regain control of Syriam, including sending a naval force, negotiations in 1604 resulted in Syriam becoming a Portuguese colony, and Razagyi paid a ransom for the release of the crown prince.

In response, Razagyi took harsh actions against Portuguese settlers in his territory, executing 600 on Dianga Island and seeking Dutch assistance to expel the Portuguese, though the Dutch declined. In 1609, Sebastian Gonzales Tibao, a Portuguese escapee, captured Sandwip Island, aligning with Razagyi's opponents and raiding the Arakanese coast. By 1610, Tibao further betrayed Razagyi by seizing the Arakanese fleet and continuing his raids, intensifying the conflict.

=== Crisis of the Millennium ===
In 1628, the Laungkrakca (governor of Launggyet) rebelled during Thiri Thudhamma's reign. The rebellion was put down and many leading men executed, but this only furthered the importance of future Laungkrakca.

At the time, the Arakanese chronicle tradition had prophecised that the Mrauk U lineage of kings would end by the turn of the first millennium- roughly 1638 according to the Arakanese era. Various royal court ministers, including the Laungkrakca became more aggressive in vying for power. On 31 May 1638, Thiri Thudhamma mysteriously died. His son and crown prince Min Sanay ascended the throne, only to die 26 days later. After this, the Laugkrakca ascended the throne as Narapati. Historian Jacques Leider ascribes this chain of events as a coup d'état by the Laungkrakca, creating instability within the kingdom

After his ascension, the governor of Chittagong rebelled claiming the throne for himself. The rebellion was quashed, but in December 1643, the new governor of Chittagong rebelled, taking a large group of Portuguese mercenaries with him into Mughal territory. Narapati sent substantial army to quell this second rebellion, choosing to pillage Chittagong. His troops brought back 80,000 people – mostly weavers—and several tens of thousands of cattle. This effectively destroyed the importance of Chittagong as a trade centre and created deep division in Arakan as the Dutch East India Company and various nobles protested the move. The sceptics of the king's plan were eventually proven correct as the resettled craftsmen were decimated by a famine in 1645 caused by the sudden change in population, effectively destroying Arakan's textile industry as well. This destruction and Narapati's attitude to the Dutch, pushed trade in eastern Bengal further west. Furthermore, advances in Dutch shipbuilding diminished the impact of Arakanese raids in Lower Burma, further pushing that trade back to Lower Burma. During Narapati's reign, Mrauk U's control of Chittagong and the Bay of Bengal trade had all but collapsed.

=== Mughal-Mrauk U Wars ===
The 1666 Mughal conquest of Chittagong marked a definite end of the Golden Age of Arakan for most historians. Arakan lost control of end of western bank of the Naf River in southeast Bengal after the Mughal conquest of Chittagong.

Relations with the Mughals began in the early 17th century as the Portuguese and Arakanese continued their raids of the Ganges Delta, now Mughal Bengal, including a raid in Dhaka in 1625.

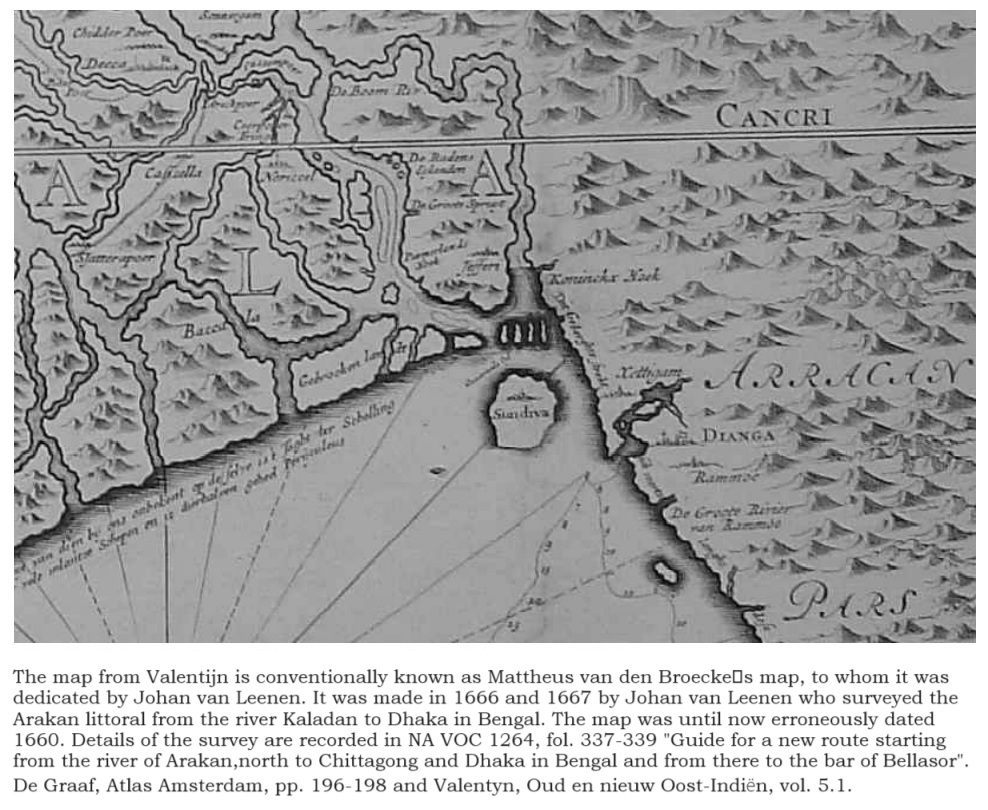
Map of Chittagong area in 1660

In 1660, Prince Shah Shuja, the governor of Mughal Bengal and a claimant of the Peacock Throne, fled to Arakan with his family after being defeated by his brother Emperor Aurangzeb during the Battle of Khajwa. Shuja and his entourage arrived in Arakan on 26 August 1660. He was granted asylum by King Sanda Thudhamma. In December 1660, the Arakanese king confiscated Shuja's gold and jewelry, leading to an insurrection by the royal Mughal refugees. According to varying accounts, Shuja's family was killed by the Arakanese, while Shuja himself may have fled to a kingdom in Manipur. However, members of Shuja's entourage remained in Arakan and were recruited by the royal army, including as archers and court guards. They were king makers in Arakan until the Burmese conquest.

Under the pretext to avenge the murder of his brother at the hands of the Arakanese King, the Aurangzeb decided to invade Chittagong. In 1664, the Arakanese ships raided Jahangirnagar in Bengal, with the help of the Portuguese pirates, and destroyed about 160 Mughal imperial ships. This furthered the Mughals' resolve to put an end to the Arakanese piracy. Aurangzeb appointed Shaista Khan as subahdar (governor) of Bengal. Fearing an inevitable conflict with the Mughals the Arakanese started preparing for war. At the behest of the Mughal Emperor, Shaista Khan embarked on a war plan, rebuilding the destroyed ships.

In the winter of 1665, Subahdar Shaista Khan formed a well-equipped army to fight against the Arakanese. His son, Buzurg Umed Khan joined this mission of Chittagong recovery as the chief commander. By November, the Mughals, with Dutch and Portuguese naval support, captured Sandwip Island. A Mughal force of 6,500, led by Shaista Khan's son, Buzurg Ummed Khan, advanced toward Chittagong. On January 27, 1666, the Mughals seized Chittagong after a three–day siege. But due to insufficient logistics and the monsoon, they limited their progress to the banks of the Naf river. After that, the Arakanese would attempt recapture of Chittagong, but they were not successful.

=== Decline ===
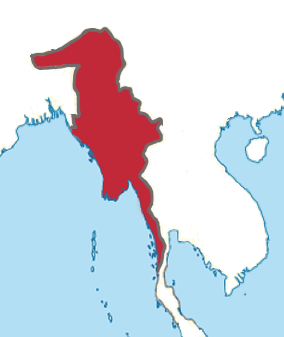
Arakan annexed under the Konbaung Dynasty

King Bodawpaya of the Konbaung Dynasty sought to consolidate Burma's western frontiers to preempt external threats. Arakan's location along the Bay of Bengal made it a strategic gateway for maritime trade and a buffer against British colonial expansion in Bengal. Arakan, with its ancient Buddhist heritage was portrayed as a "fallen" kingdom requiring purification. The annexation and relocation of the Mahamuni Buddha Temple allowed Bodawpaya to present himself as a restorer of Buddhist order.

Following the Burmese invasion in 1785, the kingdom came to an end. As many as 35,000 people of the region at that time fled to the neighbouring Chittagong region and Cox's Bazar areas of the British Bengal in 1799 to seek protection under the British Raj.

== Governance and culture ==
The governance of the kingdom was structured as a feudal monarchy, where the king held ultimate authority over a layered hierarchy of nobles and administrative officers.

=== Foreign relations ===
Mrauk U maintained diplomatic and trade relations with Bengal, the Portuguese, Burma and Ceylon. The ties included military alliances, religious exchanges, and occasional conflicts.

==== Relations with Bengal ====
The Kingdom had an intricate relation with the Bengal region, initially serving as a vassal to the Bengal Sultanate. This relationship began when Narameikhla (Min Saw Mon), the exiled Arakanese king, sought refuge in Bengal and later reclaimed his throne in 1430 with Bengali military assistance. In acknowledgment of Bengal's support, Narameikhla ceded territory and accepted tributary status, leading to the integration of Islamic elements into the predominantly Buddhist kingdom's administration and culture.

As Mrauk U's power grew after independence from Bengal, it expanded into southeastern Bengal, notably capturing Chittagong around 1590. This expansion was facilitated by alliances with Portuguese mercenaries. The Arakanese-Portuguese partnership played a vital role in establishing control over these territories. Mrauk U and Bengal had several conflicts, notably the Bengal Sultanate–Mrauk U War (1512–1516), Mrauk U invasion of Chittagong and later confrontations with the Mughal Empire in the 17th century.

==== Relations with Portuguese ====
Mrauk U had multifaced relationship with the Portuguese during the late 16th and early 17th centuries.

In the late 16th century, the Arakanese kingdom relied heavily on Portuguese mercenaries to strengthen its naval forces, allowing them to control a vast stretch of the Bay of Bengal coastline. However, tensions between the Portuguese and the Arakanese escalated in 1603 when Portuguese mercenary commander Filipe de Brito e Nicote, supported by the Portuguese viceroy of Goa, led a revolt against the Arakanese king. This rebellion triggered a direct Portuguese attack on Mrauk U, but the Portuguese forces were ultimately repelled by the Arakanese using fireships.

Beyond military matters, the Portuguese sought to establish economic ties with the Arakanese. In 1569, their growing influence in the region became evident when they assassinated the Afghan governor of Chittagong. Around 1590, the Portuguese provided military support to the Arakanese to help consolidate their rule in Chittagong, in return for trade privileges.

Culturally, the Portuguese left a lasting imprint on Mrauk U. Friar Sebastião Manrique, an Augustinian monk, spent several years in Mrauk U from 1630 to 1635, offering valuable accounts of the kingdom's society and religious practices. During this time, Portuguese missionaries built churches and introduced Christian religious practices.

==== Relations with the Dutch East India ====
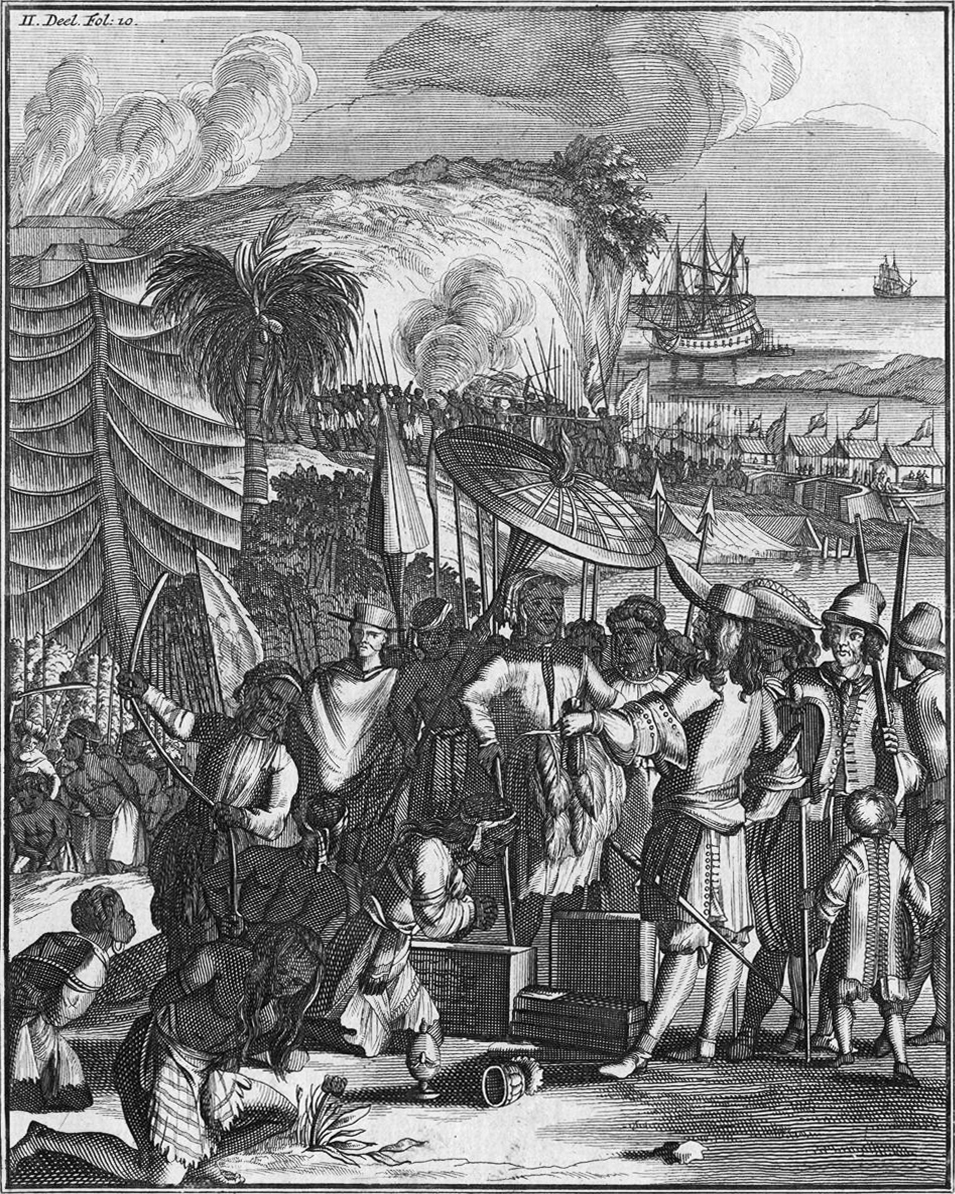
Natives of Arakan sell slaves to the Dutch East India Company, c. 1663 CE.

Mrauk U had economic relations with the Dutch East India Company (VOC) during the 17th century by trade, military collaboration, and occasional tensions. The Dutch first initiated trade relations with Mrauk U in 1608, signaling the beginning of their commercial interest in the region. By 1610, they established their first trade settlement, or ‘factory,’ in Mrauk U, capitalizing on the kingdom's strategic location along the Bay of Bengal and its bustling markets.

The primary motivation for the Dutch presence in Mrauk U was economic. The VOC aimed to engage in trade, particularly in goods such as rice, ivory, elephants, tree sap, cotton, spices, textiles, and slaves. However, their engagement was also linked to military considerations, as the Arakanese kingdom had a powerful war fleet that conducted raids, often with the support of Portuguese and Dutch mercenaries.

Cultural and religious interactions did occur during the Dutch presence in the kingdom. The presence of both Portuguese and Dutch traders and mercenaries contributed to the cultural diversity in Mrauk U. However, it is clear that the primary motive for the Dutch presence was economic, and cultural exchanges were secondary to their commercial activities.

In September 1627, a Rakhine embassy reached Batavia (now Jakarta) with a letter from the king assuring to increase its trade with the Dutch.

By 1665, the Dutch influence in Mrauk U began to decline. Several factors contributed to this, including shifts in regional power dynamics, changes in trade routes, and internal challenges within the VOC itself. The loss of significant territories such as Chittagong in 1666 to the Mughals, further weakened the kingdom's economic stability leading to the gradual withdrawal of the Dutch from southeastern Bengal and a decline in commercial activities in the region.

==== Relations with Ceylon ====
The Arakanese kings had minimal relations with Ceylon (present-day Sri Lanka), primarily focused on religion and Buddhist influences. Some notable ties are:

- Ba Saw Phyu established strong religious ties with Ceylon, which presented him with the Tripiṭaka, the revered scriptures of Theravada Buddhism. He constructed the Mahabodhi Shwe-Gu Temple as a symbol of his devotion.
- Min Razagyi expanded the Andaw-thein Ordination Hall to enshrine a tooth relic of the Buddha, which he brought back from his pilgrimage to Ceylon, either in 1596 or between 1606 and 1607.
- Min Phalaung constructed the Pitaka-Taik to store the Buddhist scriptures which he received from Ceylon.

The Shitthaung pillar inscription of Anandacandra records links between Arakan and Sri Lanka including donations to Sri Lankan monastic communities. In the 16th century, Sri Lankan King Vimaladhamma Suriya, concerned about the decline of Buddhism sent a mission to Arakan. As a result, the Arakanese monk Nandicakka traveled to Sri Lanka to perform the upasampadā ordination during which several members of the royal and noble families were ordained. Several bronze Buddha images of Sri Lankan origin were found at Koe-thaung Temple, including a miniature figure in the Avukana style. Additionally, two fine Sri Lankan-style bronzes were discovered near the Teza-rama Monastery at Shan-taung-myo.

=== Religious patronage ===
The kingdom was a center of Theravada Buddhism, with the monarchy actively supporting religious institutions. This patronage reinforced the king's legitimacy and promoted cultural development. The capital, Mrauk U, was renowned for its numerous temples and monasteries.

Due to proximity and help of Bengal, the Arakanese kings compared themselves to Sultans and fashioned themselves after Mughal rulers. They also employed some Indians and Muslims in prestigious positions within the royal administration. The court adopted some Indian and Islamic fashions from neighbouring Bengal. Syed Alaol and Daulat Qazi were prominent poets of Arakan.

The Portuguese missionaries also built churches and introduced Christian (Catholic) religious practices to the region, with little to no effect.

== Economy ==
Mrauk U thrived as a commercial hub engaging in trade with Arab, Dutch, Portuguese, and other merchants. The administration regulated trade, collected customs duties, and maintained diplomatic relations to bolster the kingdom's economy. The Rakhine kings are said to have spent a lot of money to hire Japanese warriors as their trusted bodyguards.

Sebastien Manrique, who visited the region in the early 1630s, estimated the city's population at 160,000 and likened its grandeur to that of Venice.

Agricultural development during this period was notable with techniques such as the construction of dams and embankments along rivers and the use of animal manure as fertilizer. The Mughal historian Shiabuddin Talish noted that while Portuguese pirates sold captives into slavery, the Arakanese employed them in agriculture and other services, thereby increasing the available labor force. Rice became the principal export crop, though it was also essential for local consumption. The kingdom derived much of its revenue from the rice trade. Animal husbandry developed alongside agriculture.

While the majority of Arakanese people were engaged in agriculture, the royal court took part in maritime trade. Some Arakanese became seafarers and traders, engaging with neighboring regions and conducting raids in the Ganges Delta. Unlike Burma and Siam, which used alloyed metals and silver in commerce, Arakan began minting its own coins. Alongside Arakanese coins, Mughal tangas were also used in Arakanese ports during the late sixteenth and early seventeenth centuries.

During the 16th and 17th centuries, Dutch and Portuguese traders traded with Mrauk U on the shipping route between India and the island of Java in Indonesia.

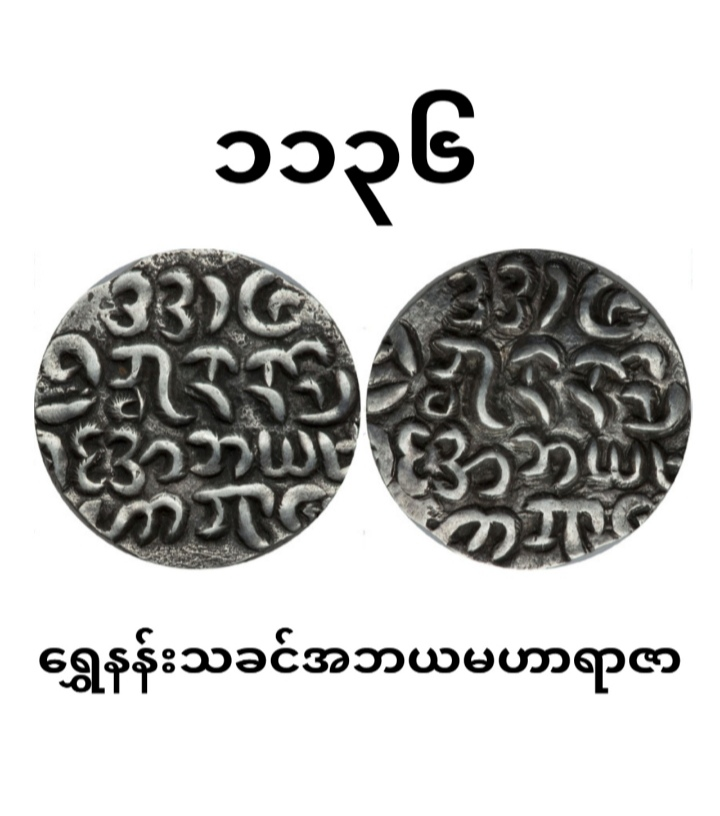
Arakanese Coin stamped by King Abhaya Maha Raza during 1774

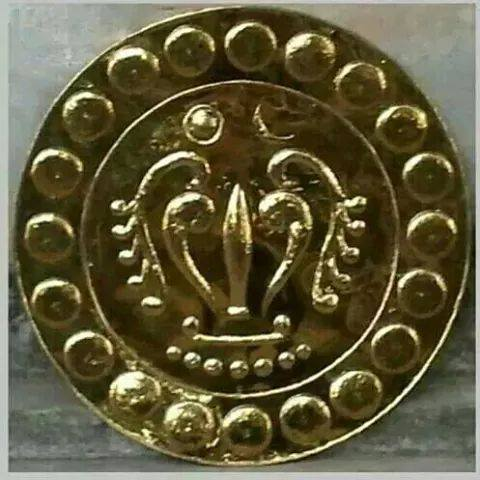
Arakan coin showing Hindu Shrivatsa symbol

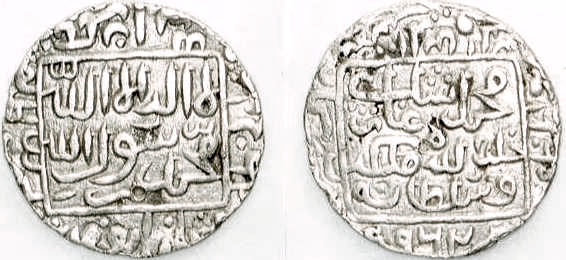
Coin of Arakan minted by Shams al-din Muhammad Ghazi, sultan of Bengal.

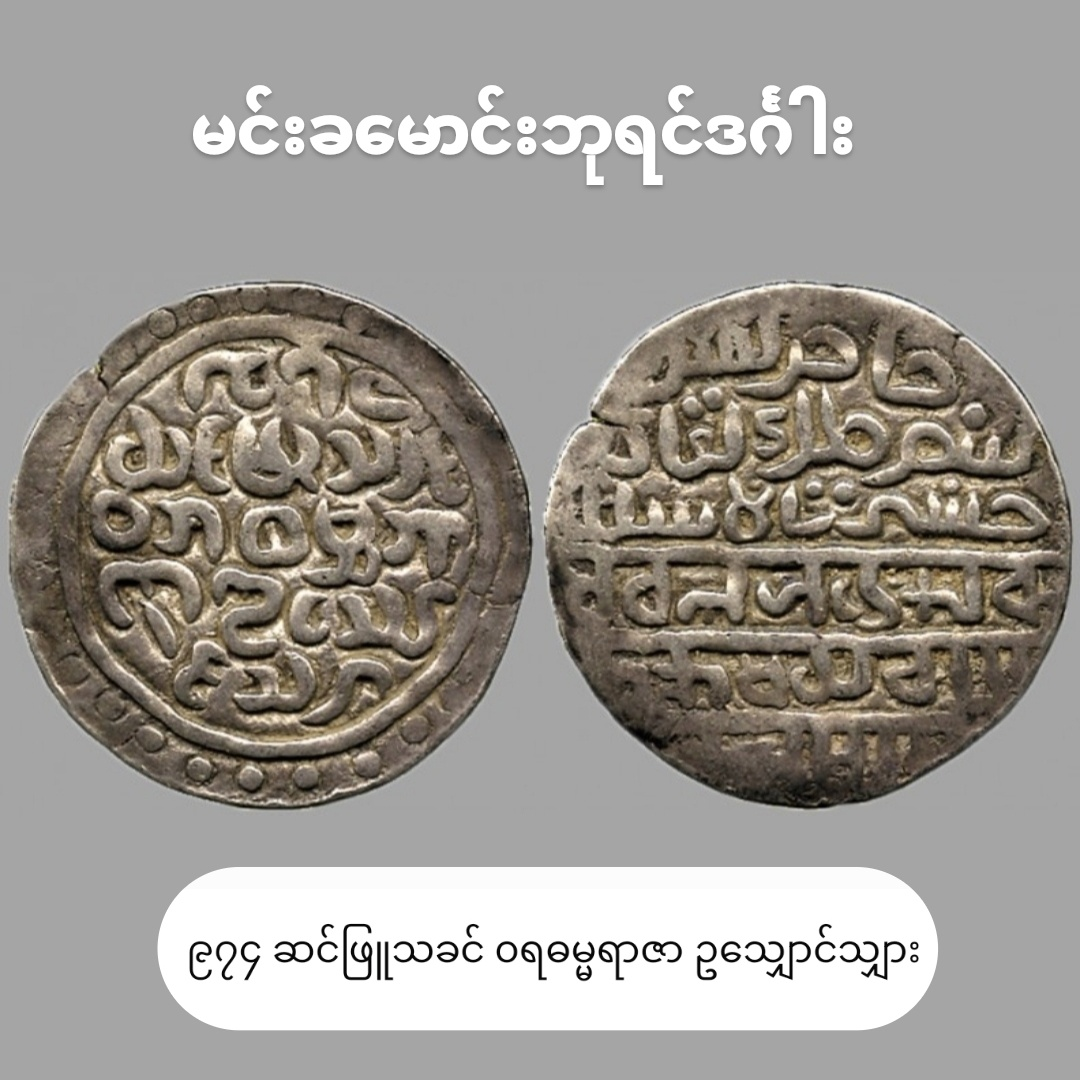
Arakanese coin during Min Khamaung (မင်းခမောင်း) reign

== Cultural legacy ==
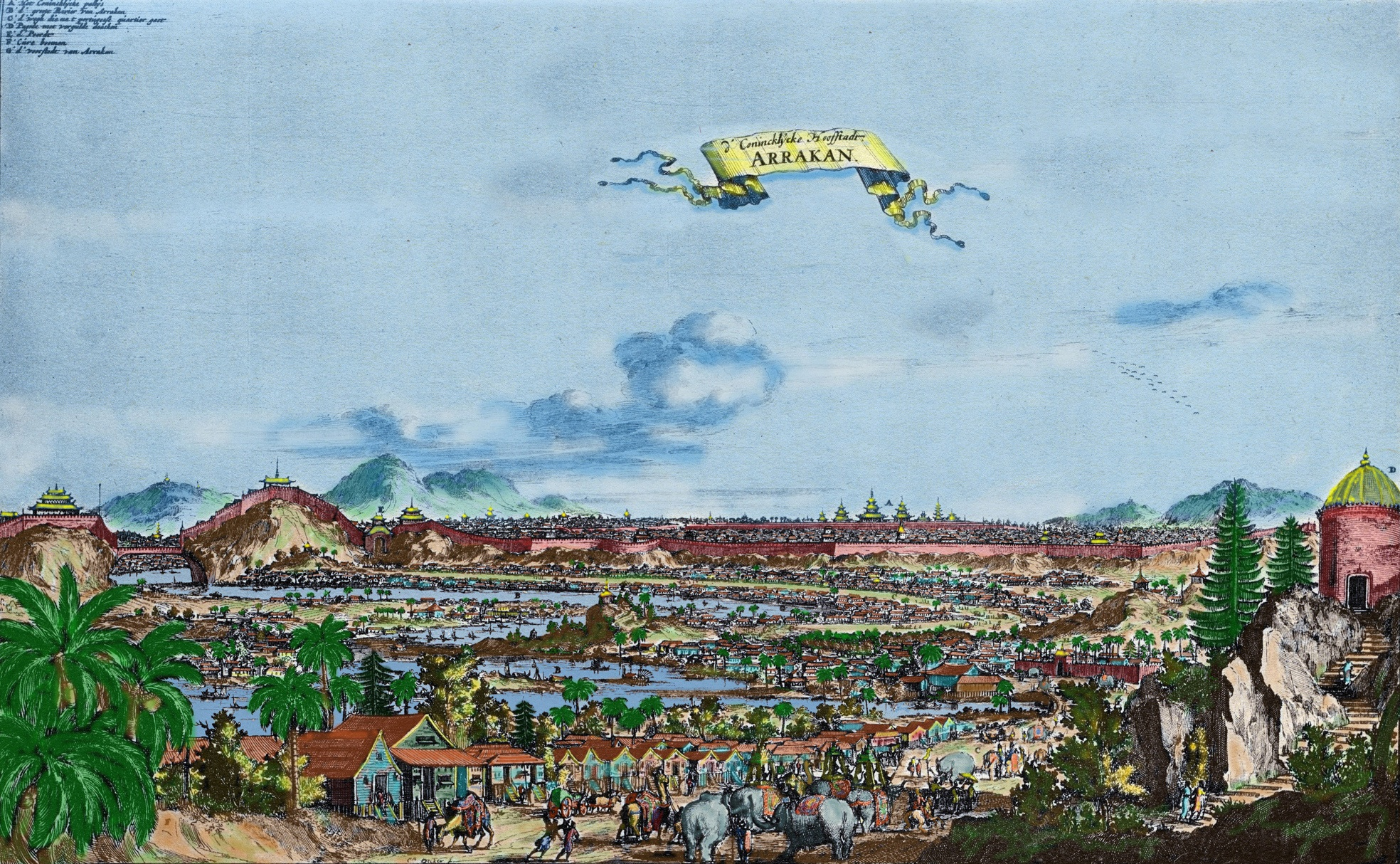
View of Mrauk-U in the 17th century

Mrauk-U is the longest-lived capital in Myanmar after Inwa. Arakanese chronicle records that more than six million shrines and pagodas flourished in Mrauk-U. A British archaeologist, Emil Forchhammer noted that "in durability, architectural skill, and ornamentation the Mrauk-U temples far surpass those on the banks of Irrawaddy." The English author Maurice Collis made Mrauk U and Rakhine famous with his book "The Land of the Great Image: Being experiences of Friar Manrique in Arakan" based on the accounts of Friar Manrique travels in Arakan.

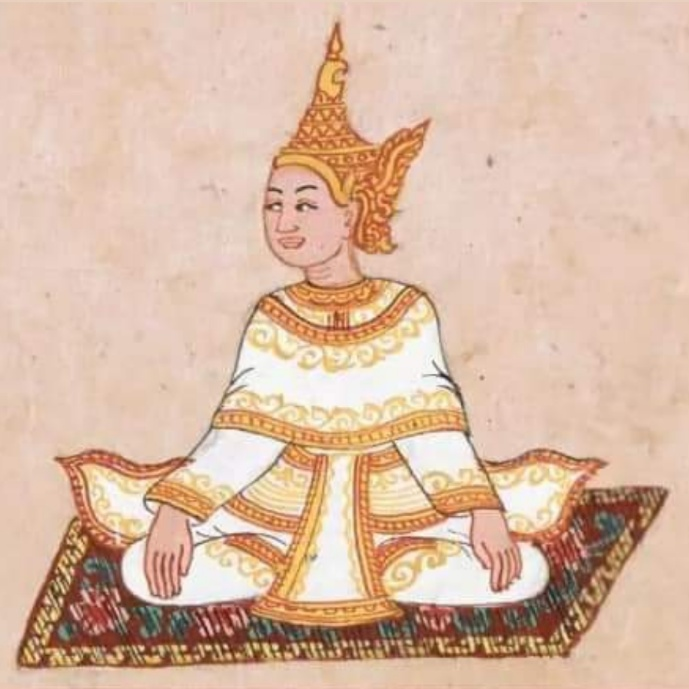
King Maha Thammada, the last king of Mrauk-U

Gold and silver coins serve as the heritage of the Mrauk-U period. The tradition of coin-making was handed down from the Vesali kings who started minting coins around the fifth century. The coins so far found are of one denomination only. Inscribed on the coins are the title of the ruling king and his year of coronation; coins before 1638 had Rakhine inscriptions on one side and Persian and Nagari inscriptions on the other. The inclusion of the foreign inscriptions was meant for the easy acceptance by the neighbouring countries and the Arab traders. Twenty-three types of silver coins and three types of gold coins have so far been found.

List of Temples Constructed during the Kingdom of Mrauk U
Temple Name	Constructed By	Date of Construction
Shite-thaung	King Min Bin	1535
Andaw Thein	King Thazata (ordination hall); King Min Bin (restoration); King Min Razagyi (temple)	Ordination hall: 1515–1521; Restoration: 1534–1542; Temple: 1596–1607
Htukkanthein	King Min Phalaung	1571
Koe-thaung	King Dikkha	1554–1556
Ratanabon	King Min Khamaung	1612
Nyi Daw	King Min Khayi	1433
Le-myet-hna Temple	King Min Saw Mon	1430
Mingalar Man Aung Pagoda	Son and heir of King Sanda Thudhamma Raza	1685
Yadanar Man Aung Pagoda	King Sanda Thudhamma Yaza and Queen Yadana Piya Dewi	1658
Sakya-Man-Aung Temple	King Thiri Thudhamma Raza	1629
Laung Bwann Brauk Pagoda	King Minkhaung Raza King Thiri Thudhamma	1525 1625
Zina Man Aung Pagoda	King Sanda Thudhamma	1625
Htupayon Pagoda	King Min Ran Aung	1494
Lawka Man Aung Pagoda	Sanda Thudhamma	1658
Shwe-Gu Mahabodhi Temple	King Ba Saw Phyu	1460s

The historical ruins of the Mrauk U Kingdom include over 700 ancient temples and pagodas nestled amidst lush hills in Myanmar's Rakhine State. Notable sites include the Shitthaung Pagoda, known as the "Temple of 80,000 Buddhas", the tooth-shrine temple of Andaw-thein, and the fortress-like Htukkanthein Temple.

Tibetan records also suggest a consistent and ongoing exchange of monks between Arakan, Bengal and Tibet, where this interaction reaching its peak in the 16th century. The earliest examples of this particular image type may have originated in Tibet during the early 15th century, possibly brought from Bengal by Min Saw Mon upon his return to reclaim Arakan from the Burmans.

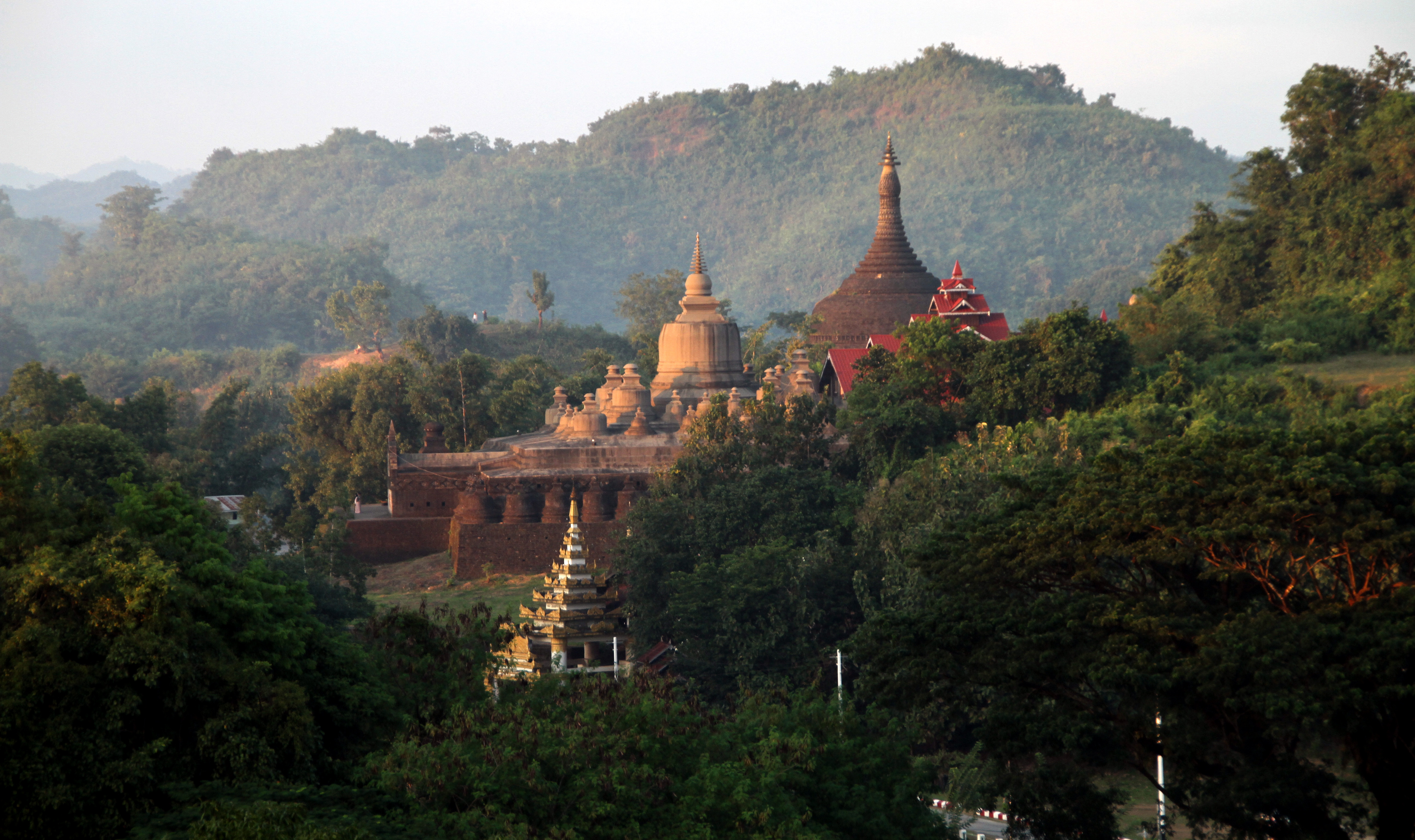
Shite Thaung Temple

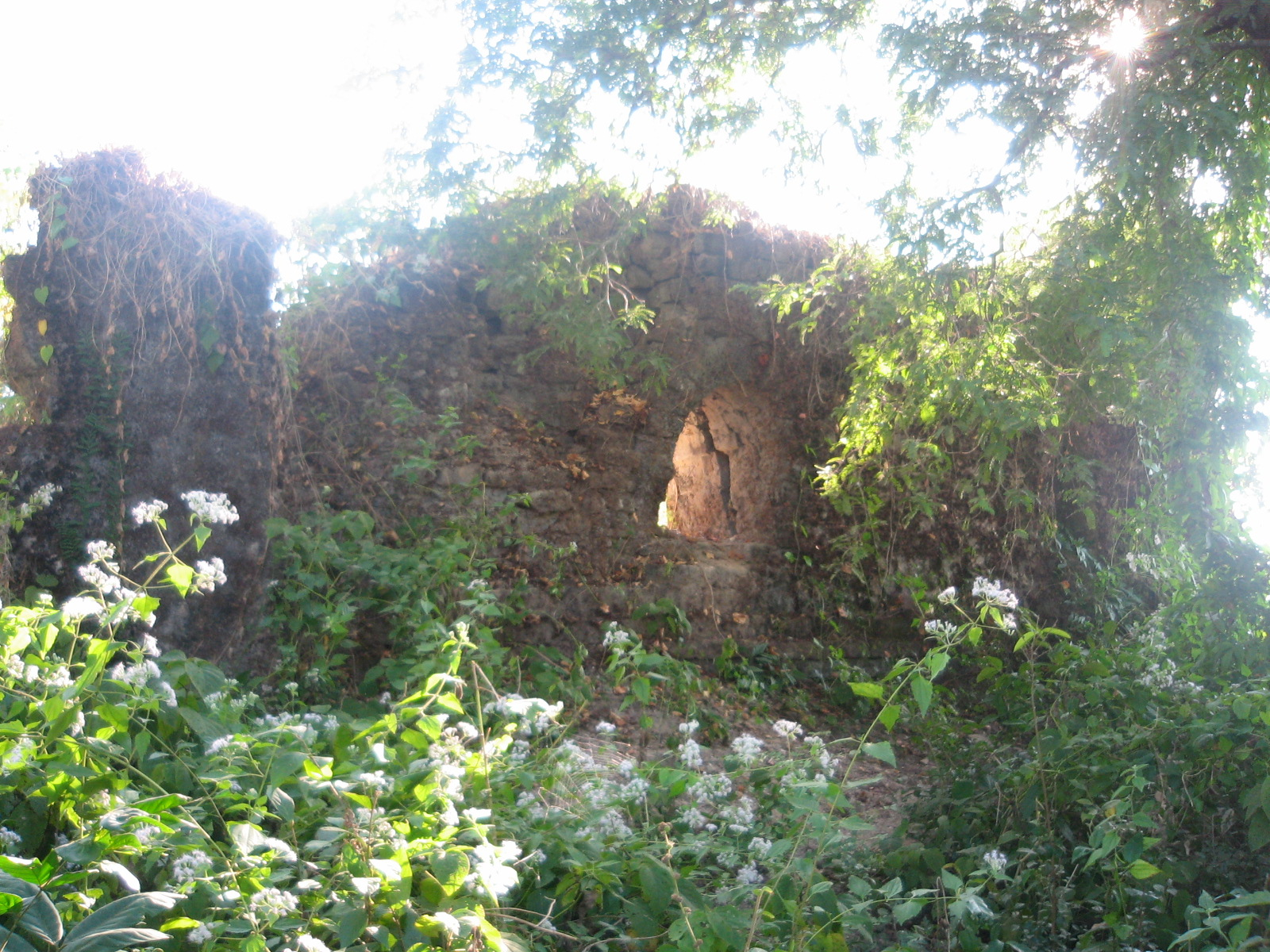
Portuguese office

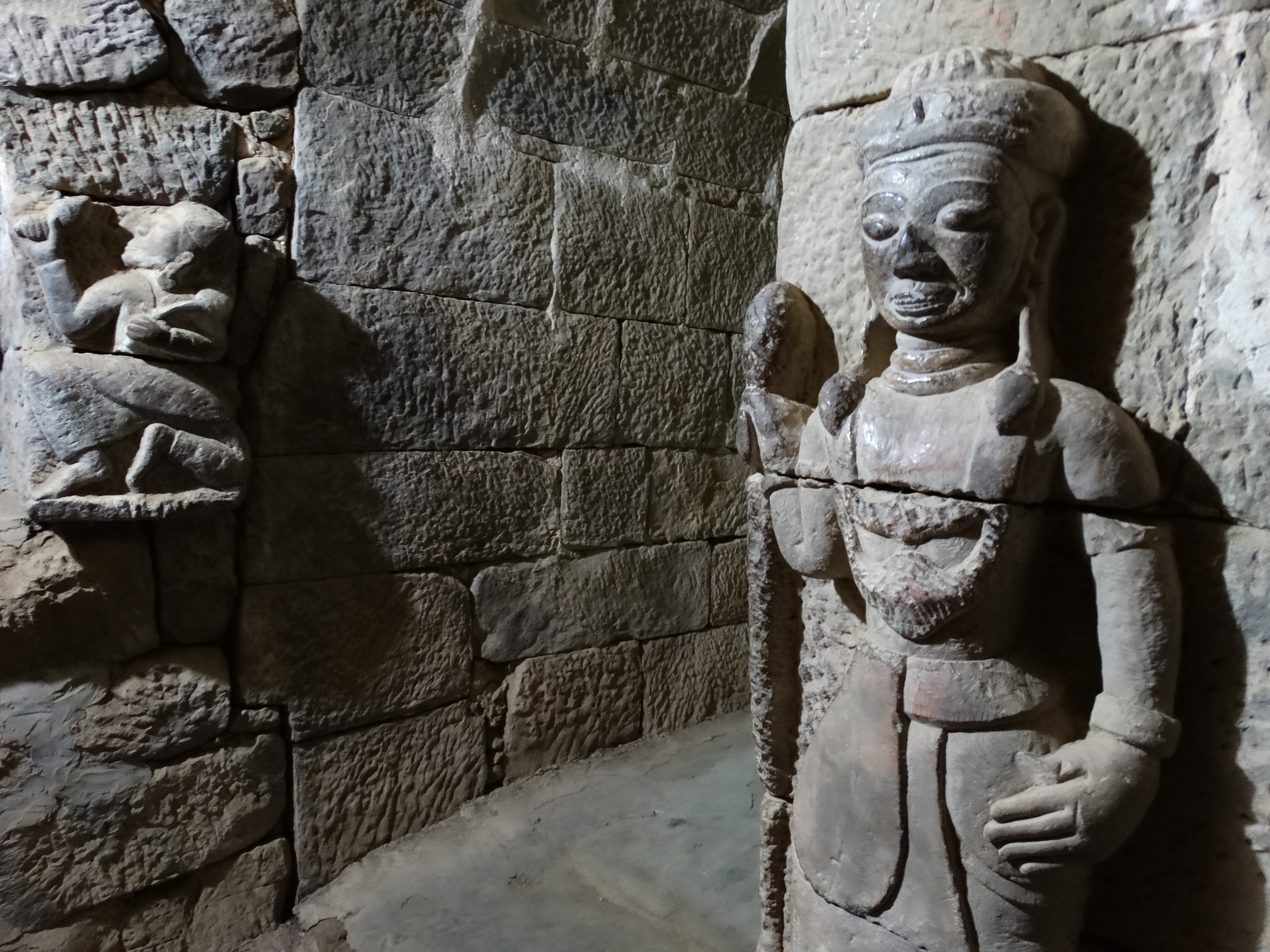
Interior Chamber of Dukkanthein Paya

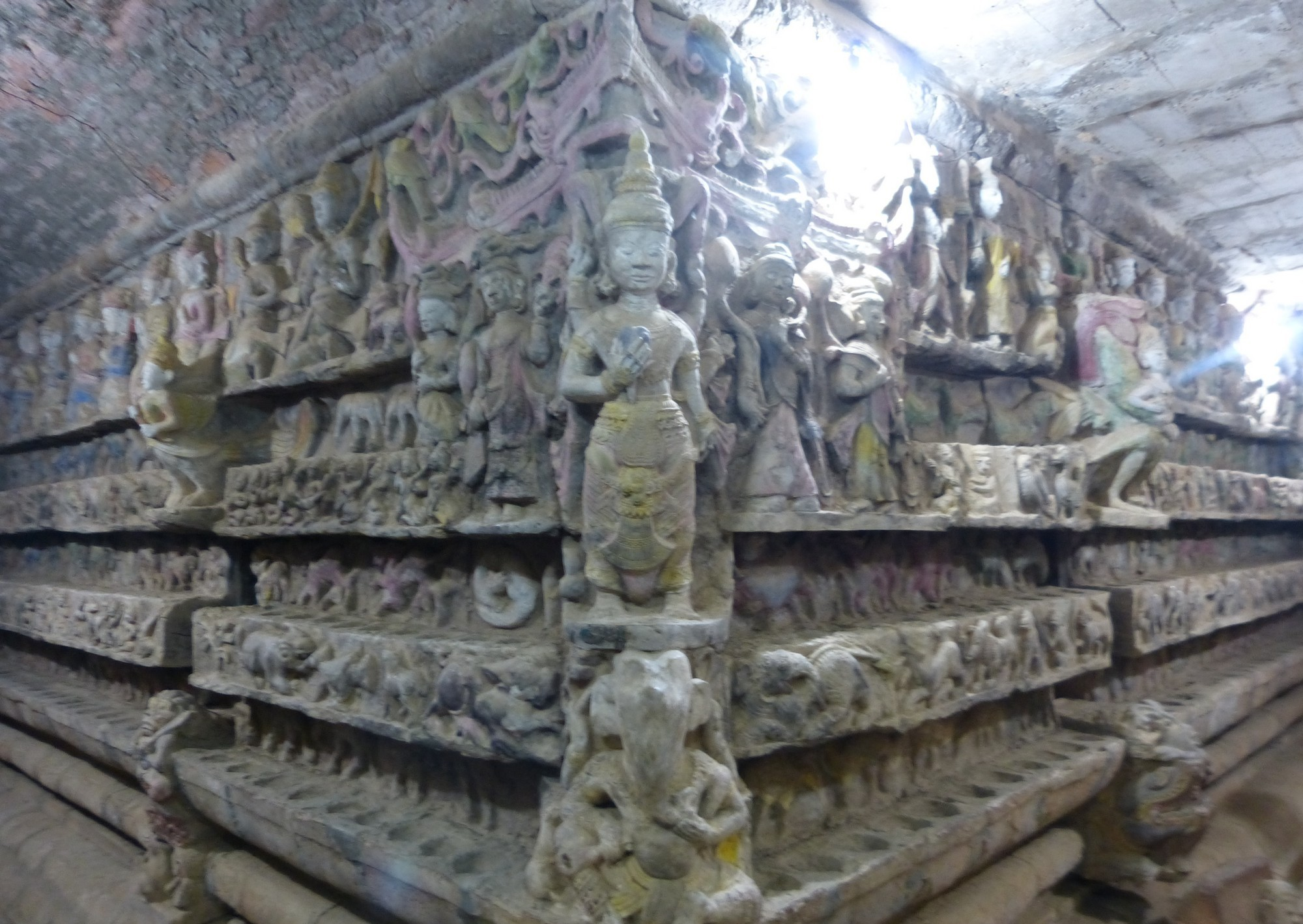
Depictions of Arakan kings in Shitthaung temple

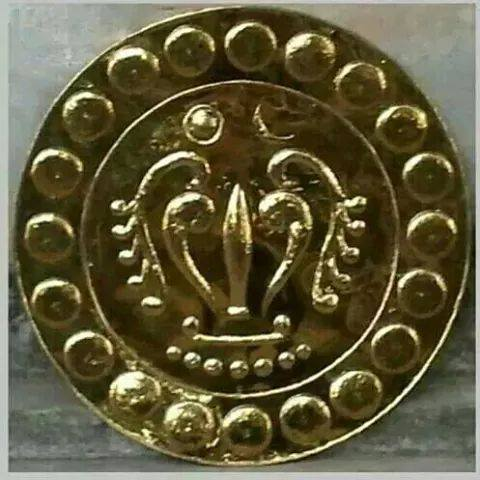
Arakan Coin

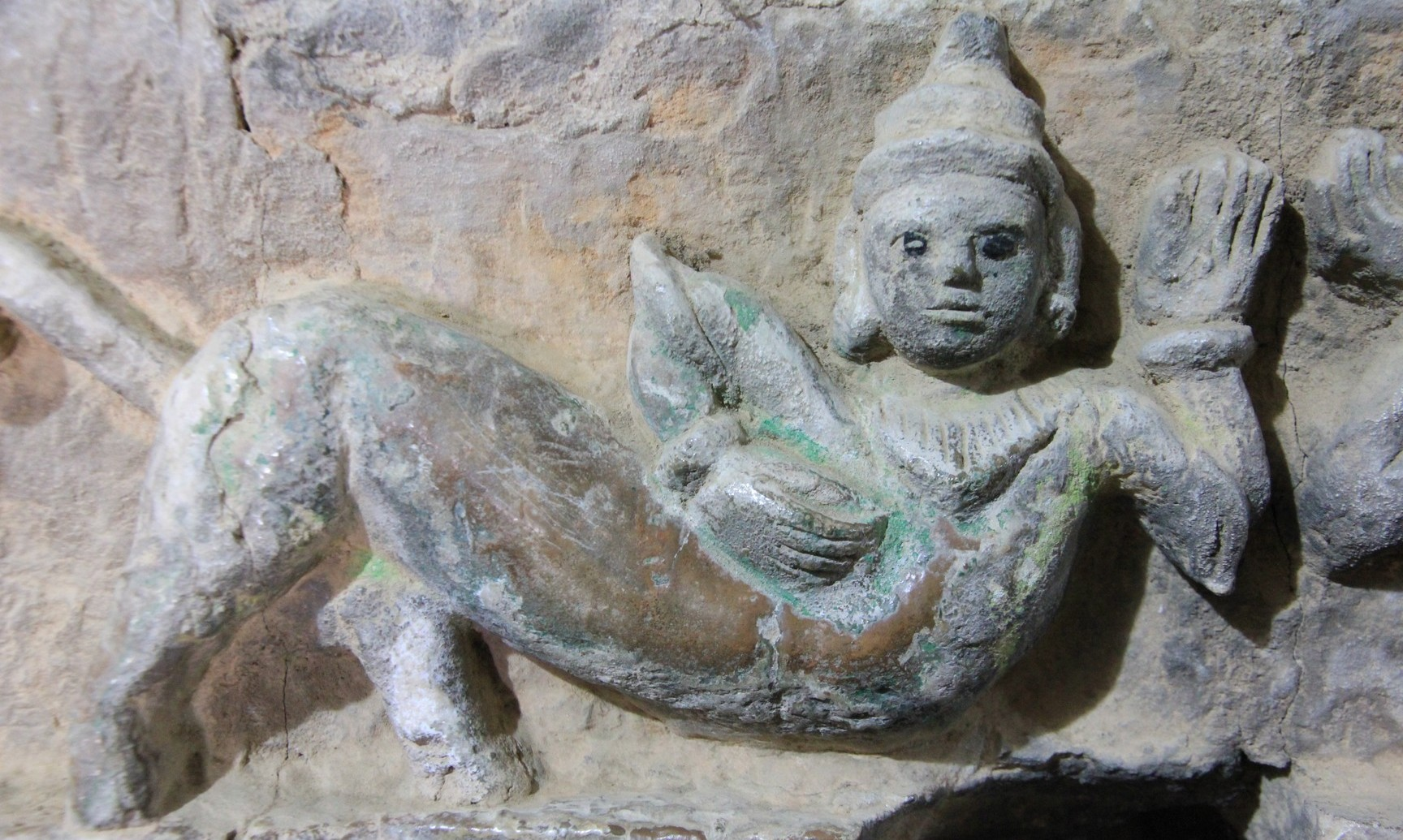
Historical ruins of Mrauk U

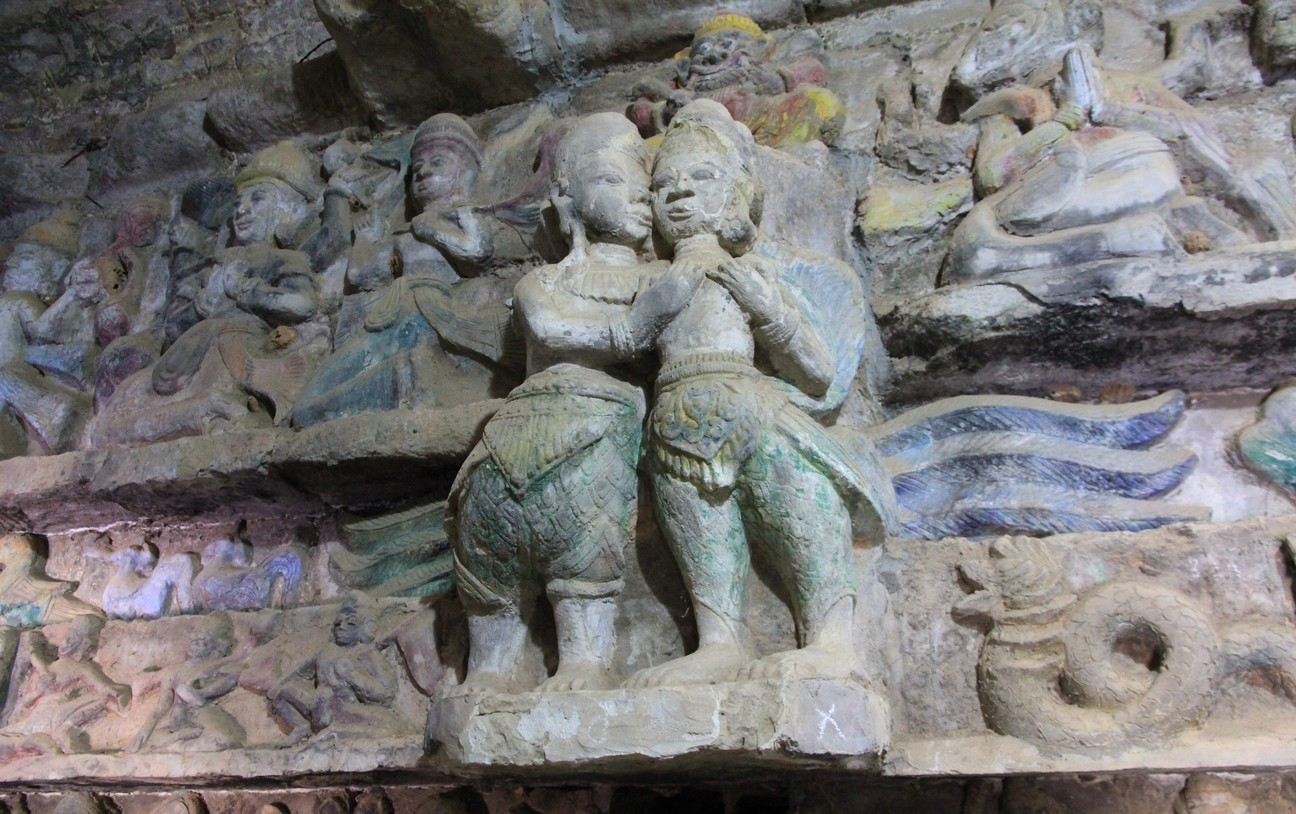
Historial Ruins of Mrauk U

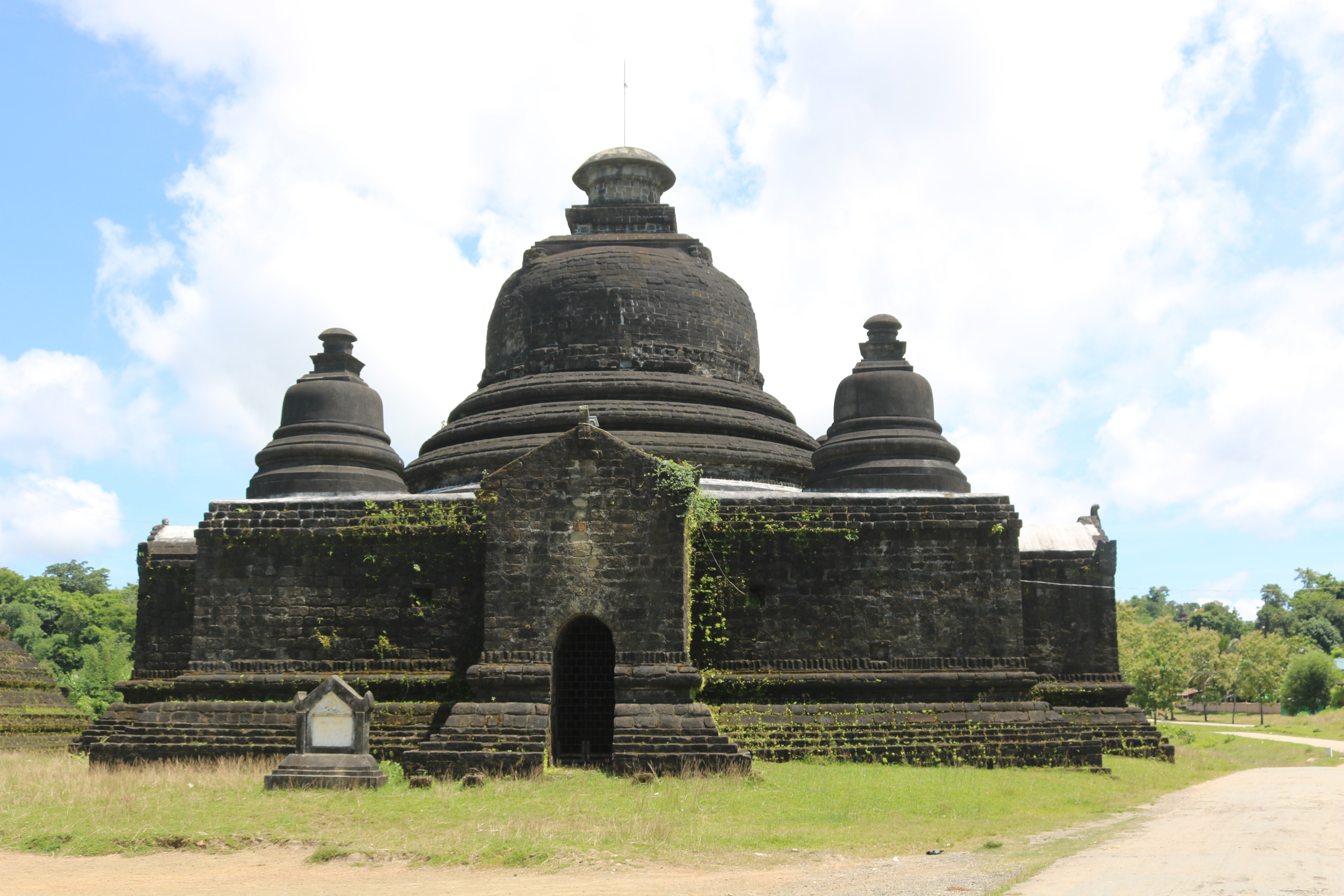
Le Myet Hna Temple of Mrauk U

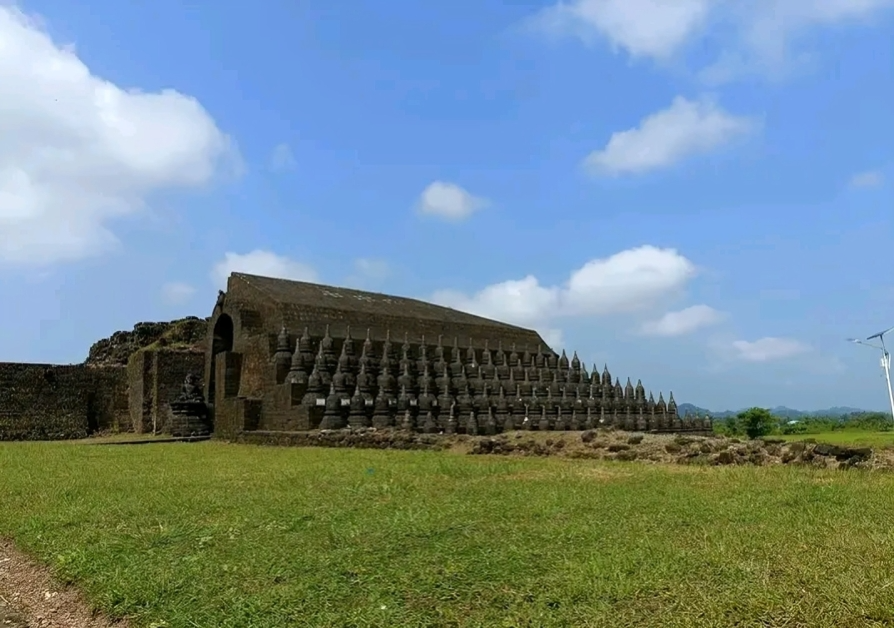
Temple of 90,000 Buddha Images

== See also ==
- List of Arakanese monarchs
  - Arakanese monarchs' family tree
- History of Rakhine
- History of Chittagong
- History of Burma

== Bibliography ==
- Aye Chan (2005). "The Development of a Muslim Enclave in Arakan (Rakhine) State of Burma (Myanmar)" (PDF). SOAS Bulletin of Burma Research. 3 (2). Archived from the original (PDF) on 12 July 2013.
- Charney, Michael W. (1993). 'Arakan, Min Yazagyi, and the Portuguese: The Relationship Between the Growth of Arakanese Imperial Power and Portuguese Mercenaries on the Fringe of Mainland Southeast Asia 1517–1617.' Masters dissertation, Ohio University.
- Hall, D.G.E. (1960). Burma (3rd ed.). Hutchinson University Library.
- Harvey, G. E. (1925). History of Burma: From the Earliest Times to 10 March 1824. London: Frank Cass & Co. Ltd.
- Htin Aung, Maung (1967). A History of Burma. New York and London: Columbia University Press.
- Gutman, Pamela (2006). Burma's Lost Kingdoms: Splendours of Arakan. ISBN 9789748304984.
- Maung Maung Tin (1905). Konbaung Hset Maha Yazawin (in Burmese). Vol. 2 (2004 ed.). Yangon: Department of Universities History Research, University of Yangon.
- Myat Soe, ed. (1964). Myanma Swezon Kyan (in Burmese). Vol. 9 (1 ed.). Yangon: Sarpay Beikman.
- Myint-U, Thant (2006). The River of Lost Footsteps—Histories of Burma. Farrar, Straus and Giroux. ISBN 978-0-374-16342-6.
- Phayre, Lt. Gen. Sir Arthur P. (1883). History of Burma (1967 ed.). London: Susil Gupta.
- Sandamala Likara, Ashin (1931). Rakhine Razawin Thit (in Burmese). Vol. 2 (1997 ed.). Yangon: Tetlan Sarpay.
- Yegar, Moshe (2002). Between integration and secession: The Muslim communities of the Southern Philippines, Southern Thailand and Western Burma / Myanmar. Lanham, MD: Lexington Books. ISBN 0739103563.
- Encyclopædia Britannica. 1984 Edition. Vol. VII, p. 76
