= Launggyet =

Launggyet လောင်းကြက်မြို့
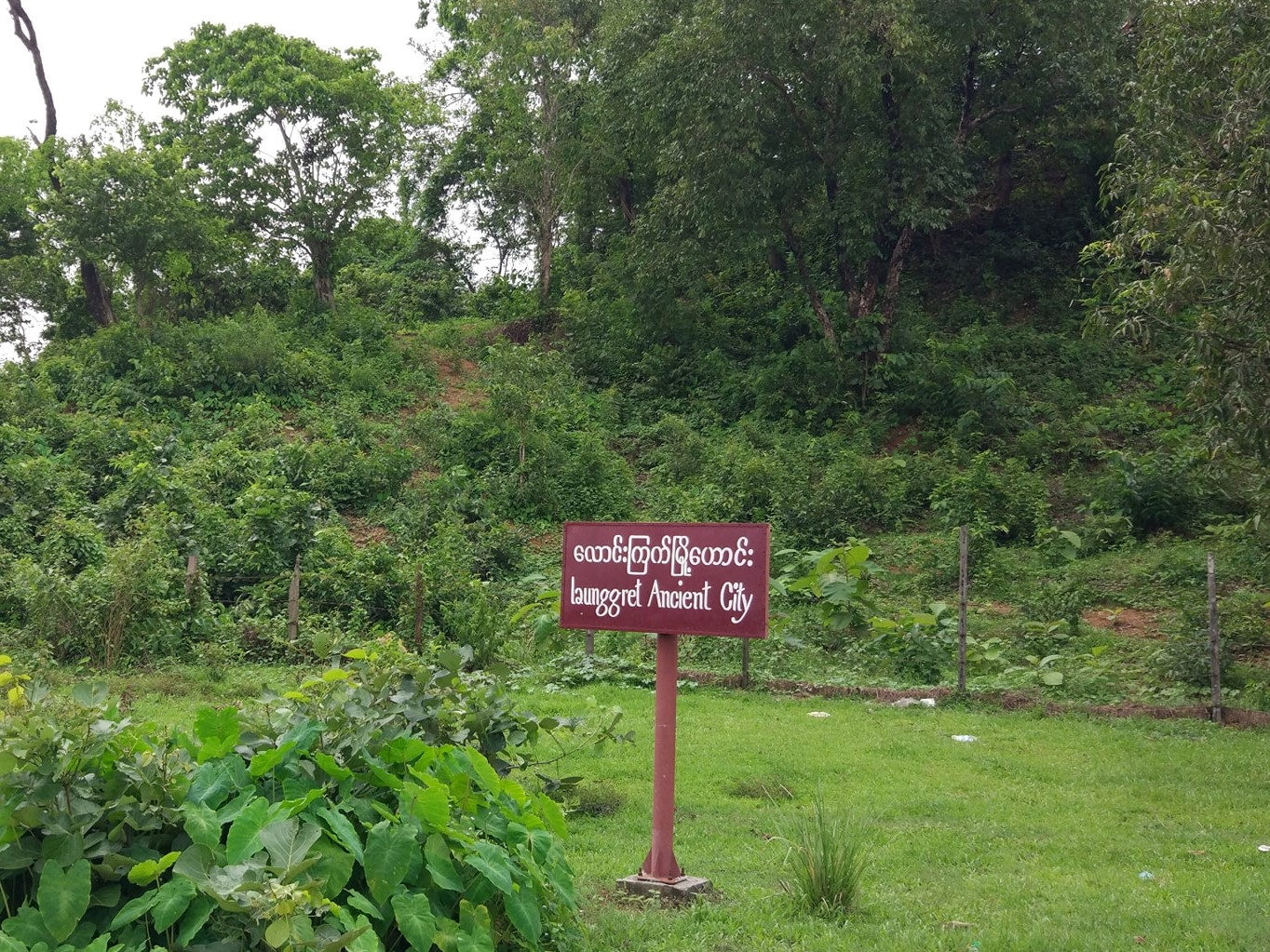

- Location in Burma
- Coordinates: 20°32′41.32″N 93°14′33.45″E
- country: Myanmar
- State: Rakhine State
- Founded: 22 April 1251
- Time zone: UTC+6.30 (MMT)

Launggyet (Burmese: လောင်းကြက်မြို့ [láʊɰ̃ ɡjɛʔ mjo̰]) is a former capital of the Launggyet Dynasty of Arakan from 1237/1251 to 1430. It is also last capital of Laymro Kingdom. The former capital site is located a few miles northwest of Mrauk U, Rakhine State, Myanmar. The Arakanese chronicle Rakhine Razawin Thit gives the foundation date as 22 April 1251. (Note: (Sandamala Linkara Vol. 1 1997: 171): The city was founded on Saturday, 2nd waxing of Nayon 613 ME (Saturday, 22 April 1251.)) Some Arakanese chronicles give the foundation date as 1237 CE.

Following the death of King Nganalon, his son Prince Alawmaphyu succeeded him in 1250. He reigned for one year at the capital of Nyeinzara Toungoo, at which point he realized that it was time for foundation of a new city.

== Bibliography ==
- Harvey, G. E. (1925). History of Burma: From the Earliest Times to 10 March 1824. London: Frank Cass & Co. Ltd.
- Sandamala Linkara, Ashin (1931). Rakhine Yazawinthit Kyan (in Burmese). Vol. 1–2 (1997–1999 ed.). Yangon: Tetlan Sarpay.

Launggyet
Preceded by Parein	Last capital, Kingdom of Arakan (Launggyet dynasty); 1251–1430	Succeeded by Mrauk-U (Mrauk-U Kingdom, est.1429)
