= Prince Blucher (1815 ship) =

British ship (1815–1821)

History

United Kingdom
- Name: Prince Blucher
- Namesake: Prince Blucher
- Owner: C. Blaney
- Launched: 1815, Chittagong
- Fate: Wrecked 1821; broken up in 1824

General characteristics
- Type: Ship
- Tons burthen: 691, (bm)
- Propulsion: Sail
- Notes: Teak-built

Prince Blucher was launched at Chittagong in 1815. She made one voyage for the British East India Company. She participated in two and possibly three rescues, one particularly notable, and was wrecked in 1821. Condemned, she was laid up and later broken up in 1824.

== Career ==
First rescue – Frances Charlotte: Frances Charlotte left Batavia on 18 September 1816 bound for Bengal, carrying the 78th Highlanders regiment, together with their wives and children. On 5 November Frances Charlotte struck a sunken reef off Preparis. On 10 November Prince Blucher, Captain Weathrall, was sailing in the vicinity when she spied wreckage. Weathrall investigated and when he saw a signal fire stopped to render assistance. Between 11 and 14 November Prince Blucher was able to rescue some 316 men, women, and children before bad weather forced her to leave. She took the survivors to Calcutta, where the Bengal Government dispatched two cruisers to rescue the 130 or so remaining survivors.

At Calcutta, Weathrall and his men received great praise for their efforts. The Governor-General, on behalf of the government of Bengal, awarded Weathrall 5000 sicca rupees for plate. It also awarded money to his officers and crew. The merchants of Calcutta awarded Weathrall with an engraved silver plate.

EIC voyage (1817): Captain M. T. Weathrall sailed from Calcutta on 1 February 1817. Prince Blucher reached the Cape of Good Hope on 29 April, and arrived at Portsmouth on 30 June. She had carried some of the surviving 78th Highlanders.

Second rescue: Captain Weathrall sailed Prince Blucher from England on 23 August and Madeira on 21 September. On 21 January 1818 she encountered at 20°00′N 87°56′E a boat of pilgrims that had been driven out to sea from Saugor some nine day earlier. They were completely without food or water. Eight had died, two died after Prince Blucher got them aboard, and one more died thereafter. Still, Weathrall was able to bring safely into Calcutta, "eight Brahmans, four women, and twenty-six Bengalees".

In 1818 Captain James Henry Johnston took command of Prince Blucher. In her he sailed twice to London.

Third rescue: On 7 February 1819, Iris, Jones, master, wrecked on Canda Island, on her way from London to Bombay. (Canda, or Candy, or Candu Island does not exist.) Contemporary accounts believed that the island was east of the Chagos Archipelago.) Lloyd's List reported on 13 August 1819, that Iris had wrecked on "Solomon or Canda Island"; this would suggest that "Solomon Island" was the Salomon Islands, a small atoll in the Chagos Archipelago. Lloyd's List further reported that Prince Blucher had rescued Jones and some of the crew but that the rest of Iris's crew had remained on the island, and it was expected that most of the cargo would be saved. Prince Blucher had taken with her 40,000 dollars that Iris had been carrying. The Asiatic Journal... has an account of the wrecking and a subsequent dispute between Captain Lewis Jones and Captain Lagour, master of a French schooner, respecting compensation for passage for Jones and some of his crew to India. The account makes no mention of Prince Blucher.

Lloyd's List reported on 23 June 1820, that Prince Blucher, Johnston, master, had arrived in England from Bengal. She had left Bengal on 11 February 1820, and reached the Cape of Good Hope on 5 April. She left the Cape on 18 April, and reached Ascension Island on 5 May. On the morning of 22 June Prince Blucher grounded on the Shivering Sands in the Thames Estuary. That afternoon some smacks got her off; she arrived in the Thames River on the 24th.

Prince Blucher, Johnston, master, left London on 24 September and arrived at Bengal on 13 February 1821.

== Loss ==
On 3 May 1821 Prince Blucher sailed from Bengal for Mauritius. She then stranded on the James and Mary Shoal in the Ganges River. She was refloated but was so badly damaged she had to be taken back to Calcutta. There she was condemned in June and laid up. She was finally broken up in 1824 at Fort Gloster. Her entry in Lloyd's Register for 1823 carried the annotation "condemned".
