= Min Phalaung =

Min Phalaung မင်းဖလောင်း

King of Arakan
- Reign: 7 February 1572 – 4 July [O.S. 24 June] 1593
- Predecessor: Sekkya
- Successor: Raza II
- Chief Minister: Maha Pyinnya Kyaw
- Born: 27 February 1535; Saturday, 10th waning of Tabaung 896 ME (Note: (Sandamala Linkara Vol. 2 1999: 48): He was born on the Saturday during the Portuguese raid on Mrauk-U. (Sandamala Linkara Vol. 2 1999: 31) says the raid reached outskirts of Mrauk-U on Saturday, 10th waxing of Tabaung 896, which translates to Thursday, 11 February 1535. The date was most likely 10th waning (not waxing) of Tabaung 896, which translates to Saturday, 27 February 1535.); Mrauk-U
- Died: 4 July 1593 (aged 58); Sunday, 6th waxing of Waso 955 ME; Mrauk-U
- Consort: Saw Mi Taw (Chief queen); Saw Thanda; Saw Latt; Saw Oo
- Issue: Raza II; Thado Minsaw; Kinzana Dewi (daughter); Shin Ma (daughter); Salat Dewi (daughter)
Names
- Min Phalaung (မင်းဖလောင်း); Sikandar Shah
- House: Min Bin
- Father: Min Bin
- Mother: Saw Shin
- Religion: Theravada Buddhism

Min Phalaung (Burmese: မင်းဖလောင်း, Burmese pronunciation: [mɪ́ɴ pʰəláʊɴ]; also spelled Min Hpalaung; 27 February 1535 – 4 July [O.S. 24 June] 1593) was king of Arakan from 1572 to 1593.

== Reign ==
Min Phalaung presided over the continued rise of Arakan, begun under his father King Min Bin. He extended his realm to India Tripura (1575) and Bengal (1586–1587), and withstood a major invasion by Toungoo Burma (1580–1581). He completely stayed out of the chaos in Toungoo Burma in the following years. Phalaung left a prosperous and confident kingdom to his son Raza II, who succeeded him in 1593. He was married to own sister Saw Mi Taw.

== Early life ==
Min Phalaung was born to King Min Bin and Queen Saw Shin of Mrauk-U on 27 February 1535 (Saturday, 10th waning of Tabaung 896 ME). His birth name was Phwa-Daw Htwe (ဖွားတော်ထွေး, Burmese pronunciation: [pʰwá dɔ̀ tʰwé]; "Royal Youngest Birth") as he was the youngest child of the king. Because he was born during the raid on Mrauk-U by the Portuguese, called "Phalaung" in Arakanese, the young prince became known by the nickname Min Phalaung ("Prince Portuguese"). He was given the town of Sittantin (စစ်တံတင်) in fief. He grew up at a time when his father was turning the coastal kingdom into a major regional power. In 1546–1547, the young prince, not yet 12 years old, was given the command of an army battalion to battle the invading Toungoo armies. He was married to his half-sister Saw Mi Taw, whose mother was a granddaughter of King Khayi (r. 1433–1459), by their father.

He additionally took the traditional title of Sikandar Shah.

== Accession ==
After Min Bin died in 1554, he remained governor of Sittantin, loyally serving under his half-brother Dikkha (r. 1554–1556), his paternal nephews King Saw Hla (r. 1556–1564) and King Sekkya (r. 1564–1572). In 1572, King Sekkya suddenly died, and the court chose Phalaung as king. At the coronation ceremony, Phalaung, who was styled as Sikandar Shah, the Sultan of Bengal, took Sekkya's daughter Saw Shin Latt (his first cousin, twice removed) as queen. He also married Saw Thanda, who had been queen of the previous three kings including his father. He made his eldest son Thado Dhamma Raza his heir-apparent, and his second son the chief of the armed forces.

== Reign ==
By his accession, Arakan had been firmly established as a major power in the region. The coastal kingdom thus far had focused its energies on controlling the Bay of Bengal coastline from the Sundarbans in Bengal to Cape Negrais with its powerful navy, armed with Portuguese mercenaries and munitions. Its eastern policy had been not to attract the attention of Toungoo Dynasty, which under King Bayinnaung was assembling the largest empire in the history of Southeast Asia.

=== Wars ===
==== Tripura (1575) ====
Phalaung largely continued this policy, and tried to exert control over northern Bengal and Tripura, which Arakanese kings had never had lasting control. In January 1575, (Note: (Sandamala Linkara Vol. 2 1999: 49): The army and the navy left to the front on Saturday, 2nd waxing of Tabodwe 936 ME, which translates to Thursday (not Saturday), 13 January 1575. It is a typographical error. The more likely date is either 12th waxing of Tabodwe (Sunday, 23 January) or 2nd waning of Tabodwe (Friday, 28 January).) he sent a well-armed expeditionary force led by Crown Prince Thado Dhamma Raza to Tripura. The Arakanese forces easily captured the Tripuri capital, after which Tripura agreed to pay tribute. He kept a strong garrison at Chittagong, manned by a large number of Portuguese seamen and mercenaries. Every year, the king sent troops in hundreds of boats, fully stocked with munitions, to Chittagong while the garrison of the previous year returned to Mrauk-U.

==== Toungoo invasion (1580–1581) ====
The greatest challenge to his kingdom came in 1580 when the long-awaited invasion from Toungoo finally came. On 9 September 1580 (1st waxing of Thadingyut 942 ME), Toungoo army and naval forces (24,000 troops, 1200 horses, 120 elephants, 1300 boats) led by Thiri Thudhamma Yaza, son of Bayinnaung and governor of Martaban, quickly seized Thandwe (Sandoway). As with the 1546–1547 invasion, Toungoo forces advanced up to Mrauk-U but could not break through the well fortified fort. Unlike the previous invasion, Toungoo forces were prepared for the long haul, and laid siege to the city for over a year. However, the invasion was called off after Bayinnaung died in November 1581.

==== Northern Bengal and Tripura (1586–1587) ====
After the war, he continued the policy of not interfering in the eastern affairs even when King Nanda, the successor of Bayinnaung, struggled mightily, and increasingly unsuccessfully, to keep the massive Toungoo Empire intact. The Arakanese king's attention remained close to home. He faced a serious rebellion in 1586 when the governor of Chittagong in league with some Portuguese and Indian mercenaries raised a rebellion. The governor had been unhappy with Thado Minsaw, the second son of the king, who had recently been appointed King of Bengal (Anauk Bayin). The governor had received aid from a northern state of Uttara Raj (ဥတ္တရာဇ်, Burmese pronunciation: [ʔoʊʔ tə ɹɪʔ]; lit. "Northern Kingdom" in Pali) in northern Bengal. The rebellion also spread to Tripura.

On 19 November [O.S. 9 November] 1586 (Wednesday, 9th waxing of Natdaw 948 ME), (Note: (Sandamala Linkara Vol. 2 1999: 51) says the invasion began on Wednesday, 6th waxing of Natdaw 948 ME, which translates to Sunday, 16 November 1586. It is a typographical error. The correct date is most probably Wednesday, 9th waxing of Natdaw 948 ME, which translates to Wednesday, 19 November 1586. The shapes of Burmese numbers 6 (၆) and 9 (၉) are very close, and can be easily mis-copied.) he led the army and the navy to suppress the rebellions. Chittagong was taken without a fight as the mercenaries of the rebellious governor of Chittagong abandoned him, and the governor was found dead. After a brief stay at Chittagong, the army left for Uttara Raj (northern Bengal) on 24 December 1586 (full moon of Pyatho 948 ME). The army faced no serious opposition in both Uttara Raj and in Tripura. Within two weeks, both states submitted. However, the effective control of the Arakanese king may not have reached that far. According to the British historian Arthur Purves Phayre Phalaung realm probably stretched only to Noakhali, and Tripura.

=== Construction works ===
The king built a new palace, which he first entered with a lavish ceremony on 8 September 1577 (Sunday, 11th waning of Tawthalin 939 ME). (Note: (Sandamala Linkara Vol. 2 1999: 49) gives Sunday, 1st waning of Tawthalin 939. But it certainly is a typographical error since 1st waning of Tawthalin 939 (29 August 1577) was a Thursday. The correct date is more likely 11th waning of Tawthalin 939, which translates to Sunday, 8 September 1577.) Between 1585 and 1587, he commissioned the construction of 17 Buddhist pagodas throughout the kingdom. The last pagoda he commissioned on record was Uritdaw Pagoda on the Thila-Pabbata Hill near the Kaladan river. He led the relic chamber closing ceremony on 29 March 1592 (Sunday, 2nd waning of Late Tagu 953 ME).

The most famous temple donated by him is the Phara Ouk Pagoda in Mrauk-U. He also built the Pitaka-Taik to house the Buddhist Scriptures received from Ceylon.

== Hobbies ==
The king enjoyed elephant hunting. He was the owner of three white elephants, considered extremely auspicious by Burmese kings. He first became Hsinbyushin (Owner of White Elephant) on 10 September 1579 (Thursday, 5th waning of Tawthalin 941 ME). He got a female white elephant soon after. He got a third one c. 1582, after the Toungoo invasion. He is said to have gone on elephant hunting trips until 1592/1593, a few months before his death.

== Death ==
Phalaung died on 4 July [O.S. 24 June] 1593 (Sunday, 6th waxing of Waso 955 ME) at age 58 of natural causes. He was succeeded by his eldest son, Thado Dhamma Raza.

== Bibliography ==
- Gutman, Pamela (2001). Burma's Lost Kingdoms: Splendours of Arakan. Bangkok: Orchid Press. ISBN 974-8304-98-1.
- Harvey, G. E. (1925). History of Burma: From the Earliest Times to 10 March 1824. London: Frank Cass & Co. Ltd.
- Phayre, Lt. Gen. Sir Arthur P. (1883). History of Burma (1967 ed.). London: Susil Gupta.
- Sandamala Linkara, Ashin (1931). Rakhine Yazawinthit Kyan (in Burmese). Vol. 1–2 (1997–1999 ed.). Yangon: Tetlan Sarpay.

Min Phalaung Mrauk-U Kingdom Born: 27 February 1535 Died: 4 July 1593
Regnal titles
Preceded by Sekkya	King of Mrauk-U; 7 February 1572 – 4 July [O.S. 24 June] 1593	Succeeded by Raza II
