= West Island (Andaman Islands) =

- Location within Andaman and Nicobar Islands

Geography
- Location: Bay of Bengal
- Coordinates: 13.59°N 92.89°E
- Archipelago: Andaman Islands
- Adjacent to: Indian Ocean
- Total islands: 1
- Major islands: West
- Area: 2.85 km^{2} (1.10 sq mi)
- Length: 3.4 km (2.11 mi)
- Width: 1.1 km (0.68 mi)
- Coastline: 8.3 km (5.16 mi)
- Highest elevation: 53 m (174 ft)

Administration
- India
- District: North and Middle Andaman
- Island group: Andaman Islands
- Taluk: Diglipur Taluk

Demographics
- Population: 0 (2016)
- Pop. density: 0/km^{2} (0/sq mi)
- Ethnic groups: Hindu, Andamanese

Additional information
- Time zone: IST (UTC+5:30)
- PIN: 744202
- Telephone code: 031927
- ISO code: IN-AN-00
- Official website: www.and.nic.in
- Avg. summer temperature: 30.2 °C (86.4 °F)
- Avg. winter temperature: 23.0 °C (73.4 °F)
- Sex ratio: 15.0♂/♀
- Census Code: 35.639.0004

West Island is an island of the Andaman Islands. It belongs to the North and Middle Andaman administrative district, part of the Indian union territory of Andaman and Nicobar Islands. The island lies 212 km (132 mi) north from Port Blair.

== Geography ==
The island falls in between Coco Islands and North Andaman Island. It lies in the western approach to the Cleugh Passage. The island is small, having an area of 2.85 km^{2} (1.10 sq mi).

== Administration ==
Politically, West Island is part of Diglipur Tehsil.
