= East Island (Andaman Islands) =

Island of the Andaman Islands

- Location within Andaman and Nicobar Islands

Geography
- Location: Bay of Bengal
- Coordinates: 13.64°N 93.05°E
- Archipelago: Andaman Islands
- Adjacent to: Indian Ocean
- Total islands: 1
- Major islands: East
- Area: 3.10 km^{2} (1.20 sq mi)
- Length: 3.9 km (2.42 mi)
- Width: 1.2 km (0.75 mi)
- Coastline: 10.60 km (6.587 mi)
- Highest elevation: 89 m (292 ft)

Administration
- India
- District: North and Middle Andaman
- Island group: Andaman Islands
- Taluk: Diglipur Taluk
- Largest settlement: East village (pop. 16)

Demographics
- Population: 16 (2016)
- Pop. density: 5.16/km^{2} (13.36/sq mi)
- Ethnic groups: Hindu, Andamanese

Additional information
- Time zone: IST (UTC+5:30)
- PIN: 744202
- Telephone code: 031927
- ISO code: IN-AN-00
- Official website: www.and.nic.in
- Literacy: 100.0%
- Avg. summer temperature: 30.2 °C (86.4 °F)
- Avg. winter temperature: 23.0 °C (73.4 °F)
- Sex ratio: 15.0♂/♀
- Census Code: 35.639.0004
- Official Languages: Hindi, English

East Island is an island of the Andaman Islands. It belongs to the North and Middle Andaman administrative district, part of the Indian union territory of Andaman and Nicobar Islands. The island is located 220 km (137 mi) north from Port Blair.

Just to the west across a navigable narrow coral reef channel is Landfall Island which is the northernmost island belonging to India, and to the north are the Coco Islands belonging to Myanmar.

== History ==
The island was severely affected by the tsunami that was caused by the 2004 Indian Ocean earthquake, which led to damaged infrastructure. East Island Lighthouse was established in 1969 and is shown from a white, round metal tower with red bands standing on the South summit of the island; a recon is situated at the light. This lighthouse marks the northern end of the Andaman Islands.

== Geography ==
The island falls in between Coco Islands and North Andaman Island. It lies 0.8 nmi (1.5 km; 0.92 mi) east of Landfall Island, and is separated from North Andaman Island by the Cleugh Passage. The island is small, having an area of 3.1 km^{2} (1.2 sq mi).

== Administration ==
Politically, East Island is part of Diglipur Taluk. The village is near the Police station.

== Transportation ==
Ship service is available from Diglipur. Ship travel is only by special demand.

== Demographics ==
There is only 1 village. According to the 2011 census of India, the Island has xxx households. The effective literacy rate (i.e. the literacy rate of population excluding children aged 6 and below) is 100%.

Demographics (2011 Census)
	Total	Male	Female
Population	16	15	1
Children aged below 6 years	0	0	0
Scheduled caste	0	0	0
Scheduled tribe	16	15	1
Literates	16	15	1
Workers (all)	16	15	1
Main workers (total)	16	15	1
