= Saw Thanda =

Saw Thanda စောသန္တာ

Queen of the Southern Palace
- Tenure: 7 February 1572 – 4 July 1593
- Predecessor: herself (as chief queen)
- Successor: Wizala Dewi (as chief queen)

Chief queen consort of Arakan
- Tenure: c. 1566/67 – 7 February 1572
- Predecessor: Dhamma Dewi I
- Successor: Saw Mi Taw

Queen of the Northern Palace of Arakan
- Tenure: 6 March 1556 – c. 1566/67
- Predecessor: Saw Mi Lat
- Successor: Saw U

Chief queen consort of Arakan
- Tenure: 11 January 1554 – 6 March 1556
- Predecessor: Saw Min Hla
- Successor: Saw Hpone Htut
- Born: Ngwe Nu-Phru ငွေနုဖြူ c. 1530s Mrauk-U
- Died: 1590s? Mrauk-U
- Spouse: Dikkha (c. 1550s–56); Saw Hla (1556–64); Sekkya (1564–72); Phalaung (1572–93)
Names
- Poe War Minthamee Saw Thanda Dèwi Ngwe Nu Phru ပိုးဝါမင်းသမီး စောသန္တာဒေဝီ ငွေနုဖြူ
- House: Saw Mon
- Father: Min Bin
- Mother: Saw Min Hla
- Religion: Theravada Buddhism

Saw Thanda Dewi (Burmese: စောသန္တာဒေဝီ [sɔ́ θàɴdà dèwì]) was queen consort to four consecutive of kings of Arakan. She was the chief queen of King Dikkha (r. 1554–56). She later became queen to King Saw Hla (r. 1556–64) and King Sekkya (1564–72), both of whom were her step-sons, and later to King Phalaung (r. 1572–93). She led to troops in Mrauk-U against the Burmese invaders during Toungoo-Mrauk-U War.

== Bibliography ==
- Sandamala Linkara, Ashin (1931). Rakhine Yazawinthit Kyan (in Burmese). Vol. 1–2 (1997–1999 ed.). Yangon: Tetlan Sarpay.

Saw Thanda Mrauk-U Kingdom
Royal titles
| Preceded by herself as chief queen | Queen of the Southern Palace; 7 February 1572 – 4 July 1593 | Succeeded by Wizala Dewi as chief queen |
| Preceded by Dhamma Dewi I | Chief queen consort of Arakan c. 1566/67 – 7 February 1572 | Succeeded by Saw Mi Taw |
| Preceded by Saw Mi Lat | Queen of the Northern Palace of Arakan; 6 March 1556 – c. 1566/67 | Succeeded by Saw U |
| Preceded by Saw Min Hla | Chief queen consort of Arakan; 11 January 1554 – 6 March 1556 | Succeeded by Saw Hpone Htut |
