= Preparis =

One of the Andaman Islands in Yangon Region, Myanmar

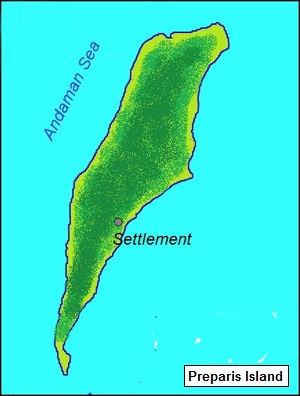
- Map of Preparis Island

- Location of Preparis Island in Myanmar and in the Bay of Bengal Preparis (Bay of Bengal)

Geography
- Location: Bay of Bengal
- Coordinates: 14.875°N 93.63°E
- Archipelago: Andaman Islands
- Adjacent to: Andaman Sea
- Total islands: 3
- Major islands: Preparis; Cow Islet; Calf Islet
- Area: 8.1 km^{2} (3.1 sq mi)
- Length: 7.7 km (4.78 mi)
- Width: 1.8 km (1.12 mi)
- Highest elevation: 81 m (266 ft)

Administration
- Myanmar
- Region: Yangon
- District: South Yangon
- Township: Cocokyun
- Ward: Preparis Ward
- Largest settlement: Preparis (pop. 50)

Demographics
- Population: 50 (2014)
- Pop. density: 6.2/km^{2} (16.1/sq mi)
- Ethnic groups: Bamar people

Additional information
- Time zone: MMT (UTC+6:30)
- ISO code: MM-06
- Official website: www.myanmarburma.com/attraction/498/preparis-island

Preparis Island is an island which is part of the Yangon Region of Myanmar. Together, with the other Andaman Islands (the majority of which are a union territory of India), it marks the boundary between the Bay of Bengal and the Andaman Sea. The island has a population of 50 and a total area of 8.1 km^{2} (3.1 sq mi).

The island is 133 km (83 mi) to the SSW of Cape Negrais, the nearest point on the Myanmar mainland and 340 km (210 mi) south of the capital, Yangon. The five Coco Islands (also part of Myanmar) are 77 km (48 mi) to the south.

== History ==
According to 19th century visitors, the island was uninhabited by humans, but many monkeys were observed. The island was host to the 78th Highlanders regiment of the British Army when on 5 November 1816 the regiment's transport ship Frances Charlotte hit an off-shore rock. Most passengers and crew survived on the island as a freshwater supply was discovered and their stay was brief. The merchant ship Prince Blucher arrived on 10 November and between 11 and 14 November was able to rescue some 316 men, women, and children. The weather and damage to Prince Blucher prevented her from rescuing another hundred. The Government of Bengal then sent two cruisers that then rescued the remainder.

== Geography ==
Preparis island makes up the northern end of the Andaman Islands chain. The island is 7.7 km (5 mi) long and has a maximum width of 1.8 km (1.1 mi). It is covered with dense forest and has gentle slopes rising to a maximum height of 81 metres (266 feet).

Cow and Calf Islets

A group of 3 Flat-topped islets, 23 metres (75 feet), 3.4 km (2.1 mi) to the north.

West Reef Islets

A group of 3 islets, 1 metre (3 feet), 4.2 km (2.6 mi) to the west.

Preparis Pinnacle

A rock, 12 metres (39 feet) high, 3 km (1.9 mi) to the south.

== Flora and fauna ==
The island is covered with low trees and bush. It has extensive flora coverage and area remains largely uncleared.

== Administration ==
The island is subject to the Cocokyun township of Myanmar, along with the Coco Islands.

== Demographics ==
The island has about 50 inhabitants who engage in very small scale farming and fishing, mainly for the local consumption; part of a military unit that inhabits remote border outposts.

== Transportation ==
Several beaches can cater for small supply craft. A small helipad serves the settlement.

== See also ==
Extreme points

- Rondo Island, Indonesia's northernmost island is closest to Indira Point
- Narcondam Island, India's easternmost point of Andaman Nicobar Islands group
- Landfall Island, India's northernmost island of Andaman Nicobar Islands group
- Extreme points of India
- Extreme points of Indonesia
- Extreme points of Myanmar
- Extreme points of Bangladesh
- Extreme points of Thailand
- List of islands of Burma

Borders of Myanmar

- Bangladesh–Myanmar border
- China–Myanmar border
- India–Myanmar border
- Laos–Myanmar border
- Thailand–Myanmar border
