= Cleugh Passage =

Strait of the Bay of Bengal in the Andaman Islands

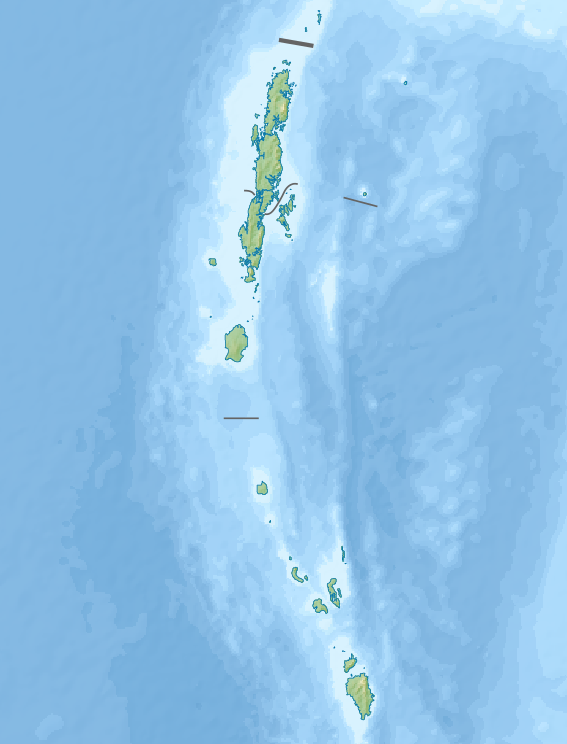
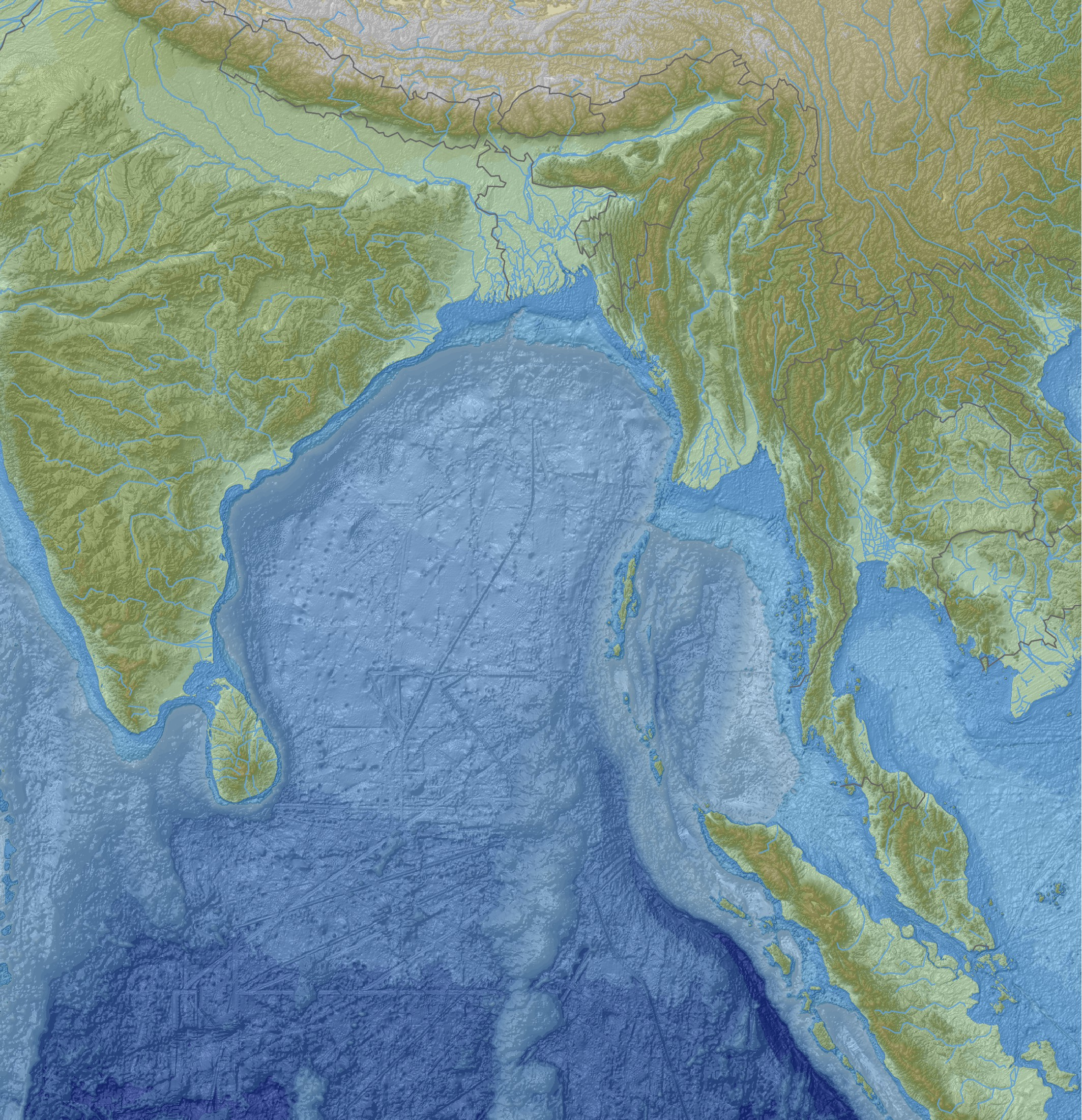
- Location in the Andaman and Nicobar Islands and in the Bay of Bengal Cleugh Passage (Bay of Bengal)
- Coordinates: 13.61°N 93.00°E
- Ocean/sea sources: Bay of Bengal
- Basin countries: India
- Max. width: 5 km (3.1 mi)
- Islands: Landfall Island, East Island

Cleugh Passage is a strait of the Bay of Bengal in the Andaman Islands, part of the Indian union territory of Andaman and Nicobar Islands. It lies at the north tip of North Andaman Island (Cape Price), and separates it from the smaller islands Landfall Island and East Island. It is about 5 km wide. West Island lies in the western approach to the passage.
