= Frances Charlotte (1816 ship) =

British ship built in Rangoon 1815–1816

History

United Kingdom
- Name: Four Sisters
- Builder: Rangoon
- Launched: 1815
- Renamed: Frances Charlotte
- Fate: Lost 1816

General characteristics
- Type: Ship
- Tons burthen: 670, or 672 (bm)
- Propulsion: Sail

Frances Charlotte was launched at Rangoon in 1815 as Four Sisters. She was renamed as Frances Charlotte and was lost in 1816 on Preparis in the Bay of Bengal.

== Loss ==
In 1816, the British Army left Java. Some 400 men of the 78th Highlanders regiment, together with their wives and children, embarked on Princess Charlotte on 18 September 1816 but a day later she hit a sunken rock. It was only with great difficulty that she returned to Batavia Roads. Her passengers transferred to Frances Charlotte, Captain Acres, which sailed for Calcutta on 29 September.

On 5 November 1816, Frances Charlotte hit a sunken reef some 12 miles off Preparis. The ship's boats could only take about 150 people at a time, and a number of men remained marooned on the wreck and a nearby rock.

On 9 November the merchant ship Po, Captain Knox, on her way to Penang from Madras, came by. She rescued 27 men (or 40) from the wreck, but then left after having lost a boat in a second attempt to bring off survivors, and with the weather worsening. Two men died in that attempt, and Po left behind her first mate.

On 10 November, the merchant ship Prince Blucher, Captain Weathrall, was sailing in the vicinity when she spied wreckage. Weathrall investigated and stopped to render assistance when he spotted a signal fire. Between 11 and 14 November, Prince Blucher was able to rescue some 316 men, women, and children. She was able to rescue 110 of the 119 men that had remained on the rock after Po left, the remainder having died.

The weather and damage to Prince Blucher prevented her from rescuing another 90 Europeans and 40 lascars who remained on the island. After nine days Prince Blucher arrived at Bengal.

The Government of Bengal then sent two cruisers that rescued the remaining survivors of the wreck. The last survivors had been marooned for some 36 days. By the time they were rescued, the survivors had run out of food and were too weak even to gather the few shellfish on the rocks at low tide. Some of the survivors died from privation shortly after finally being rescued, and some died from gorging themselves after having starved.

By one report, 14 soldiers and two lascars had died in the loss of Frances Charlotte.

At Calcutta, Weathrall and his men received great praise for their efforts. The Governor-General, on behalf of the government of Bengal, awarded Weathrall 5000 sicca rupees for plate. It also awarded money to his officers and crew. The merchants of Calcutta awarded Weathrall with an engraved silver plate.
