= Cape Negrais =

Cape in Myanmar

Location of Cape Negrais in Burma

Cape Negrais (Burmese: နဂရစ်အငူ, also known as Pagoda Point (ဆံတော်ရှင်မြတ်ငူ) or Mawtin Point (မော်တင်စွန်း, Mawtin Soon) is a cape in Burma (Myanmar), west of the Irrawaddy Delta. It is located 133 km to the NNE of Preparis Island and 193 kilometres from the nearest point in the Indian union territory of the Andaman and Nicobar Islands. For a long time, it was occupied by the Kingdom of Mrauk U (1429–1785 CE). It was a battleground in the Taungoo–Mrauk-U War of 1545 to 1547. Most of English traders were massacred in October 1759.

It is northernmost point of Andaman Sea where it meets the Bay of Bengal. To the south and east of this point lies Andaman Sea, and to the north and west lies the Bay of Bengal.

== Etymology ==
The Portuguese name 'Negrais' is borrowed from the Burmese name 'Nagariz' (နဂရစ်), which in turn came from 'Nagaraj' (Sanskrit: नागराज, lit. 'The dragon king'). It refers to the story of the dragon king 'Jeyasena'(ဇေယျသေန) taking some holy hairs of Buddha and creating a cape Pagoda.

== See also ==
- Geography of Burma
- Coco Islands, Myanmar's westernmost island.
- Landfall Island, India's's northernmost island in Andaman Nicobar islands.
