= Cocokyun Township =

Cocokyun Township ကိုကိုးကျွန်း မြို့နယ်
- Township
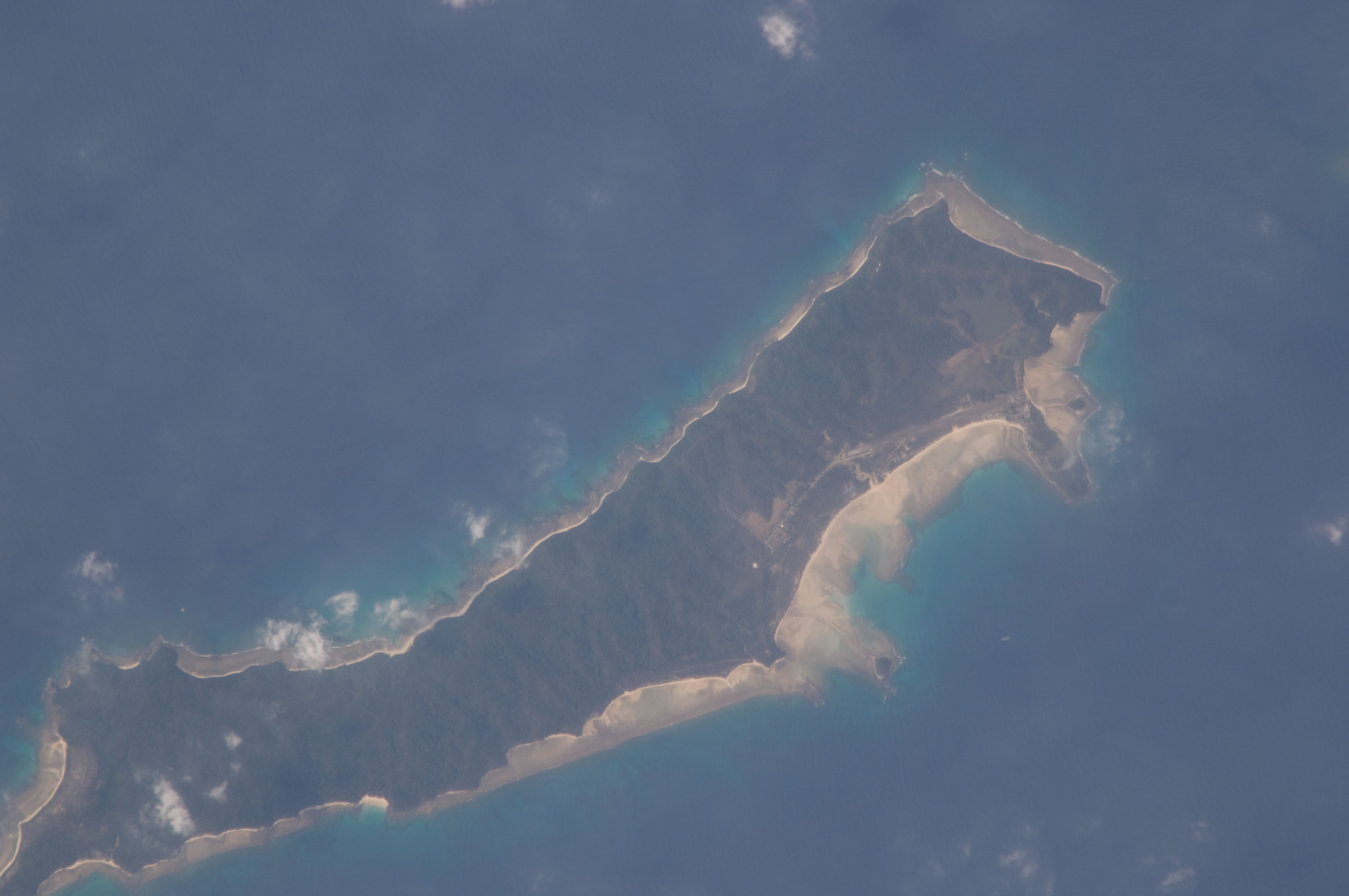
- Image of Great Coco Island from space

- Cocokyun township in Thanlyin District

- Location within Myanmar
- Coordinates: 14°22′30″N 93°28′30″E
- Country: Myanmar
- Region: Yangon Region
- District: Thanlyin District

Area
  - Total: 14.56 sq mi (37.7 km^{2})
- Elevation: 366 ft (112 m)

Population (2019)
  - Total: 1,109
  - Density: 76.17/sq mi (29.41/km^{2})
- Time zone: UTC6:30 (MMT)
- Postal codes: 112xx
- Area codes: 1 (mobile: 80, 99)

Cocokyun Township (or Cocogyun) (Burmese: ကိုကိုးကျွန်း မြို့နယ်, Kokògyùn Myónae) is located on the islands of Coco and Preparis, in Myanmar. The township, made up of two wards, is rural and underdeveloped because of its distance from the mainland. Preparis Ward is the smaller ward, having a population of only 50 residents. Cocos Ward is the larger ward, having all the local government infrastructure, and around 1,900 villagers.

The township was formerly part of the Hanthawaddy District in 1965 when it was assigned as a municipal territory of the defence forces. In 1999, the township and its two wards were created by the Myanmar Navy and Ministry of Home Affairs.

== Demographics ==
Historical Population
Year	Cocokyun Township	±%
2014	1,940	—
2018	1,115	−42.5%
2019	1,109	−0.5%
Source: 2014 Census and General Administration Department data

Cocokyun has two schools. There are 81 females for every 100 males in the township. In 2018, 149 people left the township and 143 people moved to the township. 100% of the island's population is Buddhist.
