= Coco Island Airport =

- IATA: none; ICAO: VYCI

Summary
- Owner/Operator: Myanmar Air Force
- Location: Coco Islands
- Time zone: Myanmar Standard Time (+6:30)
- Elevation AMSL: 20 ft / 6 m
- Coordinates: 14.1413°N 93.3683°E
- Interactive map of Coco Island Airport

Runways
Direction	Length		Surface
Direction	ft	m	Surface
01/19	4,443	1,354	Bitumen

Coco Island Airport is an airport located on Great Coco Island in Myanmar. The airport is no longer operational for civilian aircraft and has been converted into a military airbase. After the 2021 Myanmar coup d'état in Myanmar, there is rapid development of military infrastructure in the island such as expansion of airstrip, two new hangars, a radar station.
