= Min Saw Hla =

Min Saw Hla မင်းစောလှ

King of Arakan
- Reign: 6 March 1556 – 24 July 1564
- Predecessor: Dikkha
- Successor: Sekkya
- Born: 1532/33; Tuesday, 894 ME (Note: Based on the chronicle reporting of his age at his accession and his death (Sandamala Linkara Vol. 2 1999: 46–47), he was born between full moon of Wagaung 894 ME (17 July 1532) and 10th waning of Tabaung 894 ME (18 February 1533). Since he was born on a Tuesday, the range can be reduced to between 23 July 1532 and 17 February 1533.); Mrauk-U
- Died: 24 July 1564 (aged 31); Monday, Full moon of Wagaung 926 ME; Mrauk-U
- Consort: Saw Bon-Htut; Saw Thanda
- House: Min Bin
- Father: Dikkha
- Mother: Saw Mi Latt
- Religion: Theravada Buddhism

Min Saw Hla (Burmese: မင်းစောလှ, [mɪ́ɴ sɔ́ l̥a̰]; 1532–1564) was king of Arakan a former state in Myanmar (Burma), from 1556 to 1564. At accession, he made his first wife Saw Bon-Htut the chief queen but also married his father's chief queen Saw Thanda. He ordered a massive building program which built and repaired dams and irrigation canals as well as improved the defenses of Mrauk-U and other key towns around the kingdom. In 1561, he commissioned the building of Htukkanthein Temple. (Note: (Gutman 2001: 118) says the temple "is said to have been built in 1571 by King Min Phalaung". But the Rakhine Razawin Thit chronicle (Sandamala Linkara Vol. 2 1999: 46) says Htukkanthein was built by King Min Saw Hla in 923 ME (1561/62).)

He tightened control of Chittagong and the kingdom's northern perimeter. In the early 1560s, he sent the army to Tripura, whose ruler, according to Arakanese chronicles, submitted to Mrauk-U. He died in 1564 after a long illness. He had chosen his half-brother Min Sekkya to succeed him, and married Sekkya to his own full sister Dhamma Dewi.

== Bibliography ==
- Gutman, Pamela (2001). Burma's Lost Kingdoms: Splendours of Arakan. Bangkok: Orchid Press. ISBN 974-8304-98-1.
- Sandamala Linkara, Ashin (1931). Rakhine Yazawinthit Kyan (in Burmese). Vol. 1–2 (1997–1999 ed.). Yangon: Tetlan Sarpay.

Min Saw Hla Mrauk-U Kingdom Born: 1532 Died: 24 July 1564
Regnal titles
Preceded by Dikkha	King of Mrauk-U; 6 March 1556 – 24 July 1564	Succeeded by Sekkya
