= Min Sekkya =

Min Sekkya မင်းစကြာ

King of Arakan
- Reign: 24 July 1564 – 7 February 1572
- Predecessor: Saw Hla
- Successor: Phalaung
- Born: c. May 1536; Friday, 898 ME; Mrauk-U
- Died: 7 February 1572 (aged 35); Thursday, 8th waning of Tabodwe 933 ME; Mrauk-U
- Consort: Dhamma Dewi; Saw Thanda
- House: Min Bin
- Father: Dikkha
- Mother: Saw Kauk Ma
- Religion: Theravada Buddhism

Min Sekkya (Burmese: မင်းစကြာ, [mɪ́ɴ sɛʔtɕà], Rakhine pronunciation: [máɴ sɔʔkɹà]; 1536–1572) was king of Arakan from 1564 to 1572. He succeeded his elder half-brother King Min Saw Hla, who had chosen him to be the heir apparent. The northern vassal of Tripura, which had submitted to Min Saw Hla, revolted and for a time, he lost control of Chittagong. He took back the city, but he was unsuccessful in regaining control of Tripura. He married his sister Dhamma Dewi but after she died, he married Saw Thanda, who had been the wife of both own brother Min Saw Hla and his own father Min Dikkha. He died of natural causes in 1572, and was succeeded by his paternal uncle Min Phalaung.

== Bibliography ==
- Sandamala Linkara, Ashin (1931). Rakhine Yazawinthit Kyan (in Burmese). Vol. 1–2 (1997–1999 ed.). Yangon: Tetlan Sarpay.

Min Sekkya Mrauk-U Kingdom Born: c. May 1536 Died: 7 February 1572
Regnal titles
Preceded by Saw Hla	King of Mrauk-U; 24 July 1564 – 7 February 1572	Succeeded by Phalaung
