= Manakosa Union =

Manakosa মনাকষা
- Union
- Location in Bangladesh
- Coordinates: 24°41′20″N 88°03′48″E
- Country: Bangladesh
- Division: Rajshahi Division
- District: Chapai Nawabganj District
- Upazila: Shibganj Upazila

Area
  - Total: 50.98 km^{2} (19.68 sq mi)

Population (2011)
  - Total: 53,864
  - Density: 1,057/km^{2} (2,737/sq mi)
- Time zone: UTC+6 (BST)
- Website: Manakosa Union

Manakosa Union is a union in the Shibganj Upazila of Chapai Nawabganj District in the Rajshahi Division of Bangladesh.
