= Min Dikkha =

King of Arakan from 1554 to 1556

Min Dikkha မင်းတိက္ခာ
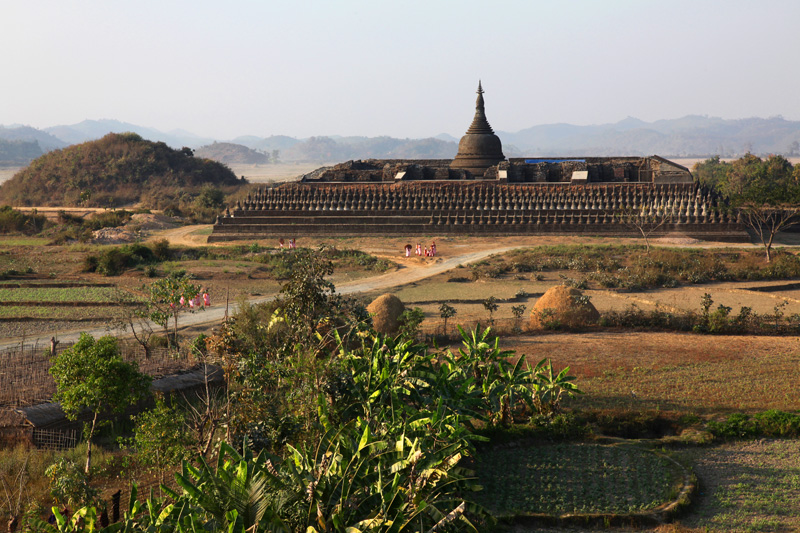
- Koe-thaung Temple built by King Dikkha

King of Arakan
- Reign: 11 January 1554 – 6 March 1556
- Predecessor: Min Bin
- Successor: Saw Hla
- Born: 1515; Sunday, 877 ME; Mrauk U
- Died: 6 March 1556 (aged 40); Friday, 10th waning of Tabaung 917 ME (Note: The Rakhine Razawin Thit chronicle (Sandamala Linkara Vol. 2 1999: 46) says he died on Friday, 10th waning of Tabaung 918 ME, which translates to Tuesday, 23 February 1557. The year 918 ME is an error; it should be 917 ME for the following reasons: (1) The chronicle on the next page (Sandamala Linkara Vol. 2 1999: 47) says his successor Min Saw Hla died on Monday, Full moon of Wagaung 926 ME (Monday, 24 July 1564) after having reigned for about 8 and a half years, meaning Min Saw Hla came to power in 1556, not 1557; (2) 10th waning of Tabaung 917 ME (6 March 1556) was a Friday as reported.); Mrauk U
- Consort: Saw Thanda; Saw Mi Latt
- Issue: 14 sons and 8 daughters including Min Saw Hla and Min Sekkya
Names
- Min Dikkha (မင်းတိက္ခာ); Bahadur Shah
- House: Min Bin
- Father: Min Bin
- Mother: Saw Kauk Ma
- Religion: Theravada Buddhism

Min Dikkha (Burmese: မင်းတိက္ခာ, Burmese pronunciation: [mɪ́ɴ deiʔ kʰà]; 1515–1556, in the Arakanese language as Mong Tikkha) was ruler of the Kingdom of Mrauk U, in what is now Rakhine State, Myanmar (Burma), from 1554 to 1556. He was the heir-apparent of the kingdom for 22 years during the reign of his father, King Min Bin. Dikkha was an able military commander who led the Arakanese navy in Min Bin's conquest of Bengal in 1532–1533. He led the Royal Arakanese Navy in the Taungoo–Ava War (1538–45), (Note: The Burmese chronicle Hmannan Yazawin (Hmannan Vol. 2 2003: 207) identifies the admiral as "upayaza". Typically, Upayaza means the crown prince, who would have been Dikkha. Note however that Min Bin had a son by concubine Saw Nandi named Upayaza per (Sandamala Linkara 1999: 34). Still, "Upayza" in the standard chronicles means crown prince, not as a proper name. In fact, Hmannan (Hmannan Vol. 2 2003: 227) explicitly refers to the Mrauk-U crown prince as "Upayaza the son of the king (Min Bin)".) and in the Taungoo–Mrauk-U War (1545–47).

== Reign ==
The king was also known as Bahadur Shah by the neighbouring Bengal.

During his short reign, Islam Shah Suri of the brief but influential Sur Empire died, creating a power vacuum leading to the re-emergence of the Bengal Sultanate. Based on coinage issued by the new Bengal Sultan Muhammad Khan Sur, some historians believe that Bengal exerted its influence on Arakan, far beyond the usual contestation over Chittagong. The extent of this is contested since the coinage uses the term "Rakan" rather than "Mrauk U", which could either be an early use of the later word "Arakan" or an atypical coin issued for the Chittagong province and not the capital at Mrauk U.

Min Dikkha built the Koe-thaung Temple, the largest of all temples in Mrauk U during his short reign.

== Death ==
Min Dikkha died from a kidney disease.

== Bibliography ==
- Gutman, Pamela (2001). Burma's Lost Kingdoms: Splendours of Arakan. Bangkok: Orchid Press. ISBN 974-8304-98-1.
- Royal Historical Commission of Burma (1832). Hmannan Yazawin (in Burmese). Vol. 1–3 (2003 ed.). Yangon: Ministry of Information, Myanmar.
- Sandamala Linkara, Ashin (1931). Rakhine Yazawinthit Kyan (in Burmese). Vol. 1–2 (1997–1999 ed.). Yangon: Tetlan Sarpay.
- Aye Chan (2017). ရခိုင်သမိုင်းမိတ်ဆက် [Introduction to Rakhine History]. Yangon: Shwe Thazin Publishing House.
- Chowdhury, Mohammaed Ali (2004). Bengal-Arakan Relations. Kolkata: Firma KLM Private Limited. ISBN 81-7102-118-2.

Min Dikkha Kingdom of Mrauk U Born: 1515 Died: 6 March 1556
Regnal titles
Preceded by Min Bin	King of Mrauk-U; 11 January 1554 – 6 March 1556	Succeeded by Saw Hla
