= James Henry Johnston =

British Royal Navy commander

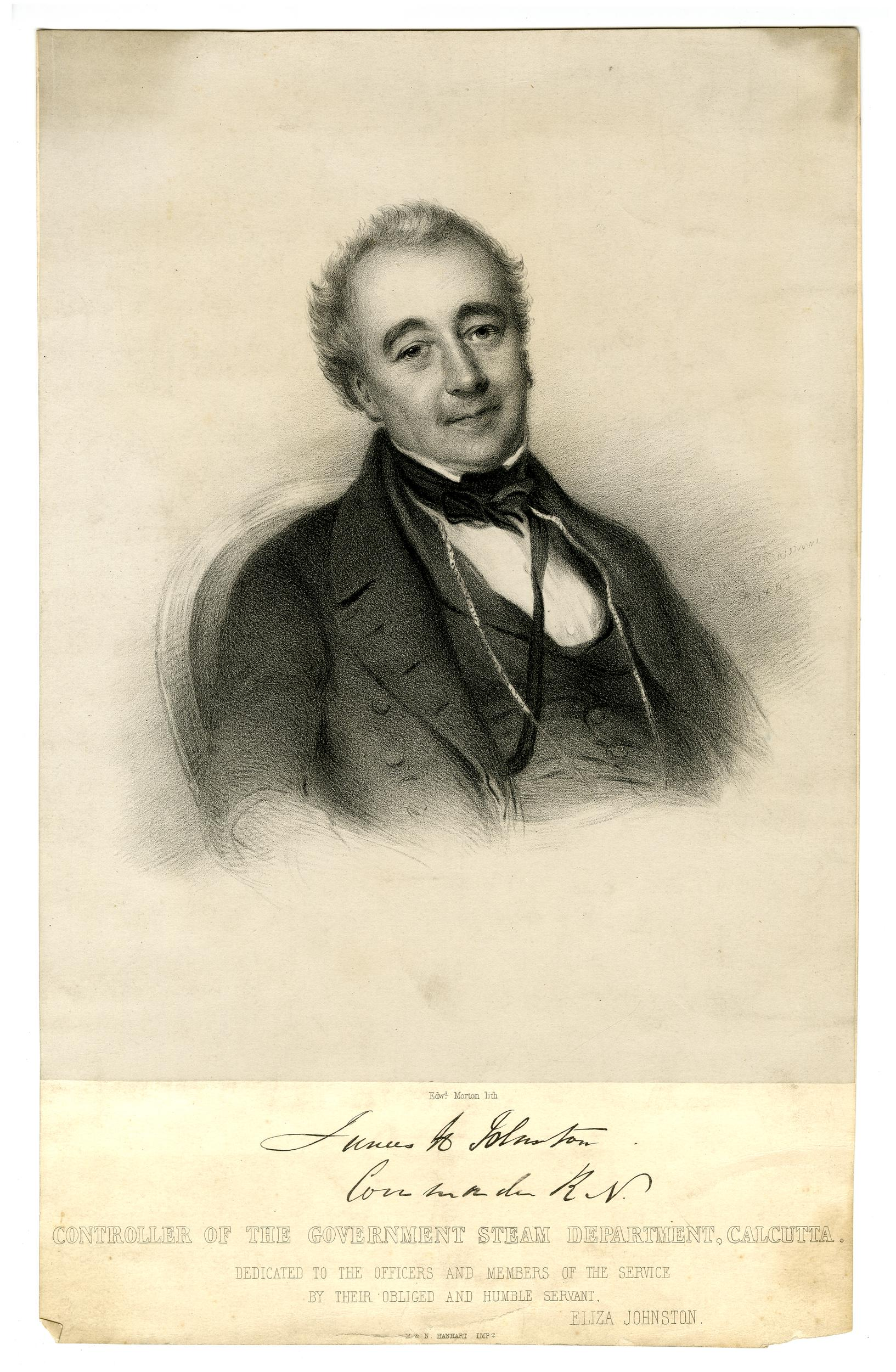
- Born: 1787
- Died: 5 May 1851 (aged 63–64)
- Occupation: Royal Navy commander

James Henry Johnston (c. 1787 – 5 May 1851) was a British Royal Navy commander and controller of the steamers of the East India Company.

== Biography ==
Johnston entered the navy in 1803 on board the in Spartiate, under the successive captains, George Murray, John Manley, and Sir Francis Laforey. In her he was present at the battle of Trafalgar, and in 1809 at the operations on the coast of Italy. In December 1809 he was promoted to be lieutenant of the Canopus, still on the coast of Italy, and being invalided from her in the following year, was in September 1811 appointed to the Kite sloop, employed in the North Sea, and afterwards in the Mediterranean. On her paying off, in December 1814, he was appointed to the Leveret on the home station, but in July 1815 was placed on half-pay. Seeing no probability of further employment, and having friends in Calcutta, he went thither in 1817, and obtained command of the ship Prince Blucher, in which he made two voyages to England. In 1821 he attempted to establish a sailors' home at Calcutta; it failed, but Johnston was brought under the favourable notice of the Marquis of Hastings, who appointed him marine storekeeper, and, before he could enter on the duties, commissioner of the court of requests; but Johnston returned to England to arrange his private affairs, and never filled either office. He then turned his attention to steam navigation, and drew up a proposal for establishing steam communication with India viâ the Mediterranean and Red Sea. In 1823 he returned to India to lay his plans before the governor-general. They were not accepted, and Johnston, returning to England, was appointed to the Enterprise, a private steam-vessel, in which he made the passage to India round the Cape of Good Hope, and arrived at Calcutta in December 1825. The steamer was immediately purchased for the company's service, and sent on to Burma, but not till after the conclusion of the war. In 1829 Johnston was desired to report on the practicability of establishing steam navigation on the Ganges, and after surveying the river was ordered to England to confer with the court of directors. His plans were approved, and for many years the navigation of the Ganges was carried on in iron steamers built after his design. Returning to India in 1833, he was appointed controller of the company's steamers, which post he held till 1850. On his passage home after retirement, he died on 5 May 1851. He was married, and left issue.
