= Landfall Island =

Island in India

Native name: Talrichiro, Taramikhu and Tanmoker
- Location within Andaman and Nicobar Islands Location within Bay of Bengal

Geography
- Location: Bay of Bengal
- Coordinates: 13.65°N 93.00°E
- Archipelago: Andaman Islands
- Adjacent to: Indian Ocean
- Total islands: 1
- Major islands: Landfall
- Area: 14.70 km^{2} (5.68 sq mi)
- Length: 4.7 km (2.92 mi)
- Width: 5.3 km (3.29 mi)
- Coastline: 20.00 km (12.427 mi)
- Highest elevation: 79 m (259 ft)
- Highest point: north hill

Administration
- India
- District: North and Middle Andaman
- Island group: Andaman Islands
- Taluk: Diglipur Taluk
- Largest settlement: Landfall village (pop. 6)

Demographics
- Population: 6 (2016)
- Pop. density: 0.4/km^{2} (1/sq mi)
- Ethnic groups: mainland Indians, Andamanese

Additional information
- Time zone: IST (UTC+5:30)
- PIN: 744202
- Telephone code: 031927
- ISO code: IN-AN-00
- Official website: www.and.nic.in
- Literacy: 100.0%
- Avg. summer temperature: 30.2 °C (86.4 °F)
- Avg. winter temperature: 23.0 °C (73.4 °F)
- Sex ratio: 15.0♂/♀
- Census Code: 35.639.0004
- Official Languages: Hindi, English

Landfall Island is the northernmost island of the Indian union territory of Andaman and Nicobar Islands. It belongs to the territory's North and Middle Andaman administrative district. The island lies 220 km (137 mi) north of Port Blair, and is situated 300 km (186 mi) south of Myanmar. It is home to the Kari tribe.

To the east 1.2 kilometres (0.65 nmi) across a navigable narrow coral reef channel is East Island also belonging to India, and 40 kilometres (22 nmi) to the north are the Coco Islands belonging to Myanmar.

== History ==
The island was severely affected by the tsunami that was caused by the 2004 Indian Ocean earthquake, which led to damaged infrastructure. The island's coral reefs were exposed in bulk.

== Geography ==
The island is situated between North Andaman Island and Myanmar's Coco Islands. It is separated from North Andaman Island by the Cleugh Passage. The island is small, having an area of 3.1 km^{2} (1.2 sq mi).

== Administration ==
Politically, Landfall Island, along with neighboring islands, is part of Diglipur Taluk. The village is near the police station.

== Transportation ==
Ferries connect this island to Diglipur.

== Demographics ==
There is only one small village on the landfall island, composed only of the native tribes. According to the 2011 census of India, the effective literacy rate (i.e. the literacy rate of population excluding children aged 6 and below) is 100%.

Demographics (2011 Census)
	Total	Male	Female
Population	6	0	0
Children aged below 6 years	0	0	0
Scheduled caste	0	0	0
Scheduled tribe	6	0	0
Literates	6	0	0
Workers (all)	6	0	0
Main workers (total)	6	0	0

== See also ==
Exclusive economic zones

- Exclusive economic zone of India
- Exclusive economic zone of Indonesia
- Exclusive economic zone of Malaysia
- Exclusive economic zone of Thailand
- India's Look-East Connectivity projects
- Sabang strategic port development, India-Indonesia project
- Sittwe Port, India-Myanmar project
- Dawei Port Project in Myanmar

Extreme points

- Indira Point, India's southernmost point of Andaman Nicobar Islands group
- Rondo Island, Indonesia's northernmost island is closest to Indira Point
- Narcondam Island, India's easternmost point of Andaman Nicobar Islands group
- Coco Islands, Myanmar's islands closest to Indian islands in northern Andaman sea
- Exclusive economic zone of India
- Extreme points of India
- Extreme points of Indonesia
- Extreme points of Myanmar
- Extreme points of Bangladesh
- Extreme points of Thailand
- Borders of India
