= Extreme points of Bangladesh =

Here is a list of the extreme points and extreme elevations in Bangladesh

== Extreme points ==
Heading	Location	Administrative entity	Bordering entity
Northernmost	Banglabandha	Tetulia Upazila, Panchagarh District	Siliguri, West Bengal, India
Southernmost	Chhera Dwip, St. Martin's Island	Teknaf Upazila, Cox's Bazar District	Bay Of Bengal
Southernmost(mainland)	Shah Parir Dwip Cape, Teknaf Peninsula	Teknaf Upazila, Cox's Bazar District	Bay Of Bengal, Naf River
Easternmost	Akhainthong	Thanchi Upazila, Bandarban District	Mindat District, Chin State, Myanmar
Westernmost	Manakosa Union	Shibganj Upazila, Chapai Nawabganj District	Kaliachak, Malda District, West Bengal, India

== Extreme altitudes ==
Extremity	Name	Elevation	Location	Division
Highest	Saka Haphong	1,052 m (3,451 ft)	Thanchi Upazila, Bandarban District	Chittagong Division
Lowest	Swatch of no ground	−900 m (−2,952.8 ft)	near Dublar Char, Shyamnagar Upazila, Satkhira District	near Khulna Division

== See also ==
- Extreme points of India, shares border with Bangladesh
- Extreme points of Myanmar, shares border with Bangladesh
- Bangladesh-India border
- Bangladesh-Myanmar border
