= Coco Islands =

Group of islands off the coast of Myanmar

Native name: ကိုကိုးကျွန်း (Burmese)
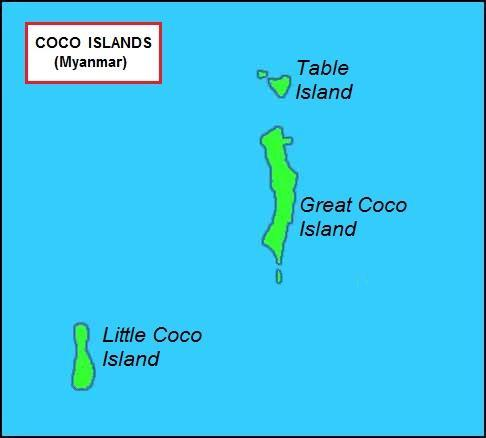
- Map of the Coco Islands group, Great Coco Island in north and Little Coco Island in southwest

- Location of Coco Islands in Myanmar and in the Bay of Bengal Coco Islands (Bay of Bengal)

Geography
- Location: Bay of Bengal
- Coordinates: 14.05°N 93.35°E
- Archipelago: Andaman Islands
- Adjacent to: Andaman Sea
- Total islands: 7
- Major islands: Great Coco; Little Coco
- Area: 7.93 sq mi (20.5 km^{2})
- Length: 6.2 mi (10 km)
- Highest elevation: 366 ft (111.6 m)

Administration
- Myanmar
- Region: Yangon
- District: Thanlyin District
- Township: Cocokyun
- Ward: Coco Islands
- Largest settlement: Great Coco Island (pop. 1,000+)

Demographics
- Population: Less than 1,109 (2019)
- Pop. density: 54/sq mi (20.8/km^{2})
- Ethnic groups: Bamar people, non-Burmese minorities

Additional information
- Time zone: MMT (UTC+6:30)
- ISO code: MM-06

The Coco Islands (Burmese: ကိုကိုးကျွန်း) are a small group of islands in the northeastern Bay of Bengal. They are part of the Yangon Region of Myanmar since 1937. The islands are located 414 km (257 mi) south of the city of Yangon. Coco Island group consists of five islands: four on the Great Coco Reef and one on the Little Coco Reef, one is RaiCoco. To the north of this island group lies Preparis Island, belonging to Myanmar. To the south lies the Landfall Island, belonging to India.

== History ==
The islands were on the ancient trade route between India, Burma, and Southeast Asia and were regularly visited by ships. In the 16th century, Portuguese sailors named the islands after the Portuguese word for coconut, coco. The East India Company took over the islands in the 18th century, later becoming part of the British Raj. The Coco Islands provided food, mainly coconuts, to a penal colony at Port Blair on South Andaman Island; the colony was established in 1858 to hold prisoners from the Indian Rebellion of 1857.

The islands were leased to the Jadwet family in the 1860s, who built a lighthouse on Table Island. The islands were deemed too remote to administer from India after it took many weeks for the Chief Commissioner at Port Blair to learn of a murder at the lighthouse in 1877. Control was transferred to British Burma by 1882. The islands were commercially leased starting in 1878, but attempts to develop it over the next 60 years failed.

Burma retained the islands when it became a crown colony in 1937. Japan occupied the islands from 1942 to 1945 during the Second World War.

=== Postcolonial history ===
Burma became independent in 1948 with control over the Coco Islands. A penal colony was founded on Great Coco Island in January 1959 by Ne Win's government for political prisoners. After Ne Win’s 1962 coup d'état, it developed a reputation as a Burmese "Devil’s Island". Three inmate hunger strikes from 1969 to 1971 led to the prison's closure in December 1971. Afterward, the facilities were transferred to the Burmese Navy.

In 1998, Indian Defence Minister George Fernandes claimed that China leased the islands in 1994; no supporting evidence had emerged by 2008.

== Geography ==
The Bay of Bengal lies to the west of the islands. The Andaman Sea lies to the east. The Burmese mainland is 250 kilometres (155 mi) to the north. The island of Preparis lies 77 km (48 mi) to the north-northeast of the Coco Islands. The Coco Islands consist of three main islands, namely Great Coco Island and the smaller Little Coco Island, separated by the Alexandra Channel, as well as Table Island, a third small island located near Great Coco Island.

Geographically, they are a part of the Andaman Islands archipelago, most of which belongs to India. They are separated from Landfall Island, the northernmost island in the Indian part of the archipelago, by the 20 kilometres (12 mi) wide Coco Channel.

=== Great Coco reef ===
This reef has four islands. From north to south those are Slipper Island, Table Island, Great Coco Island, and Jerry Island.

==== Great Coco Island ====
The Coco Islands consist of three main islands: Great Coco Island and the smaller Little Coco Island are separated by the Alexandra Channel. A third small island located near Great Coco Island is Table Island.

Great Coco Island (14°07′00″N 93°22′03″E) is 10.4 km (6.5 mi) long and 2 km (1.2 mi) wide. Many green turtles nest on the beaches of the Island. A series of research programs on marine turtle conservation has been conducted by Myanmar's Ministry of Livestock, Fisheries, and Rural Development. Data collection on tissue samples of green turtles for population genetic and tagging studies was conducted at Great Coco Island in March and April, 2006. Previously, Great Coco Island had never been surveyed for marine turtle conservation due to its remote location. The survey found an estimated 150 sea turtles nesting along with 95,000 hatchlings and juveniles.

==== Table Island ====
The axe-head-shaped Table Island is located 2.5 km (1.6 mi) to the north of Great Coco Island. The island is 1.6 km (1.0 mi) long and 1.2 km (0.7 mi) wide. The island previously housed a lighthouse in its southwestern portion, but it is now uninhabited. The lighthouse was built in 1867, with a focal plane of 59 m. It has a lantern and gallery, painted with red and white horizontal bands. Two 1-story brick keeper's houses and other light station buildings lie around the lighthouse.

The island is accessible by boat. One of the former island keepers was brutally murdered by his boss.

==== Slipper Island ====
Slipper Island is a 0.4 km (0.2 mi) long narrow islet located off the northwestern point of Table Island, separated from it by a 0.2 km (0.1 mi) narrow channel.

==== Jerry Island ====
Jerry Island is a 1.1 km (0.7 mi) long and 0.2 km (0.12 mi) wide islet located off the southern point of Great Coco Island, which can be reached from the Great Coco Island just by walking on the sandbar connecting these two islands.

=== Little Coco Reef ===
This reef has only one island.

==== Little Coco Island ====
Little Coco Island lies 16 km (9.9 mi) to the southwest of Great Coco Island. It is 5 km (3.1 mi) long from north to south and 1.2 km (0.75 mi) wide from east to west. This island is on a separate reef, and the rest of the four islands (including Table Island) are on the same reef as Coco Island. This is the southernmost Island belonging to Myanmar in the Andaman and Nicobar Sea, the next island to the south is Landfall Island belonging to India.

=== General information ===
| Island | Location | Features | Area (km^{2}) | Population |
|---|---|---|---|---|
| Great Coco Island | 14.10°N 93.365°E | Airport, coconut groves | 14.57 | 1000+ |
| Little Coco Island | 13.988°N 93.225°E | Coconut groves | 4.44 | 150 |
| Table Island | 14.185°N 93.365°E | Lighthouse | 1.28 | 0 |
| Slipper Island | 14.19°N 93.357°E | | 0.08 | 0 |
| Rat Island | 14.128°N 93.382°E | | 0.015 | 0 |
| Binnacle Rock | 14.15°N 93.372°E | | 0.011 | 0 |
| Jerry Island | 14.05°N 93.365°E | | 0.14 | 0 |
| Coco Islands (Total) | | | 20.53 | 1350+ |

== Image gallery ==
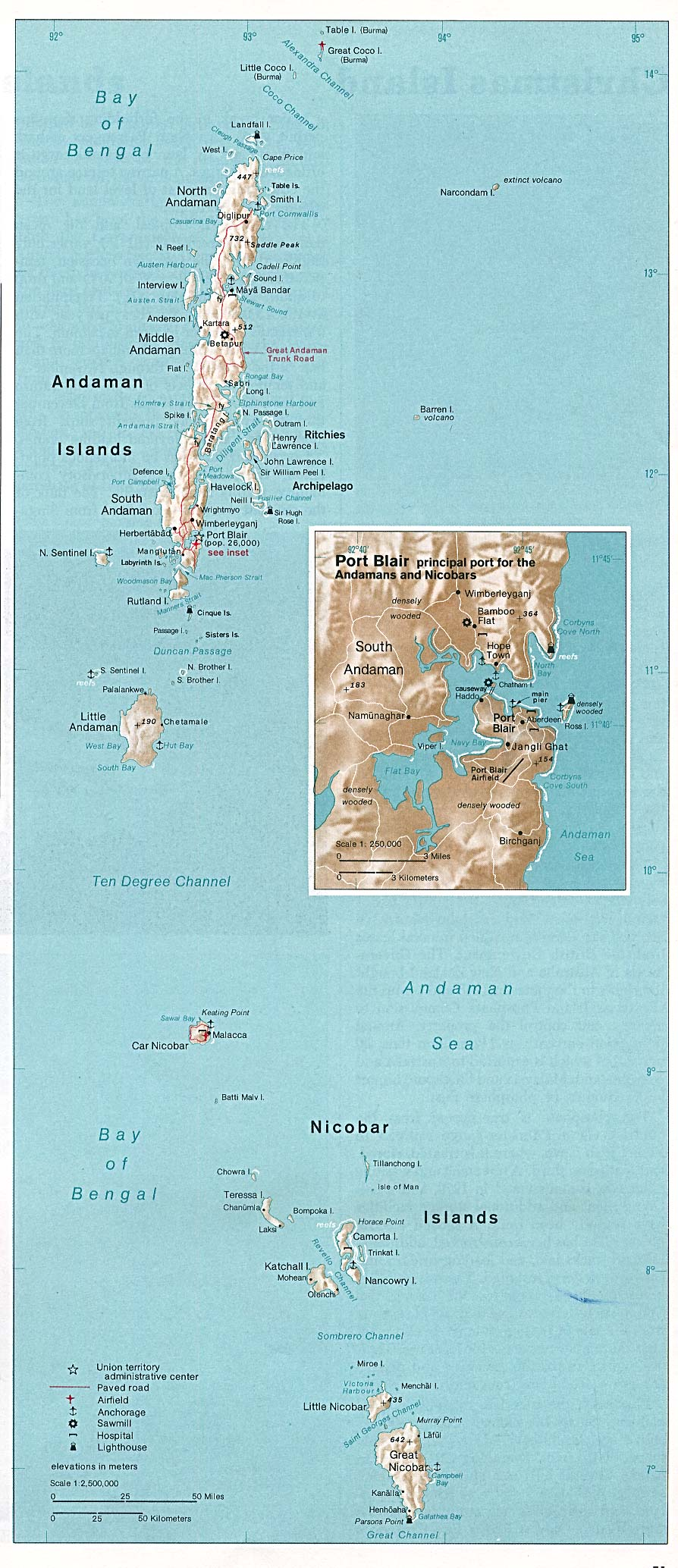
Map of the Andaman and Nicobar Islands, with the Coco Islands in the extreme north

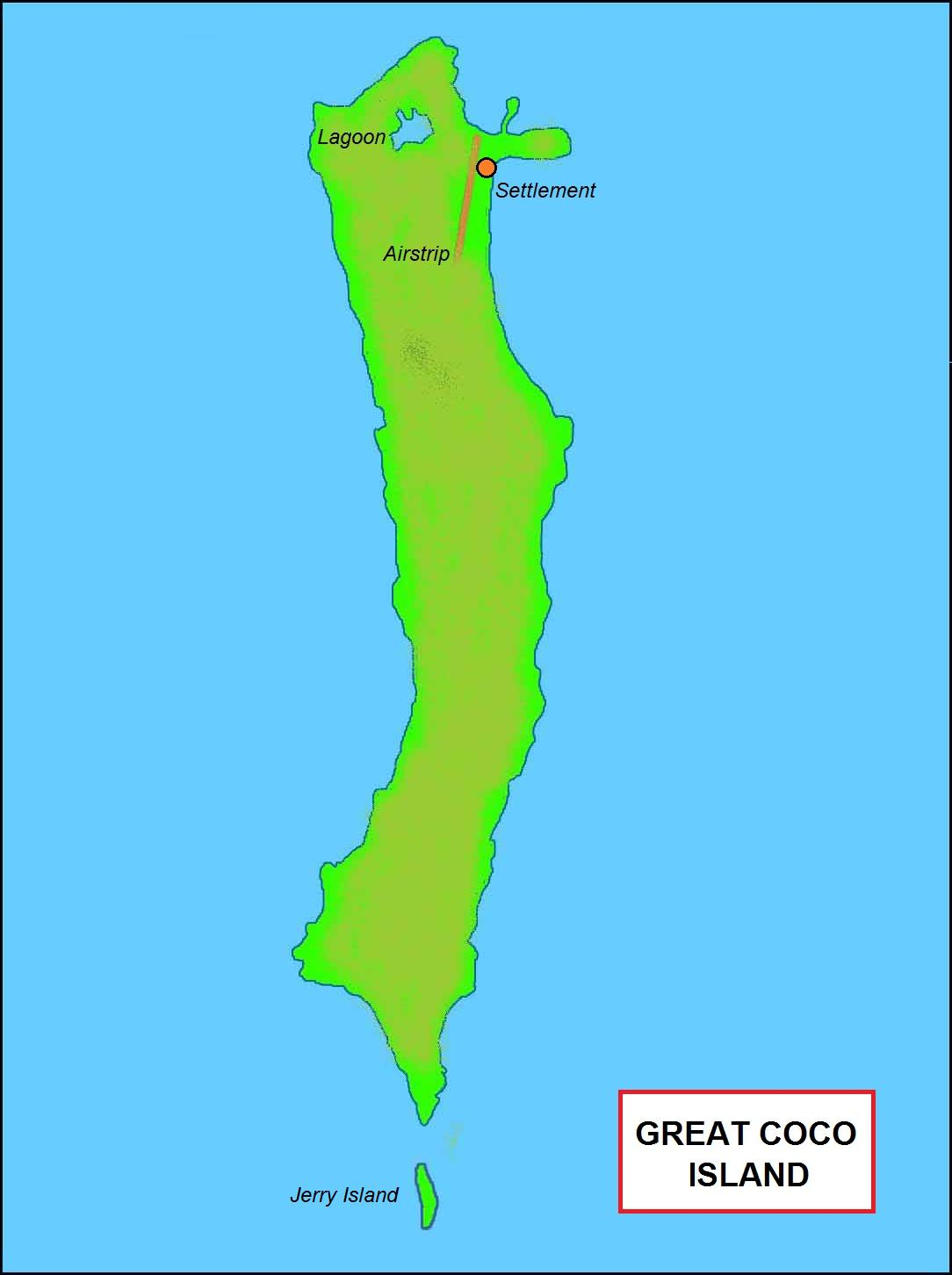
Map of Great Coco Island with tiny Jerry Island at the bottom

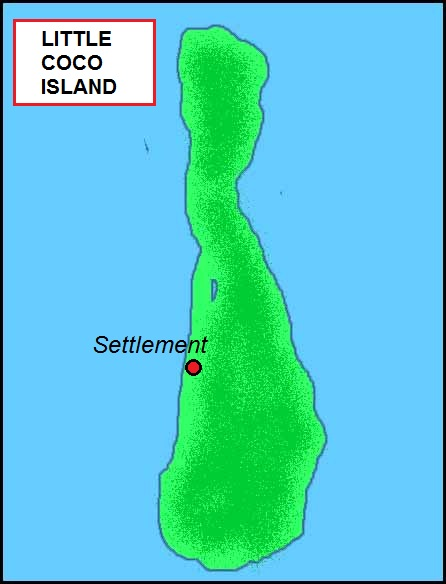
Map of Little Coco Island, it is the southernmost island of Myanmar

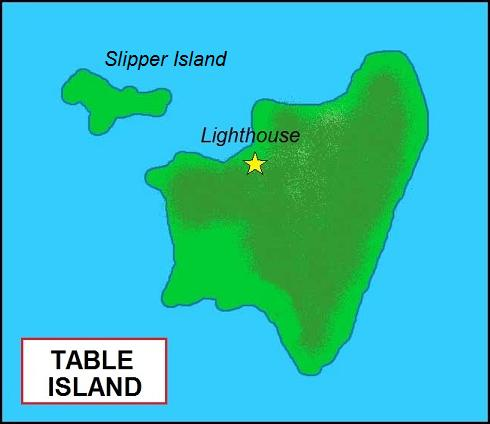
Map of Table Island in the middle and Slipper Island to the northwest

== Demography ==
There are more than 200 houses on Great Coco Island, and its total population is around a thousand people. A large water catchment reservoir can support the island's population.

There is a naval base on the islands, which belongs to the 28th unit of the Myanmar Navy. It is home to some 200 soldiers and their families.

== Climate ==
The Coco Islands have a tropical monsoon climate (Köppen climate classification Am). Temperatures are very warm throughout the year. There is a winter dry season from December to March. There is a summer wet season from April to November. Heavy rain has been known in September, such as 761 millimetres (30.0 in) of rain.

Climate data for Coco Islands (1991–2020)
| Month | Jan | Feb | Mar | Apr | May | Jun | Jul | Aug | Sep | Oct | Nov | Dec | Year |
|---|---|---|---|---|---|---|---|---|---|---|---|---|---|
| Mean daily maximum °C (°F) | 30.7 (87.3) | 31.1 (88.0) | 31.9 (89.4) | 33.4 (92.1) | 32.8 (91.0) | 31.1 (88.0) | 30.6 (87.1) | 30.3 (86.5) | 30.5 (86.9) | 31.5 (88.7) | 32.0 (89.6) | 31.2 (88.2) | 31.4 (88.5) |
| Daily mean °C (°F) | 25.7 (78.3) | 25.6 (78.1) | 26.6 (79.9) | 28.4 (83.1) | 28.8 (83.8) | 27.7 (81.9) | 27.2 (81.0) | 27.0 (80.6) | 26.9 (80.4) | 27.4 (81.3) | 27.5 (81.5) | 26.6 (79.9) | 27.1 (80.8) |
| Mean daily minimum °C (°F) | 20.8 (69.4) | 20.1 (68.2) | 21.3 (70.3) | 23.4 (74.1) | 24.7 (76.5) | 24.3 (75.7) | 23.7 (74.7) | 23.7 (74.7) | 23.4 (74.1) | 23.2 (73.8) | 23.0 (73.4) | 21.9 (71.4) | 23.9 (75.0) |
| Average precipitation mm (inches) | 21.6 (0.85) | 1.0 (0.04) | 13.4 (0.53) | 39.9 (1.57) | 238.8 (9.40) | 454.4 (17.89) | 466.1 (18.35) | 463.1 (18.23) | 426.4 (16.79) | 193.3 (7.61) | 135.1 (5.32) | 30.6 (1.20) | 2,483.7 (97.78) |
| Average precipitation days (≥ 1.0 mm) | 0.8 | 0.1 | 0.8 | 2.4 | 11.9 | 19.8 | 20.9 | 20.3 | 19.3 | 13.8 | 6.9 | 1.6 | 118.5 |
Source: World Meteorological Organization

== Administration ==
The island belongs to the township of Cocokyun. The township had a corruption scandal in the Myanmar general election of 2015. Ballots were filled in Yangon without being shipped, resulting in a high turnout and police investigation.

== Transportation ==
The 1,800-metre (5,900 ft) Coco Island Airport (ICAO code: VYCI) is at the north of Great Coco Island. It follows the north–south axis near the island's village. The airport was recently renovated.

== Military ==
In 1992, a Japanese news service reported that China was helping upgrade the base on Great Coco Island. Through the 1990s and 2000s, journalists and academics expanded the claims to China having a major signals intelligence base, seemingly part of the so-called "string of pearls", that monitored Indian activity. In 1998, George Fernandes also claimed China intended to build a major naval base on the islands; India was the only country to publicly "confirm" that the Chinese base existed. No supporting evidence appears through 2008. China and Burma denied the base's existence. In 1998, the United States reported that there was no significant Chinese activity. In 2005, India retracted its position; this followed an Indian inspection of the islands at Burma's invitation.

In 2014, Air Marshal P. K. Roy, commander-in-chief of India's Andaman and Nicobar Command, stated that "China has been developing a runway for civilian purposes. There are no reports of the presence of Chinese per se. The situation is not alarming". He added that there were only some civilian infrastructural developments, which were not a threat to India.

Satellite images from Maxar Technologies, taken in January 2023, revealed upgrades to Coco Island Airport. These included a longer 2,300-metre runway, a radar tower, and two new hangars. It appears that the installation is run by the Tatmadaw or Myanmar military with no visible Chinese military presence.

== Flora and fauna ==
The islands offer the opportunity to see rare reptiles, birds, and mammals that are unique to the Coco Islands.

== See also ==
Exclusive economic zones

- Exclusive economic zone of India
- Exclusive economic zone of Indonesia
- Exclusive economic zone of Malaysia
- Exclusive economic zone of Thailand
- India's Look-East Connectivity projects
- Sabang strategic port development, India-Indonesia project
- Sittwe Port, India-Myanmar project
- Dawei Port Project in Myanmar

Extreme points

- Rondo Island, Indonesia's northernmost island is closest to Indira Point
- Narcondam Island, India's easternmost point of Andaman Nicobar Islands group
- Landfall Island, India's northernmost island of Andaman Nicobar Islands group
- Extreme points of India
- Extreme points of Indonesia
- Extreme points of Myanmar
- Extreme points of Bangladesh
- Extreme points of Thailand
- List of islands of Burma

Borders of Myanmar

- Bangladesh–Myanmar border
- China–Myanmar border
- India–Myanmar border
- Laos–Myanmar border
- Thailand–Myanmar border

== Sources ==
- Selth, Andrew (November 2008). Burma's Coco Islands: Rumours and Realities in the Indian Ocean (PDF). Southeast Asia Research Centre (Report). Working Papers. City University of Hong Kong.
