= Toungoo–Mrauk-U War =

War between the Toungoo Dynasty of Burma and the Arakanese Kingdom of Mrauk U

Toungoo–Mrauk-U War (1545–1547)
- Part of the wars of the Toungoo Empire
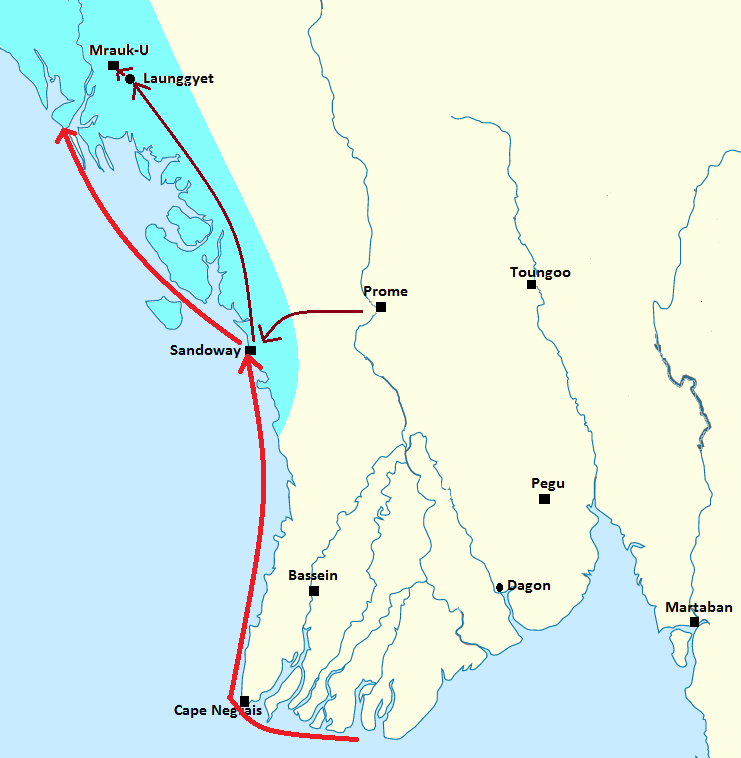
- Toungoo invasion routes in the 1546–47 campaign
Date	12 October 1545 – 30 January 1547
Location	Arakan
Result	Mrauk U victory; Treaty of Mrauk U (1547)
Territorial changes	Status quo ante bellum

Belligerents
Toungoo Dynasty	Kingdom of Mrauk U

Commanders and leaders
Tabinshwehti; Bayinnaung; Nanda Thingyan; Smim Bya Thamaik; Thiri Zeya Kyawhtin; Nanda Yawda; Sit Tuyingathu; Smim Enaye; Sithu Kyawhtin II of Salin; Diogo Soares	Min Bin; Min Dikkha; Maha Pyinna Kyaw; Min Phalaung

Units involved
Royal Burmese Army; Royal Burmese Navy; Portuguese mercenaries	Royal Arakanese Army; Royal Arakanese Navy; Portuguese mercenaries

Strength
1545: 4,000+ (Note: Per (Harvey 1925: 333–336), the troops levels in this article are reduced by an order of magnitude from those reported in the Burmese chronicles.): 4,000 (initial); unspecified (later) (Note: (Hmannan Vol. 2 2003: 227) Tabinshwehti sent more troops to relieve a regiment pinned down by Mrauk U troops.); 1546–47: 19,000: 15,000 (Navy) (Note: Chronicles (Maha Yazawin Vol. 2 2006: ) and (Hmannan Vol. 2 2003: 228) say 15 regiments were transported by sea. They give the total number of troops as 350,000, which per (Harvey 1925: 333–336) should be 35,000. But 35,000 is still likely a typographical error. Fifteen regiments typically equaled no more than 15,000 men. Per (Dijk 2006: 35–37), a 1605 royal order decreed that a regiment consist of 1000 men. It is likely that the size of the regiment was around 1000 in the 1540s as well.); 4,000 (Army)	1545: 6 regiments 1546–47: 20,000+: 20,000+ (Army); unknown (Navy)

Casualties and losses
Unknown	Unknown

The Toungoo–Mrauk-U War (Burmese: တောင်ငူ–မြောက်ဦး စစ်) was a military conflict that took place in Arakan (present-day Rakhine State of Myanmar) from 1545 to 1547 between the Toungoo Dynasty and the Kingdom of Mrauk U. The western kingdom successfully fended off the Toungoo invasions, and kept its independence. The war had a deterrence effect: Mrauk U would not see another Toungoo invasion until 1580.

The war's origins can be traced back to 1542 when King Min Bin of Mrauk U provided military support on the side of the Kingdom of Ava in the Toungoo–Ava War (1538–45). Although Min Bin left the alliance in the same year, King Tabinshwehti of Toungoo was determined to repay the favor. In 1545, Tabinshwehti agreed to aid Min Aung Hla, the former Viceroy of Thandwe, who had been removed from office by Min Bin. In October 1545, Tabinshwehti sent a 4000-strong army but it was promptly driven back. A much larger naval and land forces (combined 19,000 troops) of Toungoo tried again in the following dry season. The invasion forces overran southern Arakan, and were about to breach the defenses of the capital of Mrauk U when Mrauk U forces opened the sluices of the city's reservoirs, flooding the invaders out. On 30 January 1547, the two sides agreed to a peace treaty that allowed an orderly withdrawal of Toungoo forces from Arakan. The uneasy peace would last for the next 33 years.

== Background ==
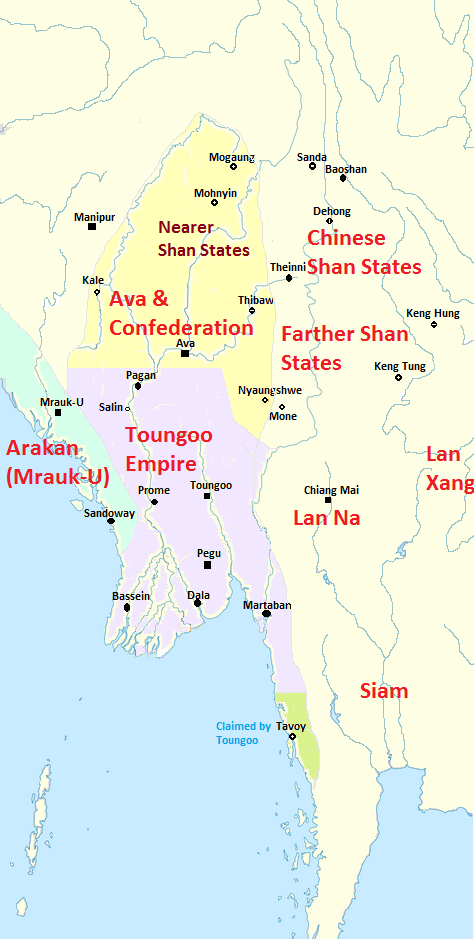
Toungoo-ruled territory in 1545

In the early 16th century, the present-day Myanmar comprised several small kingdoms. The two traditional powers that had dominated the Irrawaddy valley since the 14th century, the Kingdom of Ava (Inwa) and Hanthawaddy kingdom, were in serious decline. By the 1530s, the old powers had been or were being eclipsed by upstart powers. In Upper Burma, the Mohnyin-led Confederation of Shan States finally finished off Ava in 1527. On the western coast, the Kingdom of Mrauk U was ascendant at the expense of a weak Bengal, extending its reach into the Ganges Delta in 1533. In the south, In the south, Toungoo defeated Pegu in 1538–39, and Martaban in 1541, giving the men from the small frontier outpost total control of Lower Burma.

Toungoo's meteoric rise raised alarm amongst other powers. In 1539, Ava (now part of the Confederation) and Mrauk U entered into an alliance to defend Ava's vassal state of Prome. But their poorly coordinated forces could not stop better organized Toungoo forces from taking over Prome (Pyay) in 1542. After his army's crushing defeat at Padaung Pass, King Min Bin of Mrauk U left the alliance. Convinced that Toungoo's guns would eventually point toward his kingdom, Min Bin beefed up the already formidable defenses around his capital. In the following three years, Toungoo completed its takeover of central Burma up to Bagan, which Ava formally ceded in exchange for peace in 1545. King Tabinshwehti had now built the largest polity in Burma since the fall of the Pagan Empire in 1287. But as his upcoming campaigns in Arakan (1545–47) and Thailand (1547–49) show he was still intent on expanding elsewhere.

== Prelude ==
Burmese and Arakanese chronicles give differing accounts of the events leading to the war. The Burmese chronicles Maha Yazawin and Hmannan Yazawin give Mrauk U's prior involvement in the Ava–Toungoo war as the main reason for the war while Arakanese chronicles are completely silent on Mrauk U's role in the Ava–Toungoo war. Furthermore, the Burmese chronicles say that Tabinshwehti invaded at the invitation of the viceroy of Thandwe, who had lost the Arakanese throne to his nephew following the death of the Arakanese king in 1545. All major Arakanese chronicles agree that the Arakanese king had not died, and that the king appointed his son as viceroy of Thandwe, replacing his brother, at some point during his reign. But they disagree as to when the replacement took place, and whether the deposed viceroy remained loyal to Min Bin afterwards. Dhanyawaddy Ayedawbon says that the king replaced his brother with one of his sons as viceroy of Thandwe, and his brother subsequently sought help from Toungoo. Rakhine Razawin Haung and Maha Razawin (Saya Me) too say that the king appointed his son Prince Upayaza viceroy at an unidentified date but suggest that his brother Min Aung Hla remained loyal and was still the viceroy during the Toungoo invasions. But they never mention when and why Min Aung Hla lost his office afterwards.

In all, it appears that in 1545 Min Aung Hla lost (or sensed that he was about to lose) his office to his nephew, and sought help from Tabinshwehti. (Note: While Arakanese chronicles are silent on the reason for the removal, Min Bin may have decided to remove Min Aung Hla for the latter's disastrous defeat at Padaung Pass in 1542.) Tabinshwehti was certainly interested in repaying the favor. He led a highly experienced and well equipped military, riding high after a string of victories. His high command had been joined by former Hanthawaddy generals like Saw Lagun Ein and Smim Payu, and Portuguese mercenaries like Diogo Soares. Nonetheless, Tabinshwehti was not yet ready to start another full-scale war, given the developing situation in Upper Burma where Ava was facing a serious rebellion backed by Mohnyin. A Mohnyin victory over Ava would have voided the treaty, and Toungoo's new northern border could again be contested. (Note: (Hmannan Vol. 2 2003: 148–149): The leader of the rebellion Sithu Kyawhtin was the former governor of Salin, now part of Tabinshwehti's empire, and the Ava commander of the failed raid of Salin in 1544–45.) Still, the infighting in Arakan was too good an opportunity to pass up. The king sent four regiments (4,000 troops, 1,000 horses, 100 elephants), led by Sit Tuyingathu, Smim Enaye, Smim Byatsa, and Smim Mawkhwin, to assist the viceroy of Thandwe.

== First campaign (1545) ==
At Mrauk U, Min Bin had expected the move. On 12 October 1545, he sent six army and naval regiments to Thandwe. (Note: Arakanese chronicles do not agree on the date of the start of the war. Razawin Haung and Maha Razawin (Saya Me) chronicles (Sandamala Linkara Vol. 2 1999: 32–35) say that the invasion occurred in 906 ME (29 March 1544 to 29 March 1545), and/or Monday, 8th waxing of Tazaungmon 907 ME (12 October 1545). Dhanyawaddy Ayedawbon (Sandamala Linkara Vol. 2 1999: 41) says the invasion began in 905 ME (30 March 1543 to 29 March 1544) during the reign of King Min Phalaung, which is rejected by Rakhine Razawin Thit chronicle. The standard Burmese chronicles (Maha Yazawin Vol. 2 2006: 173) and (Hmannan Vol. 2 2003: 227) say that the war began in 907 ME (30 March 1545 to 29 March 1546).) The Arakanese naval and land forces now included Portuguese mercenaries and their state-of-the-art firearms. The Royal Arakanese Navy was considered the best in the region, and was well regarded even by the Portuguese pirates. Min Bin's forces went on to drive out Min Aung Hla and his men from Thandwe before the four Toungoo regiments arrived. When the Toungoo forces did arrive, they were surprised to learn that the city had been taken over by the Mrauk U forces. Unprepared to take the heavily fortified city with their 4,000 men, the Toungoo command decided to retreat. The Burmese chronicles do not say that they even attempted to take the city but the Arakanese chronicles say the city's musket, mortar, and artillery fire drove back the invaders. Still according to the Arakanese chronicles, the Mrauk U forces followed up on the retreating Toungoo forces to the border, engaging them in several skirmishes in which many Toungoo troops were killed or taken prisoner. The Toungoo regiments were on the verge of being wiped out when Toungoo reinforcements arrived in time to break the encirclement, and retreat in good order. Min Aung Hla and his followers also made it to mainland Burma.

For the Toungoo high command, the campaign had been a disaster. But given the still fluid situation in Upper Burma, they decided to hold off further incursions in the remaining dry season. Tabinshwehti promised Min Aung Hla that he would put the former viceroy in his rightful place.

== Second campaign (1546–47) ==
=== Preparations ===
By mid-1546, the war in Upper Burma had reached a stalemate with the rump Ava Kingdom further splitting into two halves: the Mohnyin-controlled west of the Irrawaddy (present-day Sagaing Region and southern Kachin State), and Onbaung–Hsipaw-controlled eastern half (approximately, northern Mandalay Region and western Shan State). The Toungoo command cautiously decided that it was safe to launch a major campaign in Arakan in the following dry season. By October 1546, they had raised a sizable invasion force (19,000 men, 400 horses, 60 elephants) as well as a number of rearguard forces. Because of the challenging terrain of the Arakan Mountains, only 4000 men would invade by land from the Irrawaddy delta. Instead, over three quarters of the invasion forces (15,000 men) would be transported by sea using 800 war boats, 500 armored war boats, and 100 cargo boats. Toungoo now possessed a serious navy, mostly made up of ethnic Mon troops and commanded by former Hanthawaddy lords. The land army was commanded by Nanda Thingyan and Baya Nandathu. Meanwhile, a number of rearguard forces were deployed across the kingdom: the capital Hanthawaddy was defended by regiments commanded by Baya Gamani and Binnya Ein; the southern province of Martaban (present-day Mon State) by Saw Binnya U of Mawlamyine; Toungoo in east-central Burma by Mingyi Swe; Pyay in west-central Burma by Thado Dhamma Yaza I of Prome; and key towns along the northern border, Bagan, Salay, and Taungdwingyi by their local governors.

On the opposing side, the Arakanese kingdom's defenses were well prepared. The capital city of Mrauk U was protected by an extensive network of defensive structures. It was ringed by eleven forts, (Note: (Sandamala Linkara Vol. 2 1999: 30–31): The forts were: starting from east in clockwise direction, Yan Aung, Thanlyin, Mya Taung, Kala, Thaya, Ta-Let Taung, Peinne Taung, Nat Taung (northwest from Mrauk U), Shan Taung (northeast), Ingyin Taung, Kya-Khot Taung.) each of which was reinforced with walls, moats, trenches, and lakes. Canals were also set up to interconnect the ring forts. The capital itself was surrounded by a trench, three tiers of moats, and a stone wall with an extensive network of bastions atop the wall. Diversionary canals and lakes ensured the city's water supply in case of a long siege. These were the result of the multi-year defensive construction works project Min Bin launched right after his conquest of Bengal in 1533. The defense works were initially begun to protect the capital region from rampant seaborne raids by Portuguese pirates, and later expanded to defend against Toungoo invasions. (Note: (Sandamala Linkara Vol. 2 1999: 30–31): Min Bin started the program in 1533/34 (905 ME) after hearing that Tabinshwehti had conquered all of Hanthawaddy and all of Myanmar, and reasoning that he would be next. But in 1533/34, Tabinshwehti had not started any wars; his first campaign came in late 1534.) At the start of the campaign, the capital region was defended by no less than 20,000 troops. A 35-ship Arakanese fleet, largely manned by Portuguese mercenaries and commanded by Min Dikkha, sailed down to Cape Negrais to block a possible seaborne invasion.

=== Start of invasion ===
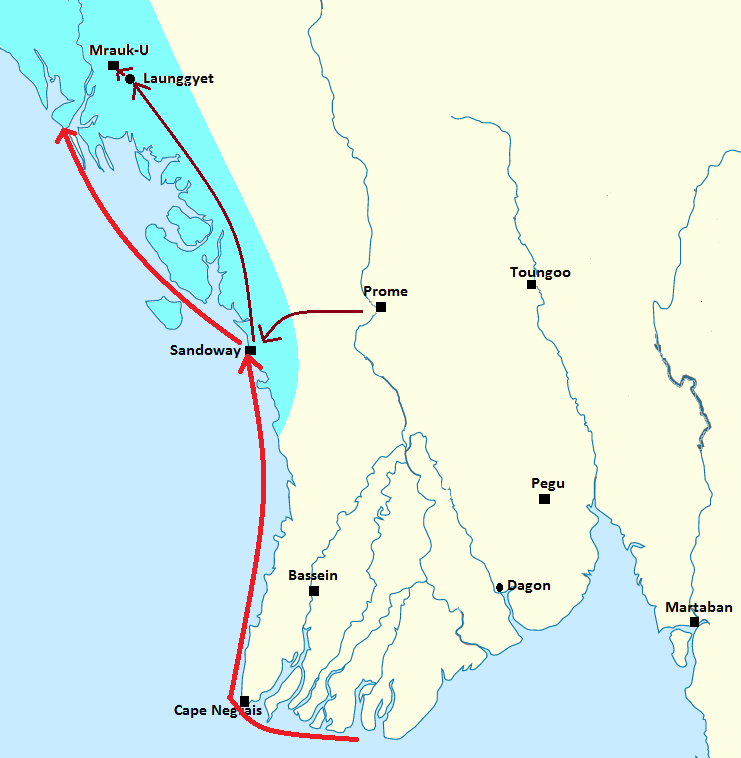
1546–47 campaign

On 28 October 1546, Toungoo naval and land forces began the campaign. (Note: (Maha Yazawin Vol. 2 2006: 175) and (Hmannan Vol. 2 2003: 229) say the campaign began on Monday, 4th waxing of Tazaungmon 908 ME but the date translates to Thursday, 28 October 1546.) The Toungoo high command, including Tabinshwehti, traveled by sea. (Note: (Harvey 1925: 158) says Bayinnaung marched with the army. But the chronicles (Hmannan Vol. 2 2003: 228–229) say that the army was commanded by Nanda Thingyan and Baya Nandathu, and that Bayinnaung assumed command only when the army was in southern Arakan.) The Mrauk U navy, waiting around Cape Negrais, initially thought about engaging Toungoo vanguard squadrons but decided against it when they saw the size of the invasion fleet. The fleet sailed up the Arakan coast unopposed, and dropped off troops south of Thandwe. They joined up with the army that had just crossed over the Arakan Mountains. Bayinnaung now assumed command of the combined armies. Then Toungoo land and naval forces converged on Thandwe. The Mrauk U navy defended the port but was defeated by sheer numbers. Mrauk U land forces evacuated Thandwe. Tabinshwehti appointed Min Aung Hla as the viceroy of Thandwe, and left Nanda Kyawhtin, Governor of Thanlyin, in charge of the city's defenses.

=== Battle of Mrauk U ===
By January 1547, Toungoo land and naval forces had left Thandwe for Mrauk U. The Arakanese defenses now awaited from their capital defense zone. A 5,000-strong elite army, equipped with foreign firearms, defended the capital while another 15,000 troops were posted at forts around the capital. By the second half of January, Toungoo forces converged onto the capital region. Invasion armies approached from the southeast while another army and war boats entered the Kaladan River from the southwest. Arakanese defenses successfully drove back the seaborne invasion force near Po-Chi Island. But they could not stop the Toungoo army at Launggyet, which fell on 23 January 1547. Tabinshwehti did not pause. Toungoo troops began their final push the very next day. They overcame Arakanese defenses, and breached the eastern outworks of Mrauk U. But Min Bin opened the sluices of the city's reservoirs, flooding out many Toungoo troops and creating an impassable moat. Toungoo forces were now reduced to shelling from afar. But their Portuguese supplied cannon had little effect against Mrauk U's stone walls.

The Toungoo forces were again in for a long siege. Although the Toungoo forces had successfully sacked other fortified cities after long sieges (Martaban in 1540–41, Prome in 1541–42), the Toungoo high command realized overcoming Mrauk U's elaborate defenses in four months before the rainy season would be difficult. Further complicating matters, Tabinshwehti received news that Siamese forces had occupied Dawei, which Toungoo had claimed. The Upper Tenasserim peninsula was defended by the garrison at Moulmein but the Toungoo command was nonetheless concerned. They advised against a long siege, warning that it would be extremely difficult to get back to Lower Burma during the monsoon season since the troops could not use the sea, and would have to pass the Arakan Yoma range, a difficult proposition even in the dry season. Given that the home country was still vulnerable to possible external attacks, they advised the king to accept a compromise with Min Bin. Likewise, Min Bin may have wanted a quick truce since he had heard that Tripuri marauders were raiding his northern possessions in Bengal down to Ramu.

=== Negotiations ===
Burmese and Arakanese chronicles disagree as to which side began the offer for negotiations. The Burmese chronicles say that a few days after the siege, the Mrauk U court sent four monks with a peace proposal. The Arakanese chronicles however say that Toungoo proposed first, stating that Min Bin at first refused to see Tabinshwehti's emissary Bayinnaung, and agreed to see him only on the second day. The negotiations went on for a few days. The Burmese chronicles say that Min Bin agreed to restore Min Aung Hla as the viceroy of Thandwe and seven southern townships in exchange for peace, and that the two kings exchanged gifts, including two war ships by Tabinshwehti. But the Arakanese chronicles say only that Tabinshwehti presented lavish gifts to Min Bin before retreating. At any rate, the two sides reached agreement on 30 January 1547, allowing an orderly withdrawal of Toungoo forces. (Note: (Sandamala Linkara Vol. 2 1999: 45) and (Hmannan Vol. 2 2003: 238): 9th waxing of Tabodwe 908 ME = 30 January 1547) Toungoo forces withdrew from Mrauk U beginning on 2 February 1547, but two regiments remained stationed at Thandwe for three more months per agreement.

== Aftermath ==
Both kingdoms went on to deal with respective intrusions. Min Bin immediately sent troops to drive Tripuri raiders out of East Bengal. Tabinshwehti waited until the next dry season (November 1547) before ordering his troops to drive out the Siamese from Tavoy. Emboldened by success, he invaded Siam in 1548 and again went on to lay siege to Phra Nakhon Si Ayutthaya. As in Mrauk U, Toungoo forces could not break through and had to retreat in 1549.

Despite the peace agreement, Mrauk U and Hanthawaddy remained wary of each other. Bayinnaung readily took in Prince Upayaza of Thandwe, who had lost the throne to Min Dikkha, awarded him the style Thiri Dhammathawka in 1554, and married him to one of his nieces.

== Legacy ==
The war not only preserved Arakan's independence but also had a long deterrence effect. Although Tabinshwehti and Bayinnaung had experienced failed campaigns before (against Hanthawaddy during 1534–37), this campaign was different. Mrauk U's defenses so impressed the Toungoo military leadership that they would not attempt to conquer the western kingdom again until 1580, only after they had conquered much farther away lands. (Note: (Lieberman 2003: 152): "Hanthawaddy now exercised suzerainty from Manipur to the marches of Cambodia and from the borders of Arakan to Yunnan. Notwithstanding its fragility, this was probably the largest empire in the history of Southeast Asia." The 1580–81 invasion of Arakan was the last campaign ordered by Bayinnaung.)
