= Min Bilu of Launggyet =

Min Bilu of Launggyet မင်းဘီလူး

King of Arakan
- Reign: 1274 - 1276; 1278-1279
- Coronation: 1277
- Predecessor: Nankyargyi
- Successor: Sithabin I
- Born: early 1250s Launggyet
- Died: approx. 1279 (aged around 26)
- Consort: Saw Mae Nyo; Saw Thamar; Saw Mar-La
- Issue: Min Hti
- House: Alawmaphyu
- Father: Nankyargyi
- Mother: Saw Paw May
- Religion: Therevada Buddhism

Min Bilu (Arakanese:မင်းဘီလူး, was the 7th monarch of the Laungyet Dynasty of Arakan.

== Reign ==
Min Bilu succeeded his father, Nankyakyi who had been assassinated on his way from Mahamuni Temple to the capital due to the tyrannical rule. As for a newly king, he was very unpopular and more hateful than his father throughout his reign simply for its abused power, neglecting religious duties and even cast away his infant son Min Hti, lucky the child was miraculously preserved. Widespread acts of tyrannies he committed, he was eventually killed in coup led by Sithabin I.
