= Nankyargyi =

Nan Kyargyi of Laungyet နန်းကျားကြီး
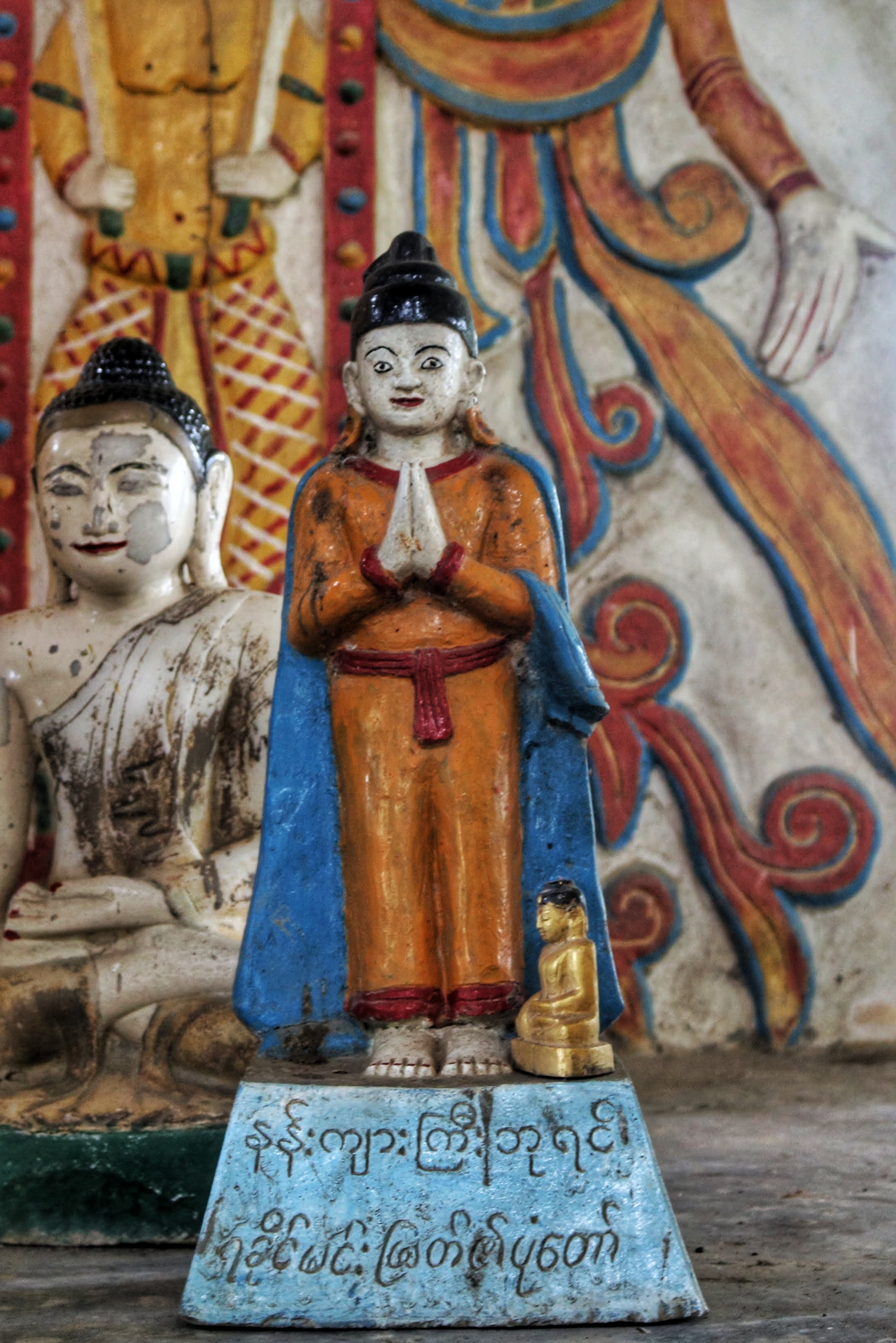

King of Arakan
- Reign: 1273 - 1277
- Coronation: 1277
- Predecessor: Saw Mon Gyi
- Successor: Min Bilu
- Born: 1242; Launggyet
- Died: 1277 CE (aged 35); Launggyet
- Consort: Saw Paw May; Saw Padomma; Saw Min Hpwar; Saw Phyu
- Issue: Min Bilu; Sithu; Min Pyo; Saw Thamar; Wikala Sanda
- House: Alawmaphyu
- Father: Saw Mon I
- Religion: Therevada Buddhism

Nan Kyargyi (Rakhine:နန်းကျားကြီး, was the 6th monarch of Laungyet Dynasty of Arakan. He is notorious for his cruelties and uptide ruled throughout the kingdom. People suffered heavily under his reign. He was hated and revolted by the people and later cursed to death.

== Reign ==
This king burdened the people with high taxes and demanded contributions of goods, which he hoarded in his palace. Through numerous acts of cruelty, he earned the hatred of many powerful individuals, including the priests, who, despite their religious vow to remain detached from worldly matters, were hostile toward him.

In the fourth year of his reign, he was eventually killed and succeeded by his son, Minbilu.

Preceded by Saw Mon Gyi	King of Launggyet; 1273 - 1277	Succeeded by Min Bilu
