= Arakan =

Historical area on the eastern coast of the Bay of Bengal

Arakan အာရက္ခ
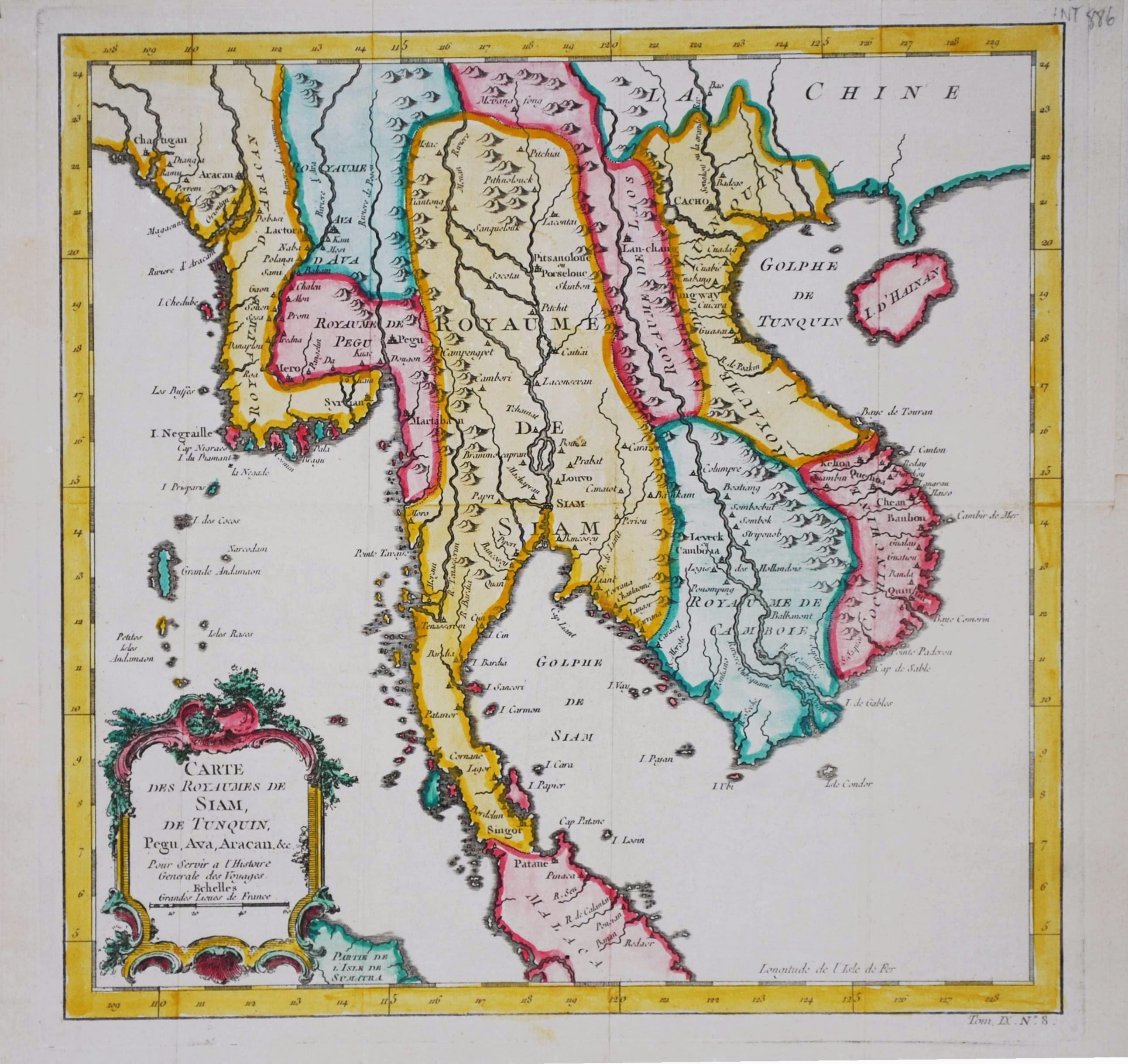
- Arakan at its peak
- Status: Dhanyawadi Kingdom (4th/6th century); Waithali kingdom (8th century-10th century); Lemro Period (11th century); Vassal of Bengal Sultanate (15th–16th century); Mrauk U Kingdom (15th century-18th century); Part of Konbaung Dynasty (18th century); Part of Imperial Japan (1942–1945); Part of British Burma (19th century); Province of Myanmar (1948–present)
- Capital: Dhanyawadi; Waithali; Pyinsa; Parein; Nareinzara Toungoo; Khreit; Launggyet (1251–1429; Mrauk-U (1430–1785); Sittwe (19th century-present)
- Official languages: Rakhine, Burmese
- Religion: Buddhism, Islam, Hinduism, Animism, Christianity

Arakan (/ˈærəkæn/ or /ˌɑːrəˈkɑːn/; Burmese: ရက္ခိုင် [jəkʰàɪɴ], Rakhine: အာရက္ခ [à.ɹəkʰa̼]), formerly romanized as Aracan, is the historical geographical name for the northeastern coastal region of the Bay of Bengal, covering present-day Bangladesh and Myanmar. Historically known as "Arakan" for several centuries, the region is now generally associated with the geographically smaller Rakhine State, situated in western Myanmar. The people of the region were known as the Arakanese. When Burma gained independence from Britain in 1948, the Burmese part of the region was called Arakan State. The Burmese military junta changed its name to Rakhine State in 1989 – along with the country's name being changed from Burma to Myanmar, and its capital name from Rangoon to Yangon, while the Burmese language name remained unchanged as မြန်မာ (Myanmar) and ရန်ကုန် (Yangon).

Arakan's first states can be traced to the 4th century. Arakan was one of the first Indianised kingdoms in Southeast Asia. It was home to the sacred Mahamuni sculpture of Buddha, which was later transferred to Mandalay by Burmese conquerors in the 18th century. For 356 years between 1428 and 1784, Arakan was ruled by the Kingdom of Mrauk U from the city of Mrauk U. In 1784, Arakan was annexed by the Konbaung Dynasty under the reign of King Bodawpaya. Arakan Division was a part of British India and later fell under British rule in Burma. During the 19th and early 20th centuries, Arakan was one of the world’s leading rice exporters. During World War II, several Arakan Campaigns were conducted by Allied forces against the Japanese as part of the Burma Campaign. After Burma became independent in 1948, Arakan saw a movement for autonomy. Human rights deteriorated in the country after the 1962 Burmese coup d'état. In 1974, a discriminatory citizenship law was enacted. In 1982, most Arakanese Muslims were stripped of citizenship. A segregated system of citizenship was introduced by Burma's military rulers. Both Arakanese Buddhists and Muslims experienced growing nationalism, including hopes for self-rule. The region was the site of the Rohingya genocide in 2016 and 2017.

== Etymology ==
According to Arthur Purves Phayre, a report by the Royal Geographical Society in November 1882 included a drafted paper by one Colonel Yule who discussed the oldest records of a sea route to China from the Middle East. Yule identified Arakan with the country of "Argyre" which means The Land of Silver or Silverland mentioned by the Greco-Roman geographer Claudius Ptolemy.

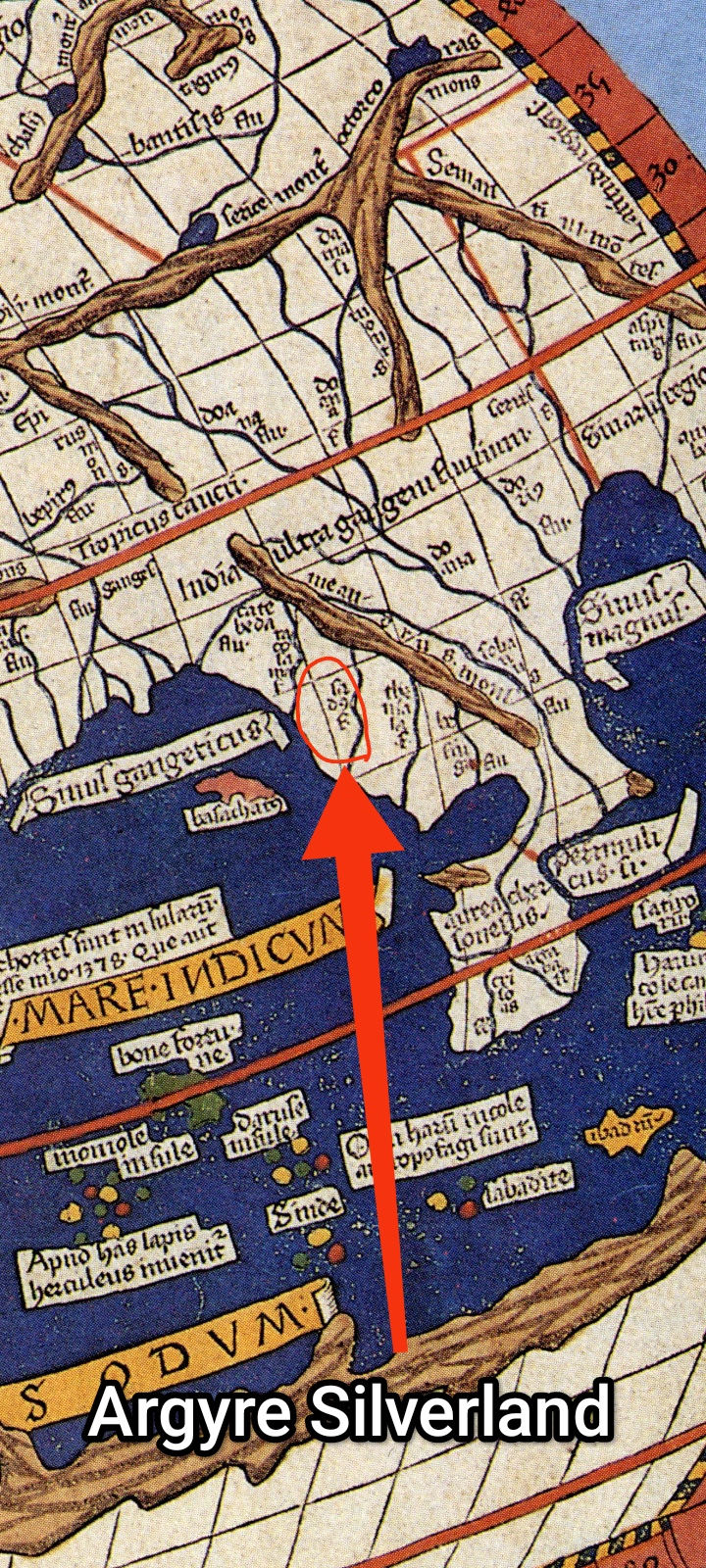
In 2nd Century AD, Arakan was known as Silverland (Argyre) according to Claudius Ptolemy's Map

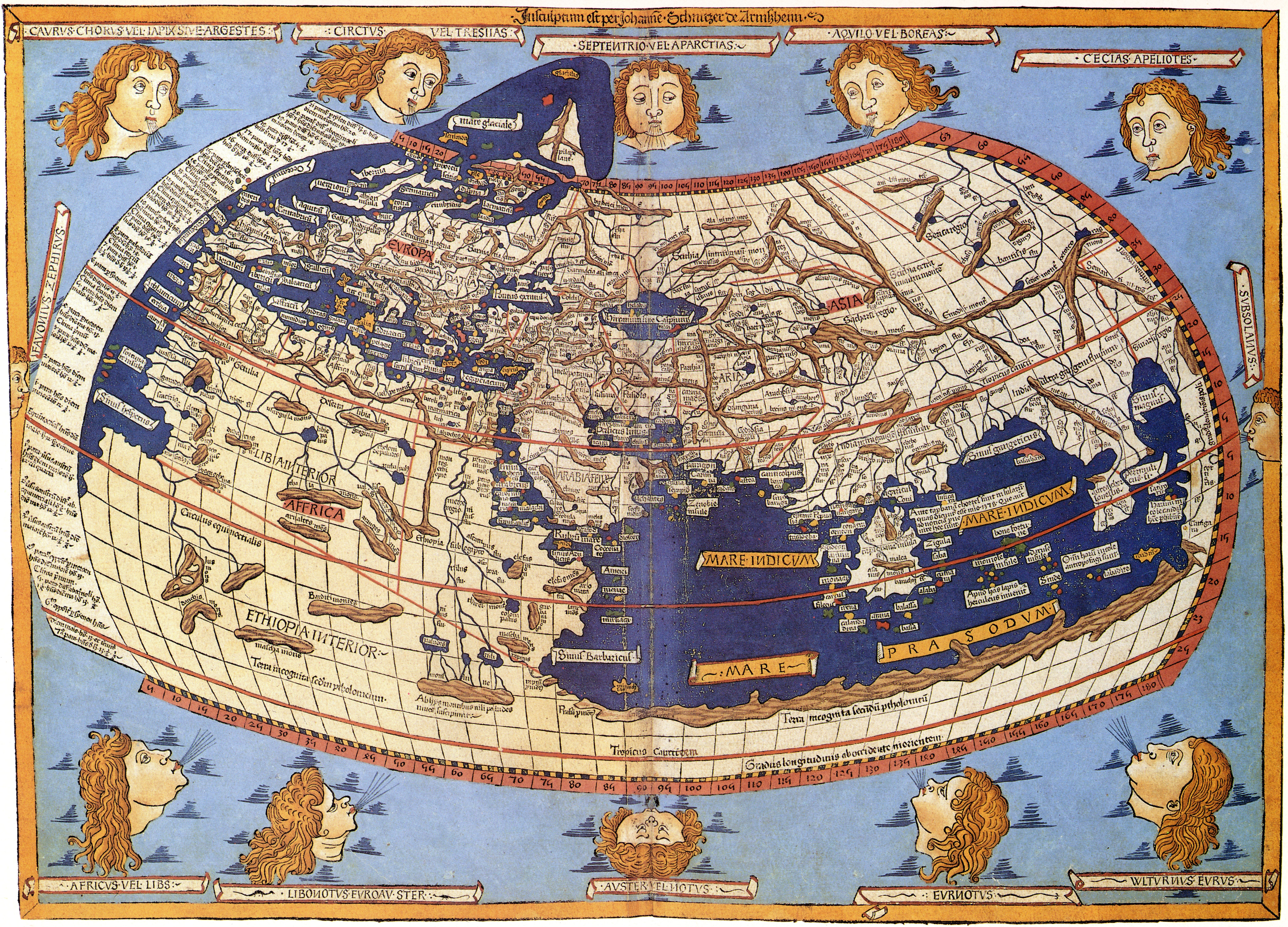
Ptolemy's World Atlas

According to Aananda Candra Inscription inscripted in 8th Century CE, Arakan Region was mention as Arakkhadesha(အာရက္ခဒေသ) by Ananda Candra King.

In early 15th Century CE, Niccolò de' Conti, a Venetian merchant and explorer mentioned Arakan as Rachani in his book the travels of Nicolo di Conti (c. A.D. 1396–1469) as recorded c. A.D. 1445 by Poggio Bracciolini.

Portuguese records spelled the name as Arracao. The name was spelled as Araccan in many old European maps and publications. The area constituted Arakan Division under British rule in Burma. The name “Arakan” State was in use until 1989 when the military government of Burma changed the Latin spelling name to Rakhine State.

== Geography ==
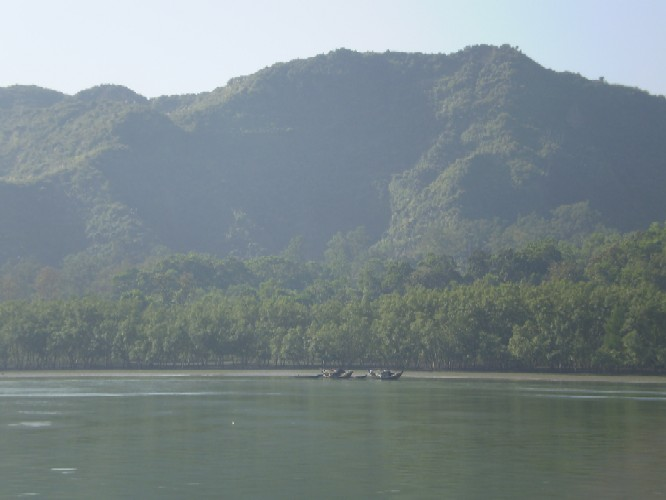
The Arakan Mountains seen from Maungdaw District by the banks of the Naf River.

The region known in Europe as Arakan is the 350 miles (560 km)-long eastern coastal shore of the Bay of Bengal. It comprises a long narrow strip of land and stretches from the banks of the Karnaphuli River on the border of the Chittagong Hills area in Bangladesh in the north to Cape Negrais in the south.

The Arakan region is shaped moreover like a crescent around the eastern Bay of Bengal. Its geography is wider in the north and becomes narrower southward. It is about 90 miles or 145 kilometres wide at its broadest. The Arakan Mountains (also called Arakan Yoma), a range that forms the eastern boundary of the region, isolates Arakan from the rest of Myanmar. The coast has several sizable large islands and multiple small islands and islets including Ramree Island, Cheduba, three Baronga Islands and Kun Chaung Island.

Arakan has a tropical monsoon climate (Köppen Am) with a dry season from mid-November to mid-April and an extreme monsoonal wet season from mid-April to mid-November. Between June and August when monsoonal winds drive saturated air onto the high Arakan Yoma, most of the region receives over 1,000 millimetres or 40 inches of rainfall per month.

The region's principal rivers from north to south are:

- Naf
- Mayu
- Kaladan
- Lemro
- Yaw Chaung
- Dalet Chaung
- Ma-e River
- La Muu Chaung
- Tann Lwey Chaung
- Toungup Chaung
- Thahtay Chaung
- Thandwe Chaung
- Gwa Chaung
- Tan Chaung

Only one-tenth of Arakan's generally hilly land is cultivated. Rice is the dominant main crop in the delta areas, where most of the population is concentrated. Other crops include coconut, Nipa palm, sugarcane, peanut, sesame, chili pepper, shallot, tobacco and other seasonal fruits and vegetables.

The major cities and main towns are Sittwe (Akyab), Mrauk U, Sandoway, Kyaukpyu, Kyauktaw, Ramree and Taungup.

== History ==
=== Antiquity ===
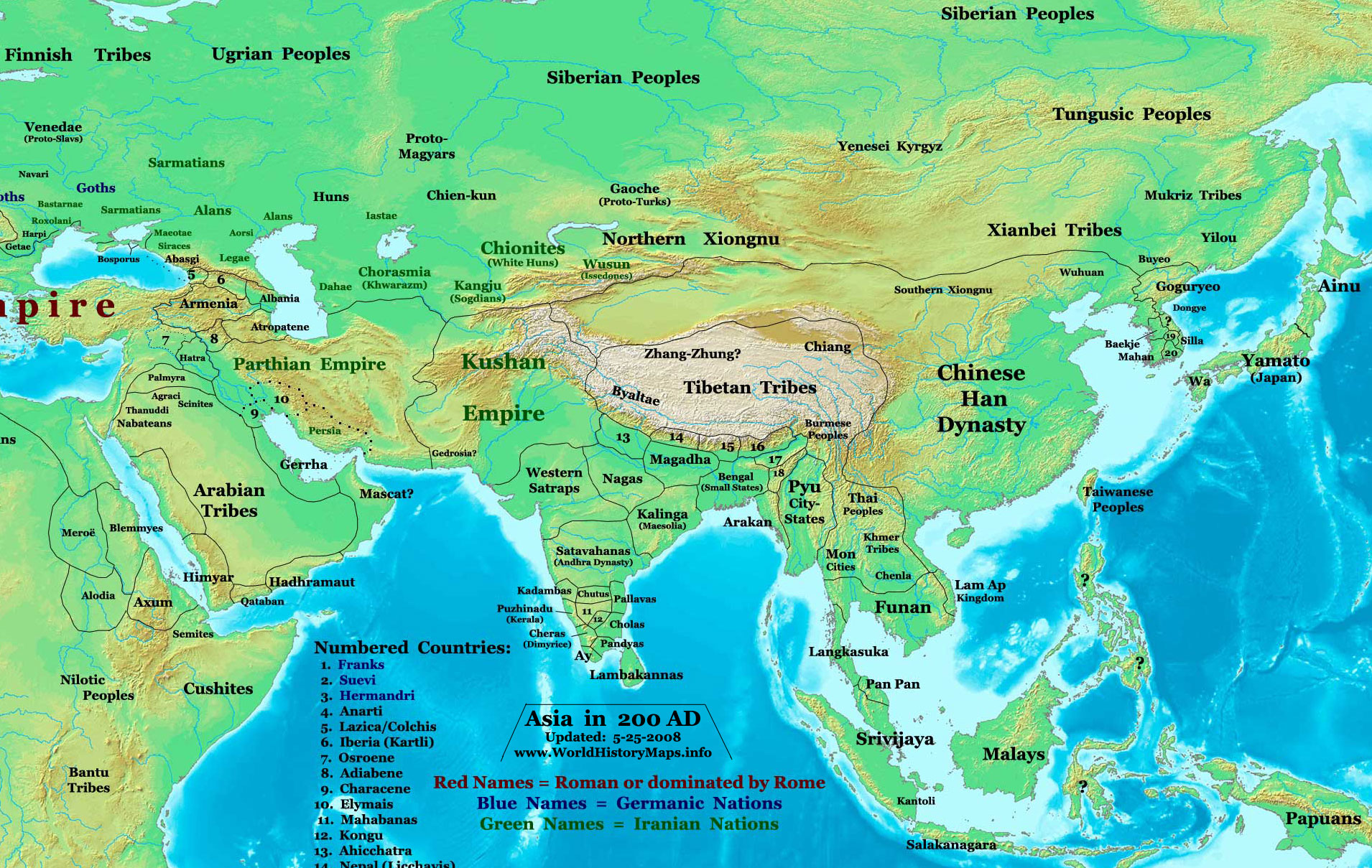
A map showing Arakan as a neighbor to the kingdoms of the Ganges delta in 200 CE

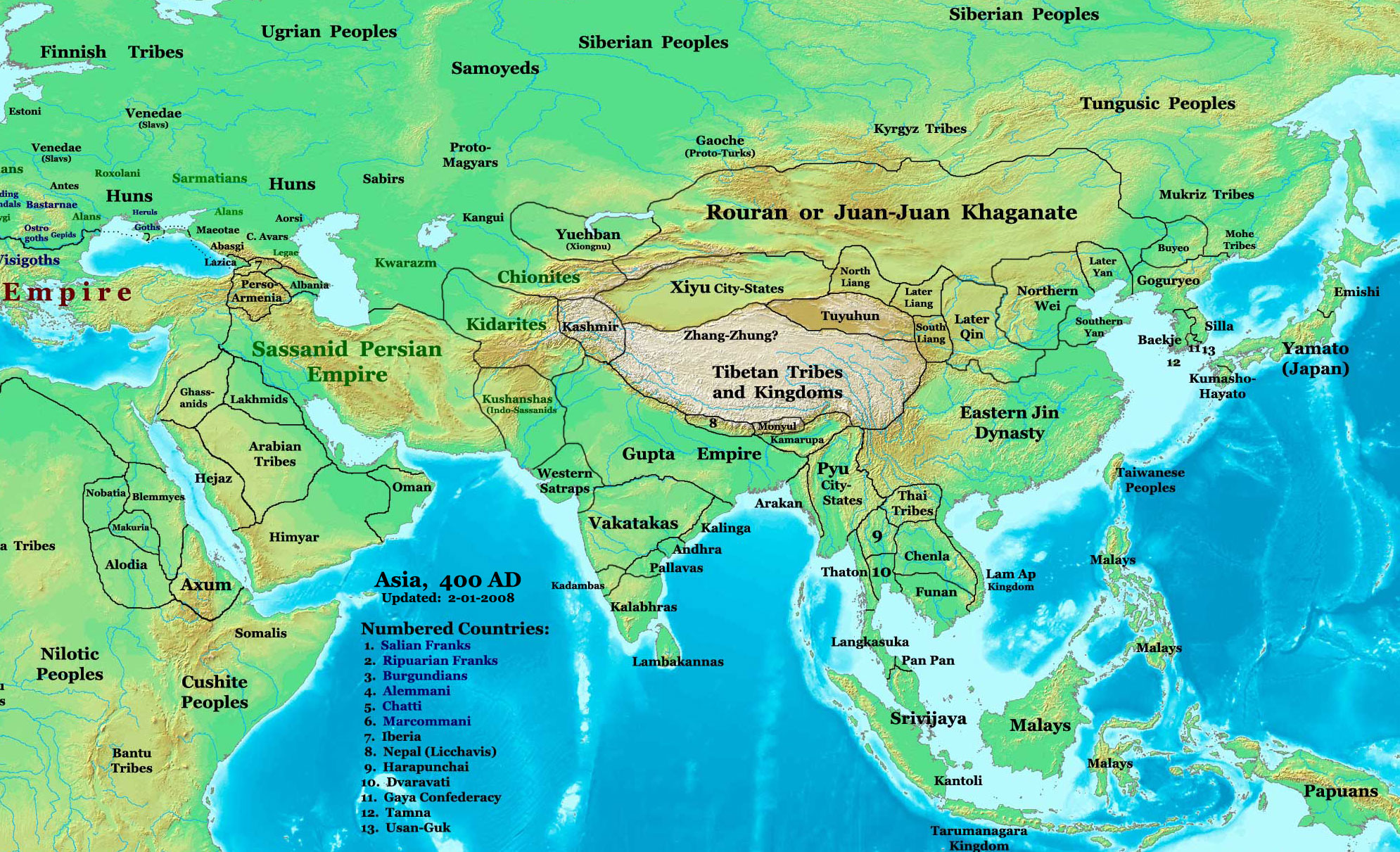
A map showing Arakan as a neighbor to the Indian Gupta Empire in 400 CE

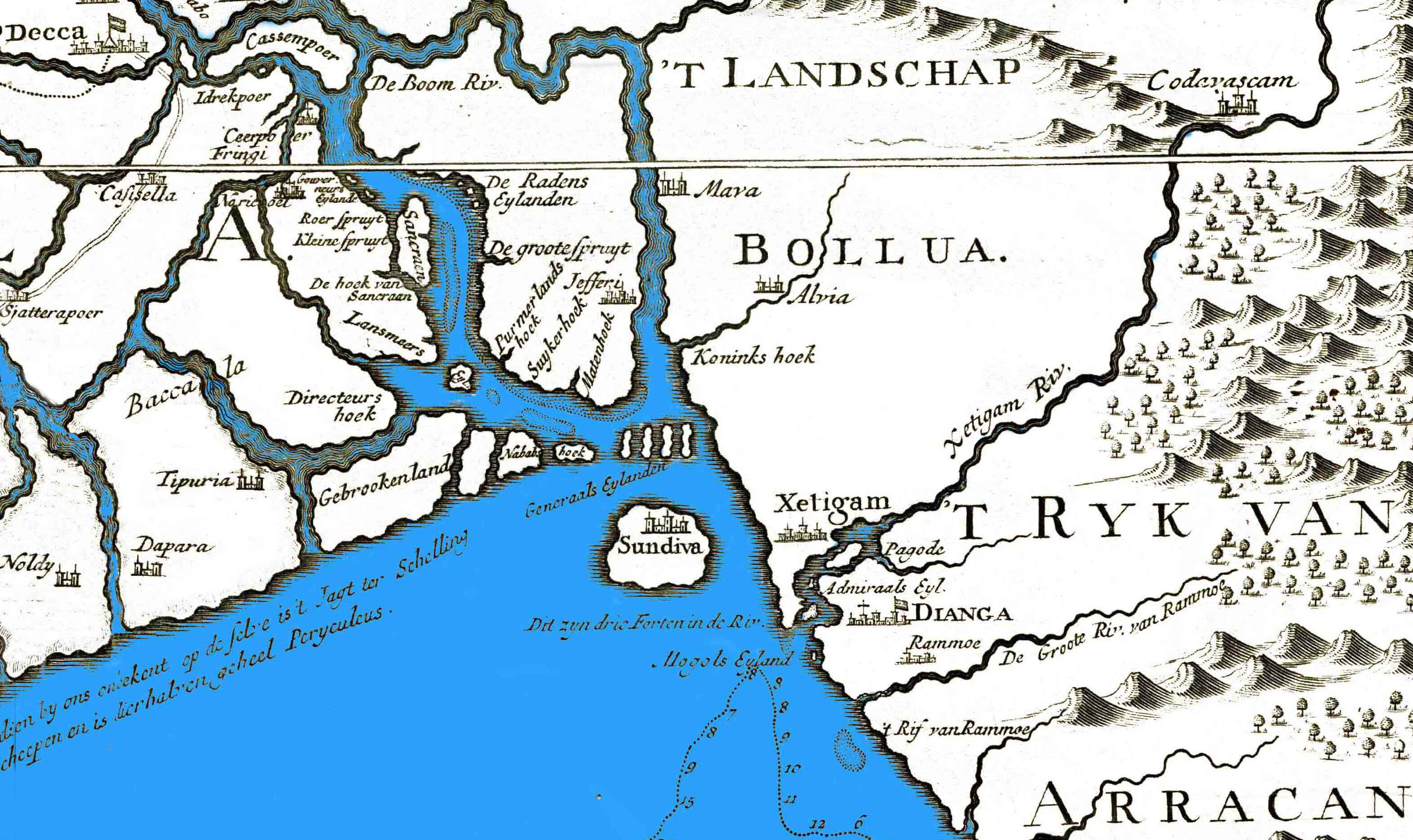
"Arracan" shown on an old Dutch map

Arakan has been recognized “as one among other Burmese kingdoms competing for the control of power in Lower Burma”. The cities of Bago, Bagan, and Inwa were centers of political power in Burma proper. In contrast, independent Arakanese states were based in the capitals of Dhanyawadi, Vesali, Laungyet, and Mrauk-U. The ruins of these cities are located in northern Arakan in proximity to the borderland of Bengal.

It is unclear who the earliest inhabitants were; some historians believe the earliest settlers included the Tibeto-Burman people Mro tribe but there is a lack of evidence and no clear tradition of their origin or written records of their history. Arakanese traditional history holds that Arakan was inhabited by the Rakhine since 3000 BCE, but there is no archaeological evidence to support the claim. According to British historian Daniel George Edward Hall, who wrote extensively on the history of Burma, "The Burmese do not seem to have settled in Arakan until possibly as late as the tenth century AD. Hence earlier dynasties are thought to have been Indian, ruling over a population similar to that of Bengal. All the capitals known to history have been in the north near modern Akyab".

Arakan came under strong Indic influence from the Indian subcontinent, particularly the ancient kingdoms of the Ganges delta. Arakan was one of the first regions in Southeast Asia to adopt Dharmic religions. It became one of the earliest Indianized kingdoms in Southeast Asia. Buddhist missionaries from the Mauryan Empire traveled through Arakan to other parts of Southeast Asia. Paul Wheatley chronicled the "Indianization" of Arakan.

According to Pamela Gutman, "Arakan was ruled by kings who adopted Indian titles and traditions to suit their own environment. Indian Brahmins conducted royal ceremonies, Buddhist monks spread their teachings, traders came and went and artists and architects used Indian models for inspiration. In the later period, there was also influence from the Islamic courts of Bengal and Delhi". Gutman writes that “the maintenance of a state appropriate to kingship required the ministrations of increasing numbers of craftsmen and artisans, the most skilled of whom were often accommodated within the royal compound. It required the labour of a peasantry who contributed the surplus produce of their fields as a kind of tax in kind for the support of the court, and a band of armed retainers who acted as household guards, organised the peasantry as militia and enforced the authority of the ruler. Material defences – walls and moats protecting the palace and the city – were constructed and the city-state, the nagara, evolved. These transformations saw the tribal chieftain replaced by a divine king, shaman by brahmin priest, tribesman as cultivators by peasants, tribesmen as warriors by an army, and favoured the development of occupational specialisation. They were reflected in the conversion of the chief’s hut into a palace, the spirit house into a temple, the object of the spirit cult into the palladium of the state, and the boundary spirits which previously had protected the village into Indianized Lokapalas presiding over cardinal directions. This process can clearly be traced in Arakan, which received Indian culture by land from Bengal and by sea from other parts of India”.

=== First states and cities ===
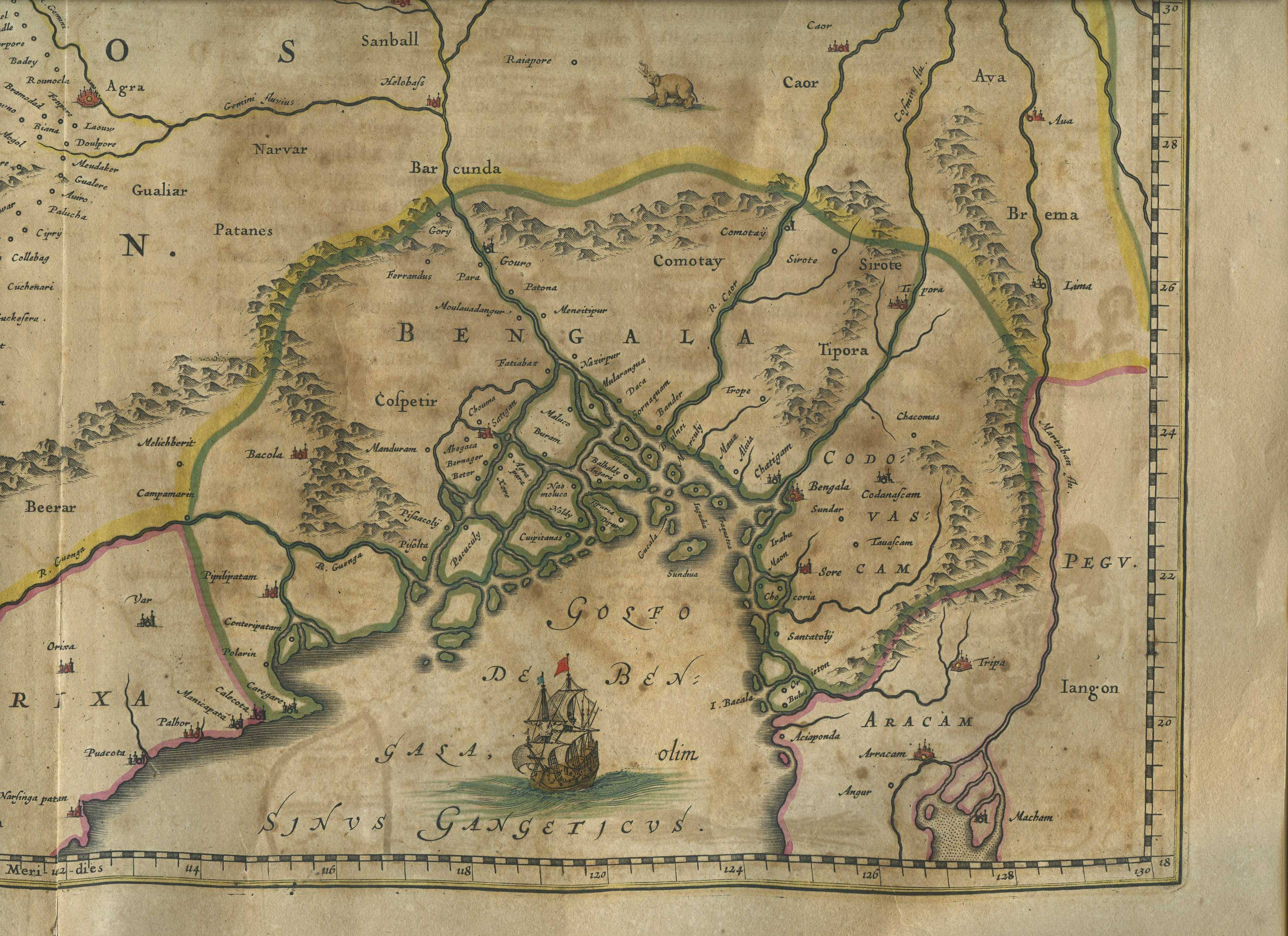
Bengal and Arakan in 1638

According to Arakanese old legendary Chronicles, the first Arakanese state flourished in Dhanyawadi between the 27th Century BC to 6th Centuriy CE. The city was the center of a large trade network linked to India, China and Persia. Power then shifted to the city of Waithali, where the Candra dynasty ruled. Waithali became a wealthy trading port. The Candra-ruled Harikela state was known as the Kingdom of Ruhmi to the Arabs. Evidence points to the use of the ancient Bengali script in Arakan. The Anandacandra inscription recorded the reign of the Candra dynasty.

Since in the 8th century, Arab merchants began conducting missionary activities in southeast Asia. Some researchers have speculated that Muslims used trade routes in the region to travel to India and China. A southern branch of the Silk Road connected India, Burma and China since the Neolithic period. It is unclear whether the Rakhine people were one of the tribes of the Burmese Pyu city-states because the people in those states at the time spoke a Tibeto-Burman language while Arakan (Rakhine) speakers are from the Sino-Tibetan language family. They began migrating to Arakan through the Arakan Mountains in the 9th century. The Rakhines settled in the valley of the Lemro River. Their cities included Sambawak I, Pyinsa, Parein, Hkrit, Sambawak II, Myohaung, Toungoo and Launggret.

=== Le-Mro Period ===
Following the decline of the Waithali Kingdom around 818 CE, the political center of Arakan shifted to the Lemro Valley. Four principal cities known as Pyinsa, Parein, Hkrit, and Launggyet served as successive capitals.

The Lemro period was an era in Arakanese history that lasted from the 9th to the 15th centuries CE. It is defined by the establishment of several successive capitals along the Lemro River, known collectively as "Lemro," which translates to "four cities" in the Rakhine language.

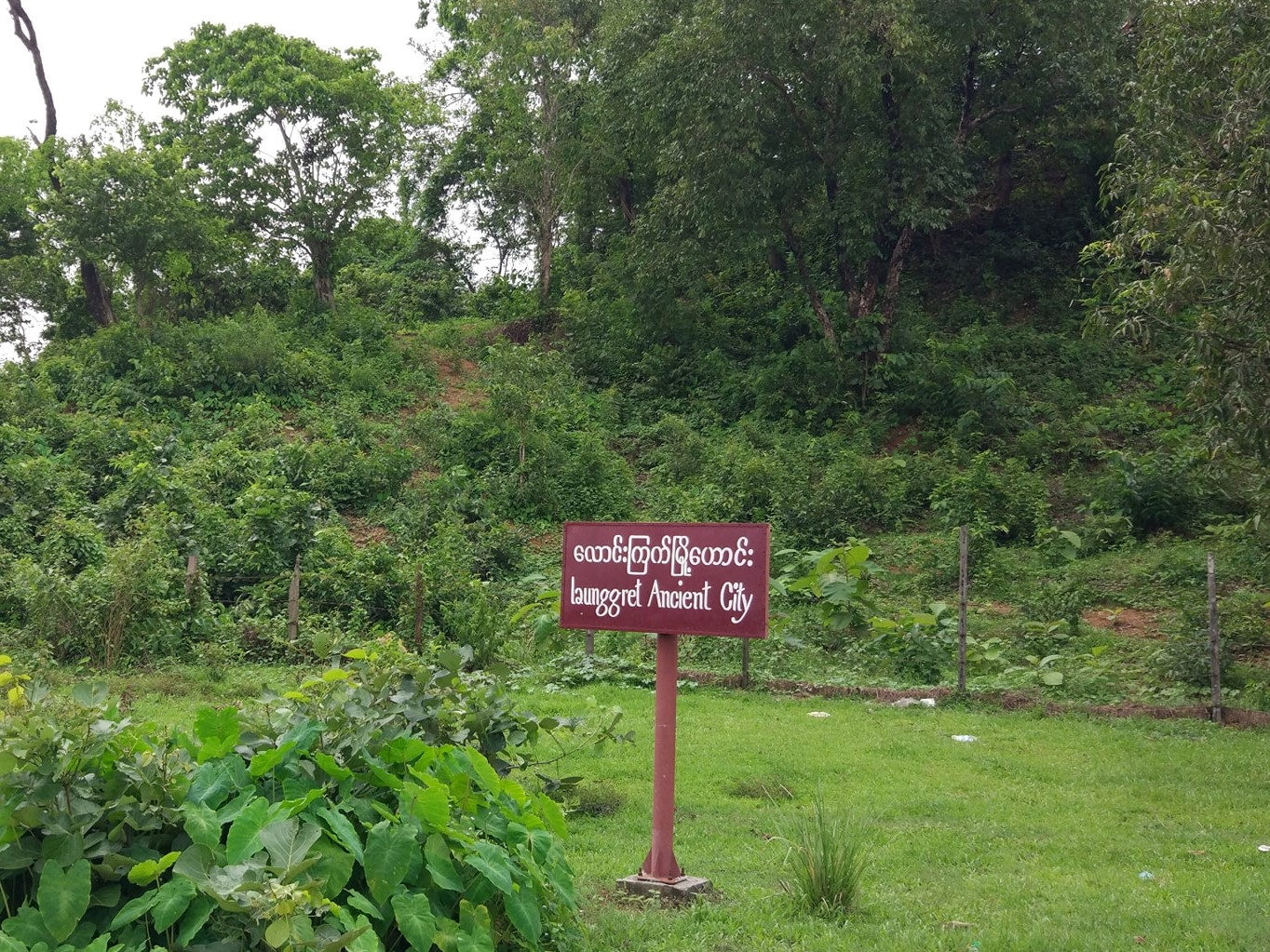
Historical ruins of the ancient Launggyet city.

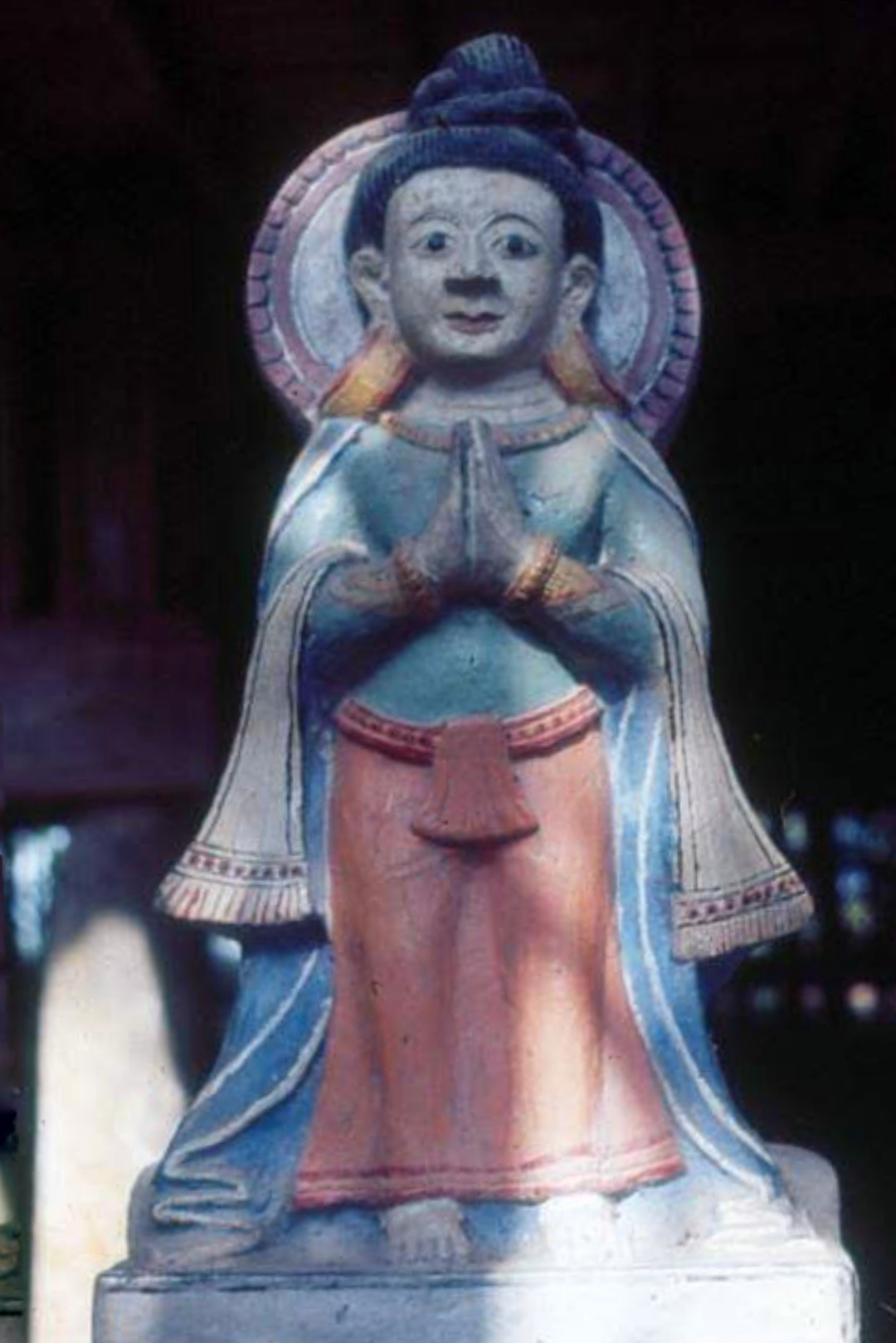
King Min Hti of Arakan

The Launggyet Dynasty (1251–1429) later marked the final phase of the Lemro period in Arakan's history.

=== Kingdom of Mrauk U ===
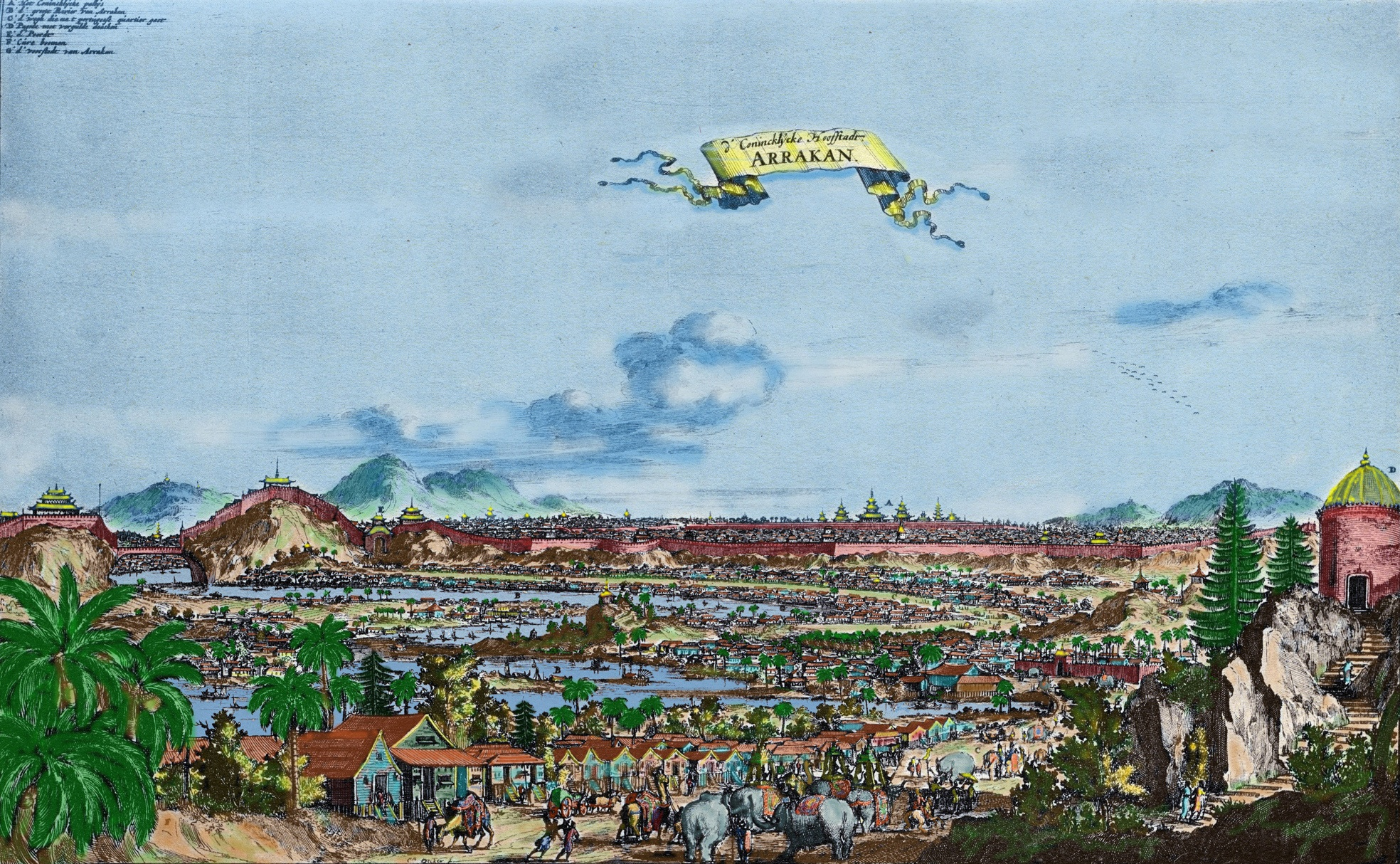
In the 17th century, Mrauk U was home to a diverse population including Buddhists, Muslims, Christians and Hindus; from Arakan, Burma proper, Bengal, North India, Northeast India, the Middle East and Europe

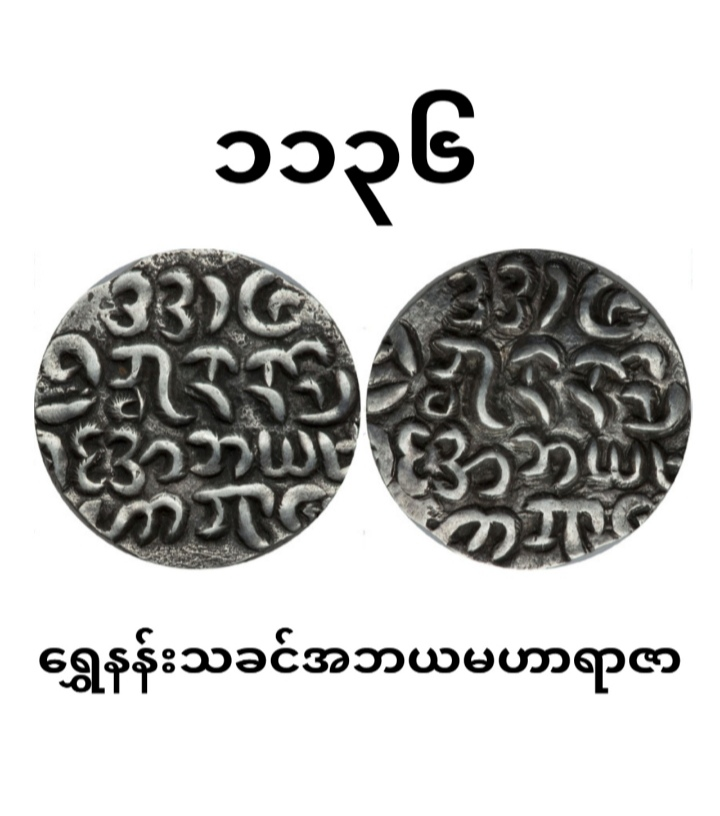
Coin which was stamped by Arakanese King Apaya Maha Raza at the year of Arakanese Era 1136 (AD 1774)

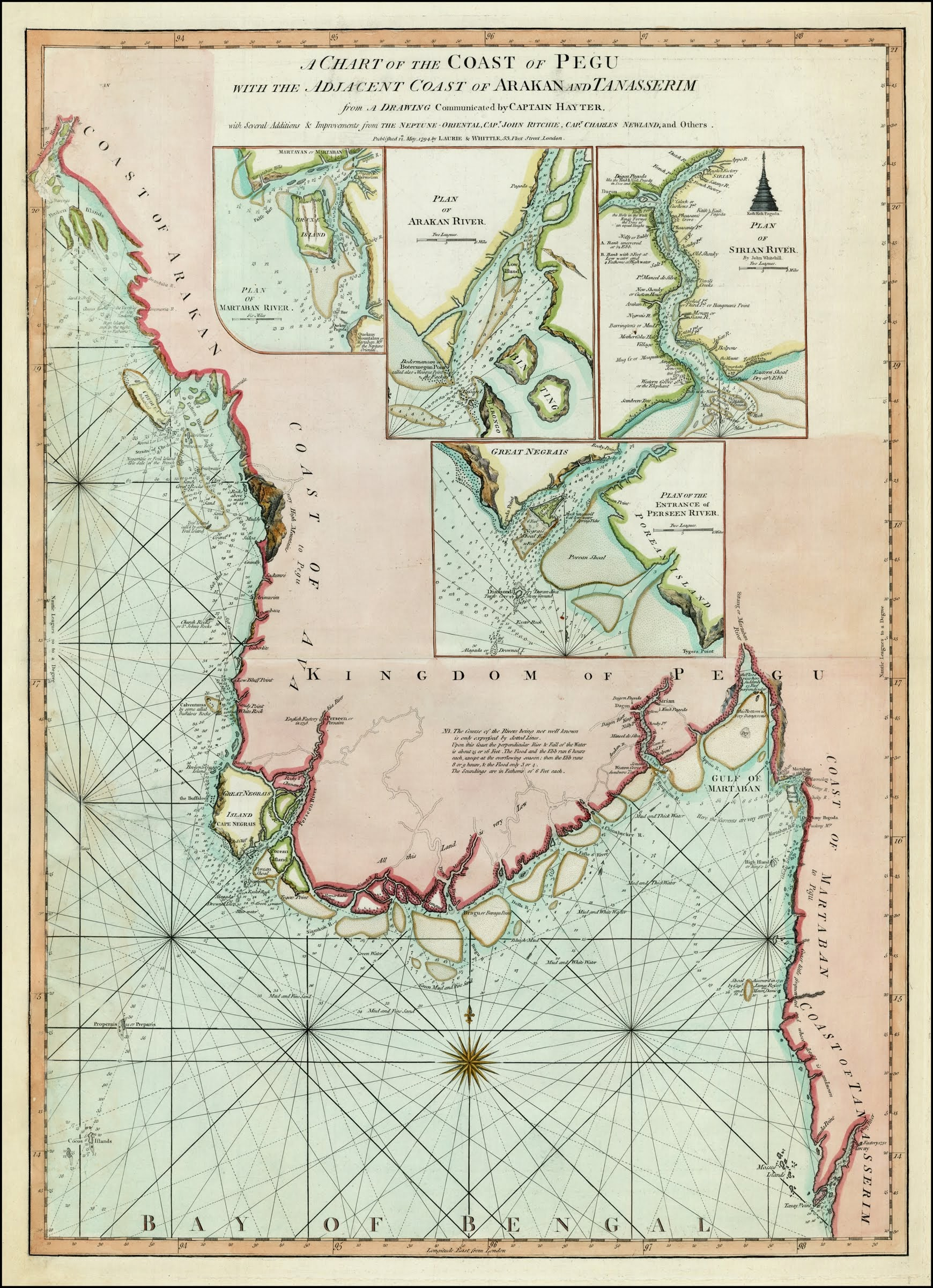
1798 AD map showing Arakan and its river route

Arakan was a kingdom under siege in the 14th and 15th centuries. Mon invaders from Lower Burma conquered southern Arakan, including Sandoway. In 1404, Burmese forces from Upper Burma conquered Laungyet. The ruler of Laungyet fled to the Bengal Sultanate during the Burmese invasion. According to Jacques Leider, Min Saw Mun fled to Bengal in 1406 and returned to Arakan in 1428. Min Saw Mun arrived in Bengal for self-imposed exile during the reign of Sultan Ghiyasuddin Azam Shah (1389–1410) and left for Arakan during the reign of Sultan Jalaluddin Muhammad Shah (1415–1432). An academic consensus prevails that Min Saw Mun returned to Arakan, regained the throne and shifted the capital from Laungyet to Mrauk-U (erstwhile Mrohaung). The establishment of the capital at Mrauk-U heralded the most significant period in the history of Arakan. A new cosmopolitan kingdom emerged. In Arakanese traditional history, the restoration of the throne is glorified.

Bengali literary texts and coinage are among the chief primary sources to detail the history of Arakan during the Mrauk-U period. Min Saw Mun regained control of the throne with military assistance from the Bengal Sultanate. Arakan emerged as a vassal state of Bengal. Burhanuddin became the first Muslim defense minister of Arakan.

Evidence points to an alliance between Bengal and Arakan to restore Min Saw Mun to the throne. The most significant evidence is that all post-restoration Arakanese rulers adopted Muslim titles in addition to native titles. This indicates a positive relationship with the court of Bengal. The throne of Tripura was also restored by the Bengal Sultanate. Arakanese traditional history states that Arakan was a tributary state of the Bengal Sultanate for a certain period.

In the accounts of foreign travelers like Fray Sebastian Manrique and Bengali members of the Arakanese court, the kings were referred with their Muslim titles. But the kings did not convert to Islam and remained Buddhists. Between 1430 and 1638, a total of 16 kings are recorded to have used Muslim titles (nicknames).

The Arakan region remained predominantly Buddhist, with the majority known today as the Rakhine people. Although all the kings of Arakan had Muslim titles (nicknames), none of them adopted the religion; they remained as Buddhists.

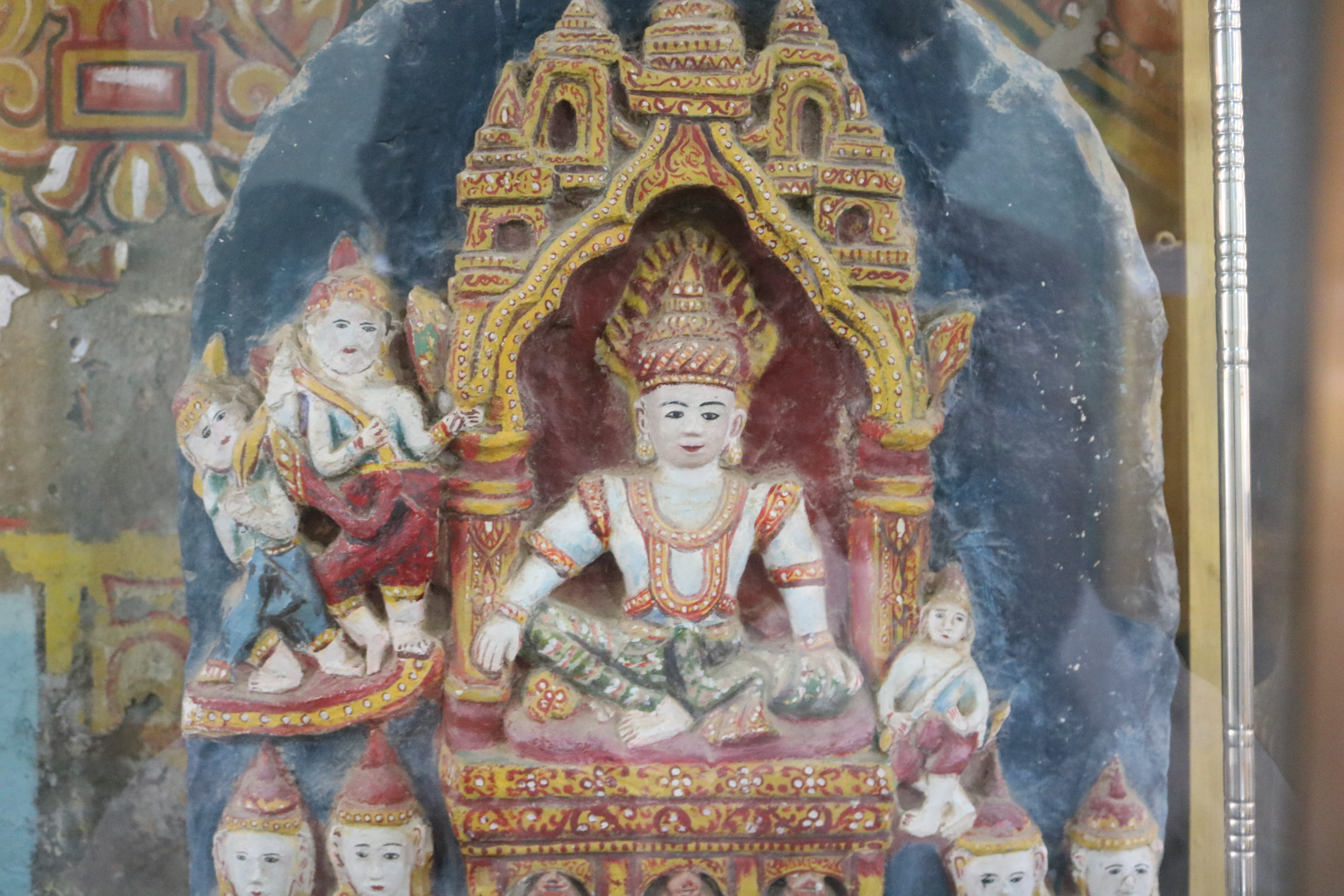
King Min Razagyi on Throne

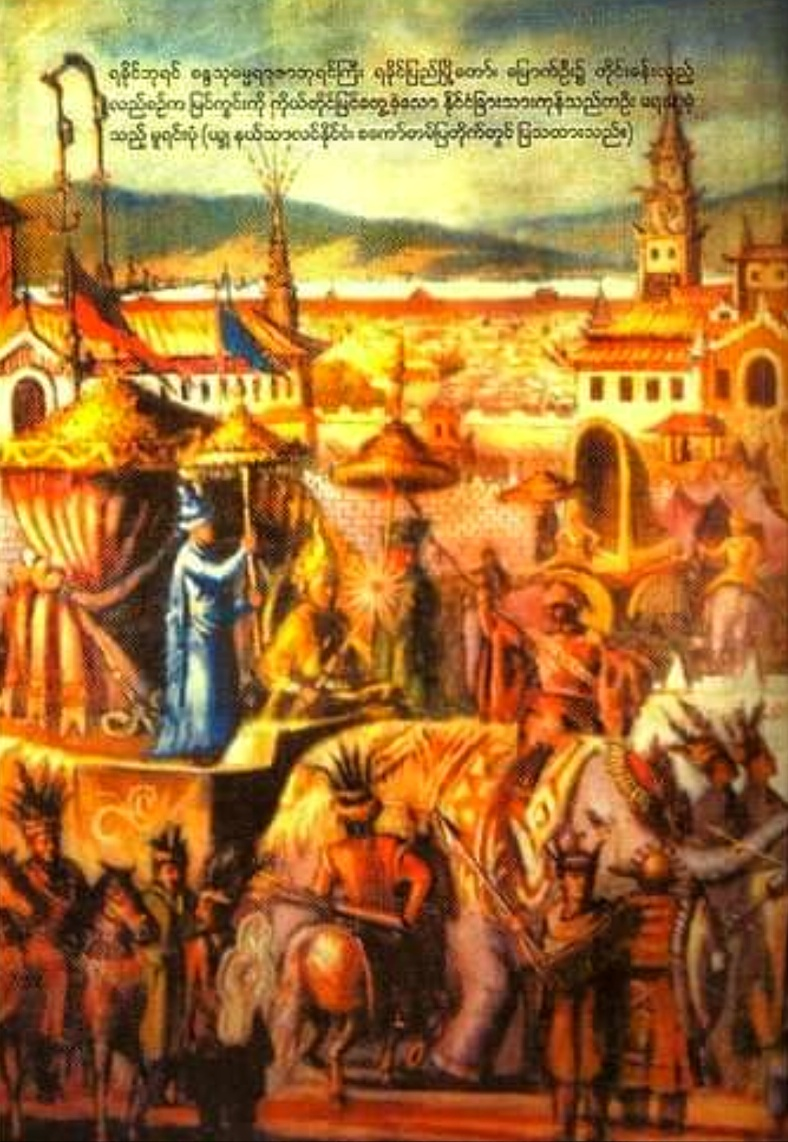
King Sanda Thudhamma of Arakan.

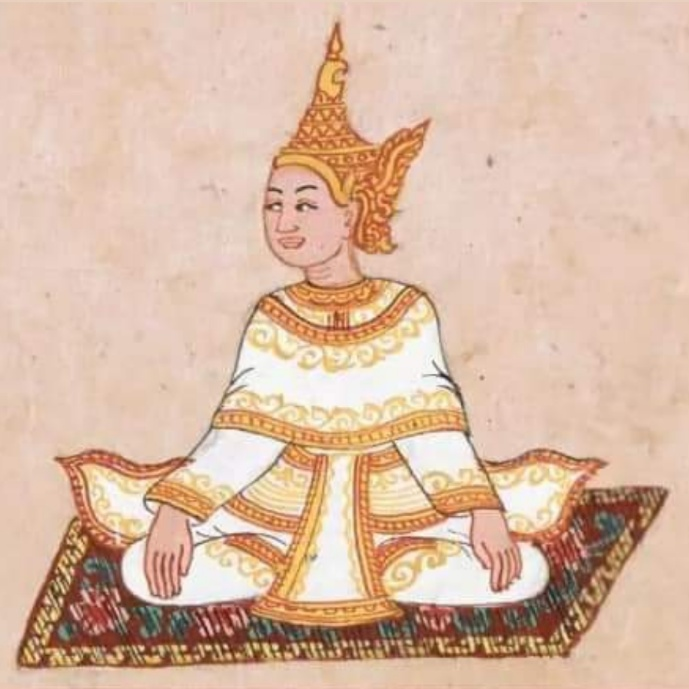
Maha Thammada, the last king of Arakan

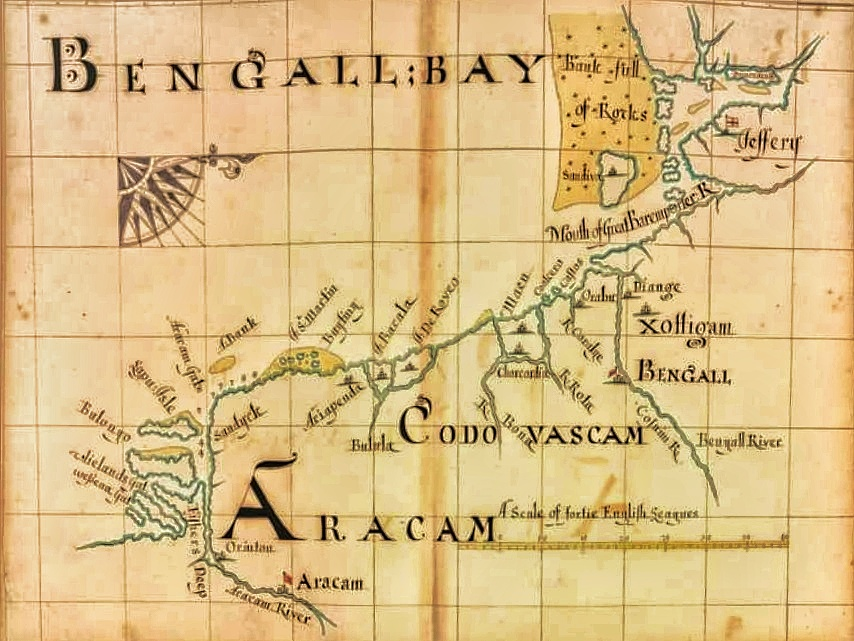
Aracan(Arakan) in Buccaneer Atlas 1690 AD

List of the Kings of Arakan with Muslim titles (1430–1638)
	Native name	Muslim title	Reign
1.	Min Saw Mon	Suleiman Shah	1430–1434
2.	Min Khari	Ali Shah I	1434–1459
3.	Basawpyu	Kalima Shah	1459–1482
4.	Min Dawlya	Maw Ku Shah	1482–1492
5.	Basawnyo	Muhammad Shah	1492–1494
6.	Ranaung	Nuri Shah	1494
7.	Salingatha	Sheikh Abdullah Shah	1494–1501
8.	Min Raza	Ilyas Shah	1501–1513
9.	Min Saw O	Zala Shah	1515
10.	Thazata	Ali Shah II	1515–1521
11.	Kasabadi	Jali Shah	1523–1525
12.	Min Bin	Zabauk Shah	1531–1553
13.	Min Palaung	Sikandar Shah I	1571–1593
14.	Min Raza Gyi	Salim Shah	1593–1612
15.	Min Khamaung	Hussain Shah	1612–1622
16.	Thiri Thudamma Raja	Sikandar Shah II	1622–1638

The slave trade was the backbone of the Arakanese economy. Leider explains that “Arakan was sadly famed as the main provider of slaves in the Bay of Bengal” unlike Bengal's trade in muslin, silk, shipbuilding, and saltpeter. Arakan also became home to a growing Muslim community. They included Muslim traders from the Indian Ocean trade network and Sufi missionaries who established themselves along the coasts of Arakan. More Muslims were found among the thousands of inhabitants of Bengal who were forcibly deported to Arakan. They included artists, craftsmen, soldiers, and highly educated people who were employed by the royal court.

The kings imported labour, bureaucrats and artisans by raiding Lower Burma and southeast Bengal. They provided the craftsmen, guards, and artists at the palace; the rowers for the fleet, or the farmers on the royal lands. Some became ministers in the royal court. The heavy presence of Bengali Muslims was documented by Arakanese and European records. The Mons were deported after the fall of Pegu; they formed a group which could still be identified until the end of the eighteenth century. Afghan soldiers fleeing the Mughal advance and Portuguese traders and adventurers settled in Arakan. They accepted appointments in the army. The hill chiefs of northern and southern Arakan provided troops who were ethnic Thet, Mrung, Chin, or from other small minority groups.

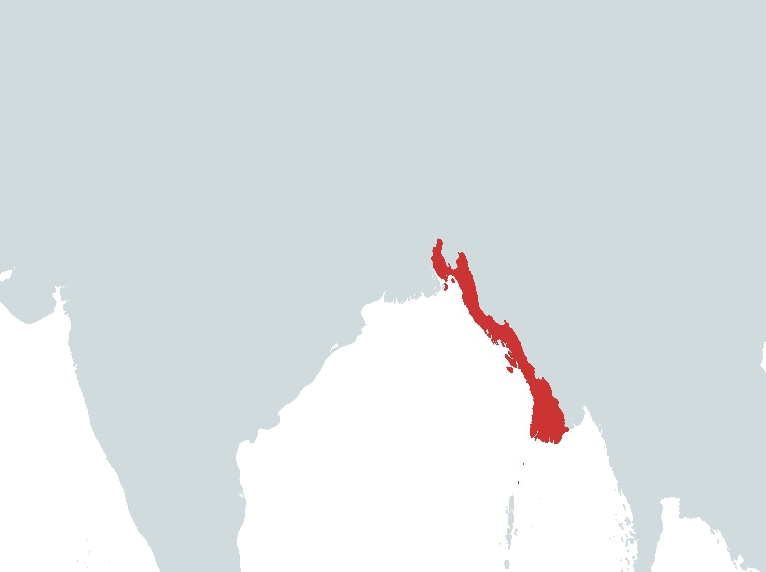
Extent of the Mrauk-U Kingdom at its probable peak during the mid-16th century

King Min Khayi was the first to challenge Bengali hegemony by expanding Arakanese controlled area up to North, conquering Ramu and challenged to Chittagong. His son and successor King Ba Saw Phyu defeated Bengal Sultan Rukunuddin Barbak Shah in 1459 and occupied the Chittagong but that period ain't prolonged. After Min Dawlya, Arakan lost the territory of Chittagong temporarily until Min Bin took over, who conquered Chittagong again and further Northwest to Dhakha.

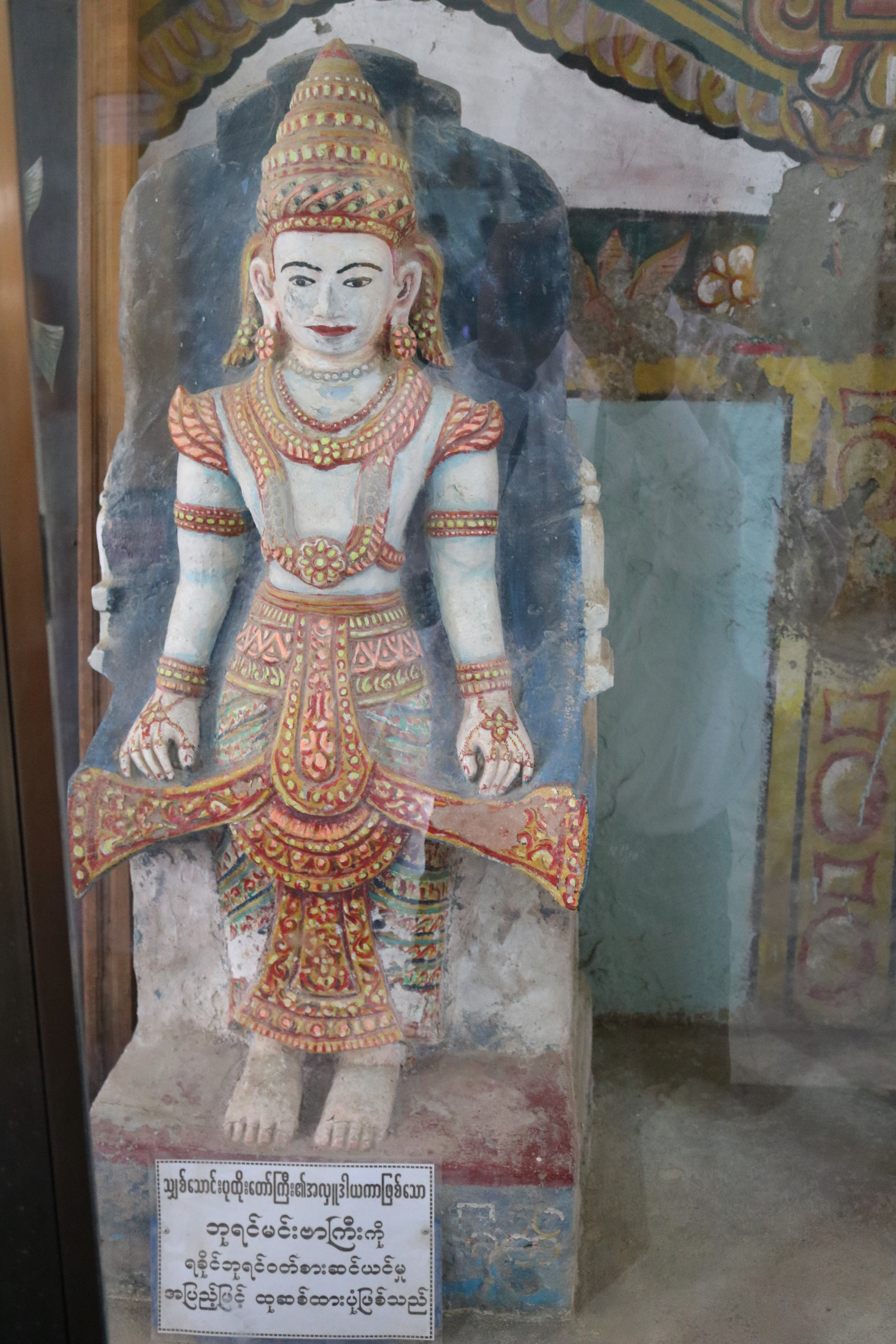
King Min Bin or Min Bar Gree Statue

Taking advantage of the Mughal Empire's invasion campaign of Bengal, the Arakan navy and pirates dominated a coastline of 1000 miles, spanning from the Sundarbans to Moulmein.

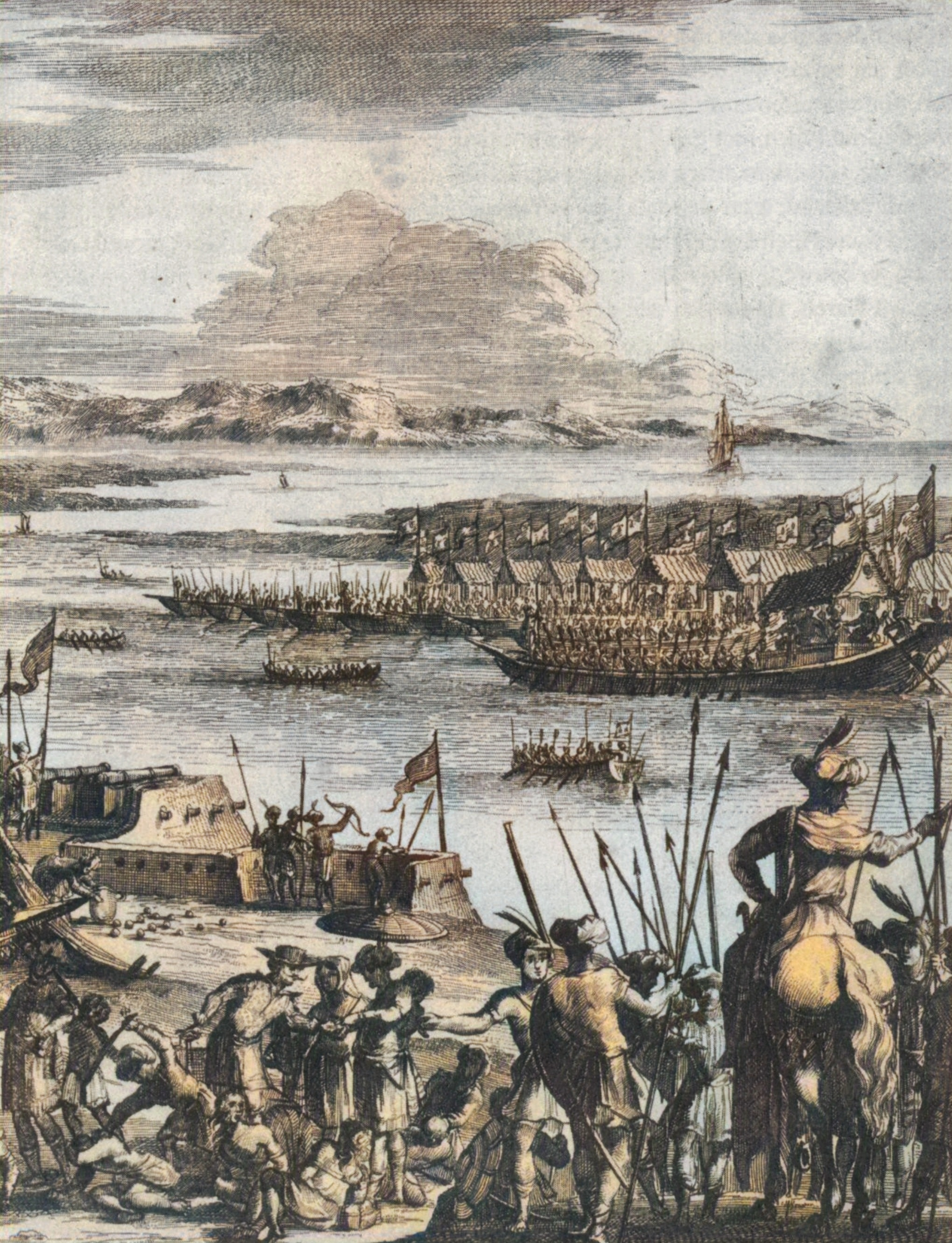
Arakanese Galleass at Ichamatic River near Pipli, West Bengal was in Battlefields Ready Position against Moguls Cavalry.

The kingdom's coastline was frequented by Arab, Dutch, Danish and Portuguese traders. Control of the Kaladan River and Lemro River valleys led to increased international trade, making Mrauk U prosperous. The reigns of Min Phalaung, Min Razagri and grandson Min Khamaung strengthened the wealth and power of Mrauk U. Arakan colluded in the slave trade with the Portuguese settlement in Chittagong and with Dutch traders. After conquering the port city of Syriam in the early 1600s, Arakan appointed the Portuguese mercenary Philip De Brito e Nicota as the governor of Syriam. But Nicota later transferred Syriam to the authority of Portuguese India. Even after independence from the Sultans of Bengal, the Arakanese kings continued the custom of maintaining Muslim titles. They compared themselves to Sultans and fashioned themselves after Mughal rulers. They also continued to employ Indians and Muslims from Bengal in prestigious positions within the royal administration. The court adopted Indian and Islamic fashions from neighbouring Bengal. Mrauk U hosted mosques, temples, shrines, seminaries and libraries. Syed Alaol and Daulat Qazi were prominent poets of Arakan. The Santikan Mosque was built in Mrauk U.

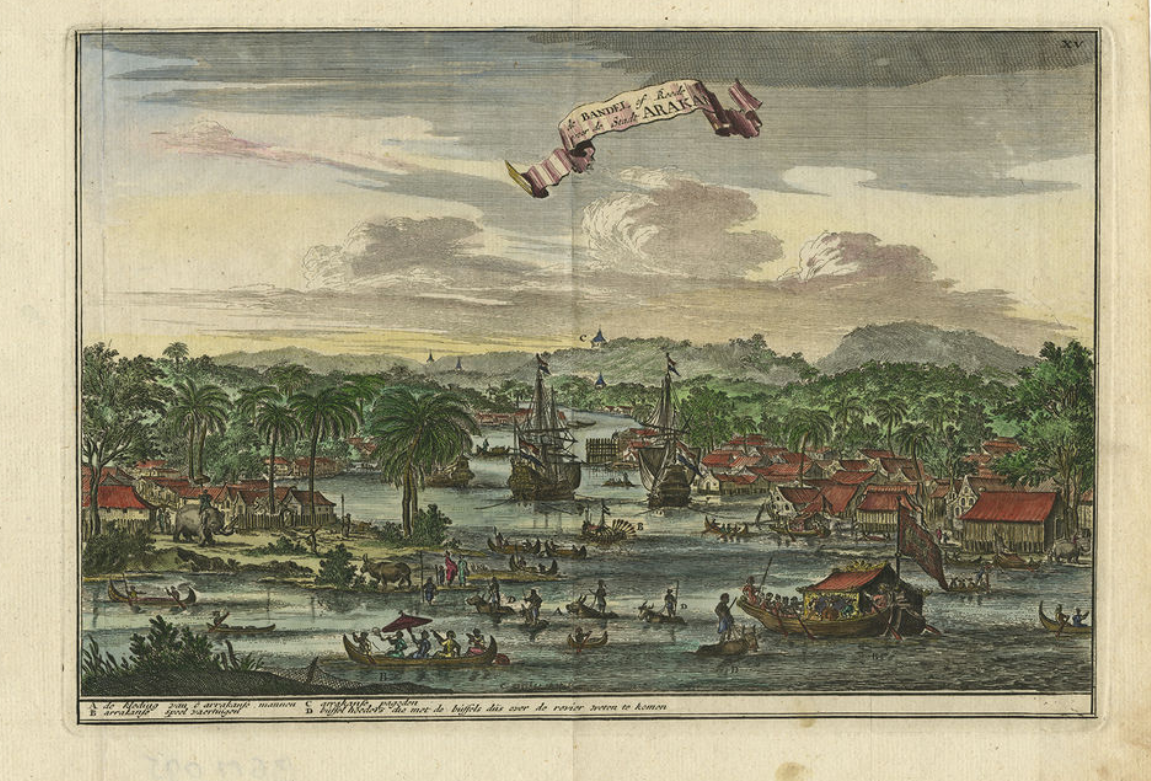
Boungdet Harbour and Trading Post of Arakan (Mrauk-U) in 17th Century

In 1660, Shah Shuja, the brother of Emperor Aurangzeb and a claimant of the Peacock Throne, received asylum in Mrauk U. Members of Shuja's entourage were recruited in the Arakanese army and court. They were kingmakers in Arakan until the Burmese conquest. Arakan suffered a major defeat to the forces of Mughal Bengal during the Battle of Chittagong in 1666, when Mrauk U lost control of southeast Bengal. The Mrauk U dynasty's reign continued until the 18th century.

Ruins of Mrauk U

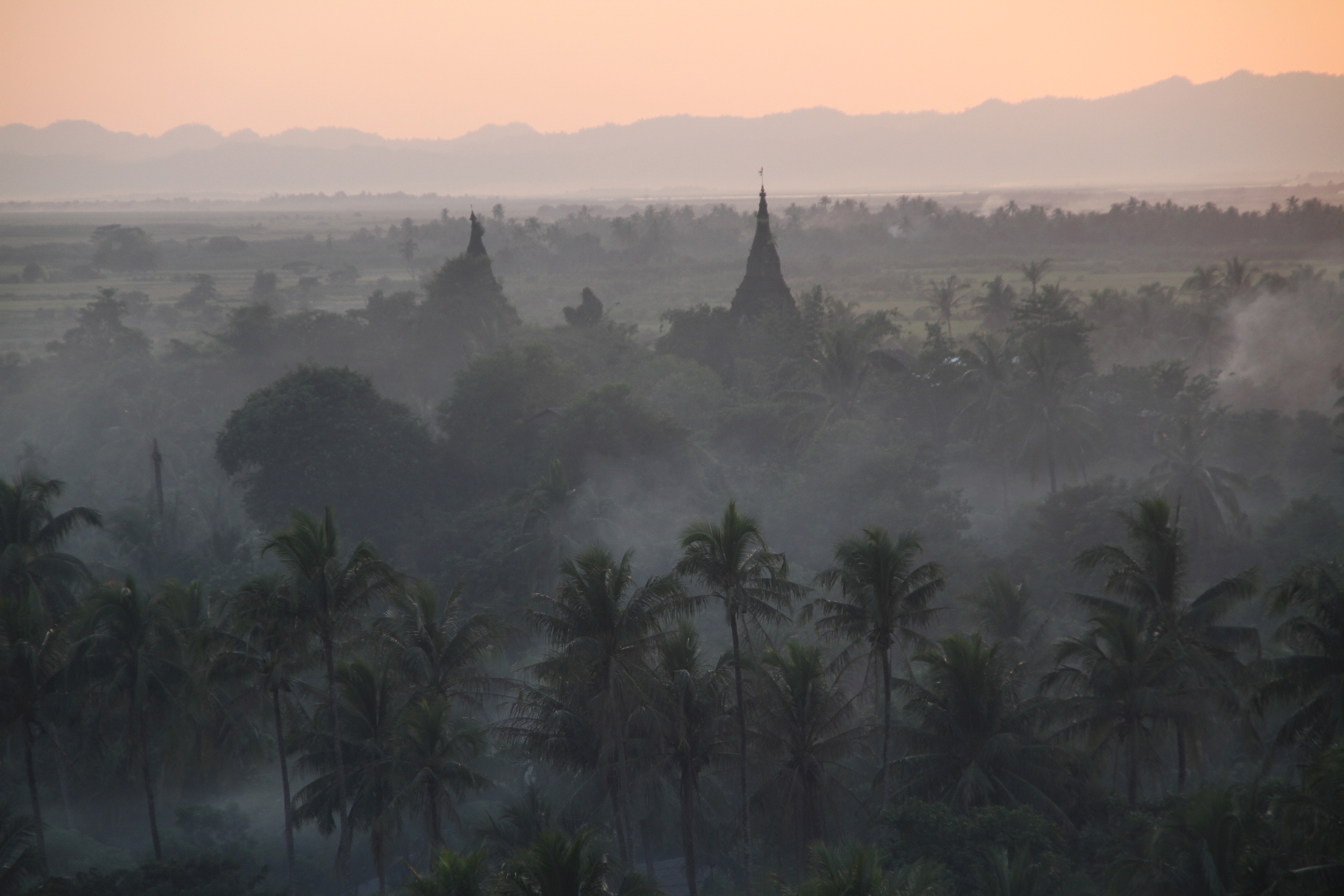
Skyline of Mrauk U

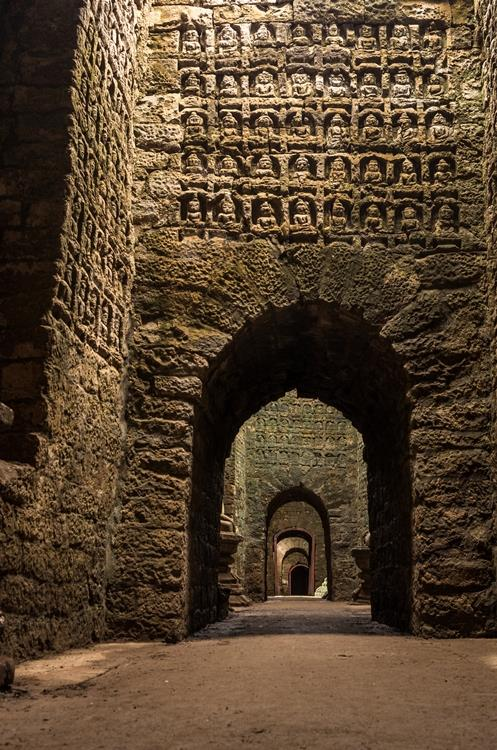
Koe-Thaung Gateway

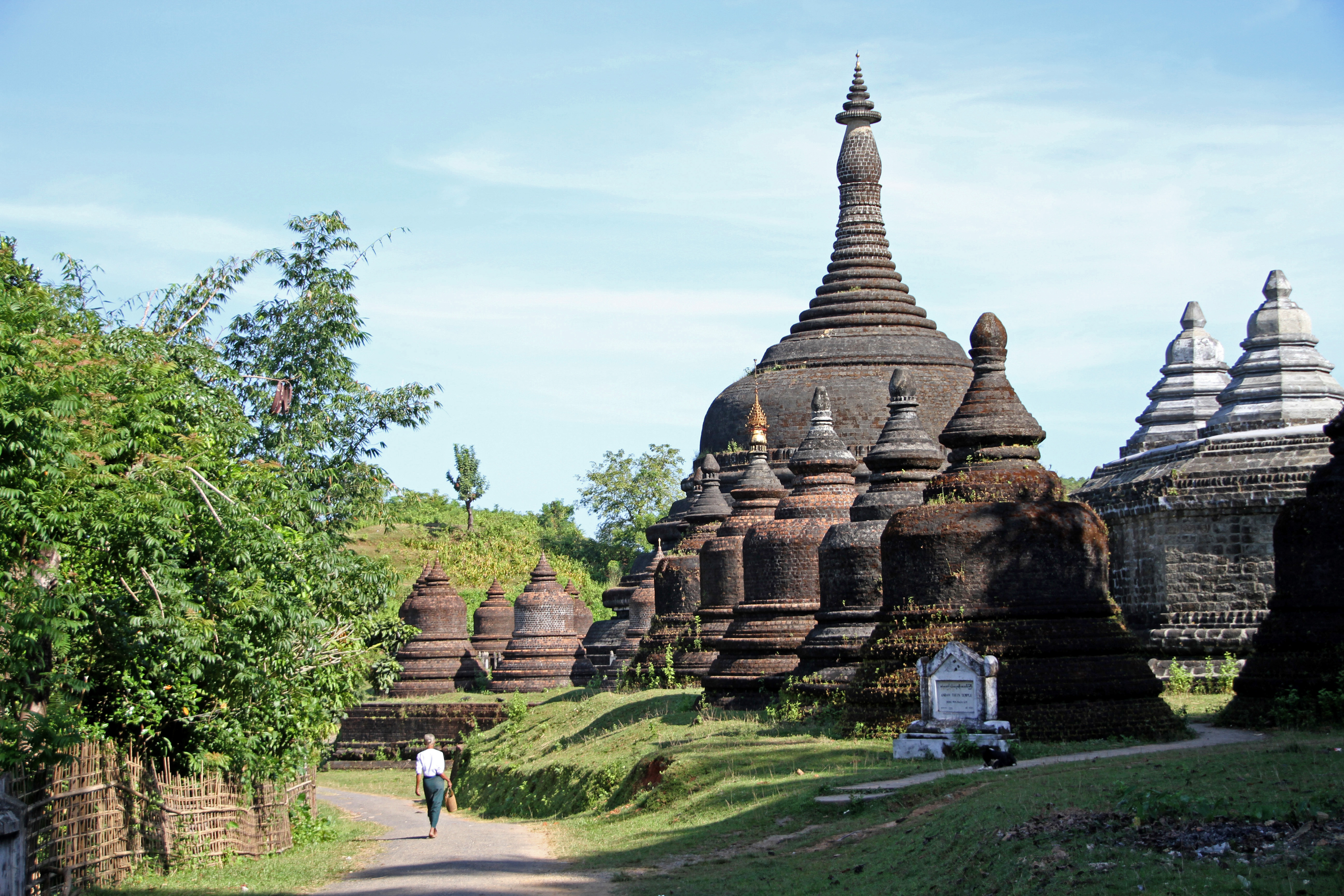
Ratanabon

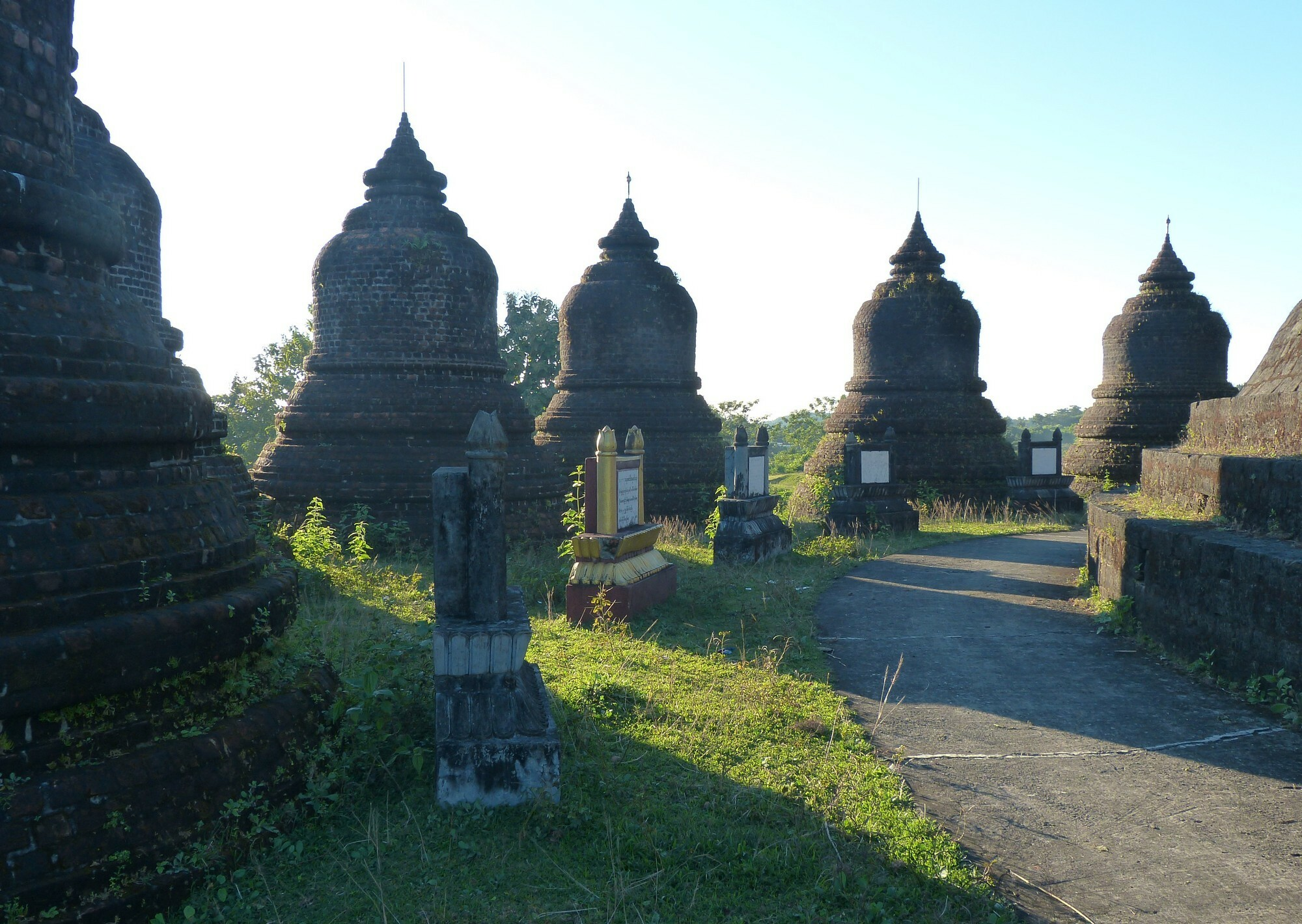
Pagodas in Mrauk U

=== Burmese conquest ===
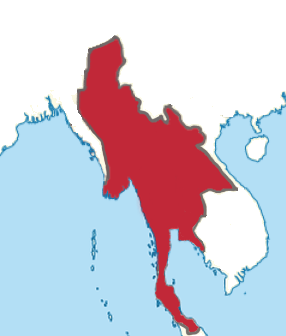
Arakan and the Burmese Empire in 1767

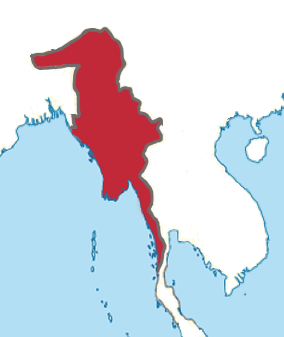
The Burmese Empire in 1824 covering Arakan

The Konbaung Dynasty conquered Arakan in 1784. Mrauk U was devastated during the invasion. The Burmese Empire executed thousands of men and deported a considerable portion of people from the Arakanese population to central Burma. The independence of Arakan ended in 1784 when Burmese forces conquered Mrauk-U. The Arakanese royal court was deported to central Burma. The religious relics of the kingdom, including the sacred Mahamuni sculpture of Buddha, were seized and transferred to Amarapura in Mandalay.

Rakhine rebellions were suppressed. Many Rakhine Buddhists fled by sea to the Barisal region of Bengal, where their descendants continue to live today. It is also likely that Arakanese Muslims became dispersed across Burma and Bengal as either deportees or refugees due to the conflict. Arakan experienced a demographic vacuum as a result of the Burmese conquest. There were several uprisings against Burmese rule, including a rebellion by Chin Bya in 1811. The uprisings caused recurrent Burmese raids into British India, which led to the First Anglo-Burmese War.

=== British Empire ===
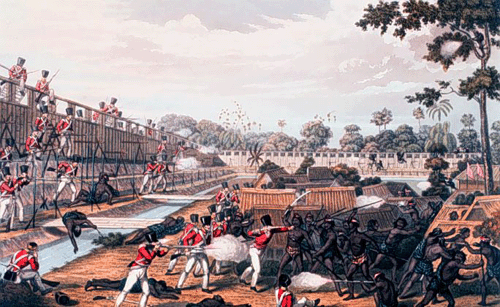
First Anglo-Burmese War

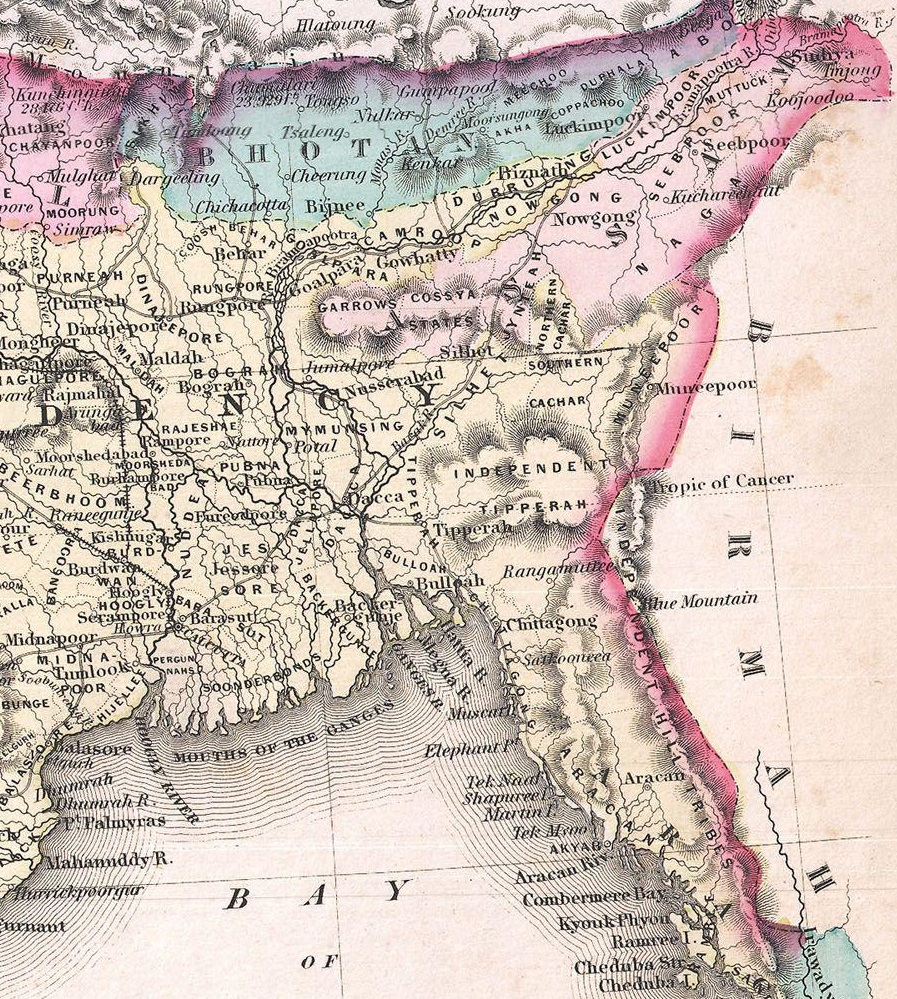
Arakan was incorporated into the Bengal Presidency after the British conquest in 1829

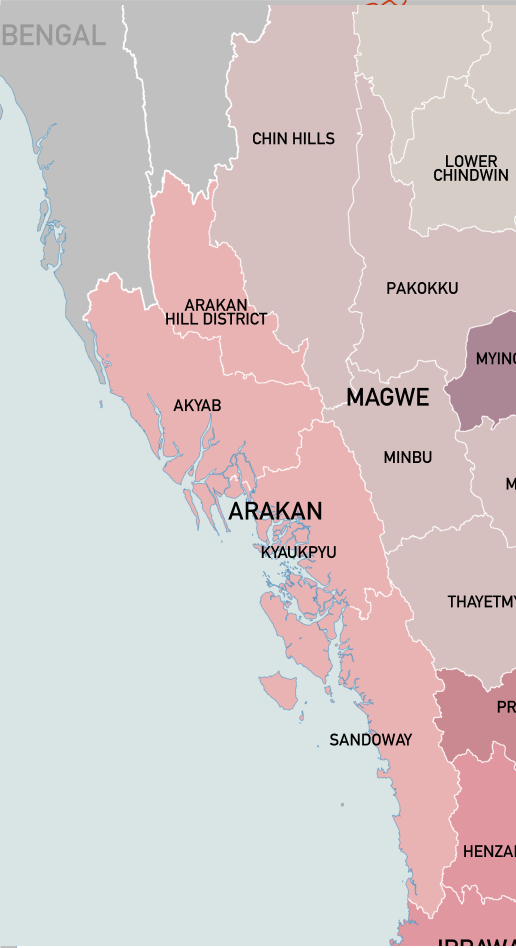
British Arakan Division in 1931

The Burmese Empire ceded Arakan to the British East India Company in the 1826 Treaty of Yandabo. Arakan became one of the divisions of British India. Initially governed as part of the Bengal Presidency, it received many settlers from neighboring Chittagong Division. The settlers became influential in commerce, agriculture and shipping.

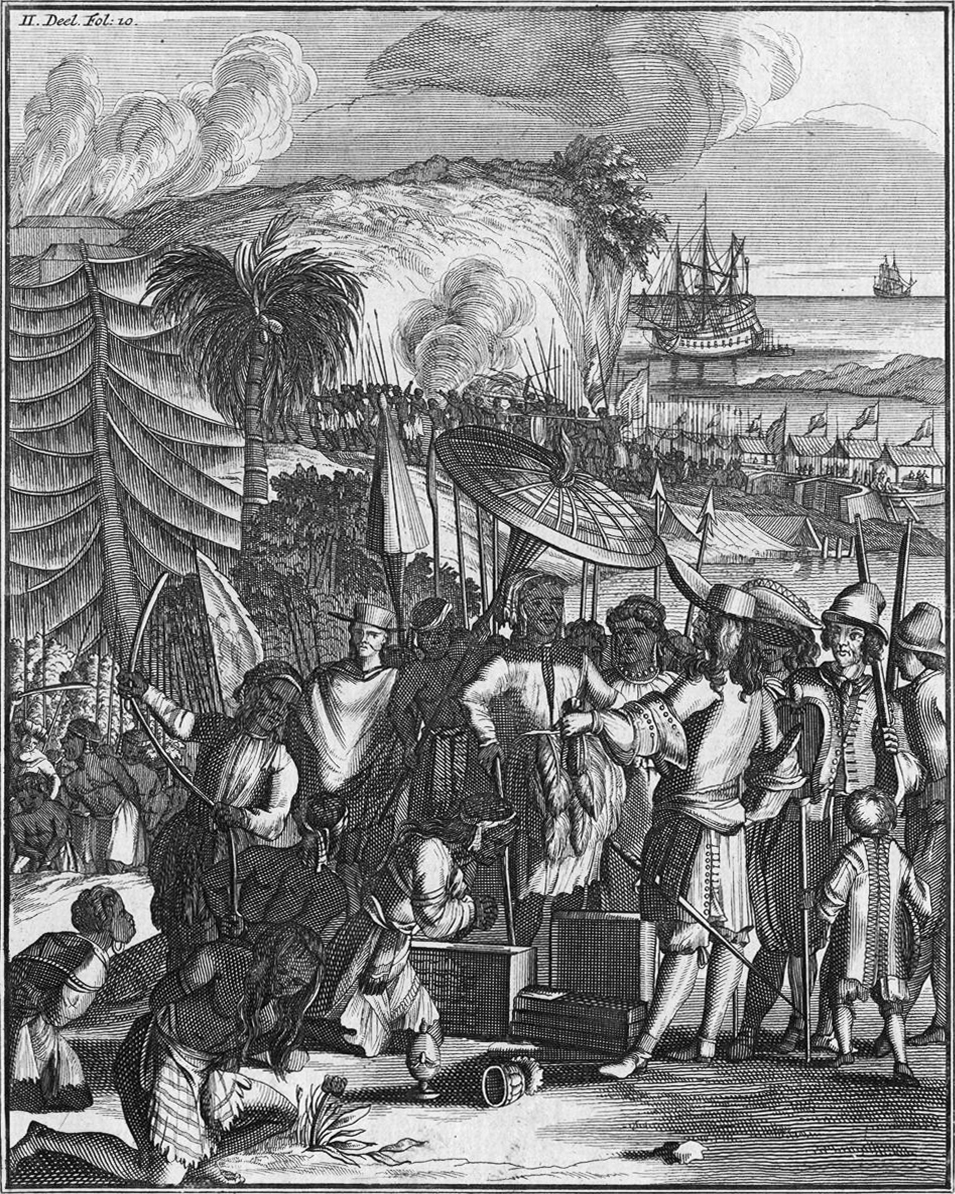
Natives of Arakan selling slaves to the Dutch East India Company, c.1663 CE

During British rule, Arakan Division was one of the largest rice exporters in the world. Arakan was the pioneer of the rice industry in British Burma. The emergence of Burma as a global rice exporter in the 20th century can be traced to Arakan. As one of the earliest regions to be conquered by the British, Arakan saw the removal of export restrictions imposed by the Burmese Empire. Rice was exproted to Bengal and beyond. Akyab (now Sittwe), the divisional capital of Arakan, was located in proximity to the Chittagong Division of British Bengal. In 1840, Akyab exported 74,500 tons of rice valued at an estimated 1.2 million rupees. In 1855, Akyab exported 162,000 tons of rice valued at an estimated 3 million rupees. The growth in rice exports was driven by the expansion of farmland – by clearing out jungles and cultivating paddy fields.

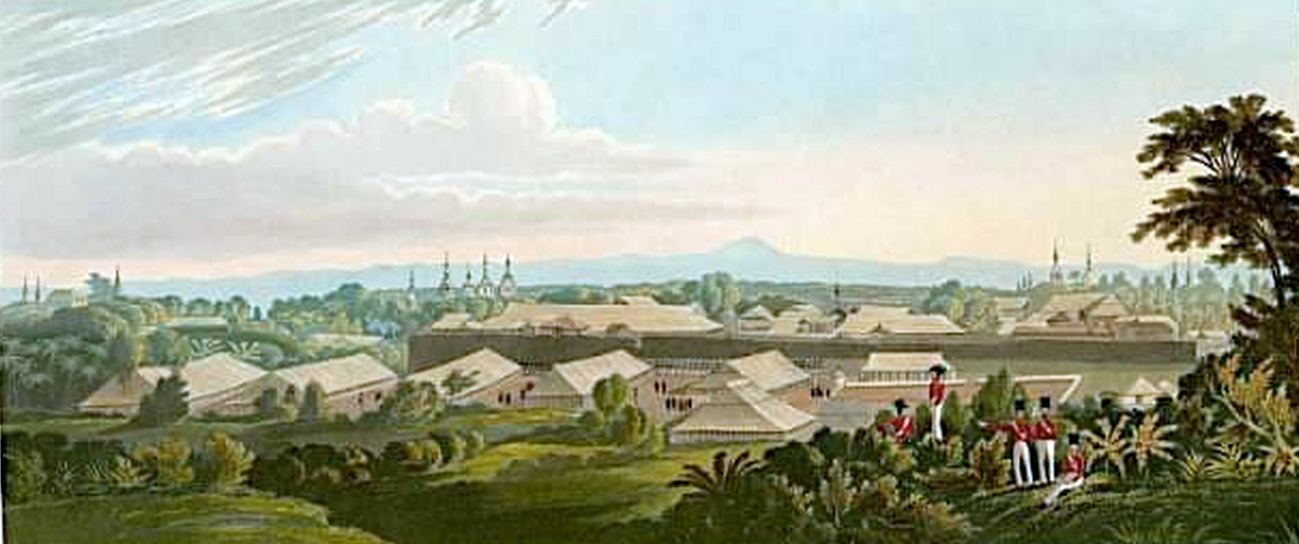
A very nice illustration of Mrauk U under British occupation in 1834. We are looking from the east, where the Pioneers (an engineer group) were camped. The walled palace at this time was still occupied by buildings.

Annual Average Exports of Rice from Burma to Europe
Period	In Thousands of Tons
1865 to 1870	308
1871 to 1875	484
1876 to 1880	557
1881 to 1885	707
1886 to 1890	657

Agriculturalists from Chittagong played an important role in the development of the rice economy in Arakan. When the British took control of Arakan, the borderland with Bengal was filled with dense vegetation. British objectives in Arakan centred on stimulating the rice economy. Transforming forests and barren land into paddy fields offered the potential of generating revenue by taxing rice farmers. The colonial economy in South and Southeast Asia depended on the taxation of farmers. Arakan neighboured the densely populated province of Bengal where demand for rice was high. Rice was a staple food of Bengal and demand for rice surged during periods of food shortages and famine. Arakan met this demand and profited from the rice trade. Akyab had shipping links with the ports of Bengal, including Calcutta, Chittagong, Narayanganj, Goalundo and Dacca. By the 20th century, Akyab enjoyed shipping links with Europe, Malaya, China, Ceylon and the Dutch East Indies. Arakanese rice was being exported to many parts of the world. The American Civil War disrupted the rice supply chain from the southern states of the United States of America. European traders and millers looked for an alternative location for rice imports. British Burma, with its expanding and low cost rice production, provided a lucrative alternative to the United States. The arrival of leading European banking and shipping companies in Burma propelled the rice trade into the single most important cash crop sector of the Burmese economy. In 1864, Liverpool imported an estimated 1000 tons of rice from Burma. The opening of the Suez Canal lowered the cost of shipping from Burma. European firms began to set up rice mills in Burma itself. Indian and Chinese merchants proliferated Burma’s ports. The rice economy supported the development of infrastructure, public services and other sectors of commerce. Rice from Lower Burma and Arakan became the backbone of the Burmese economy.

In 1869, Muslims constituted 12.24% of the population in Arakan. In 1931, they constituted 25.56%. In the divisional capital Akyab, the share of the Muslim population increased from 20.67% in 1869 to 38.41% in 1931. The British administration considered Chittagonian migration from Bengal as a key factor in the growth of the Muslim population. The colonial government encouraged Chittagonian migration as part of its policy to expand the rice economy in Arakan. The northern part of Arakan received the largest influx of settlers. The township of Naaf (now Maungdaw), which bordered Chittagong Division, became an extension of farmlands in Cox’s Bazar. The Naaf economy was essentially integrated with the greater Chittagong economy. Between the 1870s and 1880s, the Naaf experienced a surge in population growth due to immigration. Settlers included not only Muslims and Hindus from Chittagong; but also returning Buddhist refugees who were displaced by earlier wars. Muslims formed the overwhelming majority of settlers. This was complemented by the transformation of waste lands into rice fields. Settlers constituted 70% of Naaf’s population, owned 79% of cultivated land and held 84% of tax-paying landed property. Colonial census reports in 1921 and 1931 described Arakanese Muslims with various terms, including “Arakan Mahomedans”, “Chittagonian Mahomedans born in Burma”, “Chittagonian Mahomedans born outside of Burma”, “Bengali Mahomedans born in Burma”, “Bengali Mahomedans born outside of Burma”, “Indian Muslims” and “Indo-Burmans”. In 1937, Arakan became part of Burma Province, which was separated from India into a distinct crown colony.

==== World War II ====
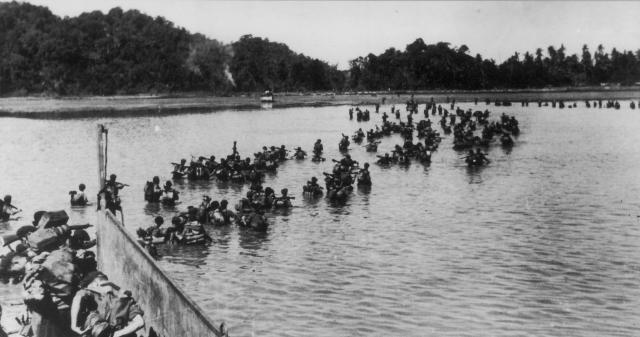
Allied forces crossing a river during the Third Arakan Campaign in 1945

During World War II, Arakan endured the Japanese occupation of Burma. The Burma National Army and the pro-British V Force were active in the region. Sectarian tensions flared during the Arakan massacres in 1942. Japanese rule ended with the successful Burma Campaign by Allied forces.

The division's seaport and capital Akyab were dominated by Arakanese Indians who were aligned with the British, which caused tension with Arakanese Burmese, many of whom were aligned with the Japanese. Both groups were represented as natives in the Legislative Council of Burma and the Legislature of Burma. In the 1940s, Arakanese Muslims appealed to Muhammad Ali Jinnah to incorporate the townships of the Mayu River valley into the Dominion of Pakistan.

=== Burmese independence ===
Arakan became one of the Union of Burma's divisions after independence from British rule. Burma was a parliamentary democracy until the 1962 Burmese coup d'état. The northern part of Arakan was governed by the central government in Rangoon in the early 1960s. Known as the Mayu Frontier District, it covered townships near the border with East Pakistan.

In 1982, the Burmese junta enacted the Burmese nationality law which did not recognize Arakanese Indians as one of Burma's ethnic groups, thereby stripping them of their citizenship. In 1989, the Burmese government altered the country's name from Burma to Myanmar. In the 1990s, the State Peace and Development Council changed the name of Arakan State to Rakhine State. The province was renamed after the Rakhine ethnic group. However, the new name is not accepted as legitimate by many in both the Rakhine and Rohingya communities, instead preferring the historical term Arakan.

Rakhine-led groups like the Arakan Liberation Army have sought independence for the region. Other groups, including the Arakan Rohingya National Organization, have demanded autonomy. The region witnessed military crackdowns during Operation King Dragon in 1978; in 1991 and 1992 after the 8888 uprising and 1990 Burmese general election; the 2012 Rakhine State riots, the 2015 Rohingya refugee crisis and Rohingya persecution in Myanmar (2016-present).

== Demographics ==
The people of Arakan have historically been called the Arakanese. The population predominantly consists of Tibeto-Burmans Rakhine Buddhists and significant population of Indo-Aryans Rohingya Muslims. Tibeto-Burman Arakanese speak the Arakanese language, also known as Rakhine which is closely related to Burmese. The Indo-Aryan Arakanese (Rohingya) speaks the Rohingya language which is closely related to Chittagonian language. Other languages spoken by smaller communities in Rakhine state include the Tibeto-Burman people of Chak, Asho Chin, Ekai, Kumi, Laitu, Mru, Songlai, Sumtu, Uppu and Chakma.

The government of Myanmar recognizes Tibeto-Burman Arakanese as the Rakhine people. It also recognizes sections of the Muslim community, including the Kamein. But Myanmar does not recognize the Rohingya.

Arakan Division had the largest percentage of Indians in British Burma.

== See also ==
- Military history of Arakan
- History of Southeast Asia
- History of Rakhine

== Sources ==
- Aye Chan (Autumn 2005). "The Development of a Muslim Enclave in Arakan (Rakhine) State of Burma (Myanmar)" (PDF). SOAS Bulletin of Burma Research. 3 (2). Archived from the original (PDF) on 12 July 2013.
- Yegar, Moshe (1972). Muslims of Burma (PDF). Wiesbaden: Verlag Otto Harrassowitz.
- Yegar, Moshe (2002). Between integration and secession: The Muslim communities of the Southern Philippines, Southern Thailand, and Western Burma / Myanmar. Lanham, MD: Lexington Books. ISBN 978-0-7391-0356-2.
