= Razathu I =

Razathu I of Launggyet ရာဇသူ ၁

King of Arakan
- Reign: 1256 - 1258 CE
- Predecessor: Alawmaphyu
- Successor: Saw Lu of Launggyet
- Born: 1232/33 CE; Nyeinzara Toungoo
- Died: 1258 CE (aged 25); Launggyet
- Consort: Saw Swe
- House: Alawmaphyu
- Father: Alawmaphyu
- Mother: Saw Shwe Thit
- Religion: Therevada Buddhism

Razathu (Rakhine: ရာဇသူ ;1232/1233 - 1258) was a second monarch of Launggyet Dynasty of Arakan. He reigned for 2 years and was succeeded by his son.

== Bibliography ==
- Sanda Linkara, Ashin (1931). Rakhine Razawin Thit (in Arakanese). Vol. 1–2 (1997-1999 ed.). Yangon: Tetlan Sarpay.
- U Uar Nha, Ashin (1930). Dhanyawaddy Razawin Thite (in Arakanese). Vol. 1 (2010s ed.). Rangoon: Rakhine Thagree Sarpay.
- Phayre, Sir Arthur (1917). Burma Gazetteer: Akyab District. Vol. A. Rangoon.

Preceded by Alawmaphyu	King of Arakan; 1256-1258	Succeeded by Saw Lu of Launggyet
