= Songlai language =

Kuki-Chin language spoken in Burma

Songlai
- Hio
- Region: Burma
- Native speakers: 7,300 (2012)
- Language family: Sino-Tibetan: (Tibeto-Burman); Kuki-Chin; Southern; Songlai

Language codes
- ISO 639-3: csj
- Glottolog: song1313

Songlai (Songlai Chin) is a Kuki-Chin language of Burma. It is 90% lexically similar to Laitu Chin, but not mutually intelligible. Dialects are Doitu, Hettui, Mang Um (Song), and Lai.

== Geographical distribution ==
Songlai is spoken along the Laymyo (Lemro) or Phunglaung river in the following townships of western Burma (Ethnologue).

- Paletwa township, Chin State (Mang Um, Doitu, and Hiattui dialects)
- Mrauk-U township, Rakhine State (Lai dialect)
