= Alawmaphyu =

King of Arakan

Alawmaphyu of Launggyet အလောမာဖြူမင်း

King of Arakan
- Reign: 1250 - 1256 CE
- Predecessor: Nganalon (new office)
- Successor: Razathu I
- Born: c. AD 1227; Nareinzara Toungoo
- Died: 1256 CE (age 29); Launggyet
- Burial: 1256; Nandawgôn
- Consort: Saw Shwe-Thit
- Issue: Razathu I Min Yin Khin; Saw Swe; Saw Thuza I
Regnal name
- Alawmaphyu
Posthumous name
- ဆင်ဖြူမင်းသား
- House: Launggyet
- Father: Nganalon
- Mother: Saw Shwe-Nan (စောရွှေနန်း)
- Religion: Therevada Buddhism

Alawmapru Min (Arakanese:အလောမာဖြူ); was the founder of the Launggyet Dynasty of Arakan, a former state in Myanmar (Burma), who reigned from 1250 to 1256.

== Early life ==
The future king was born to Prince Nganalon (ငနုလုံး) and Princess Saw Shwe Nan (စောရွှေနန်း) of Second Parein Dynasty in the year 1227 CE.

He was born with albinism which the chronicles reporting the baby prince look pure whitish skin and his hair all grayed.

== Reign ==
Death of Nganalon, his father and he succeeded him and was determined to moved the capital to Launggyet which was permanently established in 1251 CE (613 ME).

His queen was Saw Thit-Shwe (စောသစ်ရွှေ), he died after reigning for 6 years and succeeded by son, Razathugyi in 1256.

== Bibliography ==
- Harvey, G.E (1925). The History of Burma:From Earliest Time to March 1824. London: Longmans, Green and Co.
- Sandamala Linkara, Ashin (1931). Rakhine Razawin Kyan Thite (in Arakanese). Vol. 1–2 (1997-1999 ed.). Rangoon: Tetlan Sarpay.

Preceded by Nganalon	King of Arakan; 1250 - 1256	Succeeded by Razathu I
