= Sumtu language =

Kuki-Chin language spoken in Burma

Sumtu
- Region: Burma
- Native speakers: 14,000 (2007)
- Language family: Sino-Tibetan: (Tibeto-Burman); Kuki-Chin; Southern; Sumtu

Language codes
- ISO 639-3: csv
- Glottolog: sumt1234

Sumtu (Sumtu Chin) is a Kuki-Chin language spoken in Ann, Minbya, and Myebon townships in Rakhine State, Burma. It is partially intelligible with Laitu Chin, with which it shares 91 to 96% lexical similarity. Sumtu has 96%–97% lexical similarity with the Dalet Stream variety of Laitu Chin, and 84%–87% with Chinbon Chin.
