= Laitu language =

Kuki-Chin language spoken in Burma

Laitu
- Region: Burma
- Native speakers: around 15,000 (2007)
- Language family: Sino-Tibetan: (Tibeto-Burman); Kuki-Chin; Southern; Laitu

Language codes
- ISO 639-3: clj
- Glottolog: None

Laitu is a Kuki-Chin language of Burma. It is partially intelligible with Sumtu Chin. In Sittwe District, Rakhine State, Laitu is spoken in Minbya, and Myebon townships. Laitu has 91-96% lexical similarity with Sumtu Chin and Songlai Chin, 85-89% similarity with Chinbon Chin, and 82-84% lexical similarity with Asho.
