= Siege of Syriam (1607) =

- Part of Burmese–Portuguese conflicts
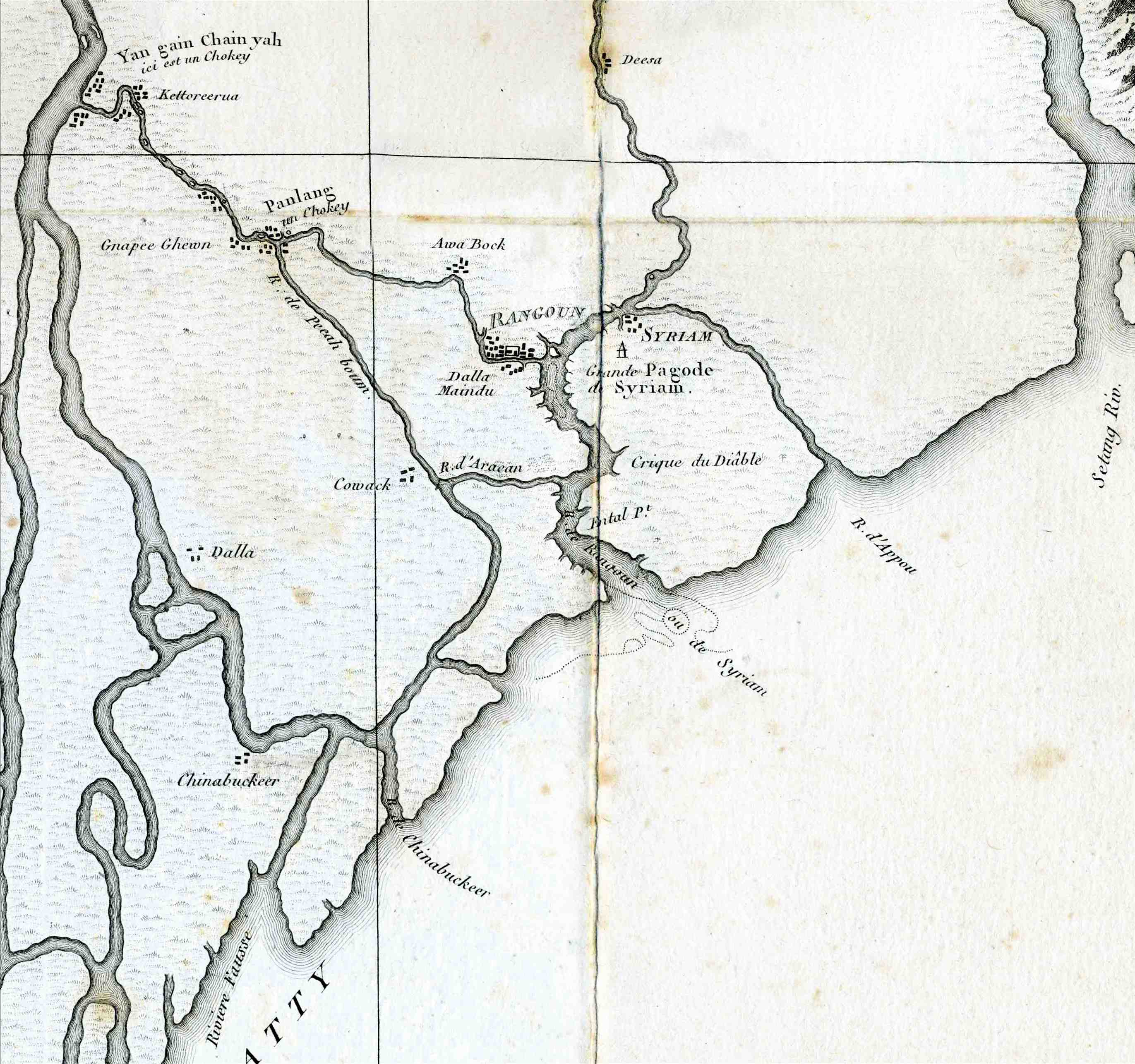
Date	March–10 May 1607
Location	Syriam, Pegu
Result	Portuguese victory
Territorial changes	Syriam recognized as an independent state; end of Arakanese control over the area

Belligerents
Portugal	Arakan; Toungoo

Commanders and leaders
Filipe de Brito; Paulo do Rego †	Min Razagyi; Natshinnaung

Strength
<200 Portuguese; 3,000 Mon	>10,000 Arakanese; 800–1,200 Arakanese ships 10,000 Toungoo

Casualties and losses
100 Portuguese killed Heavy Mon casualties	10,000 Arakanese killed 1,500 Toungoos killed

The Siege of Syriam (1607) was a military campaign fought between the Kingdom of Arakan and the Kingdom of Toungoo against the Portuguese forces of Filipe de Brito at Syriam. The siege ended on 10 May 1607 when Min Razagyi lifted the blockade and agreed to recognize Syriam as an independent kingdom.

== Background ==
After killing a son of Filipe de Brito and the other Portuguese and Christians in his kingdom, the king of Arakan, Min Razagyi, assembled a large fleet consisting of more than 800 oared ships, including galeotas and jaleas, as well as 3,500 artillery pieces. The fleet carried more than 10,000 men, including large numbers of musketeers and forces from Chocoria, an Arakanese dependency. The crews included mercenaries from diverse regions, among them Moors, Patans, Persians, and Malabars. Min Razagyi personally lead the fleet to Syriam, with the aim of destroying the fortress that Filipe de Brito had established there.

From this fortress, Brito controlled much of the maritime trade of the Kingdom of Siam and consequently practically dominated over the kingdom. To strengthen the campaign, Min Razagyi also allied himself with the king of Toungoo, whose army advanced simultaneously from the north.

Filipe de Brito assembled eight galiots and four sanguicels, manned by 240 Portuguese and many Mons, under the command of Paulo do Rego Pinheiro.

== Battle of Negrais ==
Before Min Razagyi's fleet could depart from Arakan, Paulo do Rego raided its coast, burning "every maritime town which he entered, and putting the inhabitants to the sword." He then withdrew to Negrais and waited for the Arakanese fleet to arrive.

When Min Razagyi's fleet arrived, the Arakanese positioned themselves close to the shore, among rocks and sandbanks. Several Arakanese supply ships subsequently approached the area without realizing that the main fleet was hiding, and the Portuguese attacked them. Captain Maruja, one of Min Razagyi's favorites, brought several jaleas out of concealment in an attempt to protect the supply ships, but was killed in action.

On 31 March 1607, Min Razagyi ordered a formal attack on the Portuguese. The battle was initially delayed by heavy rain, and the Arakanese fleet eventually engaged at 4 p.m. The Portuguese realized that their smaller force could not effectively confront the Arakanese in a conventional open battle. Therefore, Paulo do Rego used the size and maneuverability of his ships to penetrate the Arakanese, attacking ships as his fleet passed through it.

Paulo do Rego withdrew at 10 p.m., considering it imprudent to continue the engagement after nightfall.

The Battle of Negrais resulted in heavy losses for the Arakanese fleet. Several ships were sunk or burned, while the others ran aground. Min Razagyi's naval command also suffered near total devastation, resulting in the deaths of his chief admiral, the commander of his Islamic mercenaries, and many of his best captains. In total, 1,800 Arakanese naval personnel were killed, and another 2,000 were wounded.

== Siege of Syriam ==
=== Naval battle ===
Despite the losses, Min Razagyi remained determined to expel the Portuguese. Within six days, he had reassembled much of his fleet and repaired a portion of the damage sustained in the battle. He also persuaded the king of Toungoo to participate in a land campaign against Syriam. The king's son, Natshinnaung, led the army to besiege the fortress and blockade its port.

Upon receiving news of the approaching Arakanese fleet, Filipe de Brito assembled eighty ships, including galeotas, fustas, sanguiceis and jaleas. As usual, command was handed over to Paulo do Rego Pinheiro.

Min Razagyi's fleet was divided into four squadrons to attack the Portuguese naval force at the port.

The Portuguese fleet positioned itself at the same general location where, two years earlier, it had achieved a major victory over the king of Arakan's fleet. Paulo do Rego appears to have chosen a relatively confined location in the expectation that they would reduce the Portuguese disadvantage in numbers. Paulo do Rego was sent out with 80 ships to engage the Arakanese and Toungoo forces at Degu. The Arakanese fleet had already reached the area when he arrived, and his force became surrounded.

At the beginning of the battle, Paulo do Rego's galiot ran aground and was immediately boarded by numerous opposing ships. His ship had become lodged on submerged piles, preventing it from escaping, while Arakanese and Toungoos attacked it with grenades and containers of gunpowder. Because the ship also served as the magazine for the Portuguese fleet, it carried a large quantity of gunpowder. Rather than being captured, Paulo do Rego ordered the gunpowder to be ignited. The explosion killed Paulo do Rego, the Catholic priest Natal Salerno, and the remaining crew. It also destroyed the galiot and caused great damage and casualties on the Arakanese ships that had grappled with it. The loss of the flagship, however, had a considerable effect on the crews' morale.

=== Siege of Syriam ===
After the battle, the Portuguese fleet withdrew to Syriam for repairs. With the fortress effectively blockaded and the Portuguese fleet severely damaged, the Arakanese and Toungoos believed that the Portuguese position was close to collapse.

The garrison consisted of fewer than 200 Portuguese soldiers and 3,000 Mon defenders. Min Razagyi sent an envoy to invite Filipe de Brito to leave the fortress and negotiate personally, assuring that he would be treated well in consideration of the treatment previously given to Min Khamaung, who had been held prisoner by Brito. Min Khamaung himself encouraged Brito to accept the offer and offered to intercede on his behalf, but he rejected the proposal.

The Arakanese subsequently adopted a strategy of sustained attacks against the Portuguese fleet and fortress. After three more Portuguese ships were destroyed, Brito ordered the remaining ships to be hauled ashore and their crews added into the land forces defending Syriam. Meanwhile, Min Razagyi landed many of his soldiers while retaining his fleet for operations. The Arakanese and Toungoo land forces repeatedly attacked the fortress, while the Arakanese fleet bombarded the Portuguese positions. The fighting continued for a month.

After two months of siege, supplies inside Syriam had become scarce. Brito ordered the remaining provisions in Syriam to be brought together for a large feast held within sight of several Arakanese prisoners. The display was intended to give the impression that the defenders still could continue resisting for several months. Brito then released the prisoners and sent them to Min Razagyi with a letter.

The prisoners informed the king that the fortress could potentially withstand the siege for several more months. Min Razagyi consequently left the conduct of the siege to his subordinates and returned to Arakan for the rainy season, expecting Syriam to surrender to famine by the time he returned.

However, the king of Taungoo misunderstood Min Razagyi's intentions and believed that the Arakanese would leave the Toungoo forces alone to continue the siege. Following a feint against Syriam on 9 May 1607, the Toungoo army abandoned its camp and secretly withdrew home.

The Portuguese immediately occupied the abandoned camp and recovered food, artillery, and other supplies that the Toungoo army had been unable to carry away. Brito also saw an opportunity to attack the remaining Arakanese forces before they learned of their ally's withdrawal. Portuguese and Mon soldiers were sent out of Syriam along the river, accompanied by flags, fifes, and drums, while other forces advanced by the river. The Arakanese were left surprised both by the Portuguese sortie and by the absence of signals from the king of Toungoo.

On 10 May 1607, Min Razagyi decided to lift the blockade and negotiate with Filipe de Brito. During negotiations, Min Razagyi regarded Brito as his subordinate. This angered Brito, who insisted on being treated as an independent king. Min Razagyi and the king of Toungoo eventually agreed. For his part, Brito agreed to release Min Khamaung on the condition that Min Razagyi withdraw from Syriam, cease attacks, and pay the indemnity previously demanded by him.

Min Razagyi had agreed to consider Syriam an independent state, which marked the end of his control over this eastern section of his empire.

== Aftermath ==
The second siege of Syriam severely depleted the military strength of all major powers in Lower Burma. Min Razagyi returned home with only 262 ships from the initial 1,200, with an additional loss of 10,000 men. Toungoo lost 1,500 soldiers, six elephants, and forty horses. For the Portuguese, almost 100 were killed, including ten captains and admiral Paulo do Rego. A large number of Filipe de Brito's Mon allies died as well. The fortress of Syriam was left heavily damaged, with numerous houses and churches destroyed.

Nevertheless, this victory increased Filipe de Brito's influence in the region of the Bay of Bengal, becoming considered and treated as if he was the king of Siam.

== Bibliography ==
- Charney, Michael (January 1993). Arakan, Min Yazagyi, and the Portuguese: the relationship between the growth of Arakanese imperial power and Portuguese mercenaries on the fringe of mainland Southeast Asia 1517-1617 (Master's thesis). London: SOAS University of London.
