= Siege of Syriam (1613) =

- Part of Burmese–Portuguese conflicts
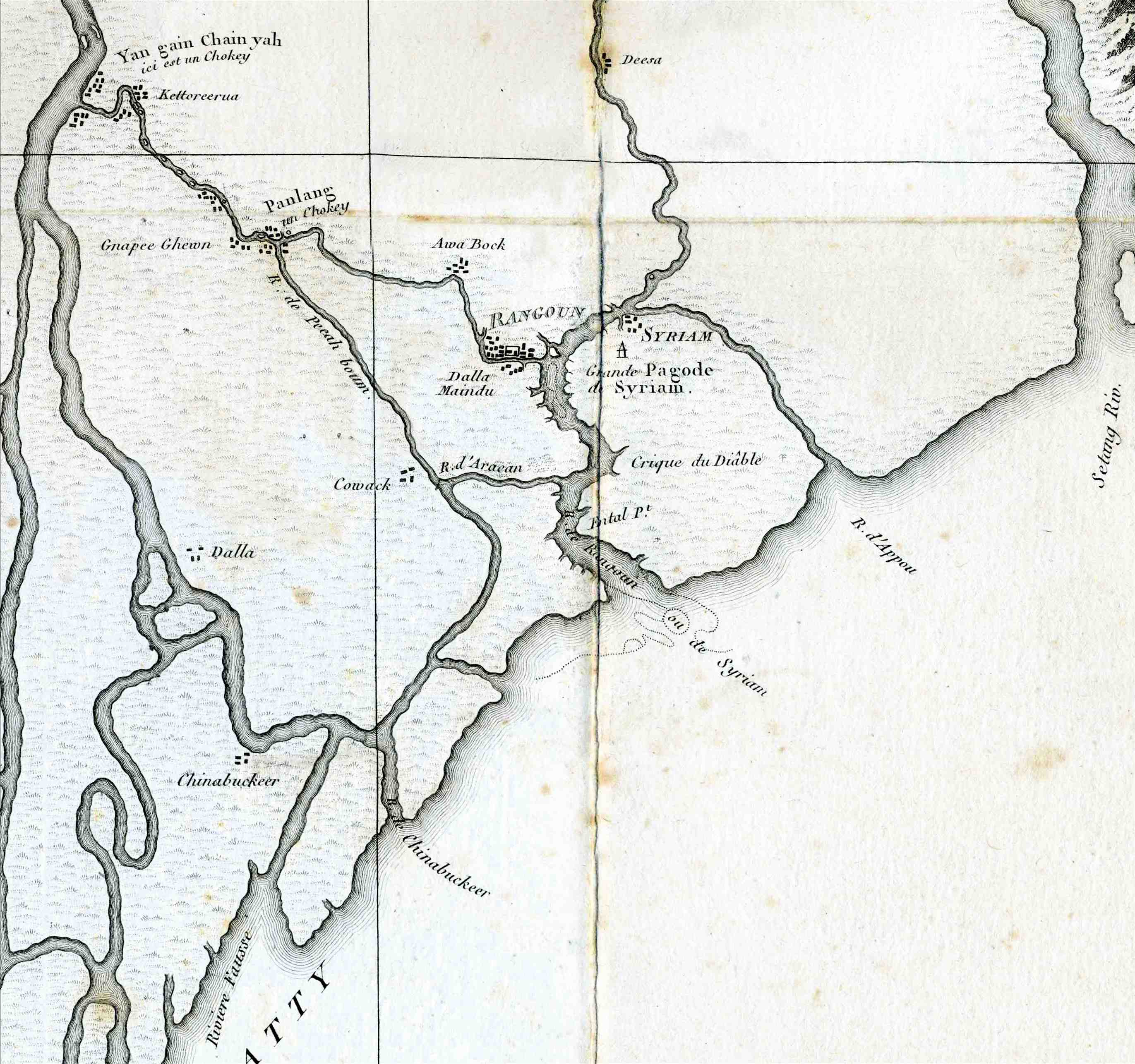
Date	19 February – 26 March 1613 (1 month and 1 week)
Location	Syriam, Pegu
Result	Ava victory
Territorial changes	Disestablishment of Portuguese Syriam

Belligerents
Portugal; Arakan	Ava

Commanders and leaders
Filipe de Brito (executed); Min Khamaung	Anaukpetlun

Strength
100–200 Portuguese; 2,000–3,000 Pegu; 3 Portuguese fustas 20 Portuguese jaleas 50 Arakan jaleas	120,000 men 6,000 Muslim mercenaries 400 vessels

Casualties and losses
50 Portuguese killed 1,000 Pegu killed 1 Portuguese fusta captured, 2 damaged 50 Arakan jaleas captured	30,000 killed

The Siege of Syriam (1613) was a 36-day siege of the Portuguese fortress of Syriam by the forces of the king of Ava. Despite heavy resistance by the Portuguese and Pegu garrison, the fortress fell, resulting in the capture or death of most of its defenders and the end of Portuguese control of the city.

== Background ==
Shortly after Filipe de Brito defeated the Arakanese fleet in 1607, the king of Ava, Anaukpetlun, then the most powerful ruler in Burma, advanced south with an army of more than 100,000 men. Taking advantage of the political disorder in Pegu, he conquered the kingdoms of Prome and Toungoo.

By then Filipe de Brito had risen to the rank of king and had arranged the marriage of one of his sons to a daughter of the king of Martaban. Seeing that Prome and Toungoo had been weakened by their war with Ava, and believing that the king was too distant to intervene, Brito persuaded his father-in-law to attack and seize their wealth, particularly their precious stones. The king of Toungoo was, however, an ally of Brito.

In late 1610, the armies of Syriam and Martaban used the Irrawaddy and Sittaung rivers to penetrate the territories of Prome and Toungoo. They successively attacked and plundered both cities and captured the king of Toungoo, who was taken prisoner to Syriam. As a result, the king of Ava prepared a large land and naval force, declaring his intention of eliminating the Portuguese from Syriam.

Anticipating the attack, Filipe de Brito sent a ship to Goa to request assistance from the viceroy of Portuguese India, Rui Lourenço de Távora. Three galiots were prepared, each carrying 30 soldiers, under the command of André Coelho. Coelho was ordered first to proceed to Pulicat and destroy a Dutch trading post that was being rebuilt there, and then to continue to Syriam.

The three galiots, however, were interrupted by a storm off the Coromandel Coast, forcing them to seek shelter on the island of Mannar. There, Coelho received orders from the new viceroy, Jerónimo de Azevedo, to leave the soldiers he was carrying in Ceylon and return with his ships to Goa.

Due to internal disputes, the garrison in Syriam was reduced to slightly more than 100–200 Portuguese and approximately 2,000–3,000 Pegu. Another problem was the shortage of gunpowder. During the attack on Toungoo, Brito had ordered large quantities of powder to be burned to make room aboard his ships for the goods taken during the plunder. Once the prospect of a siege became apparent, he sent a ship to Chittagong to purchase as much gunpowder as possible. However, the soldier entrusted with the mission disappeared after using the money provided for private commercial activities and never returned to Syriam.

== Siege ==
On 19 February 1613, the army and fleet of the king of Ava arrived at Syriam. The land force consisted approximately of 120,000 men, while the fleet consisted of around 400 vessels, accompanied with 6,000 Muslim mercenaries. The city was besieged both by land and surrounding rivers. Brito's fleet consisted of approximately three fustas and twenty jaleas, which were apparently kept ashore in a protected location.

A few days after the beginning of the siege, a Portuguese fusta arrived from Bengal. A large number of Ava's ships immediately attacked it and, after a brief fight, captured the ship. The Burmese thereby obtained a cannon, which they used to bombard the interior of the fortress.

Because Brito wished to preserve the remaining gunpowder for the firearms, he ordered his men not to use the cannons. Nevertheless, the defenders repelled repeated assaults using muskets and projectile weapons.

In the meantime, the Burmese constructed numerous mines, reportedly around 400, which ruined much of the fortress's walls and bastions that the Portuguese and Pegu repeatedly attempted to repair.

Approximately fifteen days after the siege began, Brito ordered his three fustas to make a sortie against the besieging fleet, with the intention to exploit a possible lack of personnel aboard Ava's vessels and set fire to as many as possible. However, as soon as the three Portuguese vessels entered the river, they were surrounded by a large number of well-manned ships and engaged in a desperate combat.

One of the fustas was boarded by numerous attackers and towed ashore, after which the crew resisted fiercely but was eventually killed. The other two vessels fired their cannons and firearms and avoided being boarded, inflicting several casualties on the opposing army. Outnumbered, however, they eventually withdrew to the fortress in miserable condition, with most of their crews wounded.

After another twenty days of siege, Brito saw that the position could no longer be saved and proposed surrender in exchange for the lives of the defenders, but the king of Ava rejected the proposal and again stated that he would not be satisfied until all the Portuguese at Syriam had been killed.

At this time, 50 jaleas arrived from Arakan in an attempt to relieve the fortress. Although an enemy of Brito, the king of Arakan, Min Khamaung, preferred Syriam to remain under Portuguese control rather than fall to Ava, whose growing power could pose a threat to his own kingdom. The relief fleet was nevertheless defeated by the larger Ava fleet, and all of its ships were seized.

The Portuguese continued to resist for another three days. On the third day, the Pegu defenders abandoned the walls, allowing Ava's soldiers to enter the fortress from several directions and overcome the remaining Portuguese resistance.

The siege had lasted 36 days. The attackers suffered approximately 30,000 deaths. The Portuguese lost around 50 men, while at least 1,000 Pegu were killed. 160 Portuguese, most of them wounded, as well as 22 white women and 5,000 Christian Pegu men, women, and children, were taken captive and sold as slaves.

Filipe de Brito was executed by impalement. His wife, Luísa de Saldanha, refused to become the concubine of the king of Ava and was subsequently subjected to mutilation of her thighs. Sebastião Rodrigues, described as a person of some importance, was imprisoned with a wooden yoke around his neck.

== Aftermath ==
The Portuguese viceroy dispatched Diogo de Mendoça Furtado with five galiots to relieve Syriam. When Furtado reached Martaban, he encountered a fleet of twenty vessels. After a short engagement, four of the vessels were captured. Those on board informed Furtado that Syriam had already fallen, and he consequently proceeded no further.

Regarding the king of Martaban, he was forced to surrender to Ava. King Anaukpetlun ordered him to execute Simão de Brito, the son of Filipe de Brito who had married a Martaban princess.

The fall of Syriam deprived the Portuguese of one of their most economically important strongholds in the region, which controlled access to one of the most wealthy areas of Southeast Asia.

== Bibliography ==
- Saturnino Monteiro, Armando da Silva (1994). Batalhas e Combates da Marinha Portuguesa – V (1604-1625) (in Portuguese). Lisbon: Livraria Sá da Costa.
- Danvers, Frederick (1894). The Portuguese In India. Vol. 2.
- Yimprasert, Suthachai (2004). "The Portuguese in Arakan in the Sixteenth and Seventeenth Centuries". Manusya, Journal of Humanities. 7 (2) 5.
- Charney, Michael (January 1993). Arakan, Min Yazagyi, and the Portuguese: the relationship between the growth of Arakanese imperial power and Portuguese mercenaries on the fringe of mainland Southeast Asia 1517-1617 (Master's thesis). London: SOAS University of London.
