= Mrauk U invasion of Pegu =

Siege of Lower Burma (1590s)

- Part of Burmese–Portuguese conflicts
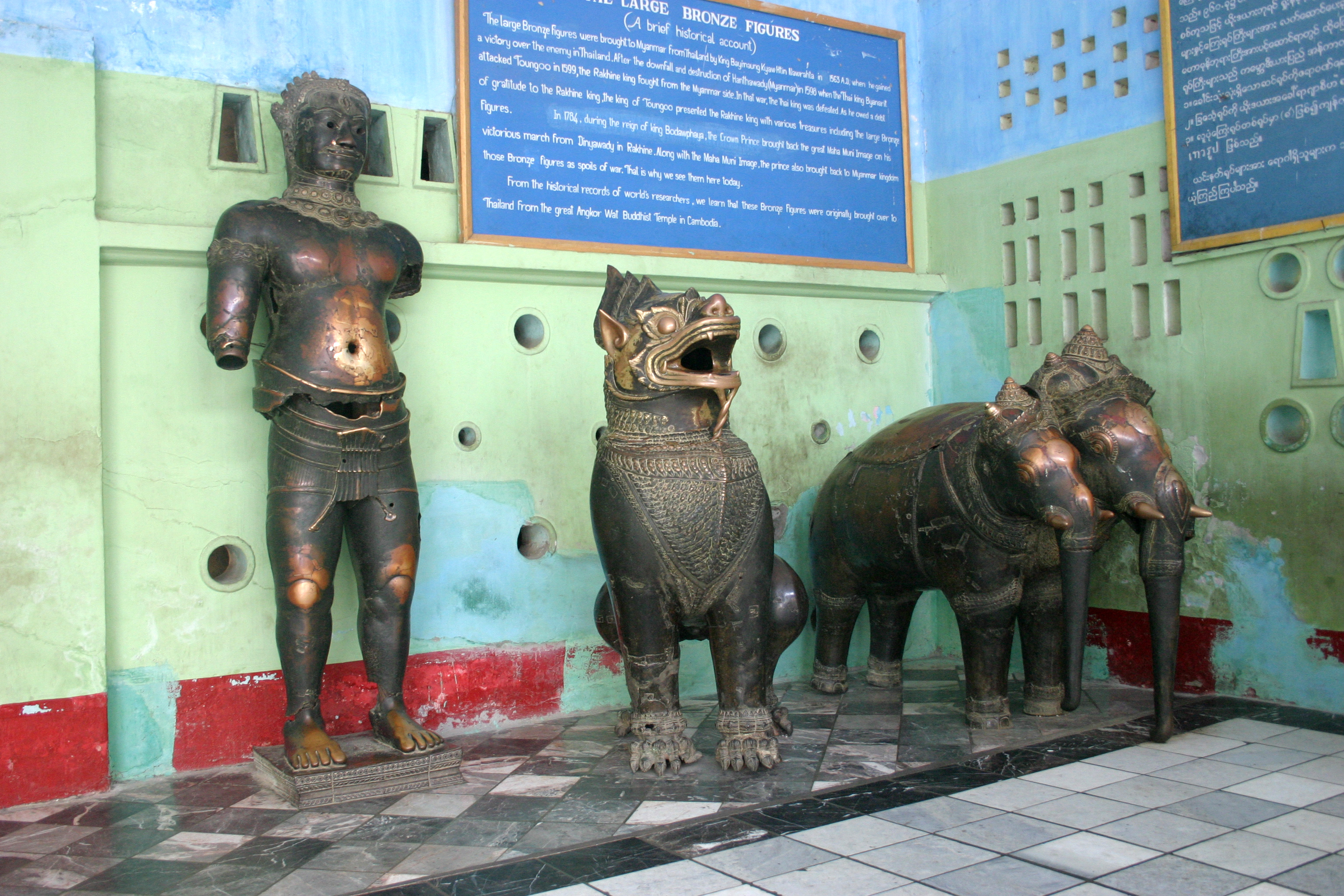
- Surviving Khmer bronze statue of the 30 statues taken from Ayutthaya in 1564, taken to Mrauk-U in 1600 by the Arakanese during the victory of battle in Pegu, and to Amarapura later in 1785 by Thado Minsaw.
Date	March 1598 – December 1599
Location	Arakan, Bago
Result	Arakanese victory
Territorial changes	Mrauk U seizes parts of Bago and Ayeyarwady into its territory

Belligerents
Kingdom of Mrauk U Burmese rebels	Toungoo Dynasty

Commanders and leaders
Min Razagyi; Minye Thihathu II; Filipe de Brito e Nicote	Nanda Bayin

Units involved
Royal Arakanese Army; Royal Arakanese Navy; Ketumadi Army; Portuguese mercenaries	Royal Toungoo Army; Royal Toungoo Navy

Strength
Total:100,000+ Left Flank: 30,000 royal guards troops Right Flank: 30,000 royal guards Elite Shock Troops: 20,000; Navy:300 war boats + 90,000 auxiliary boats	White Elephant Guards; 5,000+ including defectors from Pegu

In the late 16th century, King Nanda Bayin, the ruler of Toungoo, faced multiple insurgencies, notably from Minye Thihathu II of Toungoo and King Min Razagyi of Arakan (Mrauk U). Recognizing the weakened state of the empire, Min Razagyi allied with Minye Thihathu to capitalize on the situation.

== Background ==
Min Razagyi made Mrauk U into a prosperous and militarily strong kingdom, stretching from the Sundarbans in the northwest to Cape Negrais in the south. The kingdom's position grew even stronger the following year when the Toungoo Empire, which had previously attempted to conquer Mrauk U in 1545–1547 and 1580–1581, was on the verge of collapse. King Nanda of Pegu controlled only parts of Lower Burma and was facing widespread rebellions, including in Toungoo, the ancestral home of the dynasty.

Seeing this opportunity, Razagyi agreed to form an alliance with Minye Thihathu of Toungoo in 1597. Together, they planned a joint attack on the weakened remnants of the Toungoo Empire.

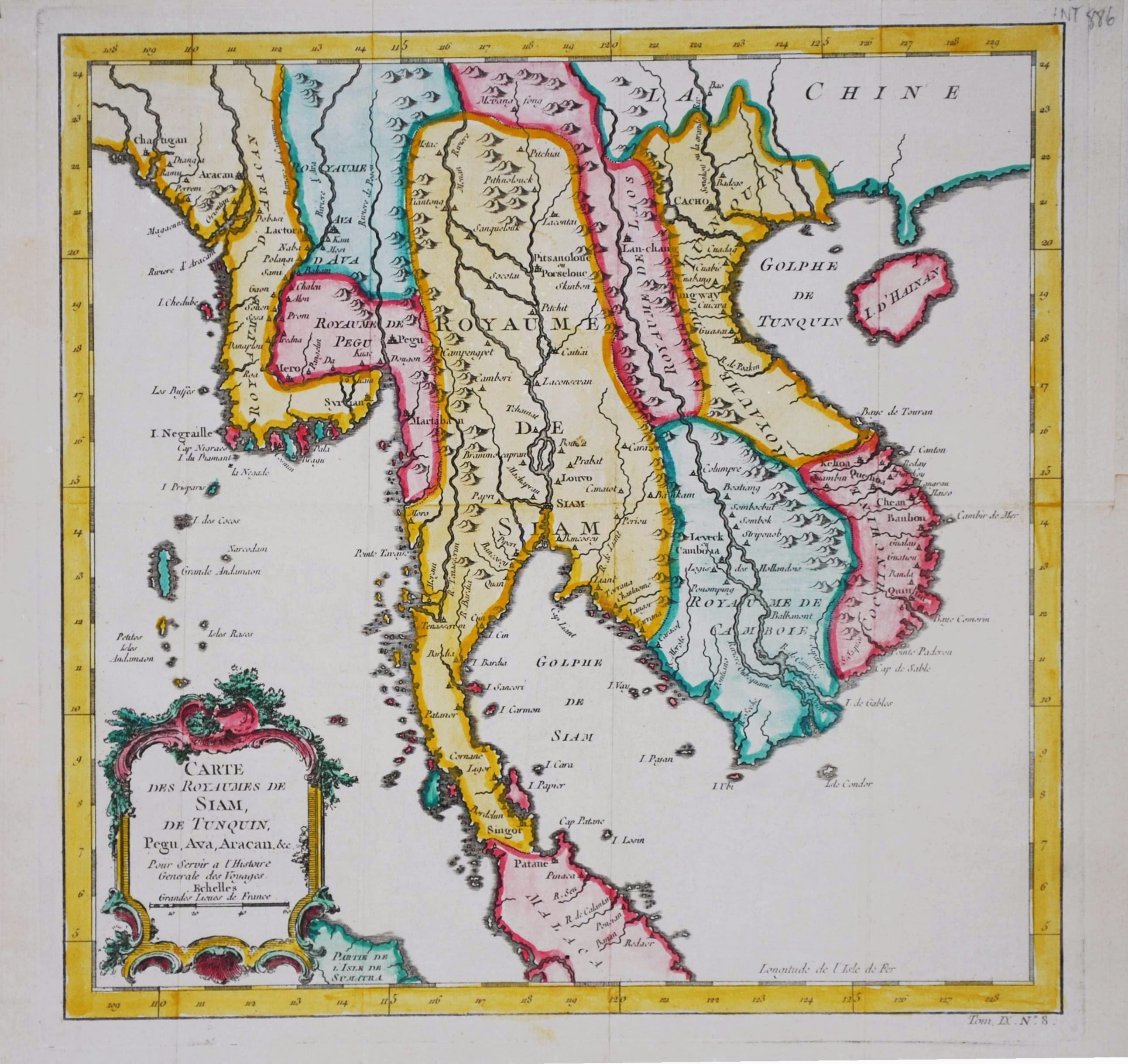
Kingdom of Arakan's during Min Razagi's Regin

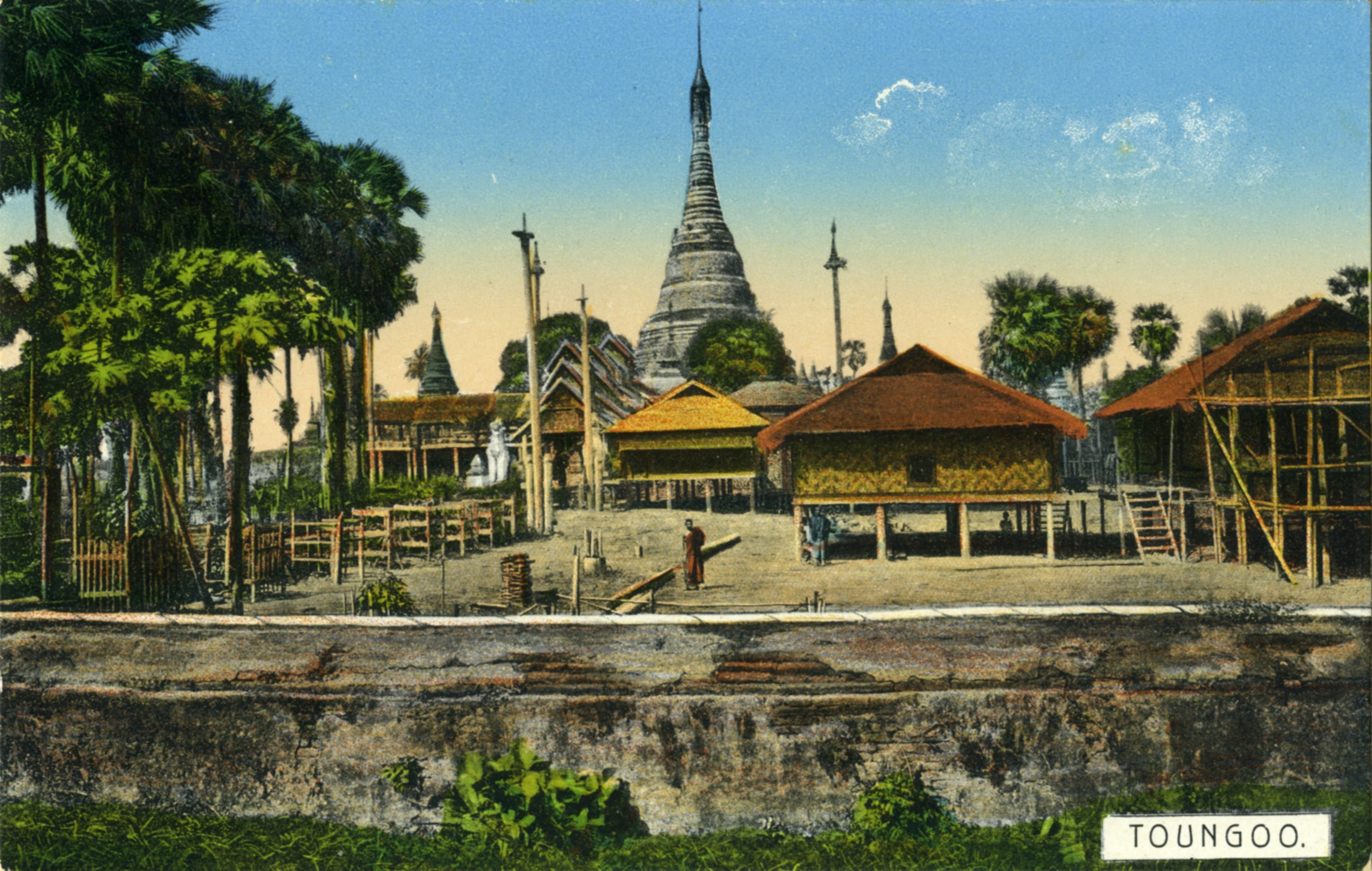
Old Toungoo

== Invasion ==
In October 1597, Min Razagyi's eldest son, the future King Min Khamaung, led an Arakanese fleet to Thanlyin (then an important fortress in the Irrawaddy delta, near modern-day Yangon). The city was taken without significant resistance.

By March 1598, Toungoo forces had set up a forward base in Kawliya, northeast of Pegu. During the dry season of 1599, both Arakanese and Toungoo forces invaded Lower Burma. The Arakanese navy, supported by Portuguese mercenaries, captured the key port of Syriam (Thanlyin) in March 1599.

In November 1598, Min Razagyi led a formidable force from Mrauk U, comprising approximately 30,000 troops, including a naval fleet of 300 war boats commanded by his eldest son and heir-apparent, Prince Khamaung.

The Rakhine strategy involved a naval blockade with 300 warships cutting off supply lines via the Gulf of Martaban. On land, Crown Prince Min Khamaung attacked from the south, while King Min Razagyi led the main army from the west. Bengali mercenaries, numbering 5,000, assaulted the eastern gates. A key event in the invasion was the defection of Prince Minye Kyawswa of Pegu to Taungoo, which weakened Pegu's defense.

This expedition also included Portuguese mercenaries under the leadership of Filipe de Brito e Nicote. By April, the combined Arakanese and Toungoo forces laid siege to Pegu (present-day Bago), the Toungoo capital. After enduring a protracted siege, King Nanda Bayin surrendered in December 1599.

== Aftermath ==
Following the city's capture, the victors divided Pegu's immense wealth, accumulated over six decades as the empire's capital. The Arakanese secured significant treasures, including gold, silver, precious stones, several bronze cannons, 30 Khmer bronze statues, and a revered white elephant. Additionally, Min Razagyi took Princess Khin Ma Hnaung, a daughter of Nanda Bayin, as his queen.

As war booty, Min Razagyi received several revered Buddha statues, the White Elephant (an important symbol of sovereign legitimacy), Nanda Bayin's third daughter, and two of his sons as hostages. These treasures were paraded in triumph in Mrauk U, the Arakanese capital. Historian Michael Charney has questioned Min Razagyi's direct presence at the fall of Pegu, suggesting he may have returned to the northwestern frontier during the final stages, leaving Min Khamaung in command.

The Arakanese forces stayed in Pegu for another month. King Razagyi lacked the manpower to control all of Lower Burma, but he aimed to weaken the region for the long term. His strategy was to destroy infrastructure, reduce the local population, and retain control over key strategic ports. To weaken the Toungoo further, the Arakanese deported 3,000 households to Arakan and razed Pegu, including the grand palace built by King Bayinnaung. They then retreated to Syriam, establishing a garrison to maintain their strategic presence.

== See also ==
- Sharing control of Lower Burma by Toungoo and Arakan
- Toungoo–Mrauk-U War
- 1605 Syriam battles
- Mrauk U invasion of Chittagong

== Sources ==
- Harvey, G.E (1925). The History of Burma:From Earliest Time to March 1824. London: Longmans, Green and Co.
- Htin Aung, Maung (1967). A History of Burma. New York and London: Cambridge University Press.
- Kala, U (2006) [1724]. Maha Yazawin (in Burmese). Vol. 1–3 (4th printing ed.). Yangon: Ya-Pyei Publishing.
- Sandamala Linkara, Ashin (1931). Rakhine Razawin Kyan Thite (in Arakanese). Vol. 1–2 (1997-1999 ed.). Rangoon: Tetlan Sarpay.
