= Salvador Ribeiro de Sousa =

17th-century Portuguese mercenary in Burma

- Born: 16th Century; Ronfe
- Died: 17th Century; Alenquer
- Citizenship: Portuguese
- Title: Commander of the Military Order of Christ

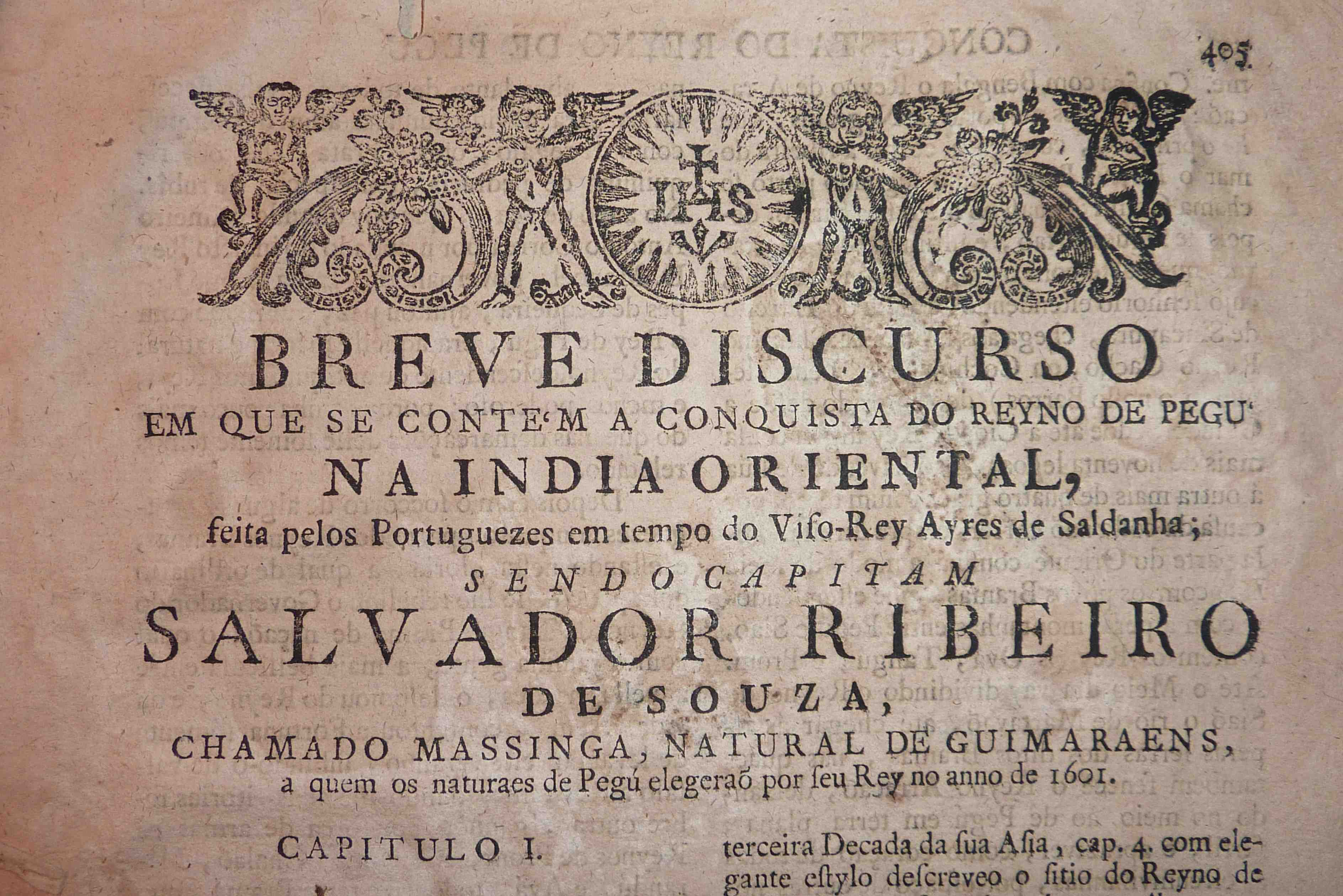
Brief Discourse, 1601, In Pilgrimage of Fernao Mendes Pinto, 1762.

Salvador Ribeiro de Sousa was an influential figure in the Early Modern Historical Period of Burma. He played a role in helping Filipe de Brito e Nicote, Nga Zinga, in defeating the Kingdoms of Arakan and Pegu, and in setting up a Pseudo-Portuguese Colony in the remnants of those kingdoms. He was awarded the Commander of the Military Order of Christ and was unofficially elected King of Pegu by the Burmese people. He also received the title "Quiay Massinga" (god on earth).

Much of what is written about him comes from Father Manuel de Abreu Mousinho, an unknown character, who originally wrote about Ribeiro in Castilian Spanish. His work was then translated by another unknown author into Portuguese under the title "Brief Discourse."

== Origin ==
Salvador Ribeiro de Sousa was the son of Frutoso Goncalves Cardote, and was born in Ronfe, Guimaraes, sometime in the 16th century then died in Alenquer in the 17th century. Ribeiro had at least two other brothers who died unmarried in India, there was also a woman named D. Maria da Mota e Sousa who was either his mother or wife. He would work as a Portuguese Captain, Soldier, Knight, and Mercenary and be awarded the Commander of the Military Order of Christ.

== India ==
On March 26, 1587, he left for India in Francisco de Melo's Armada as seen in Brief Discourse, of which, his story will be summarised.

There he served for seven years "in many honorable factions, such as of the ships of Mecca, and fought in a Naval Battle under Andre Furtado de Mendoca against three Meccan ships in August 1591.

He likely became the captain of Kunjali Marakkar's fort on the route of the Cultimuca Marca's Armada, on the Cardiva river.

Historian Diogo do Couto, described these two armadas, that Ribeiro was a part of, in his book "Da Asia". According to do Couto, "These two armadas were invested with equal value, but not with the same fortune; because after a very obstinate battle, Cutimuza left his entire Armada in the power of ours; and in order to save life, and freedom, he gave himself up to the waters of the river, and thus escaped by swimming."

And in Jaffna, Sri Lanka, he [Possibly Ribeiro], always proved to General Andre Furtado, to be a qualified soldier.

With these two victories, Furtado and his armada landed in the Port of Mannar, Sri Lanka. They continued their conquest of the island and returned to Goa "with spoils and covered with glory".

After that, Ribeiro served under General D. Jeronimo de Azevedo for six years and became a Captain of a company and assisted him in the famous retreat from Malvana (This could be referring to the Convention of Malvana in 1597)

The recorded events of D. Jeronimo and Do Couto in their respective accounts speak of someone named 'Salvador Pereira da Silva'. Could it be that this man was actually Ribeiro and that there had been a mistake in writing his name?

== Felipe de Brito e Nicote ==
In 1600, he decided to return to Portugal to request the rewards of his service, along with his two dead brothers, who had died in India. When he set for Goa from Ceylon, the weather forced him to the Gulf of Ganges in June of that same year. He then arrived at the Port of Syriam near Pegu and took it with 18 days having passed since the King of Pegu joined Toungoo.

According to Father Manuel de Abreu Mousinho, Ribeiro commanded the troops of Arakan together with Filipe de Brito e Nicote, who was also another Portuguese Mercenary living there at the time. When the Portuguese received the license to make a Customs House in Syriam, near the Mouth of the Irrawaddy River, Burma, Ribeiro or an "infidel" and ambitious friend of Filipe intervened and built a fortress for the Portuguese Indian Colony.

The King Xilimixa, of Arakan, attacked the fort and was defeated by Ribeiro and Filipe. Xilimixa lost around 1000 boats and 40,000 men. The surrounding people of Pegu and Burma heard about this great feat and started to see the victors as heroes.

However, Filipe would soon lose favor in the eyes of the Peguans as he started to convert the local population and destroyed artefacts. Ribeiro would not experience this and would continue to become known as "Quiay Massinga" (god on earth), by the locals.

This section is from Frederick Charles Danvers' Book 'The Portuguese in India: Being a History of the Rise and Decline of Their Eastern Empire'. There are some interjections and questions added as well.

"It was during the government of Viceroy Aires de Saldanha that the Portuguese achieved their first position in Arakan. It was due to Salvador Ribeiro de Sousa, who was one of the many Portuguese soldiers of fortune who, at the beginning of the 17th century, had the custom of offering his services to the kings of the small states into which Indochina was divided. Born in Guimarães, he went to Arakan at the end of the 16th century, where he obtained the captaincy of a native regiment. Filipe de Brito e Nicote was born in Lisbon, to a French father - a man as ambitious as Sousa was disinterested. Xilimixa [also known as Salim Shah or Min Razagyi in Burmese], King of Arakan, having seized Pegu for himself expressed his gratitude to the Portuguese who had assisted him, he gave them the port of Syriam (or Thanlyin), a village in the district of Rangoon, on the left side of the Pegu River (today the Irrawaddy River), nearly three miles from its mouth). Nicote [called Nga Zingar in Burmese] later managed to convince Xilimixa to build a customs house at the mouth of the river, openly to increase his income through this, but with the true intention of making use of it when completed, and to convert it into a fortress that could serve as a base of operations for the Portuguese in the conquest of the entire monarchy. As soon as the work was finished, the king placed him in charge of Banadala, who, suspecting Nicote's designs, fortified the place and did not allow any Portuguese to enter with the exception of a Dominican friar, called Belchior da Luz. Nicote, who was thus confused in his first intentions, decided to take possession of the place by force, before the defense work was almost completed. for this purpose, he with three officers (João de Oliva, Paulo do Rego, and Salvador Ribeiro), with fifty men, made a sudden attack on the fort. Banadala took refuge on a neighboring island, where he fortified himself. Afterwards he gathered a force of a thousand men, and took the treasures that belonged to Dagon Pagoda for safekeeping.

The king, as soon as he heard of this proceeding, determined to send immediate relief to Bannya dala; but Nicote, who seems to have gained extraordinary influence over Xilimixa, dissuaded him from doing anything similar, for the reason that Bannya dala was a sacrilegious thief, and offered his own services to settle matters with the Portuguese. To this the King readily agreed, and soon after Nicote gave the necessary orders to complete the fortification work in the so-called Customs House, under his own directives, and by his own Portuguese men.

As soon as the work was sufficiently advanced, Nicote returned to Goa, intending to offer the fort to the Viceroy, leaving Salvador in charge of the square. At the same time, he persuaded the king that his expedition had the objective of obtaining help for the conquest of Bengal. But before departing, Nicote entered into communication with several neighboring Princes, proposing to each of them separately that, if he would join with the viceroy in the projected conquest, he might easily become King of Pegu, and some of them were sufficiently persuaded to send ambassadors to the viceroy on that objective.

As soon as Nicote had left, the king learned of his intrigues, and full of indignation he immediately ordered that all the Portuguese be expelled from his kingdom. To this end he sent Bannya dala down the river with a fleet and 6000 men. These were found by three ships with only thirty Portuguese, commanded by Salvador Ribeiro, who, in a short space of time, and without losing a man, killed several enemies, captured forty boats, and put the rest to flight.

Salim Shah then obtained assistance from the king of Prome, and a combined force of 1,200 sail attacked the place by water, while 40,000 men attacked by land. Salvador Ribeiro, with a handful of his compatriots, retreated to the fortress, which they defended heroically. Seeing that the enemy did not observe any particular order in the attack, Ribeiro made a sudden attack one night, and falling energetically upon them, killed their general and put the entire army to flight.

Bannya dala shortly afterward again besieged the fort, with an army of 8,000 men, and, having planted his guns, bombarded the place for a whole day, and in the middle of the night advanced with his men calmly, and made an assault. This attack was resisted with so much vigor that the assailants were repulsed, and 1,000 dead bodies of the enemy were found in the ditch the next morning. The enemy continued the siege for eight months. Some of the Portuguese garrison deserted, but, to prevent others from following the same example, Ribeiro had all the boats in the port burned.

As soon as the viceroy learned of what had happened in Syria, he sent reinforcements, with the arrival of which Ribeiro found himself at the head of 800 men, with whom he determined to take up the offensive. Having made all necessary plans for this purpose, he unexpectedly fell into the buildings of the enemy, who resisted with great courage, but after an obstinate fight, the Portuguese troops were again victorious, and the army of Bannya dala was forced to flee. Ribeiro then destroyed all the works that had been built for the attack.

The fort now relieved of the enemy's presence, Ribeiro allowed the majority of his troops to disperse for some time, keeping only 200 inside the fortress. While the Portuguese were thus scattered, Bannya dala returned to the siege, bringing some movement castles and various types of bombards. The defenders were reduced to great extremities, and the issue du combat became extremely doubtful, when a fiery meteor appeared in the skies, frightening the besiegers who fled, leaving all their castles behind, and these were quickly destroyed by the Portuguese.

In addition to this success, Ribeiro also won a victory over King Massinga [This could be referring to Xilimixa or a different king since Ribeiro was already known as Massinga], in the province of Camelan (Kamanlay?), in which the king was killed, and great damage done to his country, both by land and sea. Due to these victories the reputation of the Portuguese was made great with the people of Pegu, who quickly wanted to be employed by them, until within a short time they were able to receive the services of 20,000 natives. These, in consideration of the success achieved by Filipe de Brito e Nicote, and his good temperament (because of which they called him "Changa", or "Good Man"), proclaimed him king. As he was still absent, Salvador accepted the crown in his name, but as soon as he returned Nicote received the kingdom in the name of the king of Spain and Portugal. Command of the Siriam fort now fell to Rodrigo Álvares de Sequeira, who accidentally burned it, leaving only the walls standing.

Nicote appears to have had as much success with the Viceroy as he had had with Xilimixa, and to have exerted a powerful influence on him, for he not only accepted Nicote's every demand, but married him to a niece of his who had been born in Goa of a Javanese woman. He also granted him the title of "Commander of Siriam, and General of the Conquests of Pegu". Nicote then returned to Syria with reinforcements, and six ships. Having reached Syria he rejoined the fort, built a church, and sent a rich gift to the King of Arakan, who had sent him a delegation to congratulate him on his arrival. He then issued orders as to the customs house, in accordance with the instructions he had received from the Viceroy, all ships trading on the coast of Pegu were to make their entries there. As certain ships on the Coromandel coast refused to obey these orders, Nicote sent Dom Francisco de Moura with six ships to force obedience. This was accomplished efficiently, and, in addition, two boats belonging to Achin were captured, with a rich cargo on board.

Seeing the use that was made of the Customs House in Siriam, the King of Arakan wished to take possession of that place and its revenues, and induced the king of Taungoo to join the company. This coming to Nicote's knowledge, he sent Bartolomeu Ferreira, captain of the small ships, to attack twenty small "jalias" that had been prepared for this purpose. He easily defeated them and put them to flight, thus escaping the king of the country of Jangona. The enemy, exasperated by their defeat, gathered 700 small ships with 4,000 men, which were placed under the orders of the prince's son, and with him went Ximicolia and Marquetam, sons of the emperor of Pegu.

Paulo do Rego Pinheiro [This person is an unknown character] was sent against these forces with boats and seven ships, and having captured ten boats that were in front of the rest of the armada, he returned to deposit them in a safe place and then left again. Finding the enemy too strong for him, he obtained reinforcements, with which he attacked and defeated the enemy, capturing several ships. The prince, in his effort to escape, headed towards a stream, where Pinheiro captured the rest of his fleet, and the Prince fled overland, having lost 1,000 of his men. Pinheiro then captured the Fort of Chinim, and took many prisoners there, among whom was Bannya dala's wife.

After this success Nicote took to the sea with fourteen small ships, in which sixty Portuguese and 200 natives of Pegu were traveling; he headed over a river, and hearing that the Prince went ashore with 4,000 men, 900 of whom were musketeers, he determined to attack them. The Prince's troops were defeated and he himself was arrested, as a result of which 2,000 men were sent to his aid by the King of Prome, but these too suffered a disastrous defeat, and were forced to withdraw. After this Nicote was allowed for some time to keep his rule of Syria in Peace.

Having handed over the government of Siriam to Nicote, Salvador Ribeiro de Sousa retired to Portugal, where he is supposed to have spent the rest of his days in his native village, in the province of Minho. His body lies in the chapter house of a small Franciscan convent near Alenquer, approximately thirty miles from Lisbon, where an inscription evokes his name and his story. Portuguese writers call him the Marcus Aurelius of India's Decadence, and more than one poet has sung his praises."

== Bibliography ==
- Frederick Charles Danvers: The Portuguese in India: Being a History of the Rise and Decline of Their Eastern Empire.
- Father Manuel de Abreu Mousinho: Brief speech in which the conquest of the kingdom of Pegu in Eastern India is heated, achieved by the Portuguese since the year 1000 and six years until 603?, being captain Salvador Ribero de Sousa, born in Guimarães, five natives of Pegu were elected by their King. In Lisbon. By Pedro Craesbeeck, 1617.
- Anonymous (Portuguese translation of Father Manuel's book): Brief speech containing the conquest of the Reyno de Pegu in Eastern India, by the Portuguese during the time of Viceroy Ayres de Saldanha; the captain being Salvador Ribeiro de Souza, called Massinga, a native of Guimaraens, whom the natives of Pegú elected as their King in the year 1601. In Fernão Mendes Pinto: Pilgrimage, Lisbon 1711 and 1762.
