= 1605 Syriam battles =

Series of battles in Lower Myanmar

- Part of Burmese–Portuguese conflicts
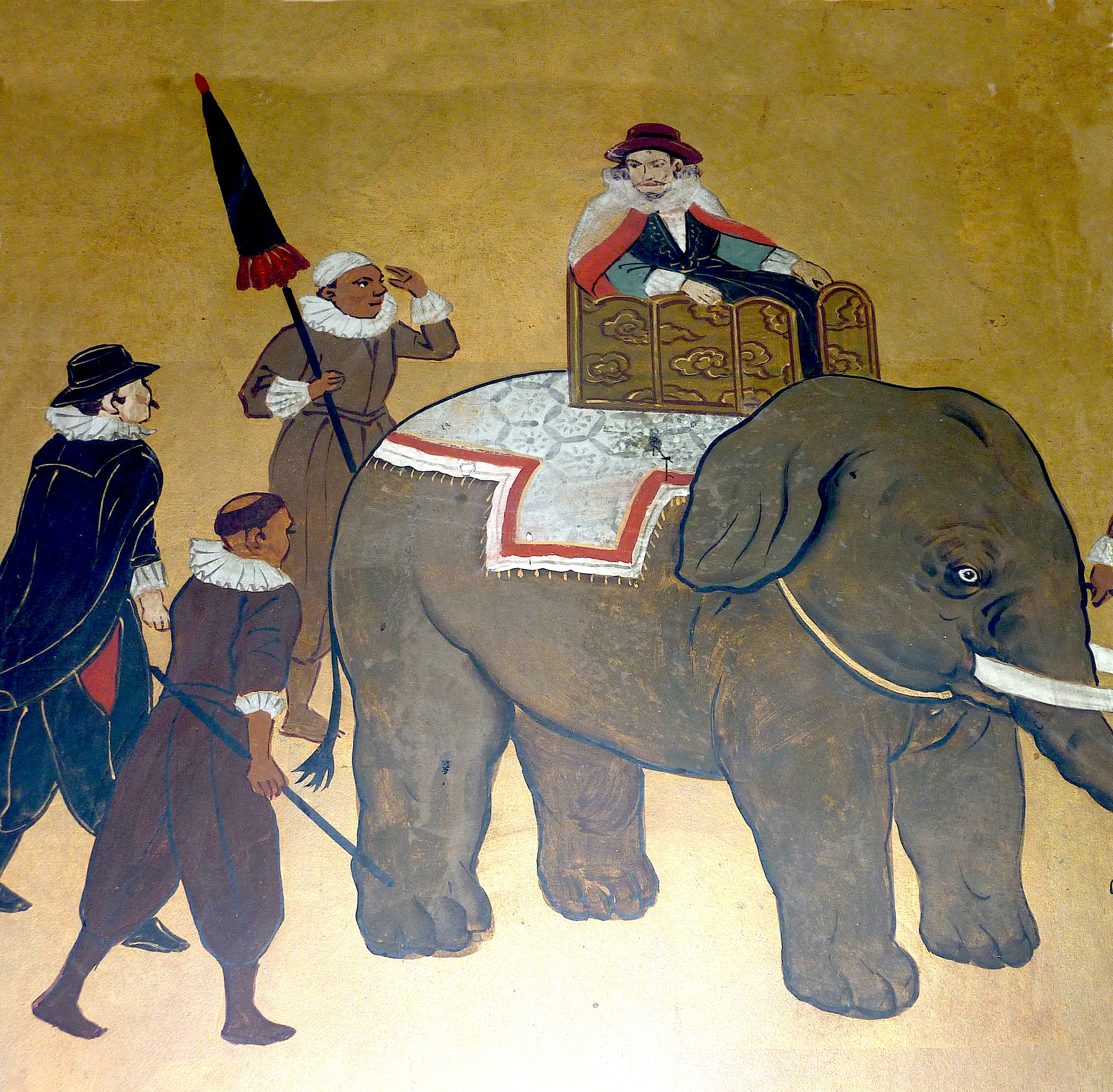
- Illustration of governor Filipe de Brito, c. 1600
Date	January 22–29, 1605
Location	Syriam, Myanmar
Result	Portuguese victory
Territorial changes	Portuguese capture of Cosmim fort

Belligerents
Kingdom of Portugal	Kingdom of Arakan; Kingdom of Pegu

Commanders and leaders
(Kingdom of Portugal) Filipe de Brito e Nicote (Kingdom of Portugal) Paulo do Rego Pinheiro	Min Razagyi of Arakan; Prince Min Khamaung of Arakan (POW); 2 Princes of Pegu; Other unnamed captains

Strength
Total: 3 galeots 4 fustas Unknown number of sanguiceis ~200 men	Total: 10 galeots 25 fustas 600 jáleas and other smaller vessels or 550 ships ~14,000–15,000 men

Casualties and losses
Unknown	Entire fleet destroyed or captured

The 1605 Syriam battles were a series of battles between Portuguese forces led by Filipe de Brito and Paulo do Rego Pinheiro and Arakan forces led by prince Min Khamaung by request of the king, Min Razagyi.

== Background ==
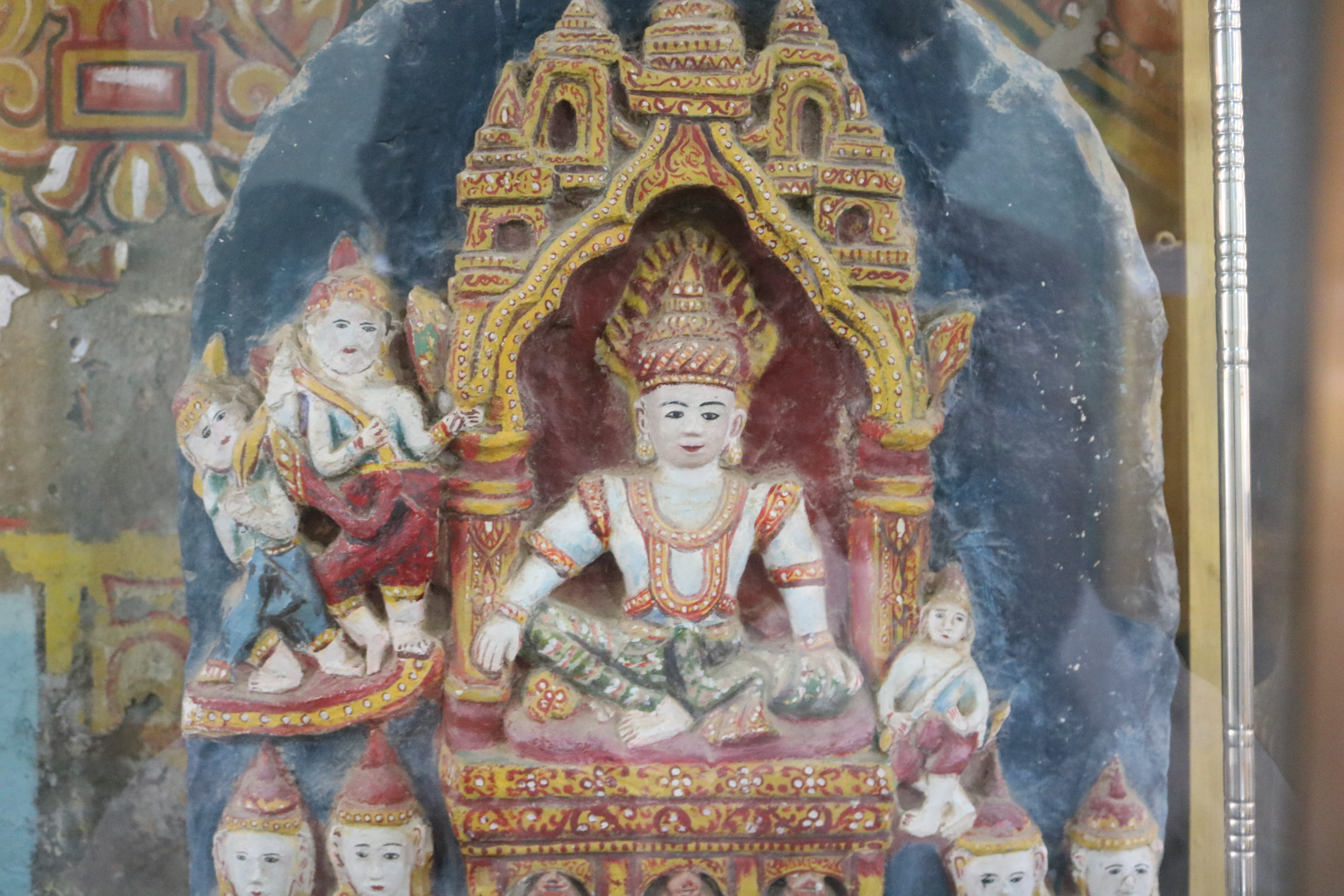
Min Razagyi of Arakan

Between 1600 and 1603, the Kingdom of Mrauk U with its powerful navy controlled over 1,000 miles (1,600 km) of the Bay of Bengal coastline following opportunistic attacks into Lower Burma during the collapse of the First Toungoo Empire. However, the navy was heavily dependent on Portuguese mercenaries and their firearms. Though the loyalty of the mercenaries was always suspect, Razagyi needed them to hold his maritime empire. He made Filipe de Brito governor of Syriam in June 1600. But De Brito revolted in March or April 1603 with support from the Portuguese viceroy of Goa, who appointed him governor of the new Syriam colony.

In 1604, the King of Arakan, Min Razagyi, determined to expel the Portuguese from the fortress at Syriam, gathered a substantial fleet to launch an attack, the force was led by his eldest son, Prince Min Khamaung of Arakan, accompanied by two princes of Pegu and all the main captains of his kingdom. The Portuguese responded with a much smaller fleet.

== Battles ==
=== Battle of Cape Negrais, January 22, 1605 ===
In response to the threat from Arakan, Filipe de Brito ordered the assembly of a Portuguese armada, commanded by Paulo do Rego Pinheiro. The Portuguese fleet consisted of 3 galeotas, 4 fustas, and some sanguiceis. They positioned just beyond Cape Negrais, hoping to catch the enemy unprepared. On January 22, 1605, a group of 10 ships from the Arakan fleet, led by Min Khamaung, was sighted, far ahead of the main body of their forces. With the advantage of surprise, the Portuguese launched an attack. The Portuguese defeated the Arakan vessels, capturing all 10 ships.

=== Battle of Syriam, January 28, 1605 ===
After their loss, the main Arakan fleet regrouped and arrived at Syriam. Determined to besiege the fortress, Min Khamaung led his fleet through the narrow rivers and canals that provided access to Syriam, only to find the Portuguese blocking the passage. On January 28, the Arakan forces launched an all out attack. Fierce cannon fire, musket shots, and black smoke filled the air, ultimately, the Portuguese repelled the first assault. However, the Arakan fleet regrouped and launched a second and third assault, with one of the Portuguese ships catching fire. Despite this, the Portuguese extinguished the flames and continued their resistance. The turning point came when two Portuguese fustas, returning from patrol, unexpectedly attacked the Arakan fleet from another direction. Surrounded by the Portuguese forces, the Arakan fleet retreated, but the Portuguese pursued and ultimately captured the remaining vessels.

After the defeat of his fleet, the Prince of Arakan attempted to escape with his remaining ships, retreating into narrow rivers. The Portuguese fleet, led by their sanguiceis, anticipated his escape route and trapped the Arakan fleet. The remaining Arakan ships, unable to flee, were captured, and the Prince's forces were forced to abandon their vessels and retreat to the land. This marked the end of the naval campaign, as all the ships of the Arakan fleet were captured by the Portuguese.

=== Capture of Cosmim and the Prince of Arakan, January 29, 1605 ===
With the Arakan fleet destroyed, the Portuguese turned their attention to the land. A day later, they launched an attack on the fortress of Cosmim, which surrendered without a fight. Following this, a Portuguese force under Filipe de Brito set out in pursuit of the prince. On land, the Portuguese encountered the remaining Arakan and Pegu forces. Despite being outnumbered, the Portuguese defeated the enemy in a fierce battle, and prince Min Khamaung was captured.

== Aftermath ==
In addition to the prince's capture, the Portuguese seized over a 1,000 cannons, vast quantities of ammunition and supplies, and around 600 vessels. Thousands of captives were also taken. The King of Arakan, desperate to secure the release of his son, was forced to negotiate a peace treaty with Filipe de Brito. The terms of the treaty were heavily favorable to the Portuguese.

== See also ==
- Mrauk U invasion of Pegu

== Bibliography ==
- Monteiro, Saturnino. "BATALHAS E COMBATES da Marinha Portuguesa" (in Portuguese). Archived from the original on 19 October 2004.
- Lach, Donald (1965). Asia in the Making of Europe. Vol. 3. University of Chicago Press. ISBN 978-0-226-46768-9.
