= Filipe de Brito e Nicote =

Portuguese mercenary in southeast Asia

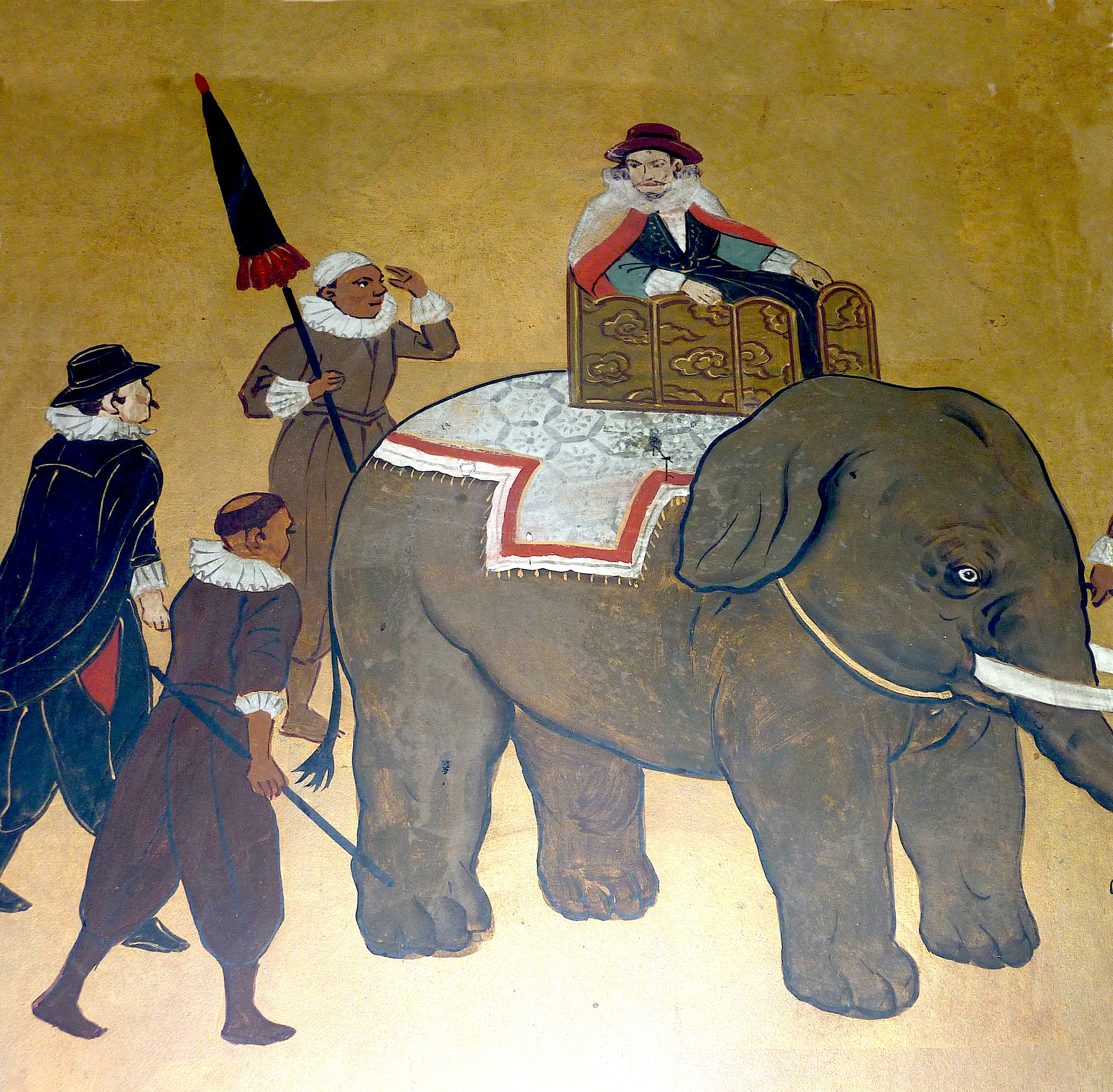
- A Portuguese man, assumed to be de Brito, atop an elephant, c. 1600

King of Pegu
- In office 1602 – April 1613

Governor of Syriam
- In office 1599–1602

Personal details
- Born: c. 1566 Lisbon, Kingdom of Portugal
- Died: April 1613 Syriam, Burma
- Cause of death: Impalement
- Relatives: Jean Nicot (paternal uncle)
- Mercenary career
- Nicknames: Nga JangKaa (Burmese), Nga AngGaa (Arakanese)
- Allegiance: Portugal; Mrauk-U (1599-1602); Ayutthaya
- Rank: General; Commander
- Conflicts: Burmese–Portuguese conflicts; Mrauk U invasion of Pegu; 1605 Syriam battles

Filipe de Brito e Nicote or Nga Zinga, (Note: Burmese: ငဇင်ကာ, pronounced [ŋə zɪ̀ɰ̃kà], also spelled as "Nga Anggaa" in Arakanese) also called Zwing Gaa Bu (Note: Burmese: ဇွင်ဂါဘူ, Burmese pronunciation: [zwɪ̀ɴɡàbù]) (c. 1566 – April 1613), was a Portuguese adventurer and mercenary in the service of the Arakanese kingdom of Mrauk U, and later of the Siamese Kingdom of Ayutthaya. His name is also recorded with the French spelling Philippe de Brito.

== Biography ==
Born to a French father in Lisbon, Portugal, de Brito first travelled to Southeast Asia as a cabin boy.

He eventually served under Min Razagyi, King of Arakan, and became governor of Syriam (now Thanlyin) in 1599, commanding three frigates and 3,000 men. He encouraged more Portuguese to settle in Syriam (see Bayingyi) and constructed forts for defence, eventually seizing control and announcing his independence from Arakan in 1603. He captured Min Khamaung, crown prince of Arakan, when Toungoo and Arakan attacked in the 1605 Syriam battles, keeping him hostage until granted independence. De Brito then married the daughter of Bannya Dala of Martaban, becoming a subject of the Kingdom of Ayutthaya (Siam, present-day Thailand).

Returning to Goa the next year to gain official recognition, he returned in 1602, awarded the titles "Commander of Syriam", "General of the conquests of Pegu", and "King of Pegu" by the Portuguese royal court.

King Ekathotsarot of Ayutthaya mobilized Bannya Dala and de Brito to come to the aid of Toungoo, when attacked by Ava, and after Toungoo's king Natshinnaung had asked to be subject to Ayutthaya. Before they could arrive, however, Toungoo had submitted to the king of Ava. Bannya Dala and de Brito then burnt down Toungoo and brought back any remaining property and people, including Natshinnaung, to Syriam. De Brito took the opportunity of "seizing objects of worship of the Buddha" and "committed sacrilege to the point of forcibly demolishing Buddha images and sacred shrines and pagodas."

In 1608, De Brito and his men, using elephants and forced labour, removed the Dhammazedi Bell from the Shwedagon Pagoda and rolled it down Singuttara Hill to a raft on the Pazundaung Creek. The bell and raft were lashed to de Brito's flagship for the journey across the river to Syriam, to be melted down and made into cannons. The load proved too heavy, and at the confluence of the Pegu and Yangon Rivers, off what is now known as Monkey Point, the raft broke apart and the bell went to the bottom, taking de Brito's ship with it.

In 1613, de Brito's Syriam was besieged by the Burmese forces of King Anaukpetlun. After the fall of the city in April 1613, de Brito was executed along with Natshinnaung. De Brito was executed by being impaled; it took him three days to die. More than 400 Portuguese were taken back to Ava as prisoners of war.
