= Burmese–Portuguese conflicts =

16th-17th century conflict in Asia

- Part of Portuguese presence in Asia
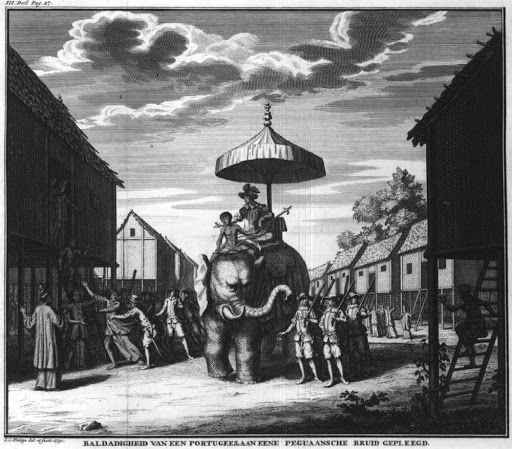
- Portuguese ruler and soldiers mounting an elephant, Jan Caspar Philips
Date	1539–1666
Location	Myanmar

Belligerents
(Kingdom of Portugal) Kingdom of Portugal; Kingdom of Martaban	Kingdom of Mrauk U Kingdom of Pegu; Kingdom of Prome; Kingdom of Toungoo; Kingdom of Ava; Dutch East India Company

Commanders and leaders
(Kingdom of Portugal) Filipe de Brito (executed) (Kingdom of Portugal) João de Oliva (Kingdom of Portugal) Paulo do Rego † (Kingdom of Portugal) Salvador Ribeiro (Kingdom of Portugal) Rodrigo Alvares (Kingdom of Portugal) Bartholomew Ferreira; King of Martaban (Kingdom of Portugal) Diogo de Mendoça (Kingdom of Portugal) Christovam Rabello (Kingdom of Portugal) Sebastião Gonzales; Raja of Bakla (initially); Raja of Tipperah (Kingdom of Portugal) Francisco de Menezes Roxo † (Kingdom of Portugal) Gaspar de Abreu (DOW)	Min Razagyi; Banadala; King Massinga †; Min Khamaung (POW); 2 Princes of Pegu; King of Toungoo (POW); Anaukpetlun; Raja of Bakla

The Burmese–Portuguese conflicts were a series of military engagements between the Kingdom of Portugal and the kingdoms located in present–day Myanmar from 1539 to 1666.

== Early conflicts ==
Prior to Filipe de Brito e Nicote's arrival in Burma in the 1600s, the Portuguese had already participated in or assisted in battles, most notably during the Toungoo–Ava War.

=== Capture of Pegu, 1539 ===
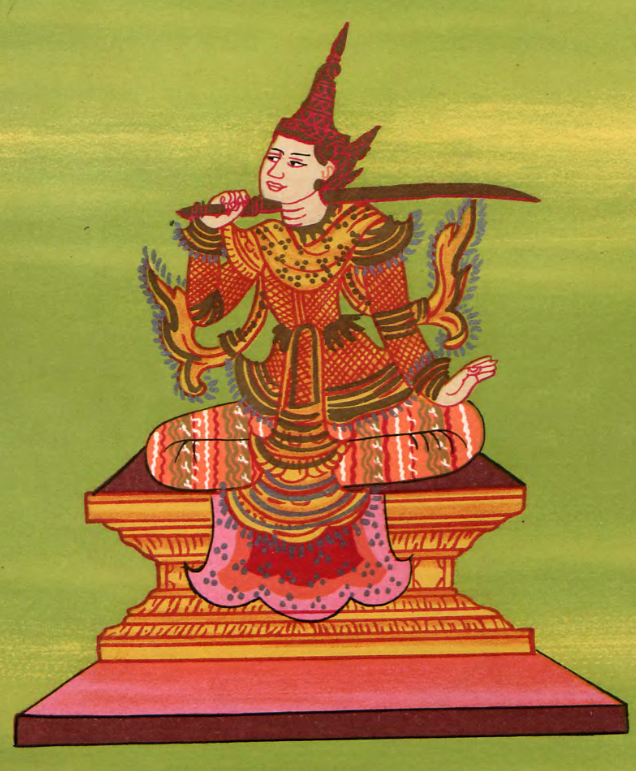
Tabinshwehti Nat

During Tabinshwehti's attempts to attack the Pegu, Portuguese forces were involved in their defense. A Portuguese commander, Ferdinand de Morales, led a galliot sent from Goa to assist the city's defenders. This is the first occasion on which Europeans took part in the wars of Burma, however Tabinshwehti was able to capture Pegu.

=== Siege of Martaban, 1540 ===
The Viceroy of Martaban, resisting Tabinshwehti's authority, relied on Portuguese military support. 7 heavily armed European ships were stationed at Martaban's port. Despite this, Tabinshwehti's forces, under Bayinnaung, laid siege to the city for seven months, eventually setting the ships on fire with flaming bamboo rafts. After famine forced Martaban's surrender, the Viceroy and his family were executed, and the city was destroyed.

=== Attack on Prome, 1542 ===
During the attack of Prome, Portuguese gunners accompanied Bayinnaung's forces, contributing to a victory over the Shan army sent from Ava and the Arakanese reinforcements.

=== Attack on Siam, 1548 ===
Portuguese soldiers also served in Tabinshwehti's army during his campaign against Ayutthaya. Among them was a Portuguese contingent under James Soarez. However, the campaign ended in failure, with heavy losses due to enemy attacks, disease, and starvation.

=== Conquest of Ava, 1555 ===
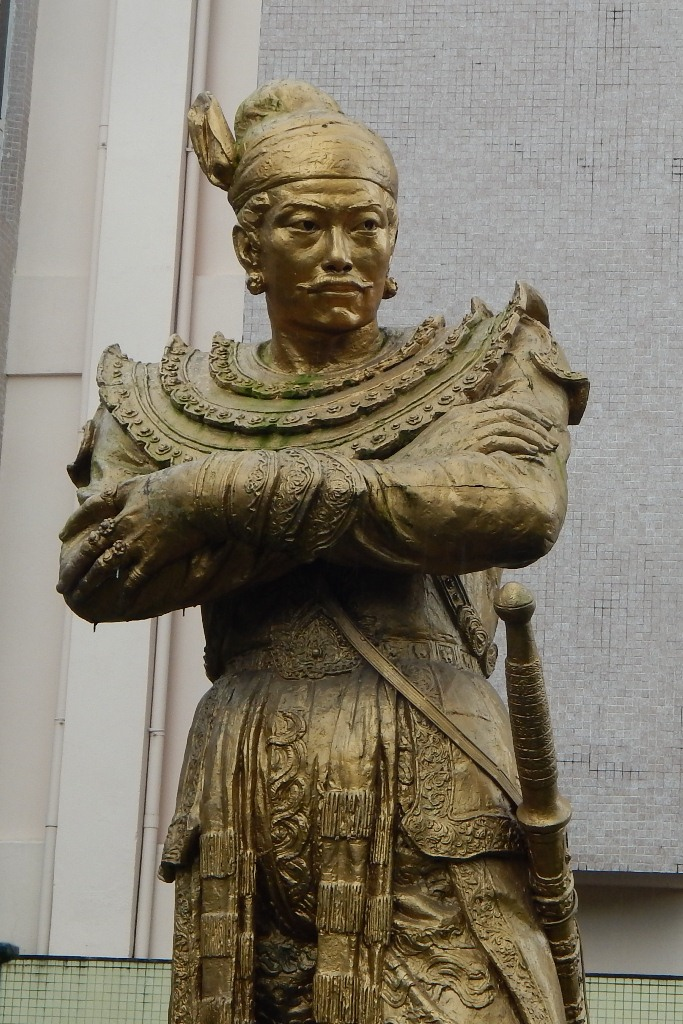
Statue of Bayinnaung

In March 1555, Bayinnaung utilized a bodyguard of 400 Portuguese mercenaries, equipped with arquebuses and dressed in uniform, during his campaign to conquer Ava. After an assault, Ava fell to the conqueror.

=== Incident at Cape Negrais, 1580 ===
In 1580, a Burmese fleet encountered Portuguese ships near Cape Negrais. The Portuguese captured several Burmese vessels but were outnumbered and had to withdraw.

== Background ==
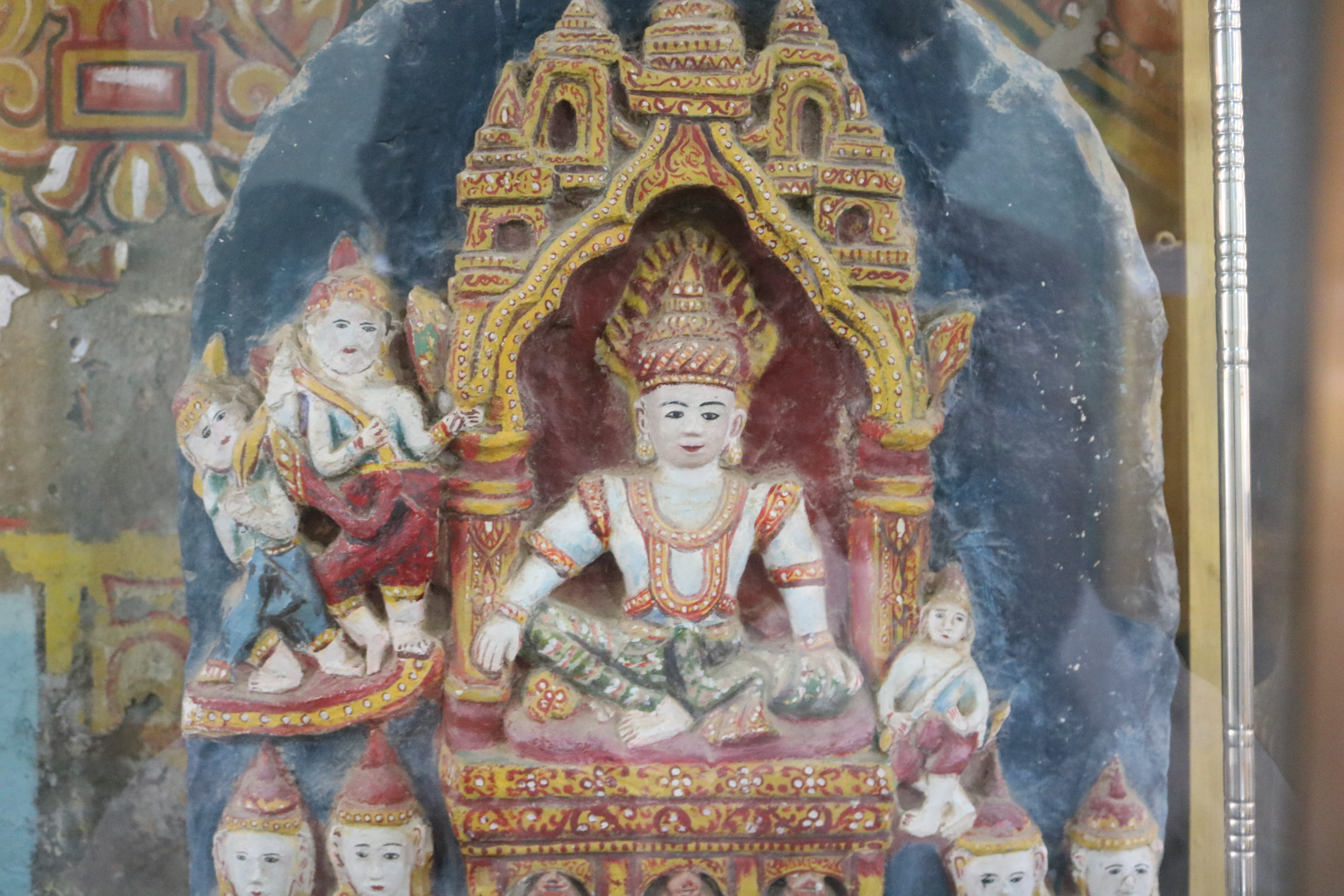
Min Razagyi of Arakan

In 1596, Min Razagyi, the King of Arakan, having conquered Syriam and the Kingdom of Pegu, sought to reward the Portuguese for their assistance by granting them the port of Syriam.

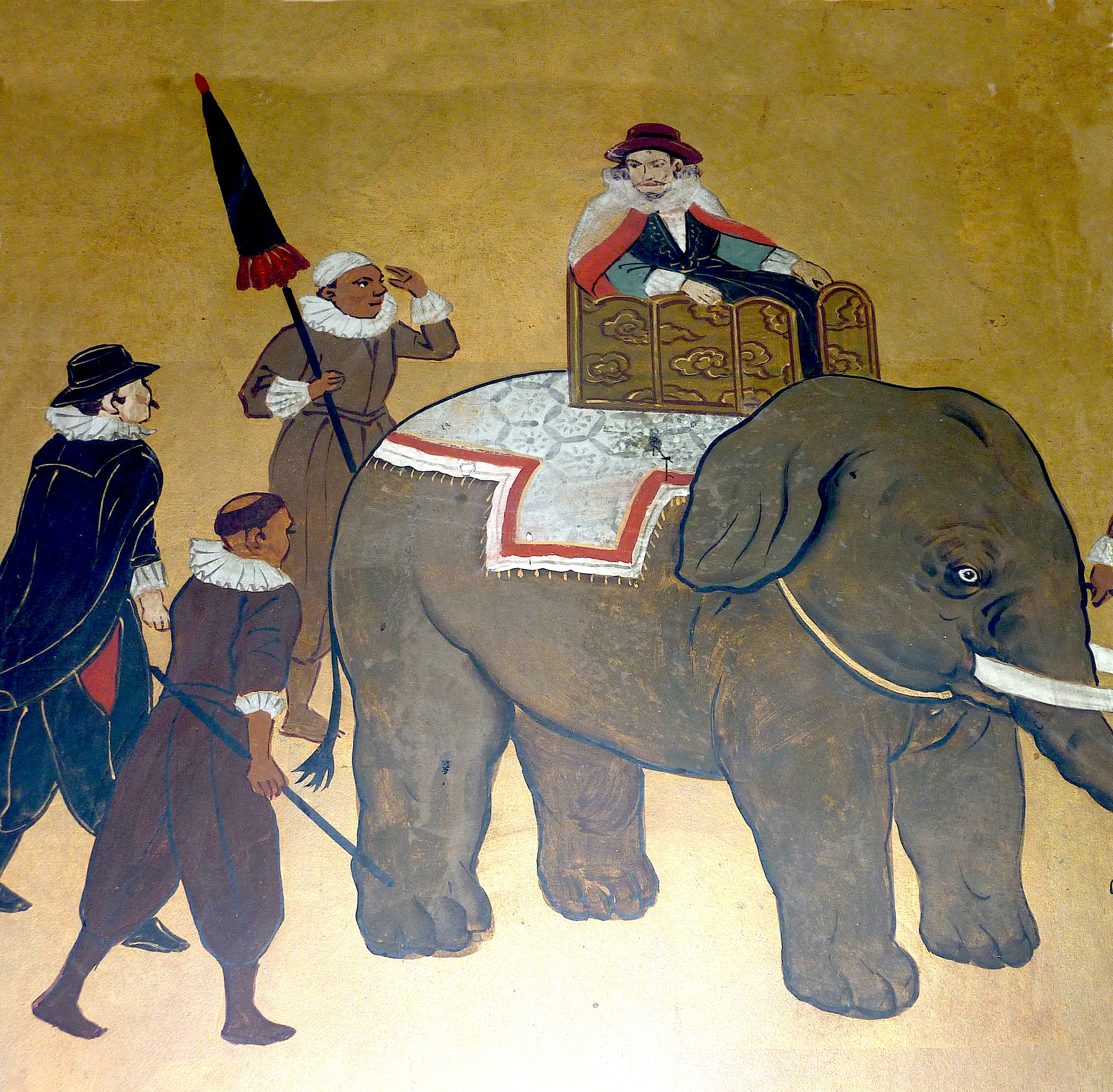
Filipe de Brito e Nicote

In the 1600s, Filipe de Brito, a native of Lisbon of French nationality, who was described as ambitious, then convinced the king to establish a customs house at the river's mouth. In reality, De Brito intended to turn it into a fortress, which he planned to use as a base for Portuguese operations to the eventual conquest of the whole kingdom. Once the customs house was completed, the king placed it in charge of one Banadala, who, suspecting De Brito, fortified the site and barred Portuguese entry.

Frustrated, De Brito resolved to seize the fort by force before its defenses were fully operational.

== Course of hostilities ==
=== Attack on Syriam, 1600s ===
With the support of three Portuguese officers, João de Oliva, Paulo do Rego, Salvador Ribeiro, and a contingent of 50 men, De Brito launched a surprise attack, ousting Banadala, who retreated to a nearby island and fortified himself. Banadala then gathered a force of 1,000 men, and took the treasures belonging to the pagoda of Digan.

When King Min Razagyi learned of Banadala's actions, he considered sending reinforcements to aid him. However, De Brito convinced him otherwise, labeling Banadala as a "sacrilegious robber". De Brito volunteered to mediate the situation, a proposal the king accepted. De Brito used this opportunity to strengthen the fortifications at the customs house under his own directions, and by his own men.

=== First attack by Banadala ===
De Brito proceeded to Goa, leaving Salvador Ribeiro de Sousa in charge of the fort. After his departure, the King of Arakan ordered the expulsion of all Portuguese from his kingdom. Banadala led a fleet of 6,000 men to enforce this order, but they were met by 3 vessels with 30 Portuguese under Salvador Ribeiro. He and his men, in a short time and without suffering any losses, captured 40 ships and forced the rest of the enemy to flee.

=== Siege of Syriam ===
The King of Arakan sought assistance from the King of Prome, and a combined fleet of 1,200 ships attacked the Portuguese position. Additionally, 40,000 men besieged the fortress by land. Ribeiro and his small force defended the position, and at one point, Ribeiro made a successful night raid, killing the enemy general and scattering the attacking forces.

=== Second attack by Banadala ===
Banadala returned with a larger force of 8,000 men. He bombarded the fort for a whole day and launched a night assault. The assault was however repelled, with 1,000 enemy casualties found the next morning. The siege continued for eight months, with some Portuguese deserters, but in order to prevent others from following their example, Ribeiro burnt all the ships that were in the port.

=== Portuguese counterattack ===
Salvador Ribeiro, with 800 Portuguese reinforcements, launched a surprise attack on Banadala's army. After a struggle, the Portuguese succeeded, forcing Banadala's forces to flee. Ribeiro then destroyed all the enemy's siege works.

=== Third attack by Banadala ===
While the Portuguese garrison was reduced to 200 men, Banadala returned to besiege the fort. He brought moving castles and fireworks, however, a fiery meteor in the sky frightened the besiegers, causing them to flee and abandon their equipment, which the Portuguese quickly destroyed.

=== Battle of Camelan and acclamation of Filipe de Brito as king ===
Besides this success, Ribeiro also defeated the King Massinga in the province of Camelan (?Kamanlay). The king was slain, and great damage was inflicted on his forces both by land and sea.

These victories increased the reputation of the Portuguese among the people of Pegu, who were eager to work for them. Soon, the Portuguese had the support of 20,000 natives.

Due to Filipe de Brito's success and his kind nature, the people proclaimed him king. In his absence, Salvador Ribeiro accepted the crown on his behalf. When De Brito returned, he officially received the kingdom in the name of the King of Spain and Portugal.

Rodrigo Alvares de Sequeira then took command of the Syriam fort and defended it successfully until it was accidentally burned, leaving only the walls standing.

=== De Brito's return and Incident at Coromandel coast ===
De Brito then returned to Syriam with reinforcements and 6 vessels. Once there, he repaired the fort, built a church, and sent a rich gift to the King of Arakan, who had welcomed him upon his arrival. He then issued orders for the Custom House there, following instructions from the Viceroy. These rules required all ships trading along the Pegu coast to register there. As certain vessels from the coast of Coromandel refused to obey these orders, De Brito sent Dom Francisco de Moura with 6 vessels to enforce trade compliance from vessels trading to Pegu. Moura defeated the disobedient ships and captured 2 ships from Achin.

=== Arakanese attack ===
De Brito dispatched Bartholomew Ferreira to confront 20 jalias prepared by the King of Arakan for an attack. Ferreira easily defeated and dispersed the fleet, forcing them to retreat to the territory of the King of Jangona.

=== 1605 Syriam battles ===
On January 22, 1605, the Portuguese fleet under Paulo do Rego ambushed and captured 10 Arakan ships near Cape Negrais.

6 days later, on January 28, the main Arakan fleet, led by Min Khamaung, attacked Syriam but was repelled by the Portuguese after intense fighting. The Portuguese counterattacked, surrounded the Arakan fleet, and captured all remaining ships, forcing the Prince of Arakan to flee.

On January 29, the Portuguese captured the fortress of Cosmim (or Chinim) without resistance and pursued the prince. They defeated the remaining Arakan and Pegu forces on land and captured Prince Min Khamaung.

=== Siege of Syriam ===
The King of Toungoo allied with the King of Arakan to attack Syriam. Toungoo's forces included 10,000 men on land and a fleet of 800 ships. Paulo do Rego engaged the fleet with 80 Portuguese ships but, overwhelmed, he detonated his powder magazine, destroying his ship and its crew to avoid capture. Despite the Portuguese already preparing to surrender, the King of Toungoo raised the siege, causing both the land and naval forces to withdraw.

=== Massacre at Dianga, 1607 ===
Dianga massacres
- Part of the Burmese–Portuguese conflicts in Portuguese presence in Asia
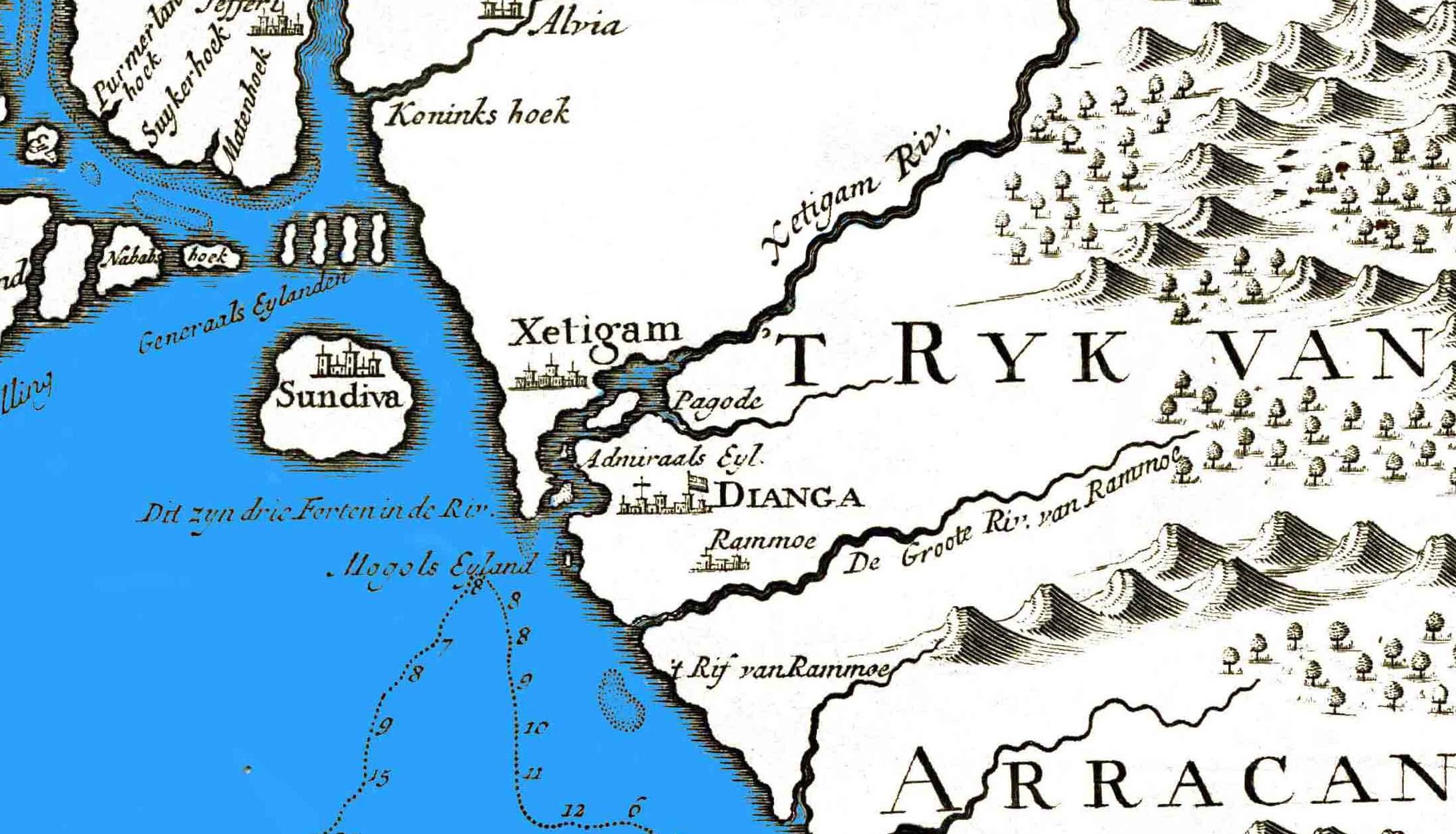
- A 1724 map showing the island of Dianga
- Location: Dianga, East Bengal (present-day southern bank of Karnaphuli River, Bangladesh)
- Date: 1607
- Target: Portuguese
- Deaths: 600 fatalities
- Perpetrator: Min Razagyi of Mrauk U Kingdom

In 1607, a series of violent actions were initiated by Min Razagyi, culminating in the massacre of the Portuguese community in Dianga. The immediate trigger for these events was the decision by the Arakanese king to retaliate against the Portuguese, who had, according to him, received much aid from him but had betrayed him bitterly. This resulted in the death and capture of about 600 Portuguese by Min Razagyi, leading to widespread destruction in Bengal. Min Razagyi later explained in a letter to the Dutch East India Company (VOC) that he had been waiting for their assistance, but due to delays in their arrival, he was forced to take action against the Portuguese.

One of the most notable casualties of the massacre was Manuel de Mattos, the leader of the Portuguese community in East Bengal, who was allegedly poisoned by the Arakanese.

Sebastião Gonçalves Tibao was one of the few Portuguese who survived the massacres. He had initially arrived in Bengal as a soldier, like many other Portuguese adventurers, and had managed to buy a small ship.

=== Expedition against Toungoo, 1612 ===
After a treaty with the King of Toungoo, De Brito violated the agreement. With assistance from the King of Martaban, De Brito launched an expedition against Toungoo in 1612, he plundered the city, burned the palace and captured the King of Toungoo, he looted over a million in gold, returning to Syriam with his prisoner.

=== Fall of Syriam, April 1613 ===
In April 1613, the King of Ava, Anaukpetlun, marched an army of 120,000 men and a fleet of 400 ships against Syriam. After a 34–day siege, the fortress fell. The defenders, led by Filipe de Brito, were overwhelmed by the King of Ava's forces, and De Brito, along with other Portuguese leaders, was executed.

=== Battle of Martaban, 1613 ===
As soon as the Viceroy heard of the siege of Syriam, he dispatched Diogo de Mendoça Furtado, with 5 galliots to its relief. Furtado encountered a fleet of 20 ships near Martaban, and after a sharp engagement, he captured 4 vessels and learned of Syriam's fall, and therefore proceeded no further.

=== Battle at Tenasserim ===
After succeeding in the defeat of the Portuguese at Syriam, the King of Ava now thought to make himself master of all the neighboring country. He sent an army of 50,000 men and a fleet of 500 sail to subjugate the King of Tavoy, whom he defeated and made tributary. Christovam Rabello, with only 4 galliots, 40 Portuguese and 70 slaves, attacked the Ava fleet, burned several ships, killed 2,000 men, and forced the fleet to retreat.

=== Capture of Sandwip ===
Sebastião Gonzales Tibao, a Portuguese adventurer who had survived the Arakanese attack on Dianga, entered the service of the Raja of Bakla (or King of Bacala), a local potentate in what is now the Bakirgunj district, who sought his assistance in a feud against another ruler in the island of Sandwip. With 40 ships and 400 Portuguese sailors, Gonzales launched an attack on Sandwip, capturing the port and massacring its inhabitants. After this victory, he turned against the Raja of Bakla, seizing Sandwip and two neighboring islands, Xavaspur and Patelabanga, for himself.

=== Portuguese "alliance" with Arakan and betrayal ===
The governor of Chittagong, after falling out with his brother, the King of Arakan, fled to Sandwip and was welcomed by Gonzales, who married his sister. However, the governor soon died, reportedly poisoned, and Gonzales seized all of his wealth. Despite that, Gonzales entered into an alliance with the King of Arakan, who sought his assistance against the Mughal forces. The King's army achieved initial success, but at sea, Gonzales had only considered his own interests. He called the Arakanese captains under a council and murdered them, capturing their ships to adding them to his own fleet.

The King of Arakan retaliated by executing Gonzales's nephew, who had been given to him as a hostage. In response, Gonzales entered the Arakan River with a fleet, ravaging villages along its banks and capturing several European merchant ships, likely Dutch, that had been trading in the area.

=== Portuguese raids on Arakan ===
After the Moguls' victory in Balua, Gonzalez exploited the weakened state of Arakan. He launched raids along the coast, plundering and destroying undefended forts that had relied on the peace treaty for protection. Gonzalez advanced to the city of Arakan, where he burned numerous merchant ships and looted their cargo.

=== Attack on Chittagong, ~1612 ===
The death of the King of Arakan in 1612 brought his son, Min Khamaung, to the throne. He was determined to attack Gonzales, so he led his army to Chittagong while his fleet moved along the coast. However, the Arakanese forces encountered resistance from the Raja of Tipperah, resulting in a retreat before they could achieve their objective.

=== First battle at Arakan, October 15, 1616 ===
On the 15th of October an enormous fleet belonging to the King of Arakan was seen coming down the river, headed by some Dutch vessels. Dom Francisco de Menezes Roxo, commanding the Portuguese fleet, engaged near the river. The battle lasted an entire day with heavy losses on both sides before the Arakan and the Dutch withdrew during the night.

=== Second battle at Arakan, November, 1616 ===
After Sebastião Gonzales Tibao joined the Portuguese fleet with 50 vessels, a second battle was fought. Dom Francisco was killed by a musket ball during the battle, causing Sebastião Gonzales to withdraw. The fleets parted, but Gaspar de Abreu's galliot was left behind and destroyed, with all aboard killed. Gaspar de Abreu was, however, brought off by Antonio Carvalho mortally wounded, and he died a few days later.

=== Recapture of Sandwip, 1617 ===
Following the retreat of the Portuguese fleet, the King of Arakan, Min Khamaung, arrived with a force at Sandwip in 1617, recapturing the island and ending Sebastião Gonzales Tibao's rule and Portuguese connection in the region. Gonzales disappeared after the engagement.

== Later conflicts ==
=== Mughal conquest of Chittagong, 1665–1666 ===
In 1664, the Arakanese, aided by Portuguese pirates, attacked Dhaka, destroying 160 Mughal ships. In response, Shaista Khan launched a campaign to crush the Arakanese.

By November 1665, the Mughals, with Dutch and Portuguese naval support, captured Sandwip. A Mughal force of 6,500, led by Shaista Khan's son, Buzurg Ummed Khan, advanced toward Chittagong. On January 27, 1666, the Mughals seized Chittagong after a three–day siege.

== See also ==
- Bayingyi people

== Bibliography ==
- Danvers, Frederick (1894). The Portuguese In India. Vol. 2.
- Monteiro, Saturnino. "BATALHAS E COMBATES da Marinha Portuguesa" (in Portuguese). Archived from the original on 2004-10-19.
- Lach, Donald (1965). Asia in the Making of Europe. Vol. 3. University of Chicago Press.
- Kerr, Robert (1812). A General History of Voyages and Travels to the End of the 18th Century. Vol. 6. Robert Kerr.
- Hosten, H. (May 15, 2017). Travels of Fray Sebastien Manrique 1629-1643. Taylor & Francis. ISBN 9781317006404.
- Stuart, John (1909). Burma through the centuries. London : K. Paul, Trench, Trübner & co., limited.
