= Outline of advertising =

Form of communication for marketing, typically paid for

The following outline is provided as an overview of and topical guide to advertising:

Advertising is the practice and techniques employed to bring attention to a product or service. Advertising aims to present a product or service in terms of utility, advantages, and qualities of interest to consumers. It is typically used to promote a specific good or service, but there are a wide range of uses, the most common being commercial advertisement.

== What type of thing is advertising? ==
Advertising can be described as all of the following:

- An application of communication –
- A business activity –
  - A method of marketing – business process of creating relationships with and satisfying customers.

== Types of advertising and advertisements ==
- Aerial advertising
- Barn advertisement
- Comparative advertising
- Contextual advertising
- Forehead advertising
- Gladvertising
- Guerrilla marketing
- In-flight advertising
- In-game advertising
- Informative advertising
- Local advertising
- Non-commercial advertising
- Online advertising
- Out-of-home advertising
- Parody advertisement
- Performance-based advertising
- Prommercial
- Radio advertisement
- Recruitment advertising
- Shock advertising
- Social network advertising
- Space advertising
- Television advertisement
- Virtual advertising

== History of advertising ==
History of advertising

== Advertising methods ==
- Ad-ID –
- Advertainment –
- Advertising in video games –
- Angel dusting –
- Bait-and-switch –
- Celebrity branding –
- Media clip –
- Consumer-generated advertising –
- DAGMAR marketing –
- Debranding –
- Display window –
- Dolly Dimples (Utah) –
- Doorbuster –
- Employee pricing –
- FAST marketing –
- Fear pattern –
- Freebie marketing –
- Hard sell –
- Product demonstration –
- Incomplete comparison –
- Inconsistent comparison –
- Location-based advertising –
- Loss leader –
- Pay-per-call advertising –
- Promotional merchandise –
- Repetition variation –
- Roll-in –
- Soft sell –
- Surrogate advertising –
- Testimonial –
- Trailer (promotion) –
- Transfer (propaganda) –
- Transpromotional –
- Trojan horse (business) –
- Unipole sign –
- Video in print –

== Advertising awards ==
- ADDY Awards
- British Television Advertising Awards
- Clio awards
- Cresta International Advertising Awards
- London International Awards

== Advertising organizations ==
- The Ad Club
- Advertising Association
- The Advertising Club of New York
- Advertising Research Foundation
- Advertising Self-Regulatory Council
- Advertising Specialty Institute
- Advertising Standards Authority (United Kingdom)
- Advertising Standards Board of Finance
- Advertising Standards Council of India
- Advertising Women of New York
- American Association of Advertising Agencies
- AMIN Worldwide
- Associated Motion Picture Advertisers
- Association of Independent Commercial Producers
- Association of National Advertisers
- Australian Association of National Advertisers
- Broadcast Advertising Standards Board of Finance
- Cabletelevision Advertising Bureau
- Center on Media and Child Health
- Children's Advertising Review Unit
- Commercial Closet Association
- Committee of Advertising Practice
- Digital Kitchen
- Digital Place-based Advertising Association
- E3 Agency Network
- The Electronic Cable Committee
- History of Advertising Trust
- Hook Advertising
- Institute of Practitioners in Advertising
- Interactive Advertising Bureau
- Internet Advertising Bureau
- Japan Advertising Photographers' Association
- National Advertising Division
- Outdoor Media Association
- OVAB Europe
- Philippine Advertising Congress
- Radio Advertising Bureau (UK)
- Radio Advertising Bureau (US)
- Sphinx Club (New York)
- Television Bureau of Advertising
- Utenti Pubblicità Associati
- World Federation of Advertisers

== Advertising publications ==
=== Books about advertising ===
- Buyology
- Confessions of an Advertising Man
- Digital Doesn't Matter
- A Guide to Window-Dressing

== Persons influential in advertising ==
- Leo Burnett
- Leon Carr – composer of jingles, like "Sometimes you feel like a nut".
- Milton Glaser
- Chip Kidd
- Larry Page
- Paul Rand
- Rosser Reeves
- Massimo Vignelli
- John Wanamaker
- Mark Zuckerberg

== See also ==
- Outline of marketing
