= Adweek =

Weekly American advertising trade publication

- CEO: Will Lee
- Categories: Global marketing and advertising
- Frequency: Monthly magazine, daily digital
- Founded: 1979; 47 years ago
- Company: Shamrock Capital
- Country: United States
- Based in: New York City
- Language: English
- Website: adweek.com
- ISSN: 0199-2864
- OCLC: 52059332

Adweek is a weekly American advertising trade publication that was first published in 1979. Adweek covers marketing, creativity, client–agency relationships and the media, technology and platforms which support the global marketing ecosystem. During its time, it has covered various shifts in technology, including cable television, the shift away from commission-based agency fees, and the Internet.

As the second-largest advertising-trade publication, its main competitor is Ad Age. Adweek also operates the Adweek Blog Network, which was formed from the assets of Mediabistro.

Related publications include Brandweek, Adweek Magazine's Technology Marketing (ISSN 1536-2272), and Marketing Week (ISSN 0892-8274).

In 2018, the company produced the first Brandweek, event, a first-of-its-kind summit held September 23–25, 2018 in Palm Springs, Calif. Subsequent summits have been held in Miami. Brandweek was also previously a weekly American marketing trade publication that was published between 1986 and April 2011.

== History ==
In 1990, Affiliated Publications Inc., which publishes The Boston Globe, agreed to acquire 80 percent of the outstanding common stock of A/S/M Communications Inc., which published Adweek. The magazine stabilized in the 1990s under Verenigde Nederlandse Uitgeverijen's BPI Communications (VNU, later known as Nielson).

In April 2008, Alison Fahey, Adweek's editor of ten years, was promoted to publisher and editorial director. She was replaced as editor by Mike Chapman, formerly of the Economist Intelligence Unit and eMarketer.

On June 2, 2020, Los Angeles–based investment firm Shamrock Capital acquired Adweek from Canadian private equity firm Beringer Capital, which had acquired Adweek in July 2016.

On July 26, 2023, Will Lee was announced as Adweek's CEO.

On November 30, 2023, Zoë Ruderman was announced as Chief Content Officer and Drew Schutte as Chief Revenue Officer.

== Blog network ==
On January 15, 2015, after the acquisition of its previous parent, Mediabistro, by Prometheus Global Media, Adweek formed the "Adweek Blog Network," which consists of several B2B blogs about aspects of the mass media industry. They include AgencySpy, which focuses on advertising news, TVNewser, which focuses on cable and broadcast TV and streaming news and TVSpy, which focuses on local television news. Other sites included FishbowlDC, focused on politics and the media, FishbowlNY, focused on New York City media, GalleyCat, which focused on book publishing, LostRemote, which focused on social television, PRNewser, which focused on public relations and SocialTimes, which covered social media platforms.

The most notable member of the blog network is TVNewser, which focuses on the American news media and broadcast industry. The site was founded as CableNewser by then–Towson University student Brian Stelter in January 2004, who maintained the site until joining The New York Times as a media reporter in July 2007. Former MSNBC producer Chris Ariens took on the role of editor in 2007 and is now Adweek's SVP and Editorial Director. TVNewser is highly-read within the broadcasting industry: The New York Times characterized the site as being "read religiously by network presidents, media executives, producers and publicists ... because it provides a quick snapshot of the industry on any given day." Brian Williams, then anchor of NBC Nightly News, described the blog as "the closest thing to the bible of what's going on in [the news broadcasting] industry." CNN's Miles O'Brien felt that the site "makes me feel like I'm in the middle of a cocktail party of all people who know what's going on in my business." Both MSNBC's Dan Abrams and CNN's Jeff Greenfield have lauded the site for being good at separating fact from fiction.

== Adweek awards ==
Each year Adweek honors companies and individuals in the marketing and media industry by giving out several different awards, such as the Adweek 50, Brand Genius, Creative 100, Agency of the Year, Media Plan of the Year and Marketing Vanguard.

Adweek's Media All-Stars has been running since 1985 and honors individuals in these categories: Executive of the Year, Rising Star and All Stars.

== See also ==
- List of AIGA medalists
- D&AD
- AIGA
- Core77
- Ad Age
- Adland
