= Adland =

Advertising industry website

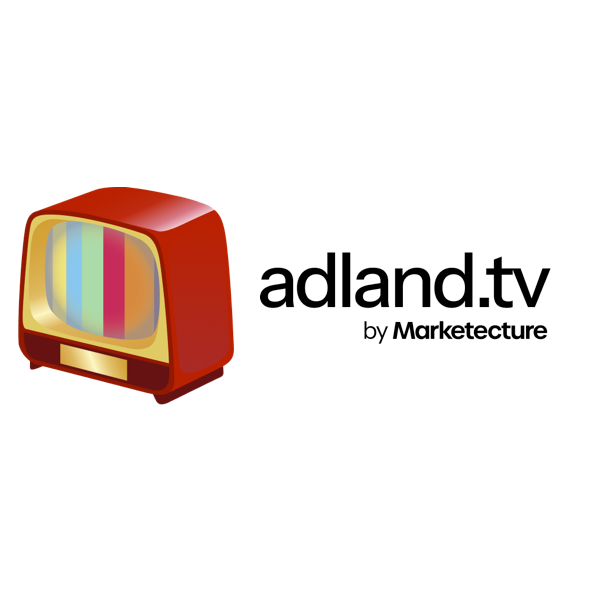
- Editor: Ari Paparo
- Publisher: Marketecture Media, Inc
- Founded: April 1, 1996; 30 years ago
- Company: Marketecture Media, Inc
- Country: United States
- Based in: New York
- Language: English
- Website: adland.tv

Adland is a website focusing on the advertising industry and an Internet archive of commercials. Adland incorporates advertising news, critical commentary on ads and the advertising industry, and archives of ads and ad campaigns, concentrating on television advertisements. In 2003, Variety described Adland as a "center for ad-related news and discussion." The website also hosts ads which have been banned or censored elsewhere. Adland also has a Twitter presence with nearly 80,000 followers. On January 24, 2025, the founder of the site, Åsk Wäppling, announced a shut-down due to personal reasons. As of March 24, 2025, the website changed into a white background saying "This site is private" with a form to enter a password. On April 24, 2025, the acquisition and revival of the site was announced by the new owner, Marketecture Media, a business-to-business media company founded by former advertising executive Ari Paparo.

== History ==
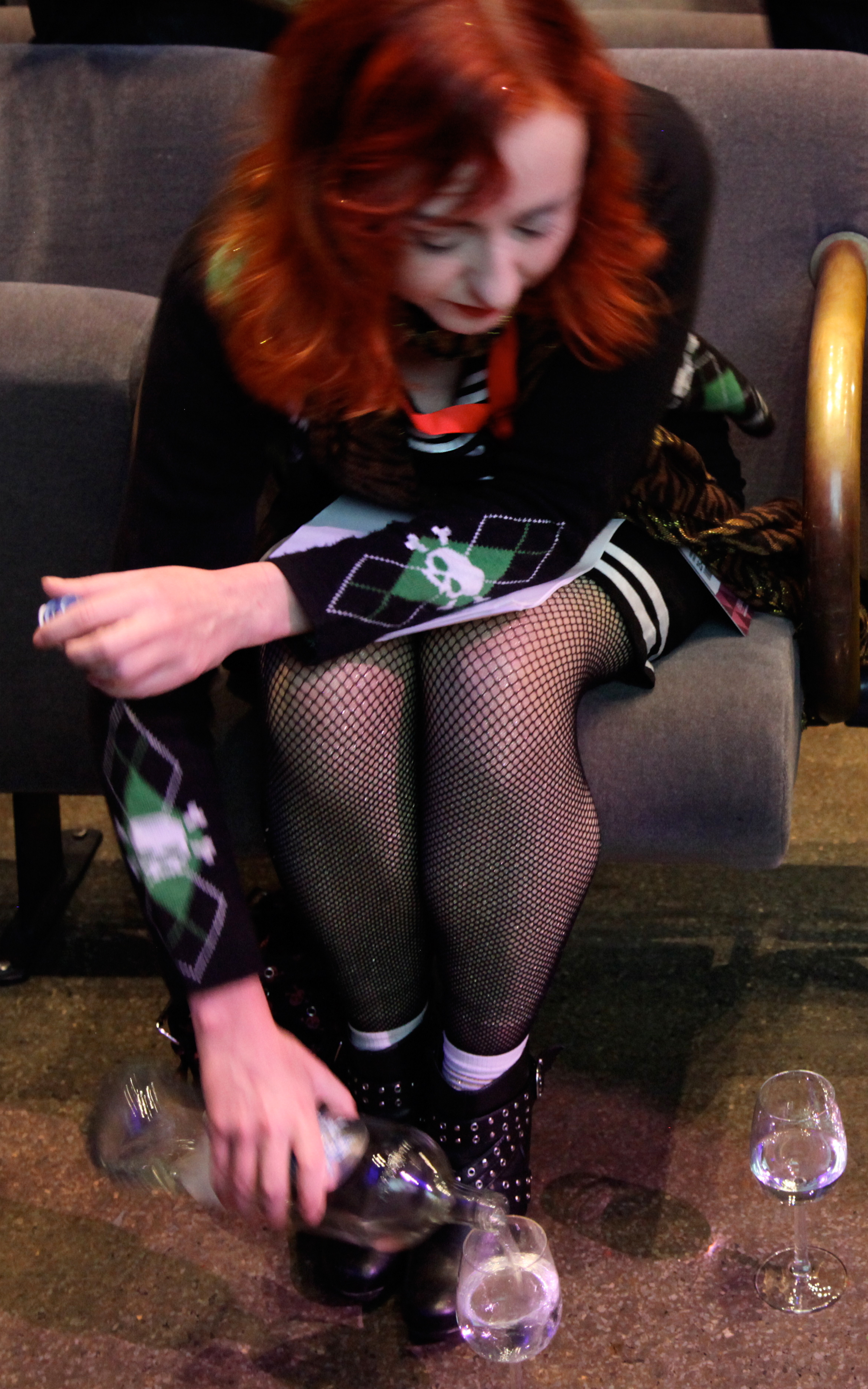
Adland creator Åsk Wäppling at the Eurobest awards.

Adland was founded by Åsk Wäppling in 1996, who uses the pen name Dabitch on the site. According to Wäppling, "we preserve, we publish, we deliver, we review and sometimes harass all advertising there is." Adland began as a place to collect plagiarized ads under the title Badland, and has grown into the largest archive of commercials in the world. The site also houses an archive of over fifty years of Super Bowl commercials. Wäppling describes Adland's earliest incarnation as a "proto-blog", inspired by her discussion of advertising on Usenet and on a mailing list she created. In 2000, Badland was rebranded as Adland. Initially, the site used a subscription model for access to its commercial archive, later moving to an ad-supported revenue model, and then to a donation-supported site. The new owners have introduced a pay-for-submission model while keeping the site free for users. Åsk Wäppling's interest in media and journalism was sparked via an elective in junior high, and she regularly writes for several other advertising trades other than Adland.

=== Death threats ===
During the 2008 Summer Olympics in Beijing, Adland defended—and hosted copies of—ads produced by the Swedish Red Cross Youth, which used the iconography of the games and were designed to draw attention to claims of human rights abuses by the Nepalese military. The International Federation of Red Cross and Red Crescent Societies forced those ads to be withdrawn from the web, but Adland continued to host copies. Wäppling stated that she had received death threats and harassment over Adland's refusal to remove the ads, and that Adland had been subjected to denial-of-service attacks over the issue. The Red Cross Youth stated that "the result of our campaign shows that it is more important than ever to discuss the consequences of human rights violations".

=== Google AdSense bans ===
In February 2011, Adland was banned from Google AdSense after a picture from a Sloggi lingerie ad (included in a post by Åsk Wäppling on sexist advertising) was held to be inappropriate by Google. Wäppling described the ban as a case of "American puritanism". However, issues with Google were to recur. Adland was reinstated, then banned again over the display of ads from another lingerie campaign in January 2012, then reinstated once more, and finally banned for good by Google in December 2012 over images of ads from PETA used in an Adland post critical of the controversial animal rights group's advertising.

=== Adland on Tor ===
In January 2016, Adland became the first advertising news site available the Tor Network, designed for anonymous browsing and of the Dark Web. Wäppling describes Adland's .onion mirror as a service to the growing number of Adland readers using adblock software due to concerns over privacy, noting that "The way ad networks are today are basically indistinguishable from malware."

=== Adland taken offline ===
On September 19, 2019, the site was taken offline. Adland's cloud server host Vultr received an email from the lawyer Amy Tindell at Holland & Hart LLP in Boulder, Colorado, United States demanding the removal of a Bridgestone commercial from 2002. The commercial, which titled "A Dog's Life," was created by a team at BBDO in Bangkok, Thailand and won a silver award in the 2003 Asia Pacific Adfest. One of the claims the lawyer made in her email, is that by writing "Bridgestone" in the article about the commercial, Adland is infringing on their trademark. The website had been given 24 hours to "remove the domain" from their host.

Techdirt called it a "bullshit DMCA notice", whilst Åsk Wäppling said she was in talks with the "History of Advertising Trust" regarding eventual takeover. Adpulp asked if 'this mess all caused by lack of communication between parties?' to which Åsk Wäppling responded that it has been 16 years since PR was even involved. When asked why she didn't move the Adland archive to YouTube, she points out that Adland, and this contested commercial, is older than YouTube by several years.

In December 2019, the URL for Adland.tv returned an error message reading "502 Bad Gateway". Åsk Wäppling's personal website, Dabitch.net, also returned the same error message. As of January 2020, Adland.tv had moved to a completely different web server host.

=== Adland in pop culture ===
Adland has created words and expressions that have spread in the advertising industry. Among other things, a comic strip was created with the name "Adgrunts", which is what the members of Adland are called. In 2005, the Danish advertising agency "Lund's Byro" announced a competition to name the agency on Adland. The agency is now called "Maraschino".

== Reviews ==
In 2005, Jena McGregor, writing for FastCompany, said that Adland's "group blog approach generates a more diverse array of insight from registered users". In 2012, Business Insider placed Adland on a list of the 22 most influential advertising blogs. In a 2012 Adweek interview with Wäppling, Tim Nudd wrote that Wäppling and Adland cover the advertising industry with "wit, humor, style and more than a little improvisation". Åsk Wäppling was one of more than one hundred marketing and branding personalities interviewed in Josh Sklar's 2014 book Digital Doesn't Matter.
