= Mark Boidman =

Canadian businessman

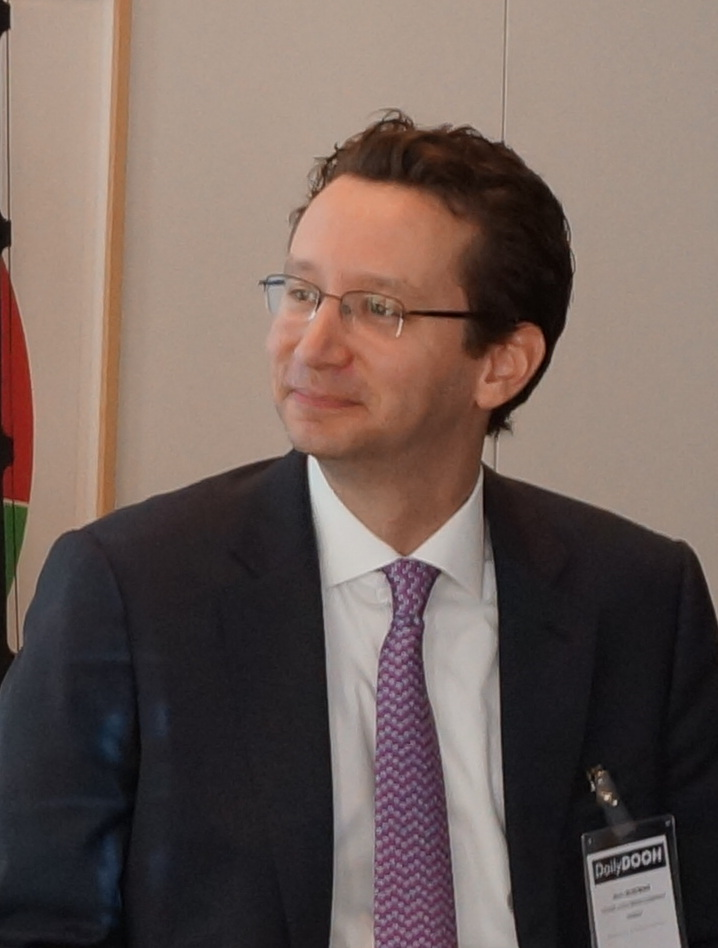

Personal details
- Born: December 28, 1975 (age 50) Montreal, Quebec, Canada
- Occupation: January 2014 – Managing Director at Solomon Partners Director at Digital Signage Federation Member of the Advisory Board at Gimbal, Inc. Member of New York State Bar and Massachusetts State Bar

Mark Boidman is a Media and Tech investment banker and attorney at law, specializing in mergers and acquisitions. He advises companies across Media and Entertainment sectors, including digital media and marketing, retail technology, Pro AV and enterprise software/tech, on M&A and financing transactions.

His notable clients include Netflix, Outfront Media, AMI Entertainment, Clear Channel Outdoor, Exterion Media, JCDecaux, Mood Media, RMG Networks, Titan, ACON Investments, Ares Management, Cox Enterprises, DirecTV, Discovery Communications, Disney, General Atlantic, GI Partners, H.I.G. Capital, KKR, Liberty Media, Lionsgate Entertainment, Mediacom Communications, Providence Equity, RevZilla, Scripps Networks, Searchlight Capital, and TiVo. He also serves as an advisor to Bloomberg.

== Career ==
In 2000, Boidman joined Paul, Weiss, Rifkind, Wharton & Garrison law firm in New York City, where he practiced law in the Internet, Media, and Technology Mergers and Acquisitions Group. He also served on the law firm's public matters and hiring committees and was elected to its associates committee.

In 2004, Boidman joined Barclays Capital (originally Lehman Brothers) as head of Out-of-Home Advertising (DOOH), TV Broadcasting, and Radio Coverage in its Global Technology, Media and Telecom branch and senior member of the firm’s Defense/Activism team. During his time at Barclays Capital, he served as advisor to Lionsgate for its acquisition of Summit Entertainment, Van Wagner for the acquisition of Fuel Outdoor, TicketMonster for its sale to Living Social, and Discovery Communications for its acquisitions of HowStuffWorks and Convex Group. Boidman executed more than $40 billion in overall transactions between 2004 and 2012. He departed Barclays Capital in early 2013.

In May 2013, Boidman joined Solomon Partners as Director in the Media, Entertainment, Communications and Technology Advisory Practice and became managing director in 2014. Boidman became Head of Solomon’s Media & Entertainment Group in 2022.

In October 2014, Boidman served as financial advisor for the acquisition of Van Wagner Communications’ major market advertising business by CBS Outdoor Americas. The deal was valued as USD$690 million and resulted in CBS Outdoor acquiring approximately 1,100 large format billboard displays in a total of 11 US markets. He was a keynote speaker at the 2014 Digital Signage Expo in Las Vegas, Nevada. Additionally, Boidman was elected to the board of directors of the Digital Signage Federation that same year.

In February 2015, Boidman was appointed Member of the Advisory Board at Gimbal, Inc., a geofencing and digital beacon technological company. In May, Boidman was one of seven featured speakers at the 2015 OAAA-TAB National Convention + Expo in San Diego, alongside author Malcolm Gladwell. Boidman made specific recommendations to the attendees, including using technology to demonstrate ROI of OOH advertising and creating an open structure data management platform that would involve using data to target audiences. In June 2015, Boidman was recognized as a “40 Under Forty” honoree by the National Association of Certified Valuators and Analysts (NACVA) and the Consultants' Training Institute (CTI). He was named “Investment Banking MD of the Year” by Corporate Vision’s 2015 Executive Awards in November. In December 2015, Boidman was awarded “Deal Maker of the Year” by Business Worldwide Magazine. He also appeared at the 2015 International Consumer Electronics Show (CES), where he presented on emerging Digital Out-of-Home technologies and discussed the relationship between digital media, technology, and valuing content.

In 2018, Boidman, along with Goldman Sachs, advised Exterion Media in its sale to Global.

== Personal life ==
Boidman received joint LL.B and Bachelor of Civil Law degrees from McGill University in 2000. During his final year at McGill University, he clerked for the Superior Court of Quebec. Before law school, he studied business at McGill's Faculty of Management. He was a recipient of the J.W. McConnell Scholarship.

Himself being a cancer survivor, he co-founded "AntiOX In-A-Box" in 2007. The e-commerce company is dedicated to promoting antioxidant snacks, products, and healthy habits for cancer patients. Part of the annual profits are donated to universities researching the health effects of antioxidants.

He is a member of the New York and Massachusetts State Bars.

== Published works ==
Boidman is also a published author. His article "Out-of-Home Media as the Gateway to Mobile Commerce and Retargeting" was published in February 2014 in the Journal of Retail Analytics, a quarterly publication by Platt Retail Institute, LLC. In this article, he addressed the role of new technology in delivering more capable and cost-effective DOOH media platforms to bridge the digital/mobile commerce gap.

In 2018, his book titled Times Square Everywhere: The Next Wave in the Fast-Changing Media Landscape, in which he discusses the evolution of media and technology, was published. The book was reviewed as a "thought-provoking primer on the out of home media and in-store media worlds."

In 2019, he authored an Audiovisual article titled Holography: A Quantum Leap in the Audiovisual Landscape.

His second book, Digital Sign Language: How to Thrive in the New Era of Pro AV and Out of Home Media, exploring the current state of the Pro AV and Out of Home media sectors in today's digital market, was released in the second half of 2023.
