= Preferred partnership =

A preferred partner agreement normally refers to an agreement between a vendor (service provider) and those who are allowed to on-sell its products. In line with this agreement there are normally some prerequisites that the partner must meet to become a preferred partner. These prerequisites may include things like:

- Training and certification
- Minimum sales volume and/or value

Being a preferred partner provides pre-determined discounts, advantages and privileges from the vendor to the partner.
