= Sabo (street artist) =

American street artist (born 1968)

- Born: 1968 (age 57–58)
- Education: ArtCenter College of Design

Sabo (born 1968) is the pseudonym of a street artist formerly active in Los Angeles, California. His name derives from sabot, a weapon most commonly used in firearm or cannon ammunition. According to a 2015 interview with Adland, Sabo had been involved in street art since 1999, though he began to take his activity in the scene more seriously around 2008. Sabo's works have been critical of left-wing politics (and its prominence in the entertainment industry) and America's Democratic Party, claiming that "leftism is a mental disorder."

== Notable works ==
Sabo's first work that received mainstream attention was in May 2014, where he put up posters attacking Democratic politician and then-candidate for governor of Texas Wendy Davis, who held a thirteen-hour-long filibuster to block Senate Bill 5 (a measure which included more restrictive abortion regulations for Texas) a year prior. The posters feature mostly-naked Barbie dolls with a plastic baby in their belly areas and Davis' face plastered on, with the caption: "Hollywood welcomes Abortion Barbie Wendy Davis."

During the 2016 Republican National Convention in Cleveland, Ohio, Sabo targeted Hillary Clinton and the Democratic Party with posters (most of which were themed to Hillary's America: The Secret History of the Democratic Party, a 2016 political docudrama created by American conservative pundit Dinesh D'Souza) being placed at local bus stops.

In December 2017, Sabo claimed credit for putting up posters (heavily derivative of works by the artist Barbara Kruger) of actress Meryl Streep with producer Harvey Weinstein with the words "She knew" emblazoned across Streep's face, a reference to rumors that Streep had been aware that Weinstein was a serial sexual predator before the information became public. He said that he considered it retribution for Streep's role in the film The Post because he believed the film was a direct attack on Donald Trump.

Several days before the 75th Golden Globe Awards in January 2018, Sabo put up road signs around the Beverly Hills neighborhood of Los Angeles that referenced claims of child sexual abuse in the entertainment industry. In a similar stunt committed days before the 90th Academy Awards, Sabo vandalized three billboards in the Hollywood area (in a reference to nominee Three Billboards Outside Ebbing, Missouri) that not only criticized celebrity-led movements like Time's Up and #MeToo, but also claimed that the entertainment industry shielded pedophiles within their ranks, and claimed that the industry was hypocritical for handling sex abuse scandals.

Later that year, Sabo vandalized a billboard near Television City promoting the CBS series Young Sheldon into an attack on comedian Sacha Baron Cohen and Who Is America?, a Showtime television series created by Baron Cohen; Showtime is also a subsidiary of the CBS Corporation. He mocked up an image of Baron Cohen as a wounded war veteran, referencing a character he portrayed in an episode of the series, in relation to Sarah Palin's comments about the show; Palin had claimed that Baron Cohen had interviewed her in disguise and disrespected the U.S. military by being a military impostor. A similar mock advertisement for Who Is America? was found at a bus stop down the street in Fairfax Avenue, which also promoted the Wounded Warrior Project.

In October 2018, Sabo vandalized a billboard promoting the 2018 Halloween film, which placed the face of Maxine Waters, a Democratic member of the U.S. House of Representatives, on Michael Myers' body, with the hashtag #uncivildemocrats also plastered on. This work was done in response to a statement Waters made encouraging people to confront former President Donald Trump and his Cabinet members regarding their political actions.

Responding to the controversy of the host selection of the 91st Academy Awards, Sabo placed posters around the Dolby Theatre in support of Kevin Hart, who was slated to be the original host of that year's awards ceremony but had to step down due to criticism over homophobic comments and jokes. While Sabo claims that he's a fan of Hart, the intentions behind putting up these posters is to "make a point about the industry's intolerance toward those it deems politically incorrect."

In February 2019, Sabo placed mock advertisements that lampooned Jussie Smollett and the controversy of Smollett staging a hate crime against himself and making a false police report. The mock advertisements make reference to the 2018 films Black Panther and BlacKkKlansman, in which Sabo uses the quote "This is MAGA Country"—the phrase Smollett told police that the perpetrators uttered—in one of the mock posters.

In July 2019, he vandalized various advertisements for the Quentin Tarantino film Once Upon a Time in Hollywood. In a billboard located a block away from La Cienega Boulevard, for example, the title of the film was changed to Once Upon a Time in Pedowood, and the faces of the film's lead actors, Leonardo DiCaprio and Brad Pitt, were changed to those of convicted child sex offenders Jeffrey Epstein and Roman Polanski. Another advertisement for the film was vandalized with the face of Pitt replaced with Woody Allen.

In the 2021 California election to recall Governor Gavin Newsom, Sabo produced several posters opposing Newsom and supporting right-wing talk show host Larry Elder.

== Personal life ==
Before his career as a street artist, Sabo was enlisted in the United States Marine Corps. He studied at the ArtCenter College of Design in Pasadena, California.

In an interview with conservative newspaper The Washington Times, Sabo identified as mixed race. In a New York Times interview he said his father is Mexican.
