= Captivate Network =

Elevator and lobby advertising company

Captivate is a digital media company with a network of 20,755 high-resolution, flat-panel elevator and lobby displays in 7,155 premier office buildings across North America. Published in two countries and two languages, the network spans over 31 metro areas or Designated Market Areas across the United States and Canada with a combined unique audience of 11.3 million viewers each month.

Captivate employs a team of editors who customize business, news, sports and lifestyle content, in real time for the specific audience the network serves and the short form writing appropriate for its digital screens. Captivate is a 13-time recipient of B2B Magazine's Media Power 50 Award.

The editors source content from over 100 providers – such as The Wall Street Journal, Associated Press, USA Today, The Washington Post, Business Insider, The Atlantic, The Canadian Press as well as its own original content to engage and inform tenants in premier commercial real estate buildings.

The New York–based company serves corporate, advertising and real estate customers. Captivate has offices in Greater Boston, New York City, Chicago, Los Angeles and Toronto.

== History ==
The idea for Captivate came during an elevator ride when Mike DiFranza recognized people’s uneasiness in crowded elevators, and decided to provide video media for them to watch. He started the company with co-founders Todd Newville and Ray Pineau in October 1997, with its first installation at Boston’s Seaport Hotel a year later in October 1998.

In March 2001, Captivate merged with its competitor – Toronto, Ontario–based Elevator News Network (ENN) – to form the largest elevator media network company. ENN continued to operate in Canada under its own name until November 2001, when it changed its name to Captivate to establish a unified brand across North America.

Gannett Co., Inc. acquired the assets of Captivate Network in April 2004. In September 2013, Gannett announced Captivate would be a separate corporate structure co-owned by Generation Partners and Gannett, allowing for private funding to facilitate more rapid growth. Veteran media executive Mark Shapiro was named as Chairman of the Board and Marc Kidd was named CEO.

In April 2022, Captivate partnered with Neustar to integrate Neustar's Element One identity resolution platform, using both first- and third-party data to improve audience segmentation and targeting.

== Market ==
Captivate’s at-work news and advertising network is a segment of the digital out of home (DOOH) market, which is essentially any type of digital advertising that reaches the consumer while he or she is outside the home. According to the Digital Out-of-Home Media Forecast 2008-2012 from PQ Media, the U.S. DOOH media industry – which includes video ad networks, digital signage and ambient ad platforms – was a $2.43 billion in 2008, with the video advertising segment comprising approximately $1 billion. DOOH also comprises 29.1% of overall out-of-home advertising.

== Membership ==
Captivate Network is a member of: Digital Place–based Advertising Association (DPAA), the not-for-profit pro-industry association formed in early 2007 in order to promote the advancement of on-location video and digital advertising networks.
