= Outdoor Media Association =

The Outdoor Media Association (OMA) is the national industry body that represents most of Australia's Out-of-Home (OOH) media display companies and production facilities, as well as some media display asset owners. It was first incorporated in 1939.

== History ==
The Outdoor Media Association operates nationally and prior to July 2005, traded as the Outdoor Advertising Association of Australia (OAAA). The association was created to; track audience measurement through MOVE; promote and endorse the Out-of-Home advertising medium through marketing initiatives; conduct research; maintain government and media relations; lobby policy and regulation; provide member services and revenue reporting.

MOVE (Measurement of Outdoor Visibility and Exposure) is Australia's first national Out-of-Home (OOH) audience measurement system. MOVE is managed and administered by MOVE Pty Ltd.

In 2010, Charmaine Moldrich was appointed as the CEO of the OMA and MOVE.

== Board of directors ==
The OMA is governed by a board of directors that is elected by the OMA members. This is in accordance with the Constitution of the Outdoor Media Association. Members of the board in 2018 include Steve O'Connor (Chairman), CEO JCDecaux; James Warburton, CEO APN Outdoor; Mike Tyquin, CEO Adshel; Kirsty Dollisson, managing director TorchMedia; Brendon Cook, CEO oOh!media; Chris Tyquin, Joint managing director goa Billboards; John O’Neill, CEO QMS Australia and Chris Bregenhoj, Chairman MOOH Media Pty Ltd.

There are three categories of OMA memberships:

- Media Display Members- Outdoor Media companies
- Non-media Display Members- Production and Installation companies
- Asset Owners- Property Owners

Members of the OMA benefit from the lobbying and advocacy that the OMA conducts on regulatory and assessment issues. Other opportunities include participation in discussions and meetings on legislative and regulatory issues; the development of industry standards and guidelines; the development of custom research to advance the industry; The Media Federation of Australia (MFA) and the Australian Association of National Advertisers (AANA) accredited audience measurement system for the Out-of-Home industry- MOVE.

== MOVE ==
MOVE (Measurement of Outdoor Visibility and Exposure) is a planning and buying measurement tool which has been endorsed by the Media Federation of Australia (MFA) and the Australian Association of National Advertisers (AANA).

== Regulation ==
The OMA works with the Advertising Standards Bureau (Australia) (ASB), the Australian Association of National Advertisers (AANA), The Communications Council, and the Media Federation of Australia (MFA).

== Codes ==
The OMA members are governed by the OMA Code of Ethics, Australian Association of National Advertisers (AANA) Code of Ethics, AANA Environmental Claims in Advertising and Marketing Code, AANA Code for Advertising and Marketing Communications for Children, AANA Food and Beverages Advertising and Marketing Communications Code, AANA Quick Service Restaurant Initiative, The Alcohol Beverages Advertising Code (ABAC), The Federal Chamber of Automotive Industries Voluntary Code of Practice for Motor Vehicle Advertising, The Therapeutic Goods Advertising Code, The Weight Management Industry Code of Practice.

== Affiliates ==
The OMA works closely with its International Affiliates the Outdoor Media Centre UK, the Outdoor Media Association of Canada and the Outdoor Advertising Association of America.

== OPEN ==
In 2012, the Outdoor Media Association (OMA) launched OPEN, a book that represents creativity and opinion on a variety of Out-of-Home (OOH) campaigns, locally and internationally. The focus of content is primarily OOH, while also looking more broadly at advertising's influence on the world and the role creativity plays in it. Contributors to OPEN include Stephen Banham of Letterbox Design, Adam Ferrier of Naked Communications, Sudeep Gohil of Droga5 and Micah Walker of The Monkeys, whilst the books foreword is by Todd Sampson of Leo Burnett Australia.

== OPEN² ==
The second edition, OPEN², was launched in November 2014 by the OMA and features four (4) chapters: Humour me; Sell me something; Tell me a story; and Interact with me.

Commenting on how OOH is increasingly becoming reflective of our culture and society, CEO of the OMA, Charmaine Moldrich stated, "OPEN² continues the conversation we started with our first book OPEN in 2012. It presents the endless creative opportunities we know Outdoor offers while providing the reader with creative and strategic insights from some of the leaders in the industry."

The contributors to OPEN² include Dr Rebecca Huntley, Executive Director Ipsos Australia; Fiona Jolly, CEO Advertising Standards Bureau (Australia); Nigel Marsh, Chairman The Leading Edge; Jane Caro; Ben Colman, CEO 18 Feet & Rising; Ben Coulson, CCO GPY&R ANZ; Andy Lark, CEO Group Lark; Rob Atkinson, CEO Adshel; Ben Walsh, ECD M&C Saatchi; John Purcell, Commercial Director oOh! Media; Leo Roberts, Group Marketing Manager Coca-Cola South Pacific; and Luke Chess, Creative Director MJW Australia.

== OPEN^{3} ==
OPEN^{3} is the third edition in the OPEN series and takes a retrospective and a prospective look at OOH advertising. Featuring a variety of standout Outdoor campaigns from around the globe, OPEN^{3} is more than just a collection of images – it also features opinions and experiences about advertising and creativity, crafted by a league of world-wide advertising industry leaders.
