= DefCom Australia =

DefCom Australia is a loyalty card and purchasing scheme designed specifically for regular and full-time Reserve members of the Australian Defence Force. The program also extends eligibility to "Protector" organizations, including firefighters, ambulance workers, and emergency response personnel such as the Wireless Institute of Australia's emergency response amateur radio teams.

Additionally, access to the scheme may be available to Defence civilian staff and family members of eligible personnel, though a fee may apply for these categories. Similar groups of people with related service backgrounds may also qualify for membership.

== History ==
The Government of Australia established the scheme instead of establishing an organisation similar to the United States' Base/Post exchange shops. The Defence Force Discount Buying Scheme commenced operations in April 1990. Known as the Defence Force Privilege Card scheme, it was developed by Defcom Pty. Ltd. (private enterprise) and is designed to give ADF members, their families and former members of the ADF the opportunity to buy a wide range of goods and services at discount rates. Later, the organisations and people participating as members was opened up to 'protector' organisations.

== Scheme ==
DefCom establishes discount relationships with franchise groups and individual businesses in areas of high concentration of Defence and similar personnel.

Members use an annually issued directory, or the scheme web site, to find a participating business selling the item they require.

The member presents the membership card at the time of purchase and claims the discount. Haggling may follow this.

=== Merchandise and services ===
Merchandise offered includes:

- Accommodation
- Cars — New & Used
- Credit Cards (MasterCard and Visa card)
- Holidays
- Finance and Investment services
- Leisure & Theme Parks
- Merchants — Local Traders in each area, State and National Companies, Online marketing
- Wine club

== See also ==
- Department of Defence (Australia)
- Base exchange
