= DSF Europe =

European trade association

- Founded: 2008; 18 years ago
- Type: Non-profit
- Purpose: Digital Signage, Digital Out-of-home advertising
- Location: Munich, Germany
- Region served: Europe, MENA
- Method: Membership
- Website: ovab.eu

DSF Europe is a European trade association founded in November 2008. It is an independent affiliate of the US-based Digital Signage Federation (DSF). It seeks to unify digital signage industry advocacy and was founded to promote digital out-of-home communication as an advertising medium. DSF Europe administration offices are based in Munich, Germany.

== History ==
DSF Europe was founded on November 13, 2008 as the Out-of-home Video Advertising Bureau, Europe (OVAB Europe). This was originally as an offshoot of the US-based Out-of-home Video Advertising Bureau, a trade association, which has since changed its name to the Digital Place-based Advertising Association (DPAA).

The founding board members consisted of president Dirk Huelsermann, vice-chairman Ronni Guggenheim and vice-president and treasurer Richard Malley.

The original launch of the association (as OVAB Europe) in 2008 came at a time when the digital out-of-home advertising market was predicted to expand rapidly in Europe, with some large global outdoor media network owners, such as JCDecaux and Clear Channel, already investing in the market.

=== Recent Events ===
OVAB Europe announced its affiliation with the DSF in February 2016, and changed its name to DSF Europe. The tie-up between the two associations was brokered by OVAB Europe president, Dirk Huelsermann and the DSF’s 2015 immediate past chair, Ken Goldberg. The stated intention is to unify digital signage industry advocacy around the world.

DSF Europe will still maintain its independence, controlling its own budget and agenda, and will have a seat on the board of the DSF.

The current board members are listed as:

- Founder and President: Dirk Huelsermann (NEC / VUKUNET)
- Vice President: Winfried Karst (Silverflow Media)
- Treasurer: Markus Deserno (Seen Media)
- General Secretary: Florian Rotberg (invidis consulting)

== Membership ==
The following companies were founding members of the bureau:

- Neo Advertising
- invidis consulting
- ECE Flatmedia
- IBM Deutschland
- Philips
- NEC Display Solutions
- Minicom Advanced Systems Ltd

Its membership has since expanded to over twenty member companies.

In 2011 OVAB Europe widened its intended membership base to include the MENA region. The first member from that region was reported as being the Abu Dhabi Media Company.

== Standards ==
OVAB Europe and its members have collaborated to create a number of standards related to the digital out-of-home and digital signage industries. These have been made public, along with new standards drafts available for public scrutiny.

At the Integrated Systems Europe trade show event in 2010, the OVAB Europe stand was used to promote the adoption of industry standards.

== Research ==
In 2009, OVAB Europe launched the DOOH Business Climate Index (DBCI), which is designed to be a benchmark assessment of the sector across several European countries. Selected participants evaluate their current economic situation and anticipated development in the following six months. The results are used to produce an overall index number, planned to be updated each quarter of the year.

The DBCI is currently produced bi-monthly, and covers 75% of the EMEA public display market. It is produced for OVAB Europe by member company invidis consulting.
