= Mark Shapiro (media executive) =

American television & media executive (born 1970)

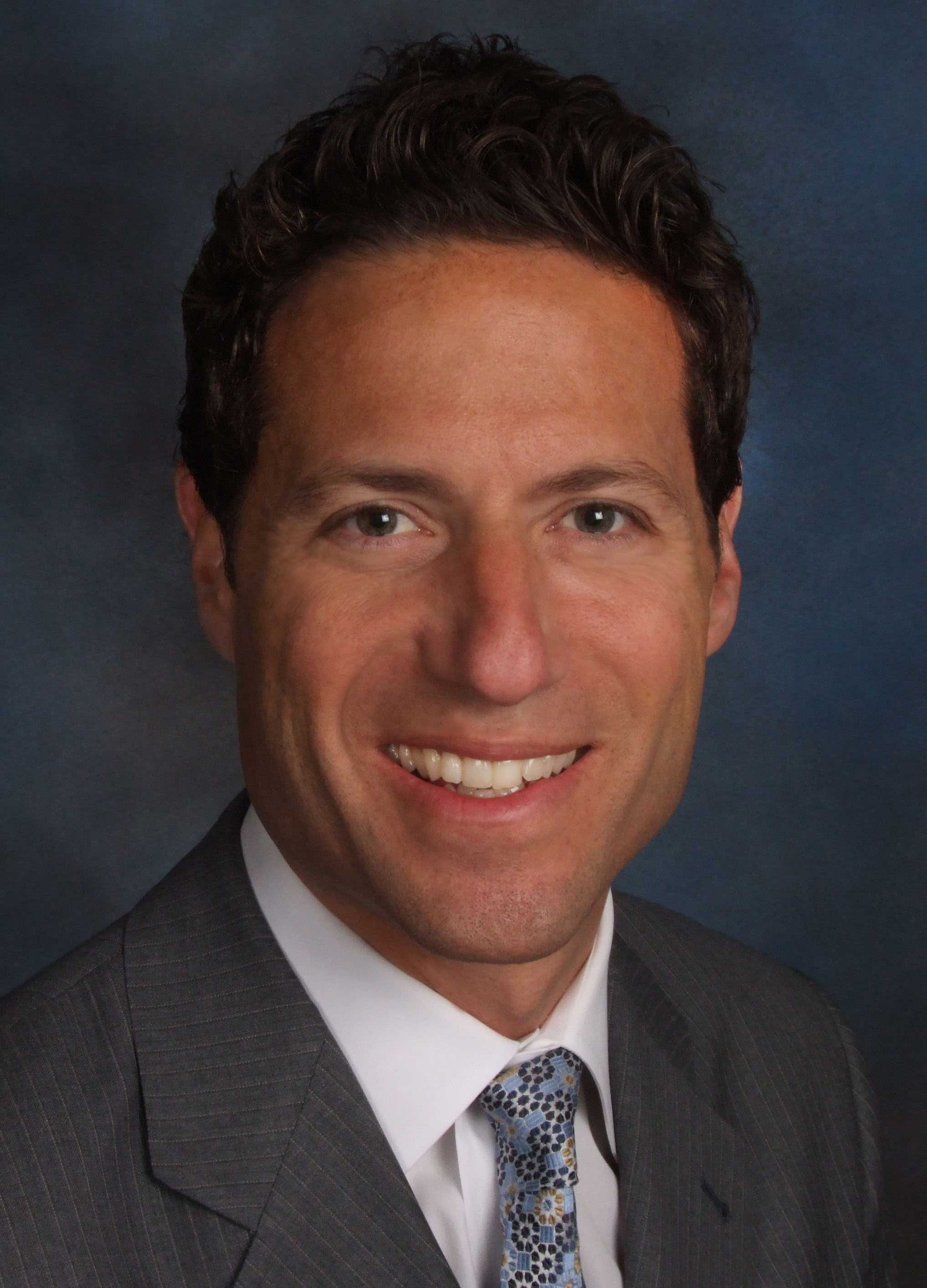
- Shapiro in 2012
- Born: 1970 (age 55–56); Glenview, Illinois, U.S.
- Education: University of Iowa (BA)
- Occupations: Television and media executive
- Years active: 1993–present
- Employer(s): WME Group; TKO
- Known for: Executive positions at ESPN and Six Flags
- Title: President, managing partner, WME Group; COO, TKO
- Spouse: Kim Shapiro
- Awards: Peabody Award and Sports Emmy Award

Mark Shapiro (born 1970) is an American television and media executive. He is the president and managing partner of WME Group and president and COO of TKO Holdings, Inc. He is the chairman of Captivate Network; a minority owner of the Los Angeles Football Club and the Las Vegas Raiders; and co-founder of MARI events company.

He was president of Endeavor, from 2018, and its COO, from 2023 to 2025. Prior, he was an executive vice-president for programming and production and an executive producer at ESPN, before becoming CEO and president of Six Flags, Inc. He is also a former CEO and executive producer of Dick Clark Productions.

== Early life and education ==
Shapiro was raised in Glenview, Illinois, the eldest child of Judith and Harold Shapiro, where he graduated from Glenbrook South High School. He was exposed to the media industry at an early age after his parents divorced and he flew occasionally to New York City where his mother worked for Time Magazine. In 1992, he graduated with a B.A. in communication studies from the University of Iowa. He was a member of the Sigma Chi fraternity. During college, he interned for NBC Sports and then at a CBS affiliate in Cedar Rapids.

== Career ==
=== Early years and ESPN (1993–2005) ===
In 1993, he accepted a position as a production assistant at ESPN. He was responsible for the production of the documentary, SportsCentury, a comprehensive retrospective of the people and events that shaped the face of sports in North America over the past 100 years. Between 1997 and 1999, Shapiro was the executive producer of the series, which received an Emmy and Peabody Award as well as an Excellence in Sports Journalism Award from the Northeastern University's Center for the Study of Sport in Society.

Shapiro became senior vice president and general manager of programming in 2001 and then executive vice president for programming and production in 2002. In 2003, Entertainment Weekly named Shapiro one of 2003's rising stars in entertainment. He secured new properties for ESPN and acquired rights to Monday Night Football, Wimbledon and the NBA. Beginning in 2002, ratings on ESPN rose for 10 straight quarters.

He was the executive producer for Tilt, Dream Job, and Playmakers. Playmakers was awarded a 2003 American Film Institute award for TV Program of the Year, and the GLAAD Media Award for Outstanding Drama Series in 2004.

During his tenure, the network was awarded a number of Emmy awards and an additional Peabody. He was also the recipient of the UJA-Federation of New York 2005 Sports for Youth Award and in 2006 he was again honored by the federation in the Broadcast Cable category. Shapiro was named to the Sports Business Daily 40 under 40 Hall of Fame in 2005 after being named to the list in 2002, 2003, and 2004.

=== Six Flags and media roles (2005–2012) ===
Shapiro left his position of executive vice president of programming and production at ESPN in May 2005. From October to December 2005, Shapiro was the CEO of Red Zone LLC as the company pushed for control over Six Flags. Once Red Zone solidified control over the company, Shapiro became director, president, and chief executive officer of Six Flags, with a tenure lasting from August 2005 until May 2010. Red Zone LLC was founded and controlled by former Washington Commanders owner, Daniel Snyder. Six Flags tenure was marked by a decision to market the theme parks to children and families instead of just targeting teenagers and young adults as the parks had attracted in the past.

After joining in 2008, he resigned along with other Endeavor executives from the Live Nation board in June 2021 after the US Department of Justice raised antitrust concerns.

Shapiro became chief executive officer and an executive producer of Dick Clark Productions in May 2010. While there, he was involved with the expansion of the company's programming format. Shapiro left the position of CEO soon after the sale of the company to Guggenheim Partners in 2012.

=== WME-IMG, Endeavor, WME Group and TKO ===
After working as an advisor for Silver Lake Partners and William Morris Endeavor (WME) during the latter's acquisition of IMG; Shapiro's role was made permanent, becoming chief content officer in 2014. He was named by Variety to its New Power of New York Power List. In November 2016, he became co-president of WME-IMG, before becoming president of the fully integrated company under the Endeavor name, in 2018.

He was the executive producer of the HBO series, Being Serena which was honored with a Producers Guild Award for Outstanding Sports Program.

Shapiro was named president and COO of TKO Holdings, created by a combination of UFC and WWE, in 2023.

=== Other ventures ===
Shapiro is a co-owner of the Los Angeles FC Major League Soccer franchise.

He acquired a personal minority ownership stake in the Las Vegas Raiders NFL team in 2026, as did TKO and WME Group executive chairman Ari Emanuel. The two are also principal investors in MARI, an international events company that acquired Frieze and several tennis tournaments, among other enterprises. Shapiro and Emanuel, along with basketball agent Bill Duffy, also own WME Basketball.

He is a member of the board of directors of Fifth Season, and is the chairman of Captivate Network.

== Personal life ==
Shapiro is married to Kim Shapiro, a Lexington, Kentucky, native whom he met just after graduating from college; the couple have three sons together.
