= Discounts and allowances =

Reductions applied to the basic sale price of goods or services

Discounts are reductions applied to the basic sale price of goods or services. Allowances against price may have a similar effect.

Discounting practices operate within both business-to-business and business-to-consumer contexts. Discounts can occur anywhere in the distribution channel, modifying either the manufacturer's list price (determined by the manufacturer and often printed on the package), the retail price (set by the retailer and often attached to the product with a sticker), or a quoted price specific to a potential buyer, often given in written form.

There are many purposes for discounting, including to increase short-term sales, to move out-of-date stock, to reward valuable customers, to encourage distribution channel members to perform a function, or to otherwise reward behaviors that benefit the discount issuer. Some discounts and allowances are forms of sales promotion. Many are price discrimination methods that allow the seller to capture some of the consumer surplus.

== Dealing with payment ==
=== Trade discounts ===
Trade discounts are deductions against the list price or catalogue price which are charged by a wholesaler or manufacturer to a retailer or supplier who then deals with the end customer. The discount then enables the retailer to charge the end customer the list price and cover its own costs/profit.

=== Prompt payment discount ===
Cash discounts are reductions in price given to the debtor to motivate the debtor to make payment within specified time. These discounts are intended to speed payment and thereby provide cash flow to the firm. They are sometimes used as a promotional device. A UK survey undertaken by the British Chambers of Commerce found that 13% of UK businesses offered prompt payment discounts (PPDs).

==== Examples ====
- 2/10 net 30 - this means the buyer must pay within 30 days of the invoice date, but will receive a 2% discount if they pay within 10 days of the invoice date.
- 3/7 EOM - this means the buyer will receive a cash discount of 3% if the bill is paid within 7 days after the end of the month indicated on the invoice date. If an invoice is received on or before the 25th day of the month, payment is due on the 7th day of the next calendar month. If a proper invoice is received after the 25th day of the month, payment is due on the 7th day of the second calendar month.
- 3/7 EOM net 30 - this means the buyer must pay within 30 days of the invoice date, but will receive a 3% discount if they pay within 7 days after the end of the month indicated on the invoice date. If an invoice is received on or before the 25th day of the month, payment is due on the 7th day of the next calendar month. If a proper invoice is received after the 25th day of the month, payment is due on the 7th day of the second calendar month.
- 2/15 net 40 ROG - this means the buyer must pay within 40 days of receipt of goods, but will receive a 2% discount if paid in 15 days of the invoice date. (ROG is short for "receipt of goods".)

==== Taxation treatment ====
Before 2014, suppliers in the United Kingdom were permitted to add VAT to the discounted price, even if payment was not made within the discount period and therefore due in full. This provision generated a shortfall in taxation revenue and also meant that UK practices were not in line with the EU's VAT Directive of 2006, which specified that value added tax was to be levied on the actual price paid. Proposals were put forward in the budget of 2014 to amend the UK's taxation law in this respect. In the telecommunications and broadcasting sectors (where there was no obligation to provide a VAT invoice), the law was amended from 1 May 2014, while in other sectors of the economy, the change was effective from 1 April 2015.

=== Preferred payment method discount ===
Some retailers (particularly small retailers with low margins) offer discounts to customers paying with cash, to avoid paying fees on credit card transactions.

=== Partial payment discount ===
Similar to the trade discount, this is used when the seller wishes to improve cash flow or liquidity, but finds that the buyer typically is unable to meet the desired discount deadline. A partial discount for whatever payment the buyer makes helps the seller's cash flow partially.

=== Sliding scale ===
A discount offered based on one's ability to pay. More common with non-profit organizations than with for-profit retail.

=== Forward dating ===
This is where the purchaser doesn’t pay for the goods until well after they arrive. The date on the invoice is moved forward - example: purchase goods in November for sale during the December holiday season, but the payment date on the invoice is January 27.

=== Seasonal discount ===
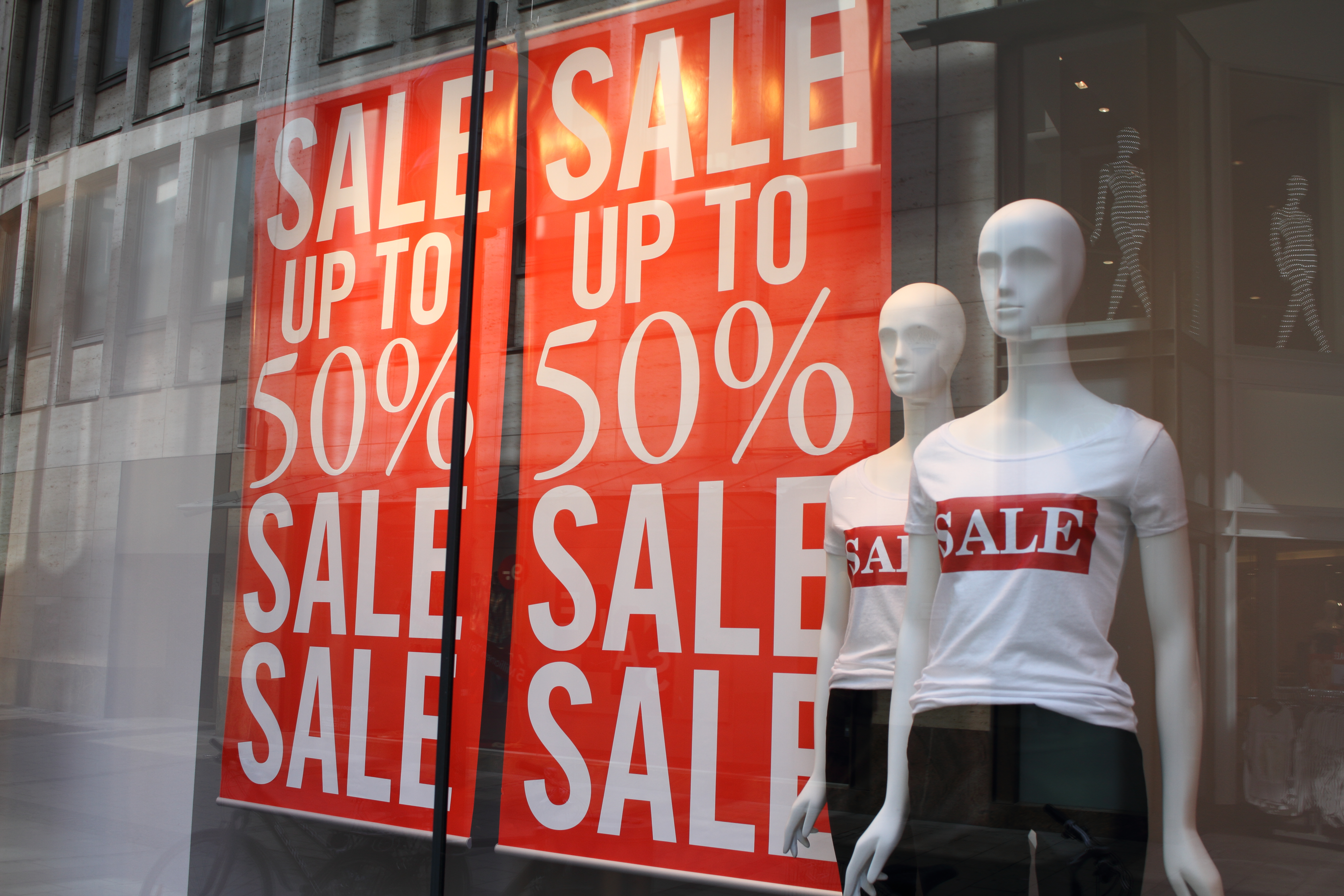
A seasonal sales promotion

These are price reductions given when an order is placed in a slack period (example: purchasing skis in April in the northern hemisphere, or in September in the southern hemisphere). On a shorter time scale, a happy hour may fall in this category. Retailers organize big discounts on almost every season in order to make space for new inventory for the upcoming season.

Generally, this discount is referred to as "X-Dating" or "Ex-Dating". An example of X-Dating would be:

- 3/7 net 30 extra 10 - this means the buyer must pay within 30 days of the invoice date, but will receive a 3% discount if they pay within 7 days after the end of the month indicated on the invoice date plus an extra 10 days.

=== Spaving ===
Spaving (a portmanteau of "spending" and "saving") is a marketing strategy in which consumers are encouraged to spend money to gain access to savings. Spaving offers include free shipping at a certain threshold and "buy one, get one free" deals.

== Dealing with trade ==
=== Bargaining ===
Bargaining is where the seller and the buyer negotiate a price below the original selling price.

=== Trade discount ===
Trade discounts, also called functional discounts, are payments to distribution channel members for performing some function. Examples of these functions are warehousing and shelf stocking. Trade discounts are often combined to include a series of functions, for example 20/12/5 could indicate a 20% discount for warehousing the product, an additional 12% discount for shipping the product, and an additional 5% discount for keeping the shelves stocked. Trade discounts are most frequent in industries where retailers hold the majority of the power in the distribution channel (referred to as channel captains).

Trade discounts are given to try to increase the volume of sales being made by the supplier.

The discount described as trade rate discount is sometimes called "trade discount". Trade discount is the discount allowed on retail price of a product or something. for e.g. Retail price of a cream is 25 and trade discount is 2% on 25.

=== Trade rate discount ===
A trade rate discount, sometimes also called "trade discount", is offered by a seller to a buyer for purposes of trade or reselling, rather than to an end user. For example, a pharmacist might offer a discount for over-the-counter drugs to physicians who are purchasing them for dispensing to the physicians' own patients. A seller supplying both trade or resellers, and the general public will have a general list price for anybody, and will offer a trade discount to bona-fide trade customers.

== Trade-in credit ==
Trade-in credit, also called trade-up credit, is a discount or credit granted for the return of something. The returned item may have little monetary value, as an old version of newer item being bought, or may be worth reselling as second-hand. The idea from a seller's viewpoint is to offer some discount but have the buyer showing some "counter action" to earn this special discount. Sellers like this as the discount granted is not just "given for free" and makes future price/value negotiations easier. Buyers have the advantage of getting some value for something no longer used. Examples can be found in many industries.

== Dealing with quantity ==
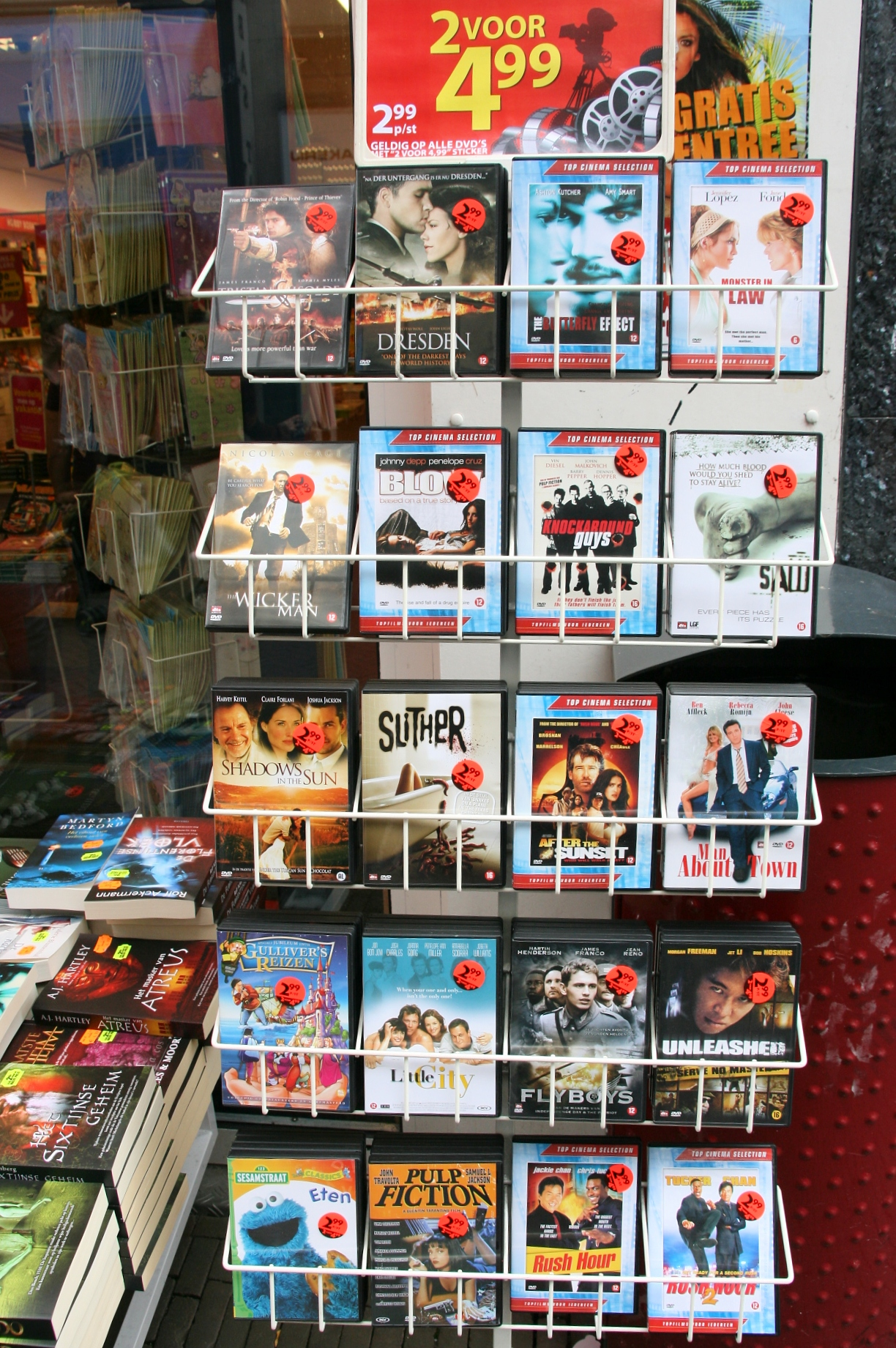
DVD films sold at a discount when 2 items are purchased

These are price reductions given for bulk purchasing. The rationale behind them is to obtain economies of scale and pass some (or all) of these savings on to the customer. In some industries, buyer groups and co-operatives have formed to take advantage of these discounts. Iyengar and Jedidi note the popularity of quantity discounts being offered to both business purchasers and consumers. Generally there are two types:

=== Cumulative quantity discount ===
Cumulative quantity discounts, also called accumulation discounts, are price reductions based on the quantity purchased over a set period of time. The seller's expectation is that they will impose an implied switching cost and thereby bond the purchaser to the seller.

=== Non-cumulative quantity discount ===
These are price reductions based on the quantity of a single order. The seller's expectation is that they will encourage larger orders, thus reducing billing, order filling, shipping, and sales personnel expenses.

If a purchaser has to buy more than they need to secure a discount, we can distinguish between the surplus just not being used, or the surplus being a nuisance, e.g. because of having to carry a large container.

== Dealing with customer characteristics ==
The following discounts have to do with specific characteristics of the customer.

=== Disability discount ===
A discount offered to customers with what is considered to be a disability.

=== Educational or student discount ===
These are price reductions given to members of educational institutions, usually students but possibly also to educators and to other institution staff. The provider's purpose is to build brand awareness early in a buyer's life, or build product familiarity so that after graduation the holder is likely to buy the same product, for own use or for an employer, at its normal price. Providers also offer student discounts as means of offering a product within the budget of a student, which would otherwise be too expensive, thus gaining extra sales. Students may be able to get discounts on products, services, entertainment, and more. Educational discounts may be given by merchants directly, or via a student discount program. Many brands like Apple, Dell, give exclusive discounts to students on their tech products, so that the students get to learn from the latest technology available making their work lesser. Additionally, travel websites also offer student discounts to help make travel more affordable for students. Some websites may also offer other perks for students, such as free cancellations or additional loyalty points. Students can get discounts not only from tech and travel but also from lifestyle brands.

=== Employee discount ===
A discount offered by a company to employees who buy its products.

In 2005, the American automakers ran an "employee discount" for all customers promotional campaign in order to entice buyers, with some success.

=== Military discount ===
A discount offered to customers who are or were members of a military service. Types of military discounts include discounts for active-duty military, veterans, retired military personnel, and military spouses or dependents. In the United States, military discounts frequently require proof of ID to show eligibility such as a DD Form 214, DD Form 215, or DD Form 217 from any branch of the Armed Forces, TRICARE Cards, Veterans Affairs Cards Uniformed Services Privilege and Identification Cards (USPIC) or other official documentation. Eligibility for military discounts can also be verified online or via mobile by verification companies. In Australia, DefCom Australia is a similar discount card.

=== Age-related discounts ===
==== Toddler discount, child discount, kid discount ====
A discount, or free service, offered to children younger than a certain age, commonly for admission to entertainments and attractions, restaurants, and hotels. There may be a requirement that the child be accompanied by an adult paying full price. Small children often travel free on public transport, and older ones may pay a substantially discounted price; proof of age may be required.

==== Young person's discount ====
Discounts are sometimes offered to young people below a certain age who are neither children nor in education, for example:

- In the UK, 16-25 railcards offer 1/3 discount on rail travel, and other discounts, in exchange for an annual fee
- An Enhanced Partnership in the north east of England offers fares of £1 for a single bus journey for all under 22s on any bus service in the region.

==== Senior discount ====
A discount offered to customers who are above a certain relatively advanced age, typically a round number such as 50, 55, 60, 65, 70, or 75; the exact age varies in different cases. The rationale for a senior discount offered by companies is that the customer is assumed to be retired and living on a limited income, and unlikely to be willing to pay full price; sales at reduced price are better than no sales. Non-commercial organizations may offer concessionary prices as a matter of social policy. Free or reduced-rate travel is often available to older people (see, for example, Freedom Pass).

In the United States, most grocery stores offer senior discounts, starting for those age 50 or older, but most discounts are offered for those over 60.

==== First responder or healthcare worker discount ====
Discounts specially offered to firefighters, ambulance workers, other emergency services personnel, and police officers are called first responder discounts. Hospital staff may sometimes receive discounts as well. In the United Kingdom, the "Blue Light Card" is an example of a discount scheme available to staff working for emergency services, the NHS, social care providers and the armed forces.

=== Special prices offered to friends of the seller ===
A discounted price offered to friends of the salesperson, an attitude which is parodied in the stereotype of a salesman saying "It costs [such-and such], but for you..." In Australia, New Zealand, and the UK, discounts to friends are known as "mates' rates." In French this discount is known as prix d'ami. In Spain this is known as "precio de amigo" in Spanish, or "preu d'amic" in Catalan. In German the term "Freundschaftspreis" is commonly used.

=== Special prices offered to local residents ===
Discounts are common in tourist destinations. In Hawaii, for example, many tourist attractions, hotels, and restaurants charge a deeply discounted price to someone who shows proof that they live in Hawaii; this is known as a "Kama'aina discount," meaning child of the land or a local resident. It may be referred to in Hawaii or elsewhere as a resident discount.

=== Discount card ===
Sometimes a document, typically a plastic card similar to a payment card, is issued as proof of eligibility for discounts. In other cases, existing documents proving status (as student, disabled, resident, etc.) are accepted. Documentation may not be required, for example, for people who are obviously young or old enough to qualify for age-related discounts. In some cases, the card may be issued to anyone who asks.

=== Coupons ===
Coupons are associated with Sunday circulars and help consumers who struggle to make ends meet. A coupon is a discount, either of a certain specified amount or a percentage to the holder of a voucher, usually with certain terms. Commonly, there are restrictions as for other discounts, such as being valid only if a certain quantity is bought or only if the customer is older than a specified age. Today coupons are not only printed in newspapers, and brochures. Coupons are offered to customers at the counter after they have paid for their purchase.

=== Rebates ===
A refund of part or sometimes the full price of the product following purchase, though some rebates are offered at the time of purchase. A particular case is the promise of a refund in full if applied for in a restricted date range some years in the future; the hope is that the promise will lure customers and increase sales, but that the majority will fail to meet the conditions for a valid claim.

=== Promotional allowance ===
Promotional allowances are also known as trade-in allowances. These are price reductions given to the buyer for performing some promotional activity. These include an allowance for creating and maintaining an in-store display or a co-op advertising allowance. Trade-in allowances are most common in the automobile industry, but they are also given for other durable goods.

=== Brokerage allowance ===
From the point of view of the manufacturer, any brokerage fee paid is similar to a promotional allowance. It is usually based on a percentage of the sales generated by the broker.

== See also ==
- Net 30
- Ticket systems
