= Legal advertising =

Advertising by lawyers (attorneys at law) and law firms

Legal advertising is advertising by lawyers (attorneys), solicitors and law firms. Legal marketing is a broader term referring to advertising and other practices, including client relations, social media, and public relations. It's a type of marketing undertaken by law firms, lawyers (attorneys) and solicitors that aims to promote the services of law firms and increase their brand awareness.

Digital platforms have increasingly dominated legal marketing plans, often at the expense of traditional print advertising, as the perceived benefits of digital marketing have grown.

Practices such as social media marketing, search engine optimization (SEO), email marketing, and pay-per-click advertising (PPC) now combine with traditional public relations and legal advertising (billboards, TV and radio ads, newspaper ads, etc.) as the main strategies in legal marketing.

== History ==
Many law firms advertised relatively freely in the U.S. in the 19th century. Ads appeared regularly in the classified sections of newspapers. Even Abraham Lincoln advertised his law firm in the 1850s.

Since then, the legal profession has had somewhat of an uneasy relationship with advertising. This was largely prompted by the American Bar Association (ABA) condemning lawyer advertising in its 1908 Canons of Professional Ethics, after which many states passed regulations banning or severely limiting attorney advertising.

From the early 20th century until the 1970s in the U.S., legal marketing was severely curtailed and where it was allowed, it was highly regulated. When two young attorneys (John R. Bates and Van O’Steen) advertised their legal clinic in a local Arizona newspaper in 1977, perceptions about legal marketing began to shift.

The legal clinic's advertisement stated that they were offering "legal services at very reasonable fees" and listed fees for certain services, such as uncontested divorces. It didn't go unnoticed. The lawyers were found to have violated the Arizona rule preventing attorneys from advertising in newspapers and a complaint was filed against them.

The lawyers sued the state and the case ultimately reached the U.S. Supreme Court in Bates v. State Bar of Arizona, 433 U.S. 350 (1977). The Supreme Court ruled that the restrictions on advertising and other forms of marketing were antiquated rules of etiquette that violated the First Amendment.

This case is considered to have paved the way for modern legal marketing in the U.S. and since then, the American Bar Association has regularly reviewed its guidelines for legal marketing.

In 1984, New Jersey became one of the first states to allow its law firms to advertise on radio and television.

The National Association of Law Firm Marketing Administrators was formed in 1986, and it was later rebranded as the Legal Marketing Association (LMA). From the mid-1980s on, many U.S. law firms began creating ads and increasing their marketing presence, using newsletters, billboards, newspapers, and so on.

=== Australia ===
In Australia, legal advertising is regulated by the Legal Services Commission of the State they practice in. Generally, Australian lawyers must ensure their advertising isn't false, misleading or deceptive, offensive or prohibited by law.

=== European Union ===
From the 1990s, other jurisdictions in continental Europe progressively opened the way for advertising. Advocates in Spain and France are among those able to freely use instruments of communication.

=== Germany ===
In Germany, prior to 1990, it was considered professionally improper to market your law firm. Because of the opinion that the law was above advertisement, the use of a logo anywhere was forbidden, and something as innocuous as a telephone book listing was subject to scrutiny. It was forbidden to give any sort of detailed information on your firm's practice areas or specializations anywhere, even in yellow page listings. Only the name of the firm, physical address, and telephone numbers were allowed. Law firms began to question the fairness of this prohibition in their profession.

In the 1990/1991 annual issue of the yellow pages for Nürnberg-Fürth, published by Deutsche Bundespost Telekom, the listing Dr Kreuzer & Coll, Nürnberg, Germany, broke with the status quo. The listing included not only the address, telephone, fax and telex numbers for the firm, but also the names of the founder of the firm, Dr. Günther Kreuzer, his partner Felix Müller, and the names of two of their attorneys as well as all of their specializations or areas of focus; Fachanwalt für Sozialrecht (Specialist for Civil Law), Fachanwalt für Arbeitsrecht (Specialist for Employment Law), Rechtsanwältin für Verkehrssachen (Lawyer for Traffic Law) and Rechtsanwalt für Familiensachen (Lawyer for Family Law). As soon as that edition was published, there was an objection filed by a fellow member of the bar. They complained that Dr Kreuzer & Coll had broken the code of professionalism and asked for a disciplinary hearing, stating a severe breach of professional etiquette.

Final ruling

The disciplinary court, an appellant court and ultimately, the Federal Court of Justice of Germany's Senate for Law Matters returned a decision in favor of the defendants and ruled that no breach of professional etiquette had transpired as the information that was posted was true and that there was no reason that firms should not be able to give such detailed information in their listings.

=== India ===
In India, an advocate shall not solicit work or advertise, except through a medium maintained by the Bar Council of India, either directly or indirectly, whether by circulars, advertisements, touts, personal communications, interviews not warranted by personal relations, furnishing or inspiring newspaper comments or producing his/her photographs to be published in connection with cases in which they have been engaged or concerned. Their sign-board or name-plate should be of a reasonable size. The sign-board or name-plate or stationery should not indicate that they are or have been a president or member of a bar council or of any association or that they have been associated with any person or organization or with any particular cause or matter or that they specialize in any particular type of work or that they had been a judge or an advocate general. Soliciting work or advertise as used in this clause of the code would not mean and include setting up of a web-site by an advocate or a law firm giving only basic information about the names and number of lawyers in a law firm, the contact details and areas of practice. This similarly applies to lawyers’ brochures and law directories.

Under the amended rule, advocates can mention in their chosen websites, their names, telephone numbers, e-mail ID, professional qualification and areas of specialization.

=== Israel ===
In Israel, legal marketing managers in big law firms were active since 2006. Their activity expanded due to the late-2000s recession which affected law firms, and due to the large number of lawyers per capita in Israel.

=== Italy ===
In Italy, the Bersani Decree of July 2, converted into law in January 2007 gives lawyers the right to advertise.

=== United Kingdom ===
==== England and Wales ====
Legal marketing has been permitted in England and Wales since 1986, when the Law Society of England and Wales first permitted lawyers to advertise. The Financial Services Authority now licences helplines and claims management agencies – except trade unions – which typically advertise and refer claims to lawyers.

=== United States ===
Lawyer advertising in the United States is legal, although subject to ethical rules promulgated by state bar associations. Lawyer advertising flourished in the 19th century, with ads appearing regularly in the classified sections of newspapers. Commonly encountered forms of lawyer advertising include television and radio commercials, print advertisements, billboards, direct mail marketing, law firm websites, and participation in telephone directories, commercial directories and referral services, and through online advertising and social media.

In 1908, the American Bar Association (ABA) established its first ethics code, known as the Canons of Professional Ethics, which condemned all advertisement and solicitation by lawyers. Due to the progression of the legal profession and the desire to update the Canons of Professional Ethics, the ABA created the Model Code of Professional Responsibility (Model Code) in 1969. The Model Code was an effort by the ABA to create practical rules that went "beyond the pretty details of form and manners" and addressed "the chained relationship of the lawyer to his clients, to his professional brethren and to the public."

The first major case law decision on legal advertising is the Supreme Court ruling in Bates v. Arizona State Bar 433 U.S. 350 (1977), in which the United States Supreme Court, held that lawyer advertising is partially protected by the First Amendment. The Supreme Court rejected the argument by the Arizona Bar that attorney advertising was "inherently misleading" and "tarnish the dignified public image of the profession." The Court found "the postulated connection between advertising and the erosion of true professionalism to be severely strained," and noted that "lack of legal advertising could be viewed as the profession's failure to 'reach out and serve the community."

The Federal Trade Commission (FTC) responded to the Supreme Court of Alabama's June 26, 2002 invitation to comment on the Alabama Rules of Professional Conduct entitled Information about Legal Services. In this response, the FTC "encourages competition in the licensed professions, including the legal profession, to the maximum extent compatible with other state and federal goals." Additionally, on May 26, 2006, the FTC commented on the State Bar of Texas Professional Ethics Committee's consideration on whether or not it is ethical for a Texas attorney to participate in an online lawyer referral services. The FTC determined that "online legal matching services are a valuable option for Texans: they are likely to reduce the consumers' cost for finding legal representation and have the potential to increase competition among attorneys."

Certain marketing practices are considered illegal, and many others may be considered violations of legal ethics. Shock advertising, for example, would be considered unethical; directly soliciting clients (known as barratry, or "ambulance chasing") is illegal.

The New York and Florida court systems proposed several restrictions on advertising in 2006 and 2007. The New York proposals generated controversy. In 2005, New York State Bar Association (NYSBA) President Vincent Buzard appointed a Task Force on Lawyer Advertising, chaired by Bernice K. Leber, to make proposals for consideration by NYSBA and the New York courts.

The new rules for New York were effective on February 1, 2007. For the first time, the New York Legal system defined legal advertising, as:
"any public or private communication made on or behalf of a lawyer or law firm about that lawyer or law firm's services, the primary purpose of which is for the retention of the lawyer or law firm." The new rule specifically exempts communications to existing clients or other lawyers. Publicity is, for the first time, also included as a synonym of advertising. The newly revised rules now allow advertising about a lawyer's publications and "bona fide professional ratings". There are certain special rules for email advertising, prohibiting spam.

The 2007 rules stated that advertising must not include a number of prohibited marketing devices:

1. Certain endorsements or testimonials from a former client
2. Portrayal of judges
3. Paid, undisclosed payment of testimonials
4. Portrayal of a judge, or fictitious lawyer or law firm
5. Use of actors or fictionalized persons
6. Irrelevant characteristics of the lawyers
7. Ads that resemble legal documents
8. Certain limits on soliciting new clients for 30 days after a tort
9. Certain other limits on communications with non-clients
10. Use of a nickname or moniker.

The new New York rules were challenged, and Judge Frederick J. Scullin of the United States District Court for the Northern District of New York struck down five of the rules as unconstitutional infringement of the First Amendment. The endorsement, portrayals, "Irrelevant characteristics", and nicknames provisions were stricken; however, the domain name limitations, 30-day solicitation, and communications rules were upheld. State Bar President Kathryn Madigan promised to work with the court system to develop new rules that will survive constitutional strict scrutiny.

== Changing attitudes toward legal advertising ==
While legal advertising remains heavily regulated in many states, some of the most stringent regulations have been relaxed by the American Bar Association and attitudes, in general, have become less prohibitive in the last couple of decades.

In a joint survey between the LMA and Bloomberg Law in 2018, 62 percent of law firm respondents said their firms were increasing emphasis on business development and marketing initiatives and 41 percent reported hiring or increasing marketing staff as one of the top new investments over the past two years.

In a 2016 survey by the same organizations, 68 percent of respondents (lawyers and marketing professionals) stated that the main catalyst for firms increasing their marketing and business development spending was "more internal pressure to generate revenue."

Reuters reported in late 2021 that the "Big Law war for talent isn’t just about lawyers. Law firms are also vying to hire top-level marketing and business development executives". As another sign of the emergence of legal marketing, at least 20 Am Law 200 firms brought on new chief marketing officers in 2021 and salaries for in-house legal marketing pros in major markets have increased by as much as 20 percent since 2020.

The Canadian Bar Association recommends that law firms should hire one in-house legal marketer for every 20–30 lawyers while smaller law firms should outsource legal marketing.

In the UK, legal marketing commenced in 1986, when the Law Society of England and Wales first permitted lawyers to advertise.

However, despite changing attitudes toward legal marketing, there are still concerns in many quarters about ethics. Even in jurisdictions that allow legal marketing, certain practices violate legal ethics, such as shock advertising, and ambulance chasing (capping).

The matter of legal marketing has created some controversy. For instance, in 2006, the Federal Trade Commission (FTC) intervened in the State Bar of Texas Professional Ethics Committee's decision on whether it was ethical for attorneys to use online lawyer referral services, finding that "online legal matching services are a valuable option for Texans: they are likely to reduce the consumers' cost for finding legal representation and have the potential to increase competition among attorneys."

Much of Europe retains stricter law firm marketing and advertising regulations. Countries like Slovenia and North Macedonia still impose strict rules on professional standards and discourage or prohibit legal marketing. In some other international jurisdictions, such as India, legal marketing is also greatly restricted.

== The growth of digital marketing for law firms ==
As early as 1996, the American Bar Association published its first edition of The Lawyer's Guide to Marketing on the Internet (now in its fourth edition).

Around this time, marketing and advertising companies also began offering digital marketing services for law firms.

Unlike traditional marketing techniques, which involve direct, one-way, outbound messaging to clients (via print, television, and radio advertising), new digital marketing strategies involved building awareness with prospective customers across multiple online channels and using inbound marketing strategies.

Search engine optimization, online reviews, lawyer directory profiles, and other digital marketing strategies started to grow during the late 1990s and early 2000s.

Digital marketing has continued to expand, offering additional tools for businesses to market online as marketing technology has advanced and more digital channels have emerged.

In one survey of B2B marketers in the U.S. conducted between January and February 2022, marketers expressed an intention to increase their spending on traditional advertising by just 0.55 percent that year compared with 13.59 percent for digital marketing.

The legal industry is no exception to this trend. There is a recognition that the majority of people looking for a lawyer now use the Internet to begin their search – a trend that began years before the COVID-19 pandemic but accelerated because of it.

Accordingly, legal marketing has continued to evolve into an online marketing niche of its own. Law firms increasingly combine digital marketing strategies with traditional marketing methods to promote their services and build and maintain their brands.

== Legal advertising strategies ==
As more law firms have adopted new advertising strategies, generating increased competition to attract prospective clients, the need for a comprehensive legal marketing strategy has grown.

This involves both offline and online marketing activities that tailor the marketing approach to clients.

Many law firms with several different practice areas need to target different buyer personas. Modern digital marketing methods available today can personalize marketing campaigns towards these different personas rather than advertising to a broader audience. This is a key reason why digital marketing has gained popularity over traditional marketing approaches for law firms.

The most popular legal marketing strategies include:

- Search engine optimization (SEO): SEO techniques are used to improve the visibility of websites on Google's search engine results pages, building brand recognition and increasing website traffic and attracting prospective clients.
- Social media marketing: Social media platforms help build brand awareness and while there are restrictions on the use of social media for lawyers, many firms can benefit from promoting themselves on platforms like Facebook and LinkedIn.
- Email marketing: Automated email campaigns can be used by law firms to connect with leads as well as current clients. By regularly passing on legal news, tips and advice to a database of potential clients, law firms demonstrate authority and stay top of mind.
- Pay-per-click advertising (PPC): Paid search marketing can generate leads more immediately than SEO. With Google Ads, advertisements appear at the top of its search engine results pages.
- Content marketing: Creating original content like eBooks, blog posts, articles and whitepapers that provide information of value to the target audience helps law firms increase visibility in Google searches, establish authority, and grow traffic and marketing leads.
- Print advertising: Print advertisements (e.g., in newspapers and magazines) and other printed materials such as brochures, presentation folders, business cards, proposal or report covers, résumés, and pre-printed stationery may be used to support client development and marketing communications.

== See also ==
- Ambulance chasing
- Barratry (common law)
- E-mail spam
