= Prommercial =

A prommercial is an amalgamation of a TV commercial and promotional video or film. It serves a dual purpose of entertainment and advertising to an audience.

Originally gaining attention from marketing circles, The Independent claimed "it will be proclaimed as the future of the music industry. It may also help rescue the tattered reputation of television advertising".

UK dance act Faithless were the first band to utilise the prommercial in conjunction with car Brand Fiat and marketing agency krow, using it to help promote their latest single ‘Feelin’ Good’ and subsequent album ‘The Dance’. The music video was aired during a Big Brother TV broadcast in the UK on August 15, with Fiat booking the entire three-minute commercial break on the UK's Channel 4.

Faithless, had who split from their record label Sony BMG, received no money for the collaboration but had the 'Feelin Good' video and subsequent TV promotion funded by Fiat. The Guardian newspaper speculated that “In an age where the concept of selling actual CDs is losing traction, it's perhaps inevitable that musicians are reassessing their relationship with big corporations.”

Following media interest the concept was discussed on Newsnight with Paul Stokes, associate editor of the NME and BBC Radio 4 featured it on the You & Yours show.
