= The Electronic Cable Committee =

The Electronic Cable Committee (TECC) was founded in 1992 by the Cabletelevision Advertising Bureau and the American Association of Advertising Agencies, with the aim of developing and testing "an electronic information exchange system to simplify the paperwork associated with buying commercial time on cable television".
