= Emarketer =

US market research company

EMARKETER, Inc.
- Type: Private subsidiary
- Industry: Market research
- Founded: 1996
- Headquarters: One Liberty Plaza; New York, New York
- Owner: Axel Springer SE
- Number of employees: 201–500
- Website: EMARKETER

Emarketer, stylized EMARKETER, formerly Insider Intelligence, is a subscription-based market research company that provides insights and trends related to digital marketing, media, and commerce.

== History ==
Emarketer was founded in 1996, and is headquartered in New York City.

In June 2016, the German media company Axel Springer acquired 93% of Emarketer for around $242 million. eMarketer's co-founders, Terry Chabrowe and Geoff Ramsey, retained the remaining 7% stake and were expected to remain with the company.

In June 2019, Axel Springer announced plans to merge financial news website Business Insider, which it acquired in 2015 for $343 million, with Emarketer. In 2020, eMarketer was combined with Business Insider Intelligence, the subscription research arm associated with Business Insider, under the Insider Intelligence brand.

In 2024 the brand was reverted back to EMARKETER.

== Products and services ==
=== Corporate subscription ===
Subscribers have access to Emarketer's data via a web-based client portal. Within the database, analysts, forecasters, and researchers publish industry reports, forecasts, comparative estimates, charts, articles, interviews, case studies, web conferencing and videos. The company curates, compares, and contextualizes information from global sources to provide macro-level understanding of digital trends related to advertising, marketing, media and commerce.
