= FAST marketing =

Marketing technique for consumer packaged goods

FAST marketing (the 'Focused Advertising/Sampling Technique') was a marketing tool devised in 1992 to create step-changes in usage of packaged goods brands.

FAST marketing combined high-intensity true-to-life advertising with large-scale product sampling. It fell out of general use in the early 2000s as a result of the fragmentation of television viewing, itself the result of proliferation of media choice and growing Internet usage.

== Theory ==
Prof John Deighton (then of Dartmouth College, Hanover, New Hampshire) proposed in 1984 that advertising could enhance – i.e. change perceptions of – a subsequent experience of the advertised product. In 1988, while at the University of Chicago, Deighton and Robert M. Schindler demonstrated the principle experimentally.

Also in 1988, Profs Lawrence Marks and Michael Kamins of the University of Southern California demonstrated that such effects were paradoxically optimised if claims made by the advertising were not hyperbolic, i.e. were true to life.

In 1993, English adman John Bunyard, then at NW Ayer’s London office, demonstrated experimentally that systematic matching of the advertising's premise to actual experience created increments in purchasing that could not be explained by the additive effect of advertising and product trial. Bunyard proposed a new 'experiential' model whereby engineering trial of a product would take precedence over persuasive communications, and the experience itself would be psychologically optimized by accurately matching expectations set by advertising immediately beforehand.

== Practice ==
The experimental evidence suggested a new marketing model for achieving growth in brand usage, a notoriously difficult challenge for established brands. The tool devised to exploit the theory on a commercial scale, FAST marketing, was a process that involved engineering consumer trial of a product in the immediate wake of television advertising designed to set accurate expectations of the true experience. Such activity was necessarily conducted on a massive scale in order to achieve adequate crossover of advertising and product sampling within the population: typically a geographic region would be exposed to sufficient TV advertising to give up to three-quarters of households an opportunity to see it, and around a third of households would receive a product sample.

Following coverage of FAST theory in national media, its use rapidly spread worldwide, being employed extensively by major packaged-goods manufacturers and regularly producing enduring sales increments in controlled tests that far exceeded what was possible by means of conventional brand marketing. Although seldom practised today in its pure form, certain advertising media agencies continue to use the term loosely to describe intensive integrated campaigns.

== Theoretical legacy ==
In psychological terms, FAST marketing was generally understood in the 1990s in the context of cognitive dissonance theory with its emphasis on a universal drive to reduce asymmetry between belief and reality. Its behavioral effects were specifically ascribed to the bond of trust established by experiential affirmation of an expectation set honestly by advertising.

In the 21st century, this understanding has been refined by neuroscientific developments concerning the dopamine-reward system, notably in respect of behaviors established automatically by the accurate matching of expectation and reality. Such findings have prompted more sophisticated investigations into the nature of customer experience employing neuroscientific tools and scientific method as distinct from questionnaire-based, interpretation-led market research.

These more sophisticated means of defining business experiences have in turn enabled the creation of more psychologically rounded experiences – ones sufficiently compelling that a hyperbole-free advertising evocation may by itself be persuasive. This ‘heuristic’ (i.e. instinctually correct rather than persuasion-oriented) thinking has recently been lent a new impetus by the quest for authenticity prompted by loss of consumer trust in corporate business.
