= Core77 =

US design magazine

- Editor: Eric Ludlum
- Categories: Design magazine
- Publisher: Stuart Constantine
- Country: United States
- Based in: New York
- Language: English
- Website: Core77.com

Core77 is an online design magazine that covers the field of industrial design.

The site began as the graduate thesis of Stuart Constantine and Eric Ludlum in their final year at Brooklyn, New York's Pratt Institute. The site was launched in March 1995 and has been updated on a monthly basis since. It was first hosted at Interport, an early ISP in New York City; later it moved to its own domain.

Core77 also hosts an annual Core77 Design Awards competition, founded in 2011, to reward excellence in the field of design.
