= A Guide to Window-Dressing =

Handbook about preparing shop windows from 1883

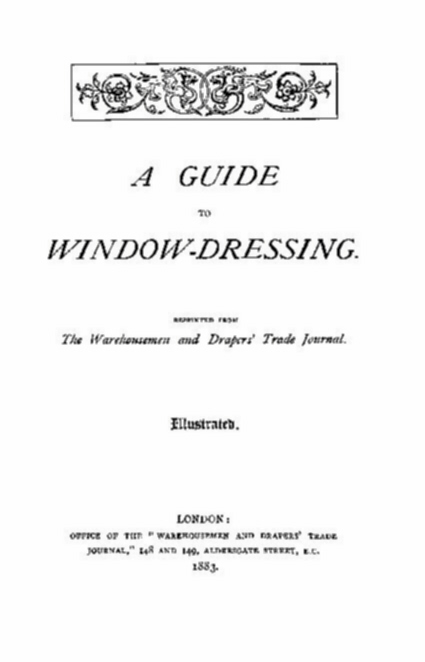
- A photocopy of the original (1883) title page of A Guide to Window-Dressing.
- Author: anonymous
- Illustrator: anonymous
- Language: English
- Subject: Window-dressing, drapery, home decor
- Publisher: W H & L Collingridge
- Publication date: 1883
- Publication place: England (United Kingdom of Great Britain and Ireland)
- Media type: Print (Hardcover)
- Pages: 80
- OCLC: 39203562

A Guide to Window-Dressing (sometimes stylised as A Guide to Window Dressing or A guide to window-dressing) is an illustrated anonymous publication and handbook on the subject of window-dressing first printed in London in 1883. It is one of the earliest known books printed on the topic; specifically, it provides detailed instructions and guidelines on window-dressing, drapery and display windows for the use of professional retailers and privately owned homes.

Through its descriptions of virtual topics in business, marketing techniques associated with window product display, and the use of windows as fashionable parts of residential spaces, the book is considered a seminal work on minute advertising procedures and home decor techniques exercised in late-19th-century Europe.

Through a lack of general reprinting, the work is considered extremely rare. As of February 2010, WorldCat.org displays only one result for the book in worldwide public libraries – the Buffalo & Erie County Public Library in Buffalo, New York in the United States. A reprinted version was published in 2008 by the rare and out-of-print book publisher Kessinger Publishing under ISBN 1-4367-3078-3.

The first edition of A Guide to Window-Dressing is designated with the OCLC number 39203562.

== Background ==
According to the original 1883 text, A Guide to Window-Dressing was first published earlier that year in a local periodical, The Warehousemen and Drapers' Trade Journal. The journal article was written and submitted anonymously, the book citing the periodical's headquarters as "London: office of 'The Warehousemen and Drapers' Trade Journal,' 148 and 149, Aldersgate Street, E.C." The book adapted was published by the now defunct W H & L Collingridge publishing house, at the City Press located on the same street.

The preface to the book states that it was created in response to numerous inquiries to the proprietors of The Warehousemen and Drapers' Trade Journal for a comprehensive work on window-dressing, and goes on to promote itself by stating the following:

"No such book in connection with the drapery trade has, so far as they [the journal proprieters] are aware, been hitherto published, with the exception of a small prize essay published several years ago in connection with the same journal."

According to Google Books and a library stamp seen on its facsimile of the guide, an extant copy of the first edition was found in the Bodleian Library at Oxford University, first placed in the library's collections on 9 March 1987. This copy appears as a full-view readable version on that website, digitised on 1 May 2007.

Illustrations provided in the first edition of the work are, like the author, also uncredited.

== Contents ==
The first edition of the book had been divided into a preface, a table of contents and 15 chapters following them. These are chronicled as follows:

- Preface
- Contents
- Chapters
  - I (1) — The Importance of a Good Window
  - II (2) — Qualifications to Attain Success
  - III (3) — Colour
  - IV (4) — The Silk Window
  - V (5) — The Print Window
  - VI (6) — The Fancy Dress Window
  - VII (7) — The Drapery Window
  - VIII (8) — The Mourning Window
  - IX (9) — The Costume Window
  - X (10) — The Mantle Window
  - XI (11) — Fancy Windows
  - XII (12) — Trimming and Haberdashery Windows
  - XIII (13) — Mixed Windows
  - XIV (14) — Fittings and Tickets
  - XV (15) — Door-Dressing

Each section of the book addresses different aspects of window-dressing and their respectable applications, and puts forward a common aesthetic value for distinct types of windows and window display.
