= Fear pattern =

Advertising technique

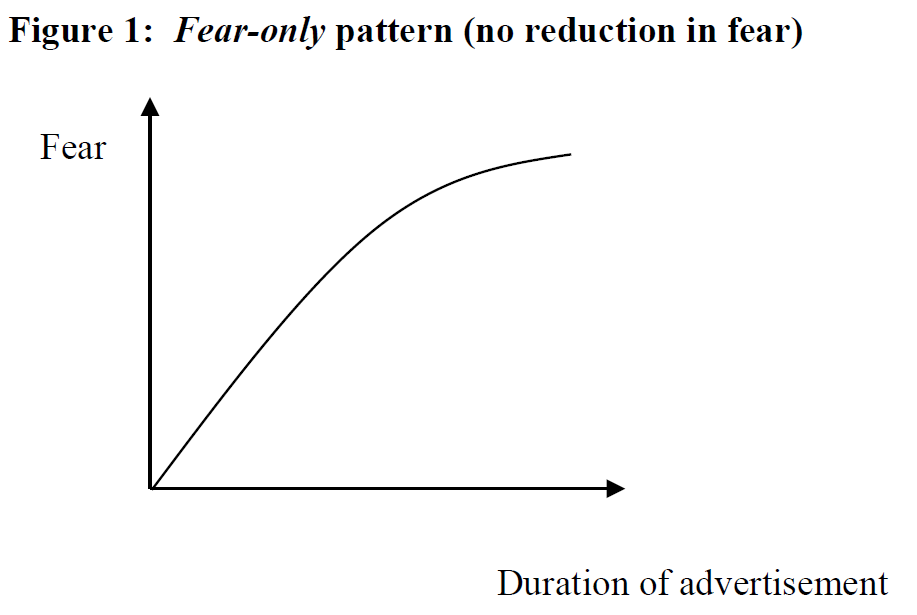
Fear-only fear pattern

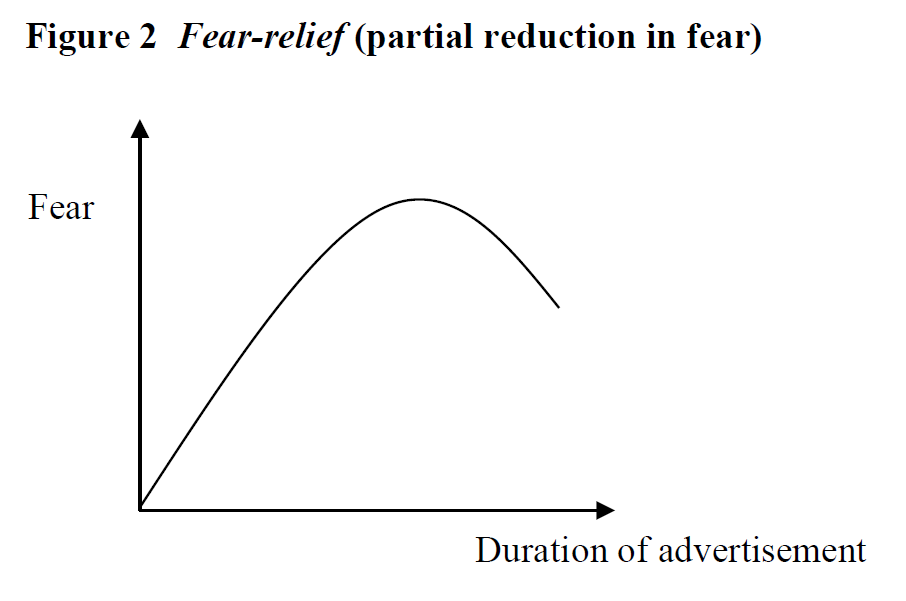
Partial-relief fear pattern

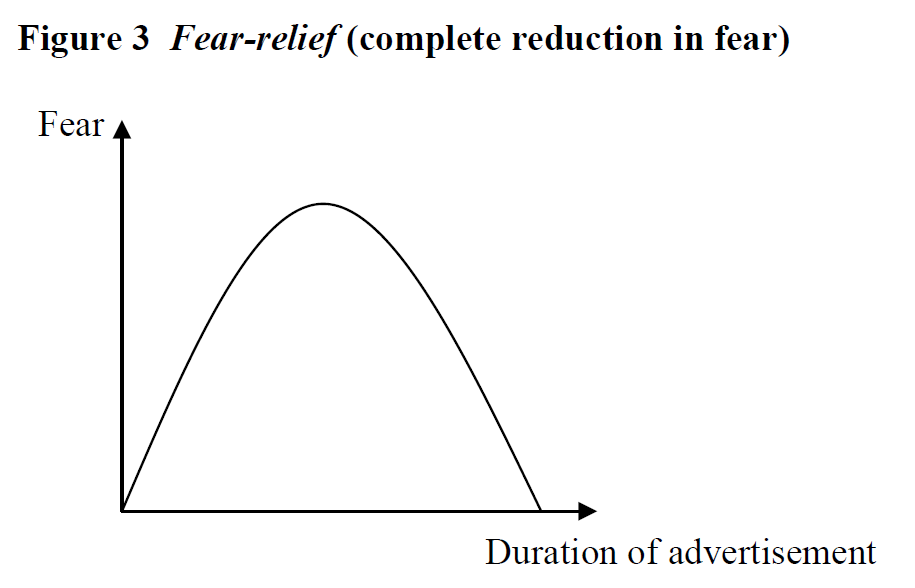
Fear-relief fear pattern

In advertising, a fear pattern is a sequence of fear arousal and fear reduction that is felt by the viewing audience when exposed to an advertisement, which attempts to threaten the audience by presenting a negative physical, psychological or social consequence that is likely to occur if they engage in a particular behaviour. Fear appeals are commonly used in social marketing campaigns. These are sometimes called “threat appeals”, however the label “fear appeals” is justified if the appeal can be shown to arouse fear.

== Methods ==
The fear pattern of an advertisement can largely be identified as either fear-relief or fear-only. A fear-relief pattern involves arousing fear and causing the audience to experience an unpleasant feeling that is then reduced by showing the consequences of the recommended behaviour. A fear-only pattern is created by only arousing fear and not reducing fear by providing relief components within an advertisement. The possibilities for different classifications of fear reduction include no reduction in fear (fear-only), partial reduction in fear (fear-partial relief), or complete reduction in fear (fear-relief).

A dynamic, temporal measure of fear is necessary to determine the fear pattern exhibited by a broadcast (TV or radio) anti-speeding advertisement. This requires continuous response measurement (CRM).

The fear patterning theory suggests that it is not the absolute amount of fear that drives attitude change or behaviour change, but the sequence of fear then reduction in fear, that is, relief felt by the audience.

Relief is an emotion that is normally preceded by some other higher level of arousal, such as fear, or anxiety, that is, relief generally cannot occur without the precursor of the emotion of fear, and is a result of the removal or reduction of the fearful feeling.

The fear pattern theory proposes that a sequence of fear then relief stimuli will be optimal in causing attitude and/or behaviour change. The proposed fear pattern theory builds on Hovland, Janis and Kelley's fear-as-acquired-drive (drive-reduction) model, that was one of the earlier major theories of how fear appeals work, based on the assumption that it is fear reduction that makes such an appeal effective.

Drive-reduction theory assumes that “the reduction of emotional tension operates as a reinforcement of the reassuring recommendation.” That is, once fear is aroused and creates motivation for action (drive), any relief stimuli (such as the recommended behaviour) that decreases the fear is a reinforcement of the recommended behavior.

== Research ==
The overwhelming majority of previous studies have focused upon the effect of fear arousal, but have not investigated the effect of fear reduction. Both Sutton and Job signaled the need for research into the effect of fear reduction.

== See also ==
- Shock advertising
