= Digital Signage Federation =

American non-profit industry organization

- Founded: 2010
- Type: Not-For-Profit - 501(c)(6)
- Purpose: Digital Signage
- Location: Warrenton, Virginia, United States
- Region served: United States
- Method: Membership
- Chairman: Len Dudis
- Website: www.digitalsignagefederation.org

Digital Signage Federation (DSF) is an American non-profit organization dedicated to the advancement of the Digital Signage industry. It was established and named by Angelo R. Varrone and his wife A. Karen Varrone. Karen was instrumental in finding and selecting the initial Executive Director of DSF. The foundation of industry volunteer professionals formed in 2010 established a trade association focused on education, networking, and standards development. The purposes of the DSF are to support and promote the common business interests of the interactive technologies industry, the digital signage industry, and the digital out-of-home network industry (DOOH).

The DSF was formed in March 2010 and officially incorporated on May 12, 2010. Since its incorporation, the DSF has supported the research of, and improved legislation, regulation, code and standards that affect the sale and use of, digital signage and other products and services within the Association Industries (digital signage, interactive technologies, and DOOH).

Its current structure includes an Executive committee formed by a Chairman, Vice-Chairman, Treasurer/Secretary, and Immediate Past Chairman; and a rotating Board of At-Large Directors composed of 14 industry professionals.

== History ==
The DSF was formed by a number of industry professionals to form a trade association focused on education, networking, and standards development. The group of individuals who started the organization came from attendees and exhibitors of the "Digital Signage Expo" (DSE) trade show in 2010. The initial group of leaders was appointed and membership was free for the first year. The DSE and the DSF created a funding agreement and the DSF recognized the DSE as its official industry trade show. Also in 2010, the board adopted the Digital Signage Experts Group certification program as its official certification and received discounts for members. The DSF also held its first election of board members.

The original structure of the DSF was that there were independent governing councils based on industry sector. These "mini-associations" were to appoint representatives to the board. In essence, it was a federation of interest groups, hence the name.

In 2011 the association adopted new bylaws that removed the industry sector groups and formed an official singular governing board. Additionally, the DSF began to do outreach to specific industry sectors and formed new education initiatives. The legacy left by the then-Chairman Bob Stowe was the development of the organization's structure.

In 2012 the DSF adopted a glossary of terms and a new Education Standard to guide the formation of education programs at colleges in the medium of digital signage. The legacy of Chairman Alan Brawn was the development of the education activities of the association. It was decided that DSF's board would meet quarterly instead of monthly. Board meetings use a modified Robert's Rules of Order.

In 2013 the DSF started regional networking events, more industry vertical outreach, increased its webcasts, and hosted its first DSF In-Forum, an event to provide end users with a business tool to freely and easily source Request for proposal (RFPs) for their projects. The legacy of Chairman Philip M. Cohen was the establishment of the networking meetings and increased membership.

In May 2014, the organization's membership count surpassed the 500-milestone.

In February 2016, the DSF announced that OVAB Europe would become an independent affiliate of the DSF, and that it would change its name to DSF Europe. DSF Europe has kept control of its own budget and annual agenda, and has a seat on the DSF Board of Directors.

== Activities ==
Since its incorporation, the DSF has hosted a number of projects and initiatives with the aim to support research in, and to improve legislation, regulations, code and standards that affect the sale and use of, digital signage and other products and services within the interactive technologies industry, and the DOOH industry. It has established Privacy Standards that have since been cited in national publications and before Congress;.

The DSF has provided monthly educational opportunities in a variety of formats to facilitate learning opportunities, whitepapers and case studies important to the industry. Some of the initial activities of the association included a member directory, online topical webinars, adoption of an industry privacy standard, and recognition of college affiliated chapters. The DSF has established Regional Networking Events, attended various industry shows, and provided industry research.

The DSF is governed by a Board of Directors, a volunteer member board that is elected by the DSF membership in an annual election. The board consists of an Executive Committee - Chairman, Vice-Chairman, Treasurer/Secretary, and Immediate Past Chairman, all of whom serve one-year terms in their roles. The At-Large Directors are elected to two-year terms on a rotating basis, so that there are four or five directors each year who rotate on/off the board.

== Certification ==
The Digital Signage Federation, the Digital Signage Expo and numerous manufacturers, distributors, Sellers, and end users have partnered with the Digital Signage Experts Group (DSEG) to bring a comprehensive set of certification programs to the digital signage industry. These courses are designed to bring an individual the education they need, from a fundamental level, to in depth technical training in critical areas of digital signage. These certification programs are administered by an independent industry organization and advisory board, to bring a clear educational message and industry recognition for professional achievement.

The Digital Signage Federation has adopted the Digital Signage Experts Group (DSEG) industry certifications for inclusion in the DSF's efforts to establish industry standards, promote professionalism, and provide continuity of education for the digital signage industry. In addition, the DSEG is providing DSF members discounts on these programs.
