= Digital Doesn't Matter =

2014 book by Josh Sklar

Digital Doesn't Matter (And Other Advertising Heresies)
- Front cover
- Author: Josh Sklar
- Language: English
- Published: July 7, 2014 (paperback)
- Publisher: Heresy Press
- Pages: 562 (paperback)
- ISBN: 978-0692226858

Digital Doesn't Matter (And Other Advertising Heresies) is a book by Josh Sklar about the past, present, and future of the advertising industry with a focus on the effect digital is having on it. The book was released in paperback form by Heresy Press on July 7, 2014. According to the author, its title is meant to be ironic.

== Background and description ==
Josh Sklar's Digital Doesn't Matter is a 562-page book that describes how digital content has become ubiquitous, and how the medium of delivery should not be treated as an obstacle for advertisers. Sklar and his former colleague John Lambie wrote the book as both an interactive and a conventional stand-alone work.

Digital Doesn't Matter features a foreword by American advertising executive Jeff Goodby; additional contributors include Valerie Cheng, Jeff Cheong, Jon Cook, Steve Elrick, Andy Greenaway, Chris Kyme, Sean Lam, Ken Mandel, Craig Mapleston, Peter Moss, Jim Speelmon, and Joe Zandstra. It is the result of more than 1,200 transcribed pages from over 100 interviews with branding and marketing professionals.

The book is split into four parts: "The Good Old Days", "Things Fall Apart", "Digital Takes Over", and "The Future of Advertising". The first part takes on a nostalgic tone and describes how chief executive officers and creative directors created their first websites in the 1990s. The second part focuses on work processes, advances and changes in the advertising industry, and how to "reboot" the agency process. The third gives advice on how to be successful in a digital world. The fourth part says that the current model is detrimental to the industry and recommends alternatives.

Sklar has said of the book's concept, "It's about the transformation of traditional agencies and marketers and the fact that most agencies have been very slow about embracing it. There's been a lot of fear and a lot of confusion. So focus is about getting the insights of people from all over the world to portray the actual situation. What we found is agencies that had not turned to digital have not earned their clients' trust."

== Funding ==
Sklar and Lambie launched a Kickstarter campaign called "Digital Doesn't Matter: Reinventing the Advertising Industry" on January 21, 2013, to raise money to create an iPad app and to self-publish the book on Amazon.com in both digital and hardcover formats. In February 2013, Silicon Hills News reported that the duo were almost half-way to their $30,000 goal with 152 contributors and 24 days remaining. The campaign was ultimately successful, with 341 backers pledging $36,940.

== Reception ==
Communication Arts called the book a "compendium of brutally honest, provocative insights that are, at times, pure heresy" and included it as "recommended reading" in their "Advertising Annual" for 2014.

Laura Lorek of Silicon Hills News described the project as "a lasting platform that can be updated and changed with the focus on what went wrong with the advertising industry and ideas on how to fix it". Farah Siru of Marketing Magazine called the book "an ironic compilation of opinions and insights from some of the best admen in the business, presented in a linear storyline".

Allein Moore of AdAsia compared Sklar's work in digital advertising to James Lee's (pseudonym for Jim Aitchison) work in television, print, and radio advertising. He wrote, "Bearing in mind the speed of development across the digital platforms, this book may not be relevant for too many years but right now, it is a 'must read' for both clients and agency people."
