= Shock advertising =

Advertising method

Shock advertising or shockvertising is a type of advertising that "deliberately, rather than inadvertently, startles and offends its audience by violating norms for social values and personal ideals". It is the employment in advertising or public relations of "graphic imagery and blunt slogans to highlight" a public policy issue, goods, or services. Shock advertising is designed principally to break through the advertising “clutter” to capture attention and create buzz, and also to attract an audience to a certain brand or bring awareness to a certain public service issue, health issue, or cause (e.g., urging drivers to use their seatbelts, promoting STD prevention, bringing awareness of racism and other injustices, or discouraging smoking among teens).

This form of advertising is often controversial, disturbing, explicit and crass, and may entail bold and provocative political messages that challenge the public’s conventional understanding of the social order. This form of advertising may not only offend but can also frighten as well, using scare tactics and elements of fear to sell a product or deliver a public service message, making a "high impact." In the advertising business, this combination of frightening, gory and/or offensive advertising material is known as "shockvertising" and is often considered to have been pioneered by Benetton, the Italian clothing retailers which created the line United Colors of Benetton, and its advertisements in the late 1980s (see Benetton below).

== Types ==
Shock advertisements can be shocking and offensive for a variety of reasons, and violation of social, religious, and political norms can occur in many different ways. They can include a disregard for tradition, law or practice (e.g., lewd or tasteless sexual references or obscenity), defiance of the social or moral code (e.g., vulgarity, brutality, nudity, feces, or profanity) or the display of images or words that are horrifying, terrifying, or repulsive (e.g., gruesome or revolting scenes, or violence). Some advertisements may be considered shocking, controversial or offensive not because of the way that the advertisements communicate their messages but because the products themselves are "unmentionables" not to be openly presented or discussed in the public sphere. Examples of these “unmentionables” may include cigarettes, feminine hygiene products, or contraceptives. However, there are several products, services or messages that could be deemed shocking or offensive to the public. For example, advertisements for weight loss programs, sexual or gender related products, clinics that provide AIDS and STD testing, funeral services, groups that advocate for less gun control, casinos which naturally support and promote gambling could all be considered controversial and offensive advertising because of the products or messages that the advertisements are selling. Shocking advertising content may also entail improper or indecent language, like French Connection's “fcuk” campaign.

== Effectiveness ==
Advertisers, psychiatrists, and social scientists have long debated the effectiveness of shock advertising. Some scientists argue that shocking ads of course evoke stronger feelings among the consumers. One finding suggests “shocking content in an advertisement significantly increases attention, benefits memory, and positively influences behavior.” The same study also shows that consumers are more likely to remember shocking advertising content over advertising content that is not shocking. Shock advertising could also refer to the usage of emotional appeals such as humor, sex or fear. Humor has for a long time been the most frequently used communication tool within advertising, and according to branch active people it is considered to be the most effective.

The effects of shock advertising could also be explained by the theory of selective perception. Selective perception is the process by which individual selects, organizes and evaluates stimuli from the external environment to provide meaningful experiences for him- or herself. This means that people focus in certain features of their environment to the exclusion of others. The consumer unconsciously chooses which information to notice and this kind of selection is dependent of different perceptual filters which are based on the consumer’s earlier experiences. One example of this kind of filter is perceptual defense. Perceptual defense is the tendency for people to protect themselves against ideas, objects or situations that are threatening. This means that if a consumer finds a certain kind of advertising content threatening or disturbing, this message will be filtered out. An example of this is heavy smoker who could be filtering out a picture of cancer-sick lung since the content could be perceived as disturbing and uncomfortable.

A company could suffer long term branding issues if using shock advertising as a communication method. Using shocking pictures could affect the way consumers perceive a brand and quality of their product.

== Examples ==
Examples include the use of blood and gore, diseased organs and human body parts, and so on. Thus, it can expose any taboo, but typically has an unnecessarily sexually suggestive image. Benetton Group has had several shocking ads of a priest and a nun kissing, a black woman breast-feeding a white baby, and death row inmates' thoughts. Legal advertising that employs shockvertising would depict or re-enact a car accident, which is now illegal in New York.

This practice has been compared to extreme sports and lewd behavior, and to the Jerry Springer show.

Shockvertising is recognized around the world as a term of art, in Polish, in German, and Dutch.

=== Benetton ===
Benetton has come under particular scrutiny for the use of shock advertisements in its campaigns, leading to public outrage and consumer complaints. However, several of Benetton’s advertisements have also been the subject of much praise for heightening awareness of significant social issues and for “taking a stand” against infringements on human rights, civil liberties, and environmental rights. Benetton’s advertisements have featured images of portions of men’s and women’s bodies with tattoos that say "HIV Positive", a Black woman breastfeeding a White infant (which could be celebrated as a championing image of racial diversity or raising awareness of racial issues yet was also denounced for its historical connotations when Black women, during slavery, were often required to become caretakers for White children), a priest and a nun leaning to kiss each other, as well as a group of real death row inmates (alluding to issues concerning capital punishment). Other shocking advertisements released by Benetton include an image of a duck covered in oil (addressing issues of oil spillage and the cleanliness of oceans), a man dying of AIDS, a soldier holding a human bone, as well as a newborn infant still attached to its umbilical cord, which "was intended as an anthem to life, but was one of the most censured visuals in the history of Benetton ads." Oliviero Toscani, a photographer for Benetton who contributed to many of its shocking advertisements, said, regarding the advertisement he created of a man dying from AIDS, that he wanted "to use the forum of poster advertising to make people aware of this [AIDS] tragedy at a time when no-one dared to show AIDS patients."

=== Calvin Klein ===
Calvin Klein of Calvin Klein Jeans has also received media attention for its controversial advertisements in the mid-1990s. Several of Calvin Klein's advertisements featured images of teenage models, some "who were reportedly as young as 15" in overly sexual and provocative poses. Although Klein insisted that these advertisements were not pornographic, some considered the campaign as a form of "soft porn" that was exploitative, shocking, and suggestive. In 1999, Calvin Klein was the subject of more controversy when it aired advertisements of young children who were only wearing the brand's underwear. This "kiddie underwear ad campaign" was pulled only one day after it aired as a result of public outlash. A spokesperson from Calvin Klein insisted that these ads were intended "to capture the same warmth and spontaneity that you find in a family snapshot."

=== "Get Unhooked" anti-smoking ads ===
In May 2007, the UK National News reported that the British government banned anti-smoking advertisements that were part of the "Get Unhooked" campaign because they caused "fear and distress" in children. These public service advertisements featured in magazines, television, and on the internet displayed images of smokers' faces and lips being hooked with fish hooks "to illustrate how they were 'hooked' on cigarettes." Although this campaign received hundreds of complaints citing that the advertisements were offensive, disturbing and violent, the Department of Health was reported as saying that the "Get Unhooked" campaign was "highly effective."

== See also ==
- Advertising
- Fear pattern
- Sex in advertising
- Jump scare § In advertising
