= Gladvertising =

Gladvertising is outdoor advertising that uses cameras and facial recognition software to read a consumer's mood, then pushes products relevant to the target emotional state. Gladvertising uses emotion recognition software to tailor outdoor adverts to consumers' mood.

The term was coined in a July 2011 report by the Centre of Future Studies which suggests that advertisements like the ones in the film Minority Report may be well on the way and that some already exist. Their report, which was commissioned by 3MGTG, which specialises in digital advertising – foresees the first step to be advertisements that adapt to our moods.

The technology had been dubbed 'Gladverts' by the report's authors.
