= Employee pricing =

Automotive selling strategy

Employee pricing is a selling strategy launched in 2005 by the auto industry to attract customers by using the discounted prices that auto industry employees pay for new cars rather than the sticker price MSRP. The program was first offered that year by General Motors, and later followed by Ford, Chrysler, and some local dealerships. While 2005 was the biggest year for the promotion, it has since been used several times, like during the automotive industry crisis of 2008 to stimulate sales.

Chrysler was the most notable of all during this promotion, with its "Employee Pricing Plus". Characterized by generous incentives combined with rebates on most Chrysler, Dodge, and Jeep models, Chrysler claims their offer bests those "employee discount" prices offered by General Motors or Ford Motor Company.

Lee Iacocca is the celebrity spokesman for the campaign; he appears in summer 2005 ads with Jason Alexander, Snoop Dogg, and his granddaughter.

According to its TV ads and website, the world's first employee pricing program for customers was instituted by The Brick, a Canadian furniture store.

Starting on July 1, 2006, Chrysler reinstituted the Employee Pricing Plus program to run from July 1 to July 31. For the first five days of the program, all Chrysler, Dodge, Jeep dealerships in the United States were open until midnight to support the program, a first in the company's history.

The discounted prices however do not impact profits much, as the margins are recovered with higher sales and better contribution to fixed costs.

Chrysler reinstated employee pricing price starting January 26th, 2009.
