= Australian Association of National Advertisers =

The Australian Association of National Advertisers (AANA) is the national body for advertisers based in Sydney, Australia. The AANA represents the interests of organisations involved in Australia's advertising, marketing and media industry.

== Purpose ==
The AANA aims to;

- Promote and safeguard the rights of its members to communicate freely with their customers,
- Protect consumers by ensuring advertising and marketing communications are conducted responsibly. AANA implements this through management of a self-regulatory system, including a set of voluntary codes.

== Practice ==
The Advertising Standards Board, which is administratively supported by the Advertising Standards Bureau, deals with complaints under the Codes which are adjudicated by the independent system.

The AANA established, created and reviews these codes that came into effect in 1997 following consultations with advertisers, agencies, the media, consumer groups and government representatives.

== See also ==
- AANA Website (Archived)
