= Digital Place-based Advertising Association =

The Digital Place-based Advertising Association (DPAA) is a trade organization based out of Cutchogue, New York that is focused on digital place-based advertising. It is listed as a 501(c)(6) non-profit by the IRS. The DPAA was established in 2007 and was initially known as the Out-of-Home Video Advertising Bureau (OVAB). In 2010, the association was rebranded as the DPAA, and its scope expanded to provide industry-related support to its members, suppliers, and professionals involved in digital out-of-home networks.

The DPAA organizes the annual DPAA Global Summit event, which is centered on industry trends, developments, and strategies. The summit includes speakers and networking opportunities for attendees.

As of 2022, the President and Chief Executive Officer of the DPAA is Barry Frey.

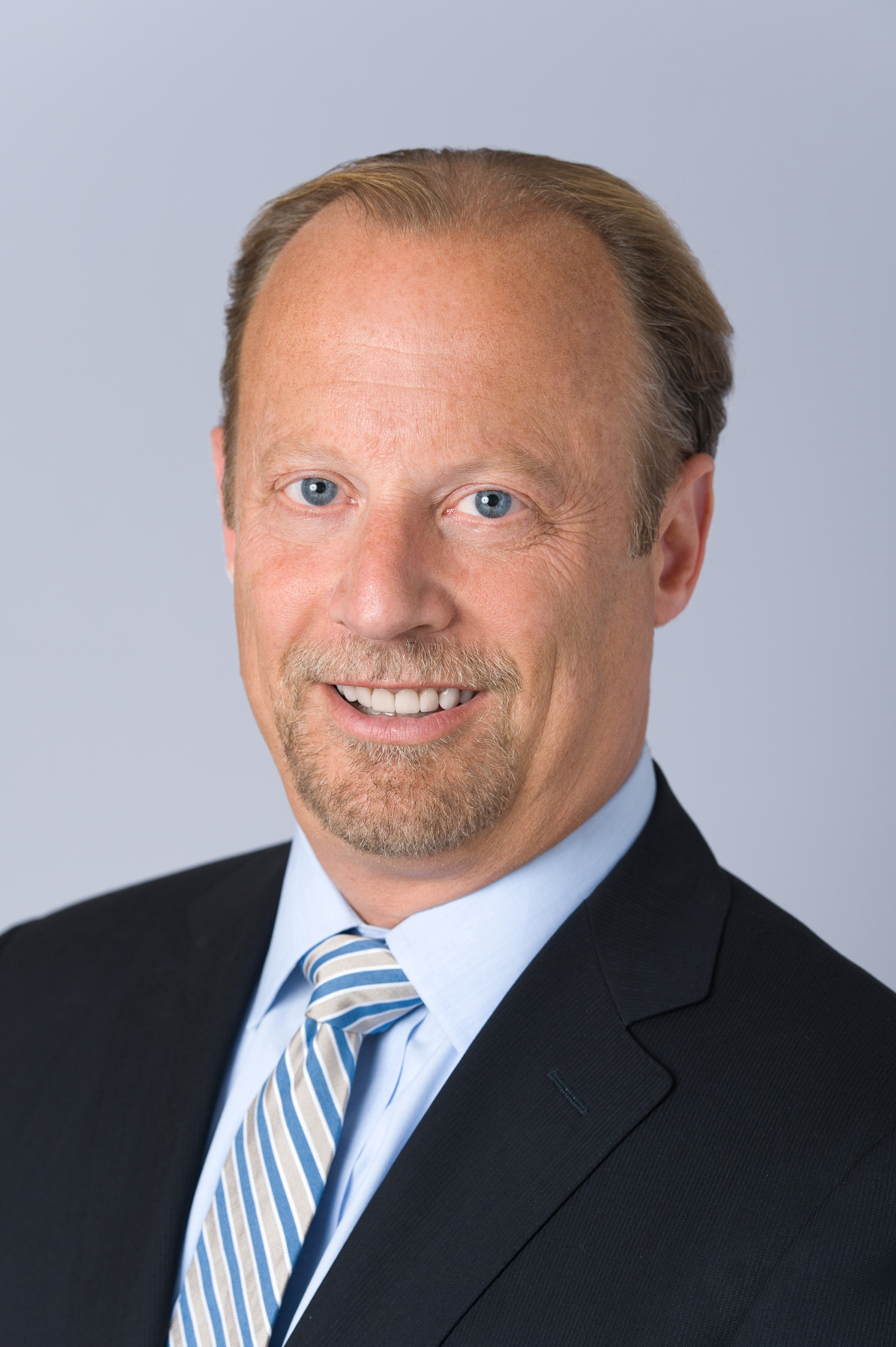
Barry Frey, president and CEO
