= Television advertisement =

Paid commercial segment on television

1981 American television advertisement for Quaker Corn Bran

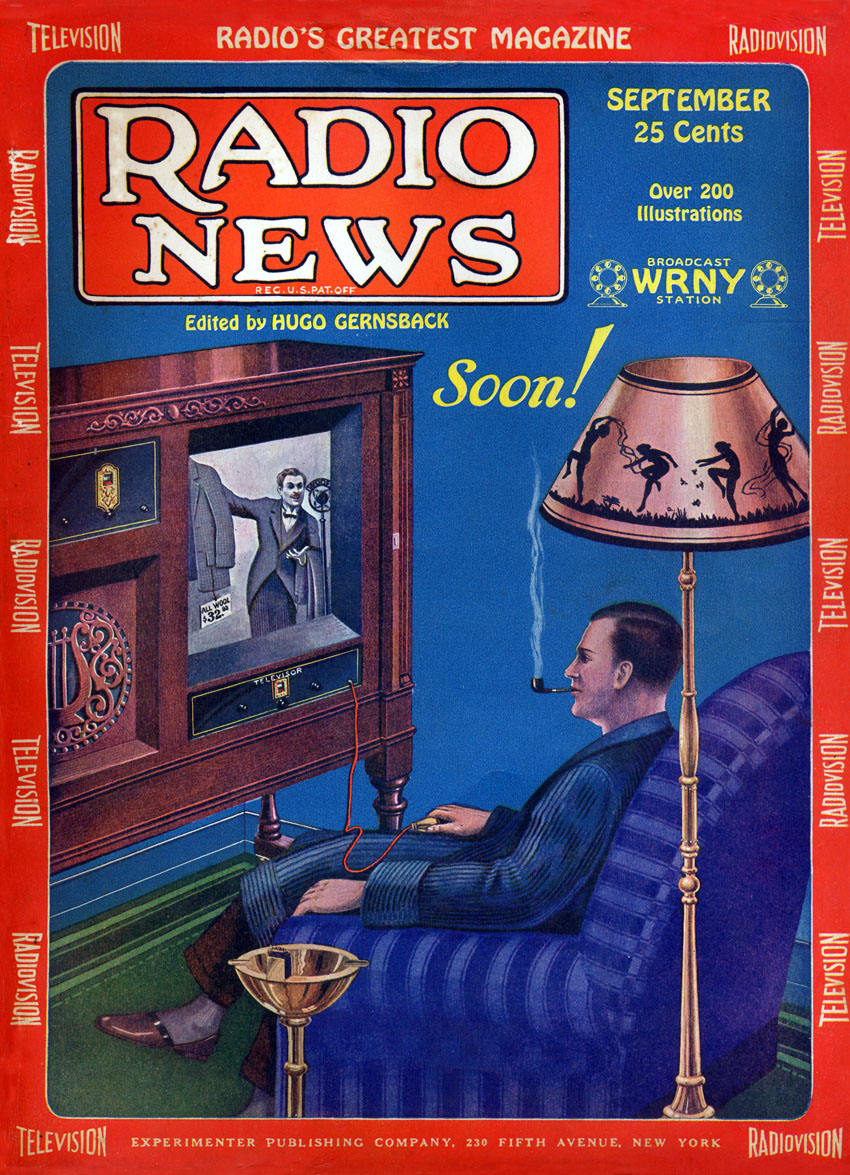
Television was still in its experimental phase in 1928, but the medium's potential to sell goods, services, and ideas was already predicted by this Radio News cover from that year.

A television advertisement (also called a commercial, spot, break, advert, or ad) is a span of television programming produced and paid for by an organization. It conveys a message promoting, and aiming to market, a product, service or idea. Advertisers and marketers may refer to television commercials as TVCs, while Japan refers to them as CMs (Commercial Messages).

Advertising revenue provides a significant portion of the funding for most privately owned television networks. During the 2010s, the number of commercials has grown steadily, though the length of each commercial has diminished. Advertisements of this type have promoted a wide variety of goods, services, and ideas ever since the early days of the history of television. The viewership of television programming, as measured by companies such as Nielsen Media Research in the United States, or BARB in the UK, is often used as a metric for television advertisement placement, and consequently, for the rates which broadcasters charge to advertisers to air within a given network, television program, or time of day (called a "day-part").

In multiple countries, including the United States, television campaign advertisements are commonplace in a political campaign. In other countries, such as France, political advertising on television is heavily restricted, while some countries, such as Norway, completely ban political advertisements.

The first official paid television advertisement came out in the United States on July 1, 1941, at 2:30 p.m., over New York station WNBT (subsequently WNBC) before a baseball game between the Brooklyn Dodgers and Philadelphia Phillies. The announcement for Bulova watches, for which the company paid anywhere from $4.00 to $9.00 (reports vary), displayed a WNBT test pattern modified to look like a clock with the hands showing the time. The Bulova logo, with the phrase "Bulova Watch Time", appeared in the lower right-hand quadrant of the test pattern while the second hand swept around the dial for one minute. The first TV ad broadcast in the UK went on air on ITV on September 22, 1955, advertising Gibbs SR toothpaste. In Asia, the first TV ad broadcast appeared on Nippon Television in Tokyo on August 28, 1953, advertising Seikosha (subsequently Seiko); it also displayed a clock with the current time.

The television market has grown to such an extent that it was estimated to reach $69.87 billion for TV ad spending in the United States for 2018.

== General background ==
Television advertising involves three main tasks: creating a television advertisement that meets broadcast standards, placing the advertisement on television to reach the desired customer and then measuring the outcomes of these ads, including the return on investment.

To accomplish the first step means different things to different parts of the world depending on the regulations in place. In the UK for example, clearance must be given by the body Clearcast. Another example is Venezuela where clearance is governed by a body called El Centro Nacional Autónomo de la Cinematografía (CNAC). The clearance provides a guarantee to the broadcasters that the content of the advertisement meets legal guidelines. Because of this, special extended clearance sometimes applies to food and medical products as well as gambling advertisements.

The second is the process of TV advertising delivery and usually incorporates the involvement of a post-production house, a media agency, advertising distribution specialists and the end-goal, the broadcasters.

At New York's TV Week in November 2018, the TV advertising model was described by Turner Broadcasting System as broken.

== TV advertisement trends ==
=== Internet and digital ===
Advertising revenue as a percent of US GDP shows a rise in audio-visual and digital advertising at the expense of print media.

However, with the emergence of over-the-top media services, the Internet itself has become a platform for television, and hence TV advertising. TV attribution is a marketing concept whereby the impact television ads have on consumers is measured.

Addressable television is where targeted advertising is used on digital platforms, so two people watching the same show receive different ads.

=== Digital television recorders and advertisement skipping ===
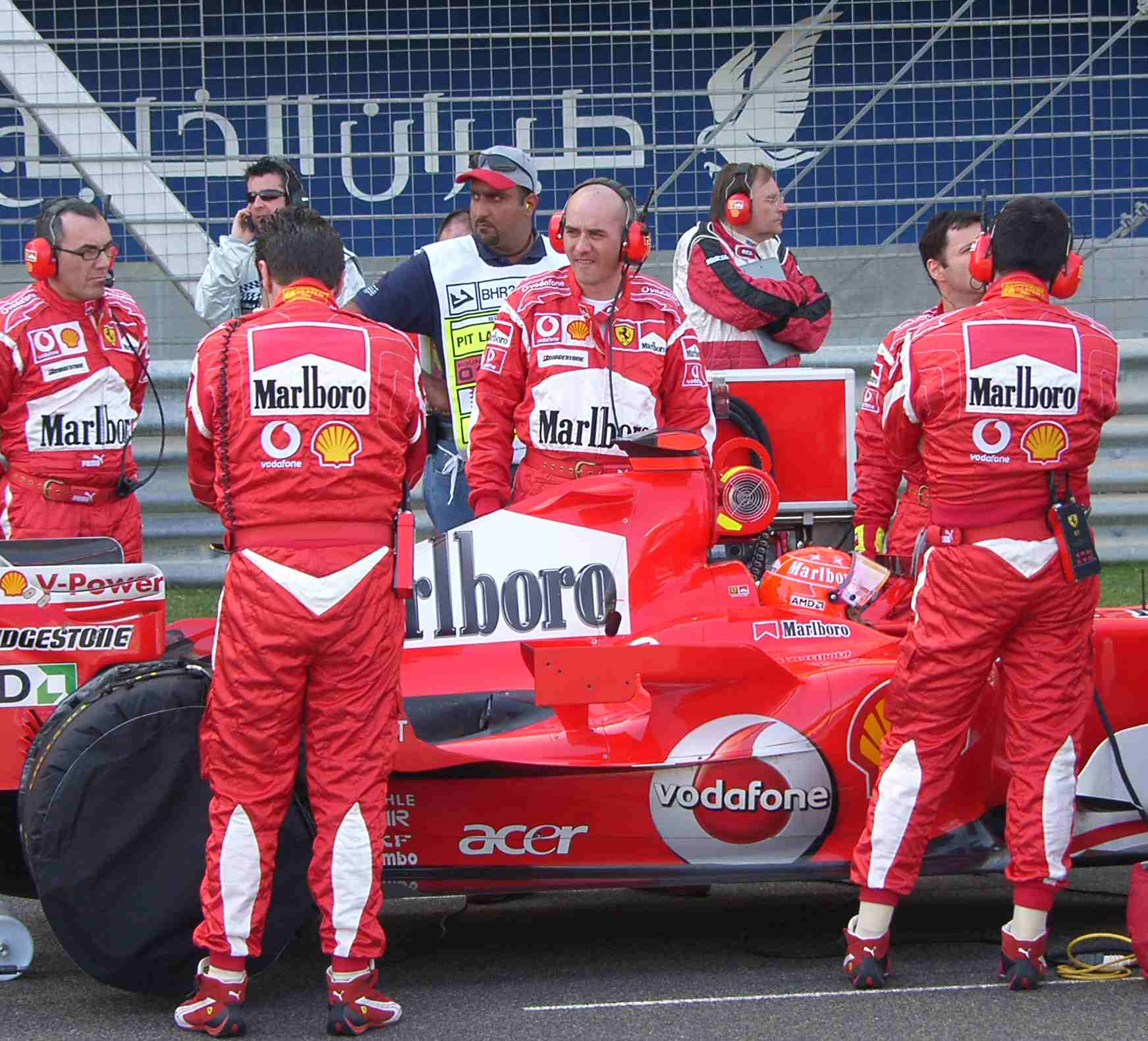
Though advertisements for cigarettes are banned in multiple countries, with the notable exception of Indonesia, such advertising could still be seen in the sponsorship of events such as auto racing during much of the late 20th century and during the 2000s

After the video cassette recorder (VCR) became popular in the 1980s, the television industry began studying the impact of users fast-forwarding through commercials. Advertising agencies fought the trend by making them more entertaining. The introduction of digital video recorders (also known as digital television recorders or DTRs), such as TiVo, and services like Sky+, Dish Network and Astro MAX, which allow the recording of television programs into a hard drive, also enabled viewers to fast-forward or automatically skip through advertisements of recorded programs.

At the end of 2008, 22% of UK households had a DTR. The majority of these households had Sky+ and data from these homes (collected via the SkyView panel of more than 33,000) shows that, once a household gets a DTR, they watch 17% more television. 82% of their viewing is to normal, linear, broadcast TV without fast-forwarding the ads. In the 18% of TV viewing that is time-shifted (i.e. not watched as live broadcast), viewers still watch 30% of the ads at normal speed. Overall, the extra viewing encouraged by owning a DTR results in viewers watching 2% more ads at normal speed than they did before the DTR was installed.

The SkyView evidence is reinforced by studies on actual DTR behaviour by the Broadcasters' Audience Research Board (BARB) and the London Business School.

=== Product placement ===
Other forms of TV advertising include product placement advertising in the TV shows themselves. For example, Extreme Makeover: Home Edition advertises Sears, Kenmore, and the Home Depot by specifically using products from these companies, and some sports events like the Monster Energy Cup of NASCAR are named after sponsors, and race cars are frequently covered in advertisements.Today's sports advertisements frequently push boundaries or test out innovative methods using digital advances, depending less and less on the "spots and dots", the conventional 30-second commercials on television and radio. Additionally, companies are becoming more closely associated with sports content, particularly if it connects them to a digital audience made up mostly of highly sought-after men and women between the ages of 18 and 34. A number of major sporting venues in North America are named for commercial companies, dating back as far as Wrigley Field. Television programs delivered through new mediums such as streaming online video also bring different opportunities to the traditional methods of generating revenue from television advertising.

=== Overlay advertisements ===
Another type of advertisement shown increasingly, mostly for advertising TV shows on the same channel, is an ad overlay at the bottom of the TV screen, which blocks out some of the picture. "Banners", or "Logo Bugs", as they are called, are referred to by media companies as Secondary Events (2E). This is done in much the same way as a severe weather warning is done, only these happen more frequently. They may sometimes take up only 5 to 10 per cent of the screen, but in the extreme, they can take up as much as 25 per cent of the viewing area. Subtitles that are part of the programme content can be completely obscured by banners. Some even make noise or move across the screen. One example is the 2E ads for Three Moons Over Milford, which was broadcast in the months before the TV show's première. A video taking up approximately 25 per cent of the bottom-left portion of the screen would show a comet impacting into the moon with an accompanying explosion, during another television programme. Another example is used in Poland to use any premieres of new shows/new seasons of the same show. TVP has taken a step further, overlaying on screen not only the channel on which the show is premiered, but also on a sister channel.

=== Interactive advertisements ===
Online video directories are an emerging form of interactive advertising, which help in recalling and responding to advertising produced primarily for television. These directories also have the potential to offer other value-added services, such as response sheets and click-to-call, which enhance the scope of the interaction with the brand. Researchers have found that For some consumer types and for specific ad types, that the standard linear advertising format is really superior to interactive advertising. Particularly, they have discovered that a cognitive "matching" of the system's (predominantly visual or verbal) characteristics and the demands of the customer group (preferring their information to be delivered in a visual or verbal fashion) appears to be crucial.

=== Shorter commercial breaks ===
During the 2008–09 TV season, Fox experimented with a new strategy, which the network dubbed "Remote-Free TV". Episodes of Fringe and Dollhouse contained approximately ten minutes of advertisements, four to six minutes fewer than other hour-long programs. Fox stated that shorter commercial breaks keep viewers more engaged and improve brand recall for advertisers, as well as reducing channel surfing and fast-forwarding past the advertisements. However, the strategy was not as successful as the network had hoped and it is unclear whether it will be continued in the future.

In May 2018, Fox Networks Group said its channels would try one-minute commercial breaks, mainly during sports events, but also on some shows on Fox Broadcasting Company. Ads during these breaks would cost more and fewer advertisers would be willing to pay that much. Also in 2018, NBC used one-minute commercial breaks after the first block in multiple shows. These "prime pods" are intended to keep viewers who are watching live, and advertisers pay more for the NBC spots.

=== Children with advertisement ===
Children can be impacted by advertising in a variety of ways, and how they respond to it will depend on a number of factors, including their age, background knowledge, and level of experience. Youngsters under two years old are unable to distinguish between television programs and advertisements; however, children between the ages of three and six can. Children between the ages of 7 and 11 can grasp that they are being sold something, can identify sales tactics, and are willing to buy items with poor selling points, therefore they could also not be able to understand what they are being marketed. Teenagers between the ages of 12 and 13 can typically understand what they are being sold and decide whether they want to purchase it based on what they were told. However, they may not be able to recognize products with tricky placement or understand that celebrities are being paid to endorse a product. Over 14-year-olds could not have the necessary judgment abilities to make a decent purchase and may not comprehend how the market operates.

== Characteristics ==
A McDonald's TV commercial from 1963, which makes use of humor with the Ronald McDonald clown character

Advertising agencies often use humor as a tool in their creative marketing campaigns. Some psychological studies have attempted to demonstrate the effects of humor and their relationship to empowering advertising persuasion.

Animation is often used in advertisements. The pictures can vary from hand-drawn traditional animation to computer animation. By using animated characters, an advertisement may have a certain appeal that is difficult to achieve with actors or mere product displays. Animation also protects the advertisement from changes in fashion that would date it. For this reason, an animated advertisement (or a series of such advertisements) can be long-running, several decades in multiple instances. Notable examples are the series of advertisements for Kellogg's cereals, starring Snap, Crackle and Pop and also Tony the Tiger. The animation is often combined with real actors. Animated advertisements can achieve lasting popularity. In any popular vote for the most memorable television advertisements in the UK, such as on ITV or Channel 4, the top positions in the list invariably include animations, such as the classic Smash and Creature Comforts advertisements.

Other long-running advertising campaigns catch people by surprise, even tricking the viewer, such as the Energizer Bunny advertisement series. It started in the late 1980s as a simple comparison advertisement, where a room full of battery-operated bunnies was seen pounding their drums, all slowing down except one, with the Energizer battery. Years later, a revised version of this seminal advertisement had the Energizer bunny escaping the stage and moving on (according to the announcer, he "keeps going and going and going..."). This was followed by what appeared to be another advertisement: viewers were oblivious to the fact that the following "advertisement" was actually a parody of other well-known advertisements until the Energizer bunny suddenly intrudes on the situation, with the announcer saying "Still going..." (the Energizer Battery Company's way of emphasizing that their battery lasts longer than other leading batteries). This ad campaign lasted for nearly fifteen years. The Energizer Bunny series has itself been imitated by others, via a Coors Light Beer advertisement, in motion pictures, and by current advertisements by GEICO Insurance.

=== Use of popular music ===
Many television advertisements feature songs or melodies ("jingles") or slogans designed to be striking and memorable, which may remain in the minds of television viewers long after the span of the advertising campaign. Some of these ad jingles or catch-phrases may take on lives of their own, spawning gags that appear in films, television shows, magazines, comics, or literature. These long-lasting advertising elements may be said to have taken a place in the pop culture history of the demographic to whom they appeared. An example is the enduring phrase, "Winston tastes good like a cigarette should", from the eighteen-year advertising campaign for Winston cigarettes from the 1950s to the 1970s. Variations of this dialogue and direct references to it appeared as long as two decades after the advertising campaign expired. Another example is "Where's the Beef?", which grew so popular it was used in the 1984 presidential election by Walter Mondale. Another popular catch-phrase is "I've fallen and I can't get up", which still appears occasionally, over two decades after its first use. Some advertising agency executives have originated more than one enduring slogan, such as Mary Wells Lawrence, who is responsible for such famous slogans as "Raise your hand if you're Sure", "I♥New York" and "Trust the Midas touch."

Prior to the 1970s, music in television advertisements was generally limited to jingles and incidental music; on some occasions lyrics to a popular song would be changed to create a theme song or a jingle for a particular product. An example of this is found on the recent popular Gocompare.com advert that utilises "Over There", the 1917 song popular with United States soldiers in both World Wars and written by George M. Cohan during World War I. In 1971 the converse occurred when a song written for a Coca-Cola advertisement was re-recorded as the pop single "I'd Like to Teach the World to Sing (In Perfect Harmony)" by the New Seekers, and became a hit. Additionally songwriter Paul Williams composed a piece for a Crocker Bank commercial which he lengthened and The Carpenters recorded as "We've Only Just Begun". Some pop and rock songs were re-recorded by cover bands for use in advertisements, but the cost of licensing original recordings for this purpose remained prohibitive in certain countries (including the U.S.) until the late 1980s.

The use of previously recorded popular songs in American television advertisements began in earnest in 1985 when Burger King used the original recording of Aretha Franklin's song "Freeway of Love" in a television advertisement for the restaurant. This also occurred in 1987 when Nike used the original recording of the Beatles' song "Revolution" in an advertisement for athletic shoes. Since then, multiple classic popular songs have been used in similar fashion. Songs can be used to concretely illustrate a point about the product being sold (such as Bob Seger's "Like a Rock" used for Chevy trucks), but more often are simply used to associate the good feelings listeners had for the song to the product on display. In some cases the original meaning of the song can be irrelevant or even opposite to the implication of the use in advertising; for example Iggy Pop's "Lust for Life", a song about heroin addiction, has been used to advertise Royal Caribbean International, a cruise ship line. Music-licensing agreements with major artists, especially those that had not previously allowed their recordings to be used for this purpose, such as Microsoft's use of "Start Me Up" by the Rolling Stones and Apple Inc.'s use of U2's "Vertigo" became a source of publicity in themselves.

In early instances, songs were often used over the objections of the original artists, who had lost control of their music publishing, the music of the Beatles being perhaps the most well-known case; more recently artists have actively solicited use of their music in advertisements and songs have gained popularity and sales after being used in advertisements. A famous case is Levi's company, which has used several one hit wonders in their advertisements (songs such as "Inside", "Spaceman", and "Flat Beat"). In 2010, research conducted by PRS for Music revealed that "Light & Day" by The Polyphonic Spree is the most performed song in UK TV advertising.

Sometimes a controversial reaction has followed the use of some particular song on an advertisement. Often the trouble has been that people do not like the idea of using songs that promote values important for them in advertisements. For example, Sly and the Family Stone's anti-racism song, "Everyday People", was used in a car advertisement, which angered some people.

Generic scores for advertisements often feature clarinets, saxophones, or various strings (such as the acoustic/electric guitars and violins) as the primary instruments.

In the late 1990s and early 2000s, electronica music was increasingly used as background scores for television advertisements, initially for automobiles, and later for other technological and business products such as computers and financial services. Television advertising has become a popular outlet for new artists to gain an audience for their work, with some advertisements displaying artist and song information onscreen at the beginning or end.

== Advertisement controversies ==
Several advertisements were banned shortly after being televised due to their controversial nature. In 2005, the notorious "Blood on the Carpet" commercial for Mortal Kombat: Shaolin Monks was pulled for its depicted mutilation. The Snickers commercial featuring Mr. T shooting Snickers at a feminine speed walker was quickly pulled for being homophobic. The Cocoa Pebbles commercial featuring a caricature based on Hulk Hogan was removed after Hogan filed a lawsuit against Post for plagiarizing his image. In 2020, a Match.com commercial depicting a woman dating Satan was only shown once before it was withdrawn; being deemed religiously insensitive. Some advertisements are refused to be shown to the public, such as the risqué AGFA underwater camera commercial that was never televised. In 2012, the Burger King commercial featuring rapper Mary J. Blige received backlash by African-American reviewers after it was previewed on the internet. Yet, it was shelved before being televised.

Controversial advertisements have been observed to be subject to change during the advertised product's lifespan. The slogan for Dr Pepper Ten "It's not for women" was no longer used for subsequent ads after it was deemed too sexist. The slogan for Kotex "Kotex fits. Period." (later advertisements featured the CG anthropomorphic "Red Dot") was terminated from subsequent ads as of 2005 due to the slogan's term "period", referring to both punctuation and menstruation, was taken as a result of verbal abuse due to being publicized in front of children, which harmed sales of the product. Commercials on children's underwear, such as Underoos, featuring clad child models had since gained criticism by parents due to concerns of child sexual exploitation, removing children from the advertisements in that matter, not limited to advertisements for baby diapers. The Bud Light mascot, Spuds MacKenzie, was removed from the advertisements after their two-year lifespan in 1989 due to the accusations of their negative influence by using a Bull Terrier to advertise alcoholic beverages. The Mac Tonight mascot made minimal appearances before retiring from the McDonald's commercials due to the theme song "Mack the Knife" infringing upon the likeness of Bobby Darin, and being sued by his son, Dodd Mitchell Darin, in 1989. Additionally, the long-time McDonald's mascot, Ronald McDonald, was retired from advertisement after 53 years in 2016, not only due to the wake of the clown scare, but also since it had been suggested by 550 physicians five years earlier that Ronald should retire from the advertisements. They stated that "a clown mascot targeting children for fast food is unethical".

== See also ==
- Advertising adstock
- Attack ad
- Direct response television
- FAST marketing
- Jingle
- Promo (media)
- Promotion (marketing)
- Television consumption
- Thinkbox
- Upfront (advertising)
