= Transit media =

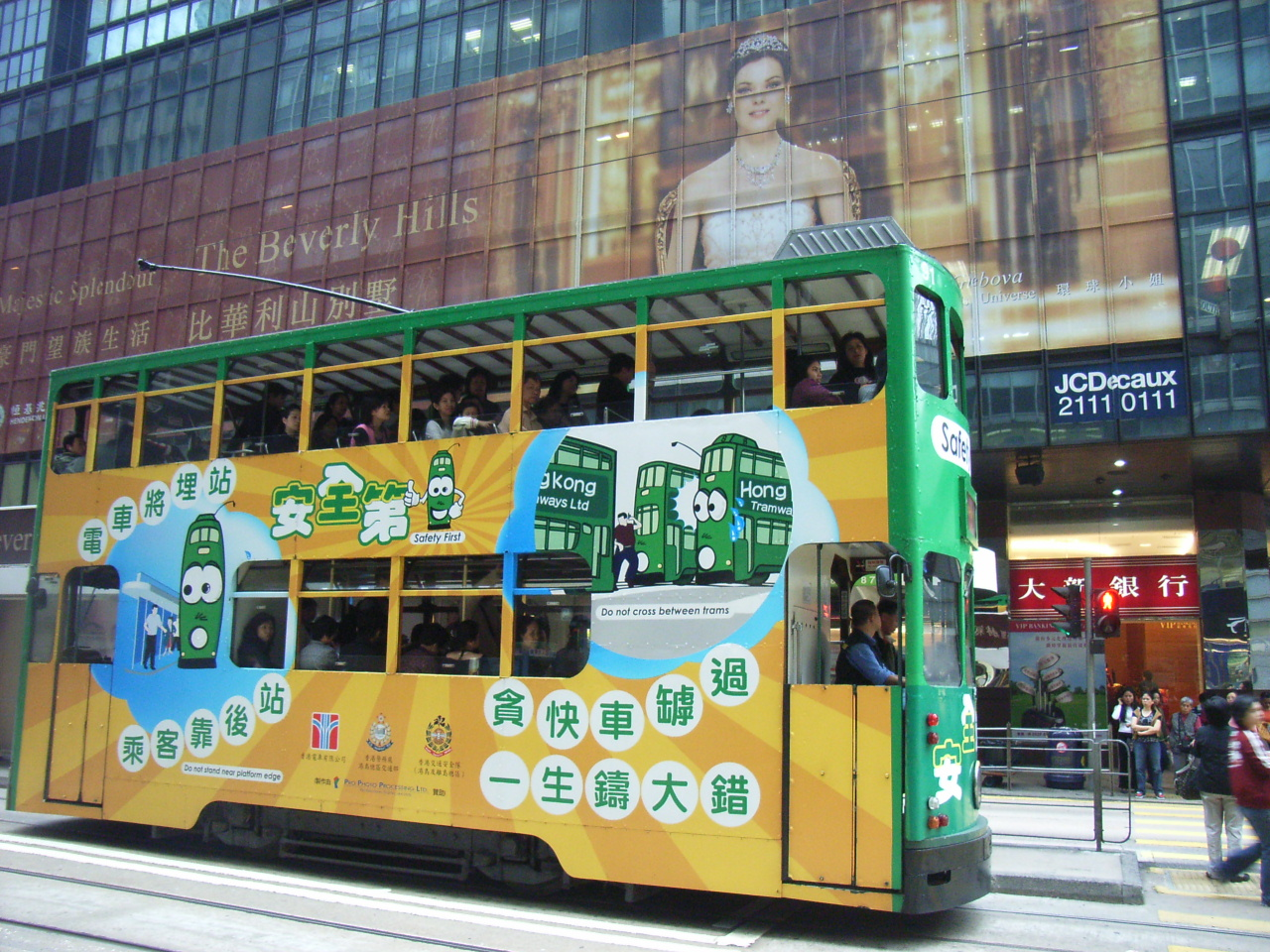
Example of Transit Media in Hong Kong

Transit media is a form of out-of-home advertising that displays advertisements in or on the outside of vehicles, such as on the side of or above the seats of a bus or tram.

== Advertising medium ==
Transit media used to consist of paper or paint, but LED panels may be used, allowing advertisements to be rotated or scheduled by GPS location, enabling advertisers to target specific audiences. The medium offers a balance between traditional billboards and smaller, more mobile signage. For example, an individually branded car might be casually driven around a city for the majority of the time, but can occasionally be integrated into a multi-vehicle convoy or parked arrangement suitable for promotional activities.

== See also ==
- Bus advertising
- Driven media
- Fleet media
- Mobile billboard
- Out-of-home advertising
- Transport economics
- Truckside advertisement
- Vehicle vinyl wrap
