= Window film =

Film installed on glass surfaces

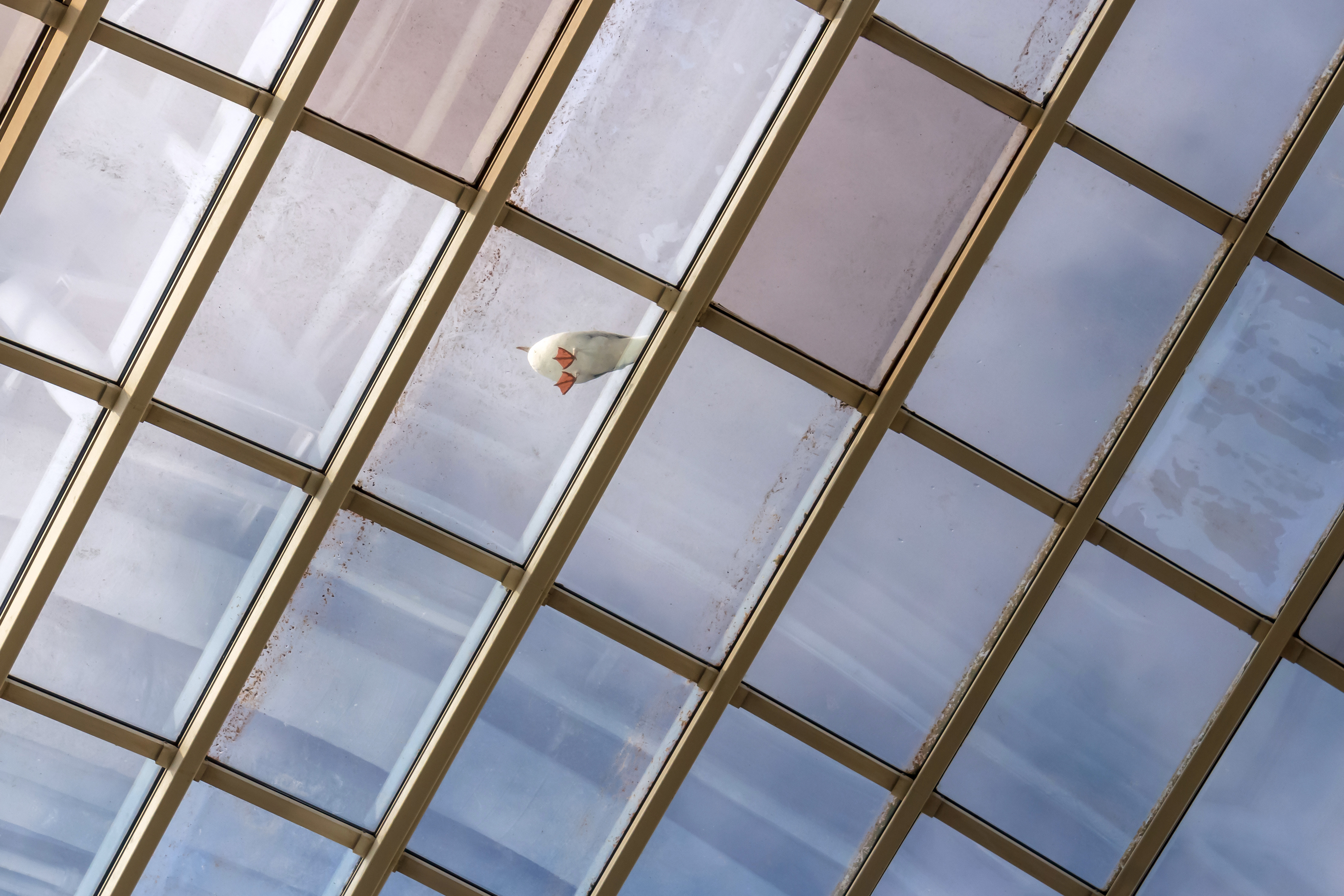
Different kinds of sun protection film on a glass ceiling

A window film, sometimes called window tint, is a thin laminate film that can be installed on the interior or exterior of glass surfaces in automobiles and boats, as well as on the interior or exterior of glass in homes and office buildings. It is usually made from polyethylene terephthalate (PET), a thermoplastic polymer resin of the polyester family, due to its clarity, tensile strength, dimensional stability, and ability to accept a variety of surface-applied or embedded treatments.

Window films are generically categorized by their construction components (dyed, pigmented, metallized, ceramic, or nano), by their intended use (automotive, marine or architectural), by substrate type (glass or polycarbonate), and/or by their technical performance (privacy, solar control, safety and security).

Window film is normally installed by professional service companies or installers, but DIY kits are also widely available.

The International Window Film Association, founded in 1991, provides unbranded information about window films.

== Uses ==
There are many different grades, shades, colors, and thicknesses of available window films built to offer solutions to a variety of challenges. Window films are a retrofit upgrade for existing glass that can be used to address problems inherent to glazing, including:

- Heat and glare reduction
- Thermal insulation
- UV filtration
- Protection from UV Rays
- Safety and security
- Privacy
- Decoration, signage and branding
- Protection from graffiti
- Automotive styling
- Interior or exterior decorative
- Protect car in summer from overheat

Window films are an extremely cost-effective method to reduce heating and cooling costs in existing buildings by reducing the amount of heat transfer through glazing.

== Primary properties ==
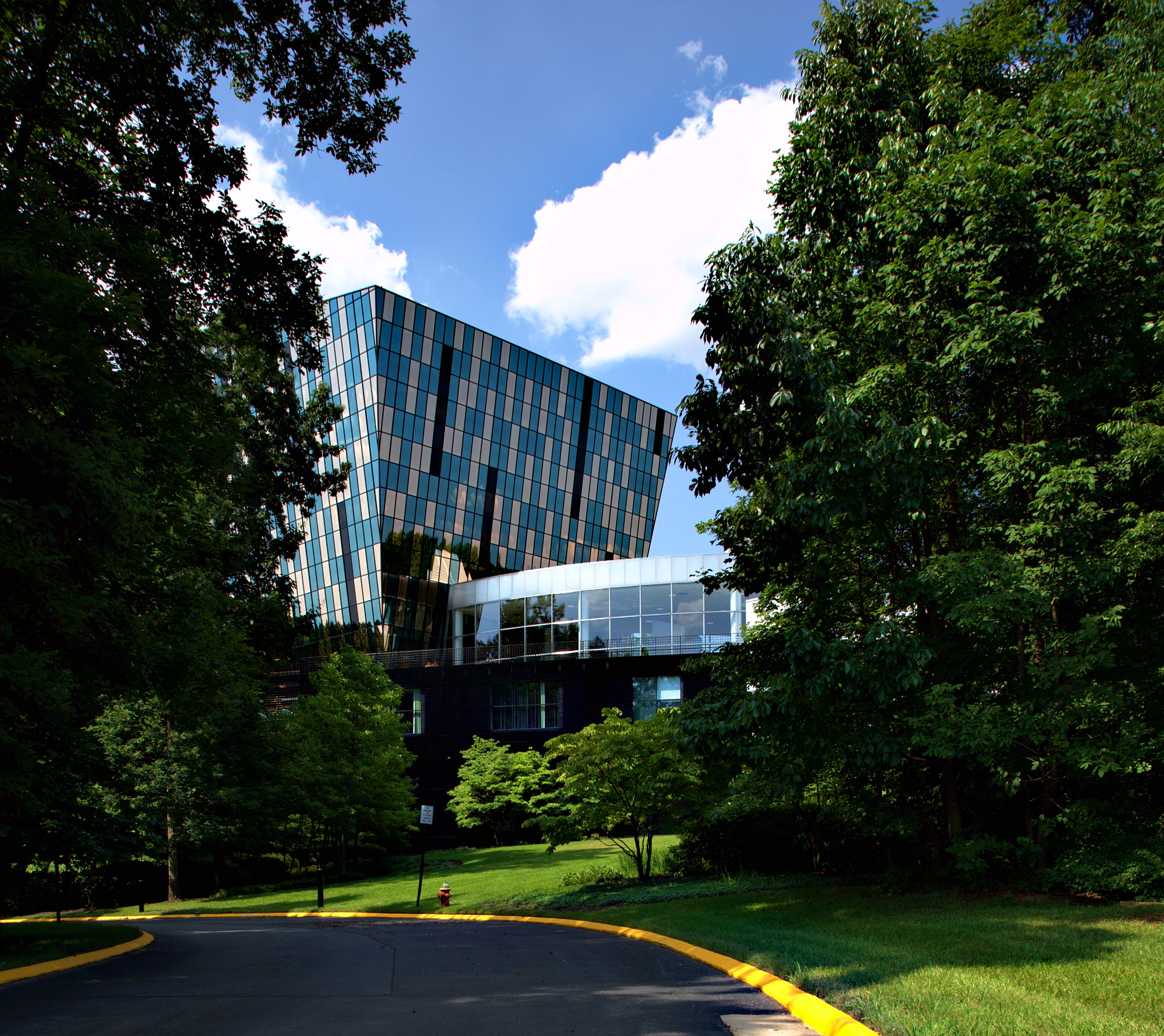
The colorful film on these windows gives the building a unique appearance while providing privacy and insulation from the sun.

Heat rejection films are normally applied to the interior of flat glass windows to reduce the amount of infrared, visible light, and ultraviolet (UV) radiation entering the windows. Such films are usually dyed or metallized (which can be transparent to visible light) to convert incoming solar radiation to infrared radiation, which is then rejected back through the glass to the exterior. Modern window film technology has created ceramic window films that are non-metallic and do not contain dyes that can result in discoloration. The ceramic and metallic window films usually cost 50-100+ percent more than regular window film but they can reduce energy transmission by as much as 80 percent. Ceramic window films cost slightly more but provide a substantial increase by reflecting and absorbing infrared radiation (IR or radiant heat).

To keep the sun's heat out of the house, a low-emissivity coating should be applied to the outside pane of glazed windows. If the windows are designed to provide heat energy in the winter and keep heat inside the house (typical of cold climates), the low-emissivity coating should be applied to the inside pane of glazed windows. Such films also reduce the amount of visible and ultraviolet radiation entering a window, and are often applied to reduce the fading of the contents of a room. Silvered film may also be employed to the same end. Spectrally selective films act by blocking certain wavelengths of the sun's infrared radiation and reject heat without reducing natural light.

Security films are applied to glass so when the glass is broken it holds together, preventing dangerous shards from flying about, or making it more difficult for an intruder to gain entry. Typically applied to commercial glass, these films are made of heavy-gauge plastic and are intended to maintain the integrity of glass when subject to heavy impact. The most robust security films are capable of preventing fragmentation and the production of hazardous glass shards from forces such as bomb blasts. Some companies have even experimented with bullet ballistics and multiple layers of security film. Another key application for security window films (safety window films) is on large areas of "flat glass" such as storefront windows, sliding glass doors, and larger windows that are prone to hurricane damage. These security films, if applied properly, can also provide protection for vehicles. These security films are often tinted and can be up to 400 micrometers (μm) thick, compared to less than 50 μm for ordinary tint films. If anchored correctly, they can also provide protection for architectural glazing in the event of an explosion. A layer of film (of 100 μm thickness or greater) can prevent the ejection of spall when a projectile impacts on its surface, which otherwise creates small dagger-like shards of glass that can cause injury.

Switchable films can be switched from opaque to clear by a safe voltage under 36V AC. In its opaque state, it can be perfectly used as a projection screen that is viewable from both sides. 3G switchable film also has UV (100%) and IR (94%) blocking functions and security function.

Graphic design films are generally colored vinyl or frosted. Frosted finish films closely resemble sandblasted or acid-etched glass, while vinyl films are available in a range of colors. Both types of films are commonly used in commercial applications.

Privacy films reduce visibility through the glass. Privacy film for flat-glass commercial and residential applications may be silvered, offering an unimpeded view from the low-light side but virtually no view from the high-light side. It may also be frosted, rendering the window translucent but not transparent. Privacy films for automobiles are available in gradients of darkness, with the darker tints commonly known as "limo tint."

Correctly applied mirror film can create one-way mirrors. Note that in order to be effective, the light differential must be 6–0 times greater to maintain the intended performance. For example, during the day, buildings with tinted windows are difficult to see into, but at night, the windows become much easier to see through.

Other benefits include protection for passengers in the rear of automobiles, protection from UV rays (which have some harmful effects), cooling for pets, greater privacy, reduced chance of theft (because valuables are less visible), reduced glare and reflection on liquid crystal display (LCD) screens, and protection for those who have conditions involving photosensitivity or skin sensitivity, such as lupus (SLE). Window film is also considered more effective and practical than stick-on blinds.

=== UV filtering to reduce fading ===
Protection from UV light can be accomplished by a film that addresses only the UV spectrum. As UV is one of the main sources of fading, it can prolong the life of fixtures and fittings. Basic colorless clear films reject (absorb) some UV radiation up to 380 nm, and depending on the manufacturer, UV inhibitors are added to the polyester, with specialist films offering protection to 400 nm. Tinted films are necessary for protection to 500 nm.

Window films filter out over 99% of UV rays at 380 nm, reducing the main factor in fading. However, additional factors such as solar heat, visible light, humidity, and presence or absence of chemical vapors also contribute to fading. Therefore, the greatest protection from fading is offered by tinted or metallized window films that reject large levels of heat and visible light, in addition to UV.

== Selection of window film ==
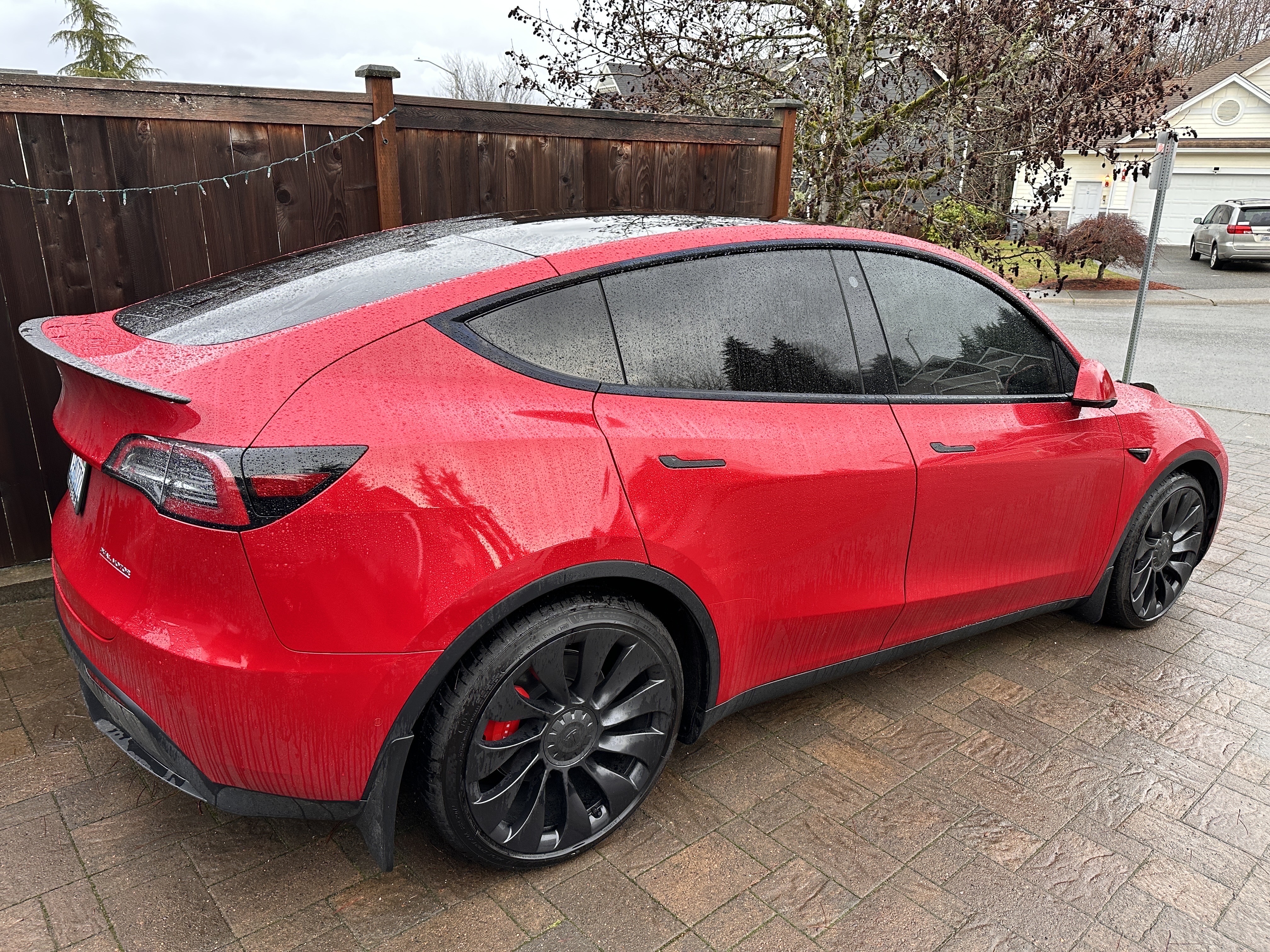
SUV with tinted windows at 20% all around

Not all films are suitable for all glass. The absorptance of the glass and the film, the size of the pane, the thickness of the glass, the construction of the window should be considered in terms of single pan-, insulated glass, treated (with a low-emissivity coating), laminated or toughened.

Advice on the appropriate selection of film for the glass is vital to ensure that the glass does not crack as a result of thermal stress. However, it is possible that a pane of glass may break subsequent to the application of an appropriate film, because the pane has been damaged during the glazing of the window, or as a result of movement of the building or other physical stresses that are not apparent at the time of the application of the film.

Glass may crack subsequent to the application of sign writing or if heavy, thermally efficient drapes are hung close to the glass, particularly if the edges of the glass are damaged.

The chances of glass breakage occurring subsequent to the application of film or sign writing or the hanging of drapes, are very small. However, breakage can occur and it is impossible to predict the edge condition of the glass without removing it from the frame, an approach that is not practical.

=== Thermal properties ===
Heating and cooling systems have energy costs, and window films can be used to increase building insulation. Modern windows with low-solar-gain glass do not need retrofit films, but since most of the existing windows do not have a low solar heat gain, window films make a lot of sense as a retrofit energy improvement. They can provide thermal comfort and are one of the most cost-competitive and environmentally-friendly energy improvements, especially in hot and mixed climates.

== Unintended features ==
Under certain conditions, window film will exhibit iridescence also known as thin film Interference (TFI) and is well known in the aviation industry. TFI essentially refers to colours gradually changing as the angle of view or the angle of illumination changes. This phenomenon usually occurs at night, when the source of illumination within a building is fluorescent lighting. The amount of iridescence may vary from almost imperceptible to very visible. It most frequently occurs when the film is constructed with scratch resistance protection. When iridescence does occur in window film, the best way to stop it is to prevent the fluorescent light from illuminating the film or to use an alternative type of light.

== Building use ==
Window tints can be used in applications like shopfront windows, office block windows, and house windows. This is often done to increase privacy, and decrease heating and cooling costs. Window tints are used in some energy efficient buildings.

Window films are also used to apply see-through graphics to glass and other transparent surfaces, to provide advertising, branding, signage and decoration. See-through graphics are most commonly applied using a perforated window film with a graphic visible from one side but not the other side, which remains see-through. Vehicle wraps on buses are perhaps the widest application of see-through graphics.

== Certification and standards ==
The thicker window films known as safety and security window film are designed to perform under extreme conditions, and as such there are specific standard criteria these films should meet, such as American standards ANSI Z.97, CPSC 16 CFR 1201, Cat II (400 ft-lb), and the British Standards BS 6206 (Class A, B, C). The European Committee for Standardization offer the EN12600 standard Classification of Resistance of Glazing to Impact. Often, building codes dictate that a film must have a report verifying that it has met at least one of these standards.

Solar window film is usually subject to less critical testing. However, standards are in place to maintain a level of quality in the industry. The ANSI Standards ASTM E903 and ASTM D1044-93 relate to the solar/UV transmission properties and abrasion resistance, respectively. The larger window film manufacturers use these standards to guarantee the quality of their raw materials and finished products.

== Regulations for automotive use ==
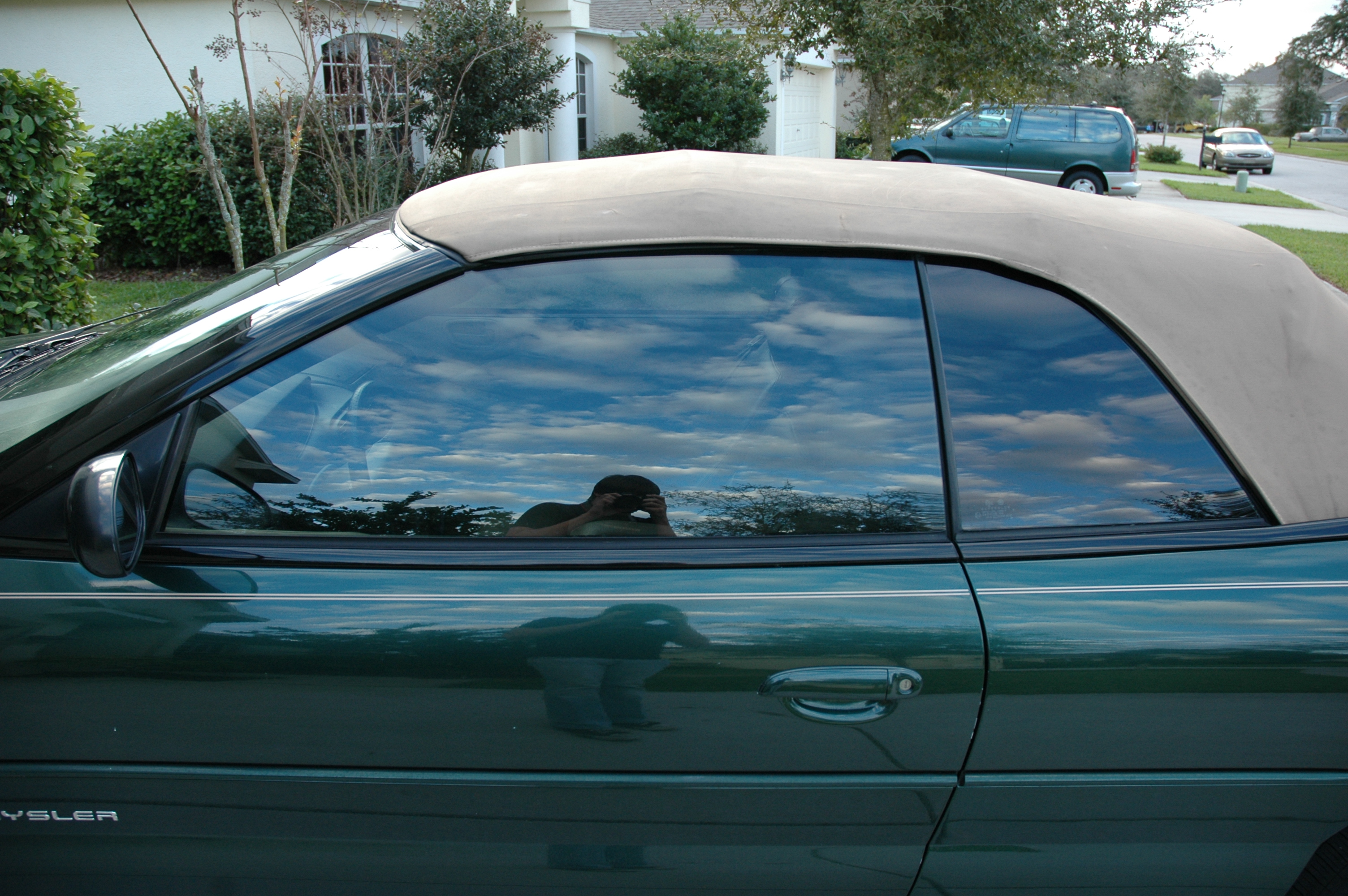
Window tint on a convertible in America. Tint on the front window is lighter than on the back window because of window tint laws.

Photo of vehicle with illegal window tint being measured at 2% light transmittance.

Automobile window tinting reduces the "visible light transmission" (VLT) through car windows. This can be problematic at night, or when motorists must be able to see through the windows of other vehicles in order to spot hazards. Police also may want to be able to identify the passengers or any potential threat inside a vehicle. Therefore, in many jurisdictions, there are laws to restrict the darkness of tinting.

=== Factory tint ===
"Factory tint", done at the time of manufacture is generally not an applied film, but instead is done by dyeing the inside of the glass with a darkened pigment during glass manufacturing, an electrical process known as "deep dipping." The pigment gives the glass a tint, but doesn't provide UV ray protection or heat rejection like most window films do. The average VLT of factory tint is between 15 and 26%.

=== Regulation by country ===
- Australia— In New South Wales, Transport for NSW permits VLT of 35% on windows other than the windscreen. Tint on the windscreen – a band across the top is permitted with a depth of no more than 10% of the depth of the windscreen. An exception to the side and rear window tinting regulations applies to cars tinted before 1 August 1994.
- Belarus— Any kind of window tint is illegal. An exception is made for factory tint in vehicles purchased before 1 April 2006. Also exempt are vehicles of cash collectors, KGB and certain officials.
- Canada— Automobile tinting laws are set at the provincial level which range from 50% VLT for Manitoba to 70% for Quebec and Yukon. But most provinces including Ontario and British Columbia do not allow tint in the front side windows.
- Hong Kong— The rules adjusted in April 2023 by Transport Department allows for 70% VLT in front windscreen and front side windows. Other windows not in driver's compartment(rear windows and rear windscreen) allowed up to 44% VLT.
- India— The rules governing tinted glass are defined in The Motor Vehicles Act 1988, which states that the front and rear windshield should be 70% VLT and all other windows are limited at 50% VLT. On 27 April 2012, the Supreme Court of India ordered all black films to be removed.
- Iran- In November 2021, it was legalized by Court of Iranian Administrative justice
- Italy— Window tinting is permitted on rear windows and rear windshield only, with no limits on films graduation. A professional installer certificate is also required, and it is necessary to keep visible the film's brand and homologation number on the windows.
- Lebanon— The Lebanese traffic law does not permit private vehicle owners to tint their front windows (driver window, front passenger window and windshield) without a window film license acquired by the Lebanese defense ministry, nevertheless, it is permitted to tint rear windows up to 0% as no limits are cited. If a private vehicle owner is caught without a window film license, charges will depend on the situation he/she was caught in (100000LBP fine if caught by the Internal Security Forces).
- Malaysia— According to Malaysia's former Transport Minister, Anthony Loke, motorists can now tint their rear windshields and passenger windows as dark as they want. Starting from 8 May 2019, the permissible VLT (Visible Light Transmission) levels are 70% for the front windscreen, 50% for the front side windows, and 0% for the rear side windows and rear windscreen.
- Malta— The Malta Transport Authority Permits VLT of 70% on Front Side windows. Tint on the windscreen – a band across the top is permitted with a depth of no more than 100mm of the depth of the windscreen. 30% on the rear and side windows.
- New Zealand— The NZ Transport Agency stipulates that private motor vehicles must have at least 35% VLT after film has been applied. Side and rear windows; including the windows next to the driver; are allowed full coverage. The front windshield may have an anti-glare band no lower than the extended sun visors. There is no concise regulation for a sunroof. There is an exception for factory tinted glass, which may be any VLT level. Also, commercial goods vehicles are allowed any level of VLT on windows behind the driver, provided the driver has adequate rear vision via side mirrors.
- Russia— Window tinting limits are specified in GOST 5727–88. The limit is 75% for the front windshield (a darker stripe no wider than 10 cm is allowed at the very top) and 70% for the front side windows. Tinting of back windows is not regulated. In practice, however, bribes are often used to pass inspection or avoid road police tickets even with illegal tint.
- Singapore— In Singapore, front windscreen and front side windows must have at least 70% VLT. Tint installed in front windscreen must not affect the transmission of signals between the In-vehicle Unit (IU) and the Electronic Road Pricing (ERP) gantry. Rear side windows and rear windscreen must have at least 50% VLT.
- South Korea— In South Korea, front windscreen must have at least 70% VLT, and front side windows must have at least 40% VLT. There is no regulation for rear side windows and rear windscreen. But in South Korea, it is rare to find a vehicle that complies. Moreover, there is no crackdown. Because of this, South Korea has a high risk of traffic accidents occurring at night. Also, it's difficult to crack down on various illegal activities in vehicles in South Korea due to too dark tinting.
- United Arab Emirates— Previously, window tinting was banned in the UAE. Then the law was changed and 30 per cent was allowed. In 2017, the Federal Traffic Law was revised again. Since then, drivers have been allowed to tint their windows to 50 per cent. However, taxis and trucks are not allowed to tint their windows to 50 per cent.
- United Kingdom— Regulations set forth by the Vehicle & Operator Services Agency under the Road Vehicles (Construction and Use) Regulations 1986 state that the front windscreen can have no less than 75 percent VLT and the front side windows no less than 70 percent. For vehicles registered prior to 1 April 1985, the front windscreen and front side windows must allow a minimum of 70% visible light through. British police are increasingly cracking down on illegal tinting on vehicles although window tints are not checked on the annual MoT Test.
- United States— Each state has different limits of allowable tint as measured on the front side windows. These range from a low VLT of 24% in Washington, to 88% in California, with less stringent restriction being common for windows in the rear of the vehicle. Full details of glazing and sticker laws can be found at the Federal Motor Carrier Safety Administration website.

== See also ==
- One-way mirror
- Smoked glass
- Smart glass
- Window insulation film
