= One-way mirror =

Glass that allows people on one side to see those on the other but not vice versa

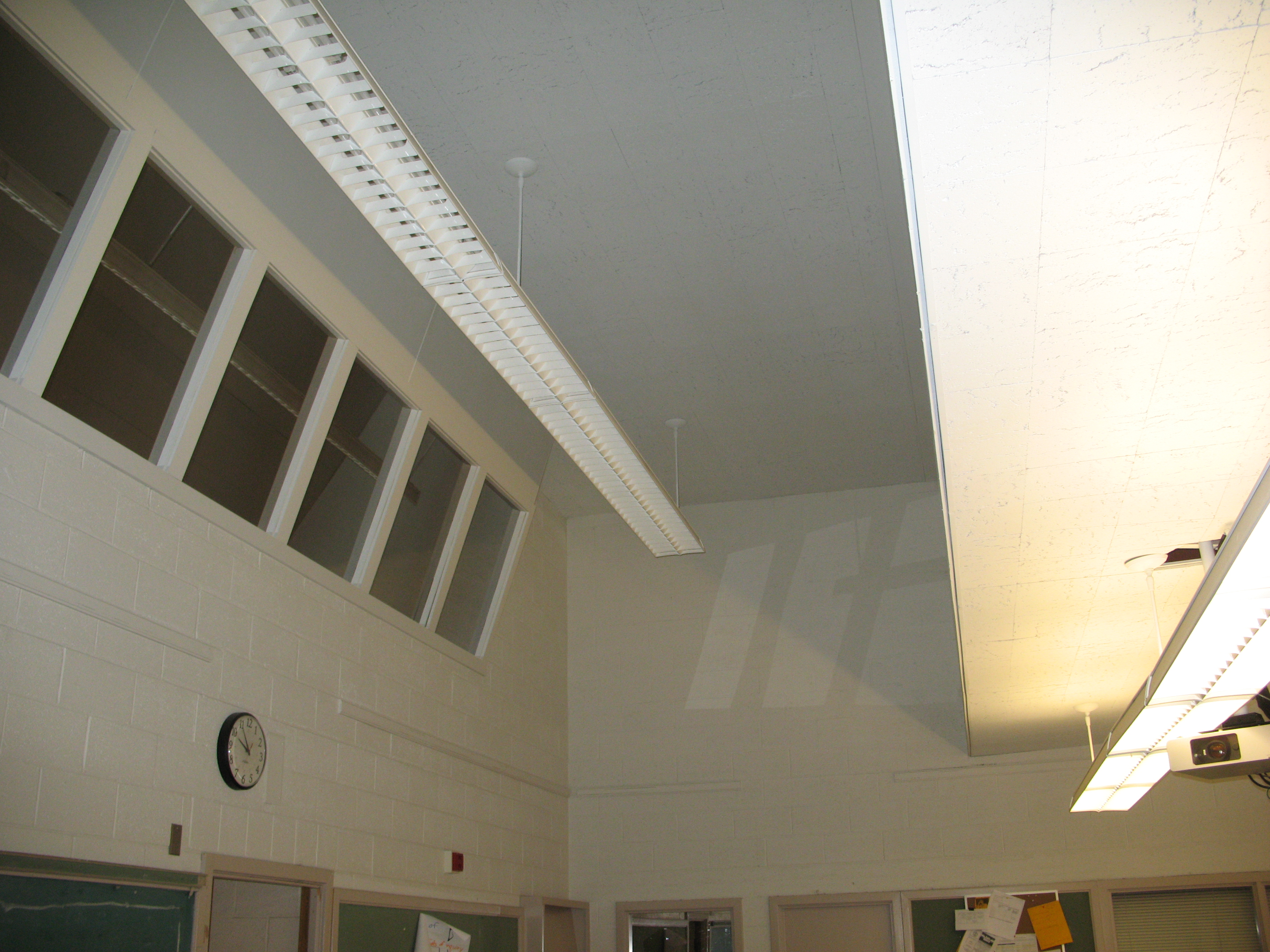
One-way mirrors for upper-level observation deck viewing down into a classroom (University of Wisconsin-Eau Claire)

A one-way mirror, also called two-way mirror (or one-way glass, half-silvered mirror, and semi-transparent mirror), is a mirror that appears reflective from one side and transparent from the other. The perception of one-way transmission is easily achievable when one side of the mirror is brightly lit and the other side is dark. This allows viewing from the darkened side but not vice versa.

== History ==
The first U.S. Patent for a one-way mirror was submitted in 1903, then named a "transparent mirror".

== Principle of operation ==
Principle of operation of a one-way mirror showing that both parties predominantly see the person on the bright side

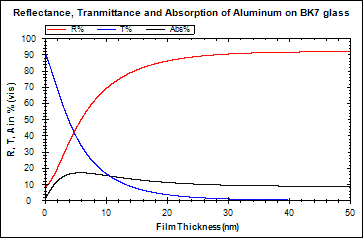
The optical properties of the mirror can be tuned by changing the thickness of the reflecting layer.

The glass is coated with, or has been encased within, a thin and almost transparent layer of metal (window film usually containing aluminium). The result is a mirrored surface that reflects some light and is penetrated by the rest. Light always passes equally in both directions. However, when one side is brightly lit and the other kept dark, the darker side becomes difficult to see from the brightly lit side because it is masked by the much brighter reflection of the lit side.

== Applications ==
One-way glass (4) used in a teleprompter

A one-way mirror is typically used as an apparently normal mirror in a brightly lit room, with a much darker room on the other side. People on the brightly lit side see their own reflection—it looks like a normal mirror. People on the dark side see through it—it looks like a transparent window. The light from the bright room reflected from the mirror back into the room itself is much greater than the light transmitted from the dark room, overwhelming the small amount of light transmitted from the dark to the bright room; conversely, the light reflected back into the dark side is overwhelmed by the light transmitted from the bright side. This allows a viewer in the dark side to observe the bright room covertly.

When such mirrors are used for one-way observation, the viewing room is kept dark by a darkened curtain or a double door vestibule. These observation rooms have been used in:

- Execution chambers
- Experimental psychology research
- Interrogation rooms
- Market research
- Reality television, as in the series Big Brother, which makes extensive use of one-way mirrors throughout its set to allow cameramen in special black hallways to use movable cameras to film contestants without being seen.
- Security observation decks in public areas
- Train driver or conductor compartments in newer metro trains, such as Bombardier Transportation's Movia family of metro trains, including the Toronto Rocket

Smaller versions are sometimes used in:

- Low-emissivity windows on vehicles and buildings
- Mobile phone and tablet screen covers, enabling the screen to be used as a mirror when it is off
- Security cameras, where the camera is hidden in a mirrored enclosure
- Stage effects (particularly Pepper's ghost)
- Teleprompters, where they allow a presenter to read from text projected onto glass directly in front of a film or television camera
- Common setups of an infinity mirror illusion
- Smart mirror (virtual mirror) and mirror TV
- Arcade video games, such as Taito's Space Invaders

A trailer with special windows for wildlife observation

The same type of mirror, when used in an optical instrument, is called a beam splitter and works on the same principle as a pellicle mirror. A partially transparent mirror is also an integral part of the Fabry–Pérot interferometer.

== See also ==
- Optical isolator
- See-through graphics
- Window film
