= See-through graphics =

Window films that allow seeing from the interior

See-through graphics can be added to glass or other transparent panels to provide advertising, branding, architectural expression, one-way privacy and solar control.

See-through graphics on the outside of a window

See-through graphics: the view outside is unobstructed

Perforated self-adhesive window films are often used to create see-through graphics. A graphic is printed on the front side of the film which contains circular holes (perforations) covering up to fifty percent of the surface area. The eye focuses on light reflecting from the printed colors of the graphic rather than light passing through the perforations. The other side of the film is usually black to create a one-way effect (the graphic on the front side is not visible). From this side the view through the film is dominant because the black layer absorbs more light than is reflected.

See-through graphics can also be printed onto transparent non-perforated surfaces. This is achieved by printing layers of dot or line patterns (maintaining areas of transparency between the printed areas) on top of each other in exact registration or with minimum overlap. For example, the first printed layer might be black dots followed by a layer of colored dots for the image or graphic.

== History ==
There is evidence that one-way window blinds were used in 18th century London. The blinds were made from canvas, silk or wire mesh which was painted on one side. The product was advertised by a tradesman called John Brown in 1726. Painted window screens were also found in the US city of Baltimore from 1913. The screens were made from a woven wire mesh. They provided decoration to house fronts, privacy to those inside while maintaining the view out.

Perforated films were sold in the 1970s and 1980s as sun blinds for vehicles and buildings. This was cited in the first patent application for see-through graphics. The blinds had brightly colored and reflective front sides. The reverse side was a non-reflective black color which allowed good visibility through the blind.

See-through graphics were used in 1982 on the Safe Screen Squash Court, the world's first squash court with four unobstructed one-way vision walls. The one-way effect was created by printing transparent walls with two or more layers of dots in exact registration(without any overlap). Spectators could see into the illuminated court (past a layer of black dots visible from the outside) but the players cannot see past the white or colored dot patterns which are visible from inside.

Roland Hill, the designer of the Safe Screen Squash Court, filed the first patent for See-through graphics in 1984, which covered the use of perforated window films for see-through graphics. The company Contra Vision Ltd was launched in 1985 by Hill to commercialize the various see-through graphics technologies and patents. A second patent for see-through graphics was filed by Hill to cover translucent print patterns, which can be illuminated from either side.

The world's first "full wrap" bus was completed in New Zealand in 1991. A number of competing manufacturers of Perforated Window Film entered the market in the 1990s, including licensees of Contra Vision Ltd such as 3M, Avery Dennison and Continental Graphics.

See-through graphics as a product category was recognized on the Travelling Museum of British invention. The windows of the bus were wrapped in see-through graphics and the product was one of a hundred British innovations which were showcased inside. See-through graphics was also recognized by the Design Council as a best of British Millennium product.

== Production ==
See-through graphics are most commonly produced on large format printers using solvent inkjet or uv print technology. Material comes on rolls typically up to 1.53m wide and 50m long. The material has an adhesive back which allows it to be fitted to the exterior of windows.

Several manufacturers produce different grades of one-way-vision film. An 80:20 has 80% material and 20% hole and is best for retail windows where the light inside the building may well be brighter than the outside at certain times. At the other end of the scale Transport For London (TFL) specify that a 50:50 One Way Vision Film with a 1.5mm hole must be used on taxi and minicab windows.

== Applications ==
See-through graphics are used for Out of Home (OOH) advertising campaigns as part of vehicle wraps on buses, trams and the back window of taxis. It is also used for advertising on static sites such as telephone kiosks, bus shelters and on glass windows and partitions in airports and other transport hubs. The main benefit is that advertisers can install larger and more impactful graphics which cover windows as well as standard walls. There are a number of tips and tricks to ensure a successful "window wrap".

Point of Purchase (PoP)/Point of Sale (PoS) advertisements, ranging from poster size to total windows and door advertisements, are used at retail locations to promote the sale of goods.

Building wraps are another application of see-through graphics, converting buildings into advertising billboards.

Architectural glass applications cover both exterior window glazing and interior design on doors and partitions. See-through graphics add unique character to the outside of buildings, while providing privacy and solar control benefits to those inside.

A novel application is to apply see-through graphics to sunglasses for promotional purposes.

== Lighting considerations ==
The level of illumination on either side on the window is important to ensure the best effect. Typically a higher level of illumination is needed on the side with the printed graphics to ensure they are seen prominently and the view through to the other side is obscured. Depending upon the nature of the design itself and the level of illumination to either side of the panel, the design either obscures through vision or the observer can choose to focus upon the design or objects on the other side of the panel.
