= Mamun Chowdhury =

Bangladeshi-born British businessman (born 1961)

Mamunur Rashid Chowdhury
- মামুনুর রশিদ চৌধুরী
- Born: Mamunur Rashid Chowdhury; 19 November 1961 (age 64); Moynabad, Chunarughat, Habiganj, East Pakistan (now Bangladesh)
- Occupation: Businessman
- Years active: 1990s–present
- Title: Founder and co-director of London Tradition
- Spouse: Jahanara Chowdhury
- Website: www.mamunchowdhury.com

Mamunur Rashid Chowdhury (Bengali: মামুনুর রশিদ চৌধুরী; born 19 November 1961) is a Bangladeshi-born British businessman, and founder and co-director of London Tradition.

== Early life ==
Chowdhury is of Bangladeshi origin from the village of Moynabad of Chunarughat in Habiganj, Sylhet District, East Pakistan (now Bangladesh). Having completed his education in Bangladesh, after a short period in the Middle East, Mamun arrived in London in December 1991. From 1993 to 2013, he lived in Poplar, Tower Hamlets before moving to Redbridge.

== Career ==
In 1994, Chowdhury began his career in the United Kingdom establishing London Clothing Limited, importing ready-made garments from Bangladesh and selling to clients in the UK and rest of Europe. This was supported by setting up his own factory to manufacture garments in the UK.

In 1996, he changed his business model and focused only on high-end outerwear and worked with some of UK's top designers. He concentrated on making British traditional outerwear, including duffle coats. In 1998, his business was large enough to provide opportunities for fashion students to gain work experience.

Chowdhury used his designing skills to design and develop his own range. In January 2001, he set up London Tradition with Rob Huson, a city fashion Executive, designing and manufacturing luxury duffle coats. The company now exports 40,000 to 50,000 coats a year, 90% of its output, and has seen overseas sales rise by 865% between 2007 and 2013. In July 2014, the company was awarded a Queen's Award for Enterprise for International Trade in recognition of its business performance. Chowdhury was invited to meet with Queen Elizabeth II at a Buckingham Palace reception party.

== See also ==
- British Bangladeshi
- Business of British Bangladeshis
- List of British Bangladeshis
