= The Queen's Award for Enterprise: International Trade (Export) (2014) =

The Queen's Award for Enterprise: Sustainable Development (International Trade Export) (2014) was awarded on 21 April 2014, by Queen Elizabeth II.

The following organisations were awarded this year:

== Recipients ==
=== A-E ===
- Abbey Forged Products Ltd, Sheffield
- Aero Stanrew Ltd, Barnstaple, Devon
- Airbus Operations Ltd, Filton, Bristol
- Alco Valves Group, Brighouse, West Yorks
- All3Media International Ltd London
- Ampetronic Ltd, Newark, Nottinghamshire
- A-Safe (UK) Ltd Elland, West Yorks
- Axis Productions Ltd, Glasgow, Scotland
- Bute Fabrics Ltd, Argyll and Bute, Scotland
- Cambridge English Language Assessment, Cambridge
- CarnaudMetalbox Engineering Ltd Shipley, W. Yorks
- Carradice of Nelson Ltd Nelson, Lancashire
- Caterpillar (UK) Ltd, Leicester
- Clarke Energy Ltd, Liverpool, Merseyside
- Contra Vision Ltd, Bramhall, Manchester
- Cooking Marvellous Ltd, Shrewsbury, Shropshire
- Cordex Instruments Ltd, Middlesbrough, North Yorks
- CreditCall Ltd, Bristol
- CSB Holdings Plc, Slough, Berkshire
- Cut4Cloth Ltd, Helston, Cornwall
- Cygnet Group Ltd, Northwich, Cheshire
- Dawnus Construction Ltd Swansea, West Glam
- Design Blue Ltd (t/a D3O), Portslade, East Sussex
- Dismatec Ltd, Sheffield, South Yorkshire
- The Dreyfuss Group Ltd, London
- Ekioh Ltd, Cambridge
- Electronic Temperature Instruments Ltd, Worthing, West Sussex
- Elekta Ltd, Crawley, West Sussex
- Elemental Microanalysis Ltd Okehampton, Devon
- EnergyNet Ltd, London
- Engineering Technology Applications Ltd Romsey, Hampshire
- Euromonitor International Plc, London
- EV Offshore Ltd Norwich, Norfolk
- Extronics Ltd, Middlewich, Cheshire
- EziDock Systems Ltd Kirkby-in-Ashfield, Nottinghamshire

=== F-M ===
- Fluid Transfer International Ltd, Nailsworth, Gloucestershire
- A Fulton Company Ltd, London
- Garrets International Ltd, Romford, Essex
- Global Infusion Group, Chesham, Bucks
- Gong Communications Ltd London
- Graff Diamonds International Ltd, London
- Green 4 Solutions Ltd, Lutterworth, Leicestershire
- Guidance Navigation Ltd Leicester
- Harvard Engineering Ltd Normanton, West Yorks
- HCA International Ltd, London
- HH Global Ltd, t/a HH Global Sutton, Surrey
- High Voltage Partial Discharge Ltd, Manchester
- Ikon Geopressure, Durham
- Industrial Washing Machines Ltd, Birmingham
- Inflight Peripherals Ltd, Newport, Isle of Wight
- Innovative Technology Ltd, Oldham, Lancashire
- Inoveight Ltd, Crook, County Durham
- Integrated Display Systems Ltd, Wallsend, Tyne & Wear
- ISG Plc London
- Ishida Europe Ltd, Birmingham
- Jaguar Land Rover Ltd, Coventry, West Midlands
- JDR Cable Systems Ltd, Ely, Cambridgeshire
- Johnson & Johnson Professional Export, Livingston, West Lothian, Scotland
- JSB Group Ltd, London
- Kiln Flame Systems Ltd, High Wycombe, Bucks
- Leverton Clarke Ltd Basingstoke, Hampshire
- Linguamatics Ltd, Cambridge
- Loch Fyne Oysters Ltd, Argyll and Bute, Scotland
- London Tradition Ltd, London
- Lumishore Ltd, Swansea, Wales
- Marco Ltd, Edenbridge, Kent
- Marketing VF Ltd, London NW5
- Maviga International (Holdings) Ltd Maidstone, Kent
- John McAslan + Partners London
- Mechatherm International Ltd, Kingswinford, West Midlands
- Melett Ltd, Barnsley, South Yorkshire
- Merlin ERD Ltd, Perth and Kinross, Scotland
- Thomas Miller Claims Management Ltd Newcastle upon Tyne

=== N-Z ===
- Nasco (UK) Ltd, Southall, Middlesex
- National Examination Board in Occupational Safety & Health, Leicester
- Online Electronics Ltd, Aberdeen, Scotland
- Optasense Ltd, Farnborough, Hampshire
- Orangebox Ltd, Caerphilly, Wales
- Oxford Immunotec Ltd, Abingdon, Oxfordshire
- Oxford Technologies Ltd Abingdon, Oxfordshire
- Paragon Inks (Holdings) Ltd, W.Lothian, Scotland
- ParkCloud Ltd, Stockport, Manchester
- PCL Ceramics Ltd, King's Lynn, Norfolk
- Peak Scientific Instruments Ltd Renfrew, Scotland
- Penta Consulting Ltd, Wallington, Surrey
- Pico Technology Ltd, St Neots, Cambridgeshire
- Plas Farm Ltd, Gaerwen, Anglesey, Wales
- Priestman Goode Ltd London
- Prima Dental Manufacturing Ltd, Gloucester
- PrimeVigilance Ltd, Guildford, Surrey
- Quorum Technologies Ltd Lewes, East Sussex
- Rhead Group Ltd, Coventry, West Midlands
- Seacon (Europe) Ltd Great Yarmouth, Norfolk
- SecurEnvoy Plc, Theale, Berkshire
- Severn Glocon Group Plc Gloucester
- Smart Voucher Ltd t/a Ukash London
- Smylie Ltd, Birkenhead, Merseyside
- Spencer Ogden Ltd, London
- STG Aerospace Ltd, Swaffham, Norfolk
- Sysco Guest Supply Europe Ltd, Reading, Berks
- Tangle Teezer Ltd, London
- John Tibbs Associates Ltd, Tunbridge Wells, Kent
- T.I.S.S. Ltd, Blackpool, Lancashire
- Tissue Solutions Ltd, Glasgow, Scotland
- Travel Counsellors Ltd, Bolton, Lancashire
- Turner & Townsend Plc, Leeds, West Yorkshire
- Vernalis Research, successor to research division of Vernalis plc
- Vero Software Ltd, Cheltenham, Gloucestershire
- Vita Liberata Ltd, County Antrim, Northern Ireland
- What More UK Ltd, Burnley, Lancashire
