= Paint protection film =

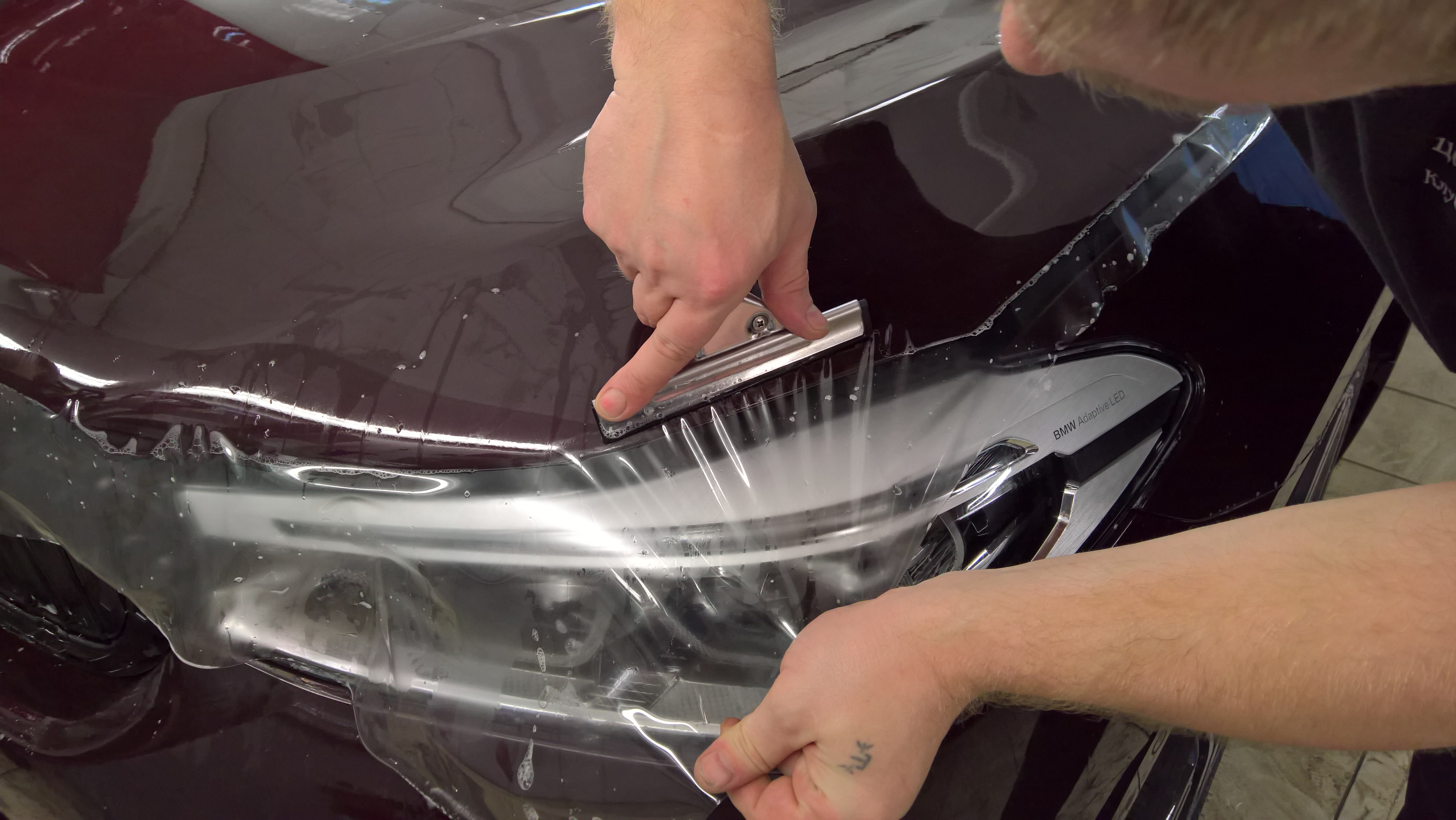
Paint protection film being applied

Paint protection film (PPF, also called clear bra, clear film or clear paint film) is a thermoplastic urethane and often self-healing film applied to painted surfaces of a new or used car in order to protect the paint from stone chips, bug splatters, and minor abrasions. This film is also used on airplanes, RVs, cell phones, electronics, screens, motorcycles, and many other areas. Paint protection film is OEM approved by virtually all car manufacturers.

Paint protection film is installed on a limited basis by manufacturers on various pieces of cars at the factory (e.g. the rear arches of Porsches). This film is most commonly applied to high-impact areas of vehicles which include: the hood, the front fenders, the front bumper, the side view mirrors, the rocker panels, the lower portion of the doors, and the rear guards behind the rear wheels. This is because these specific panels are the most susceptible to damage from rock chips and other forms of road debris from other vehicles, driving near construction, and even through self-inflicted damage—which is caused by simply driving due to the fact that debris is inevitably kicked up from the tires rotating. The film is generally installed by certified trained professionals who receive supplies from outside distributors and dealers.

== Military origins of paint protection film ==
As with many other consumer products, paint protection films were first developed and used by the military. During the Vietnam War, helicopter rotor blades and other sensitive parts of military transports were often damaged by flying shrapnel and debris. In order to help protect these moving parts, the US military asked 3M to come up with a solution that was both inconspicuous and low-weight.

The advantage of replaceable film over the replacement and repair of damaged rotor blades was immediately clear and its adoption was uncharacteristically quick for the US military. As a result, there are still people in the industry who refer to PPF as "helicopter tape" although this term is becoming less and less common as automotive applications have taken precedence.

== Adoption of PPF by automotive sector ==
The use of paint protection film by the military has continued to the present day and 3M now makes a wide variety of aerospace and military films. With time, however, the automobile industry began to take note of the protective benefits of PPF and it was soon being employed by race car drivers despite the difficulty of working with the original films. According to Kathy Lam, marketing manager for the automotive division of 3M “The first films were thicker and less compliant, [because] their purpose was to help keep helicopter blades from eroding in the harsh, sandy environments to which they were exposed. Because the blades were flatter and less complex than automotive surfaces, they didn't demand a highly flexible, conformable film.”

== Contemporary automotive paint protection films ==
Today's automotive PPF is highly conformable and optically clear and is available in a variety of thicknesses (measured in mil in the US) and colors. New products are multi layered and offer a self-healing top coat capable of reforming itself after being scuffed or scratched, maintaining clarity for more than ten years. Products from some vendors also offer hydrophobic properties, similar to those provided by a ceramic paint coating. Contemporary applications require a slip solution or gel as a barrier keeping the film from adhering to the painted panel. Custom and advanced applicators use steam, heat guns and torches to help apply film to complex surfaces. Pre-stretch and pre-form of films are also used for complex wraps and curves.

== Types of installation available ==
There are different styles of installation of PPF. Installation with a plotter can be done using software designed to create a pattern to the shape of the panel the film is being installed on. It is possible to modify a plotter software pattern to suit the needs of an installer and/or their customer. The most experienced installers can actually hand template panels, and then convert those templates into digital format for software to then cut them digitally, meaning that any custom work can be converted into a digital template. Installation without a plotter, by bulk installing film from the roll, is a risk, as the film is cut directly onto the surface of the vehicle.

In addition to installations performed in situ at the factory or by certified shops and dealerships, there are also a select number of vendors who sell pre-cut and vehicle specific paint protection kits, as well as individuals who sell these kits on online auction sites or other markets.

PPF is designed specifically for physical protection against light road debris and scratching on paintwork. It is different from sealants which are usually in liquid form and are designed for UV and chemical resistance. Sealants harden the clear coat of the paintwork, but are not designed to protect the vehicle from physical damage. For this reason, both PPF and sealants can be used on vehicles to protect the panels in different ways.

== See also ==
- Vehicle vinyl wrap
