= Mobile billboard =

Advertising device on a mobile vehicle

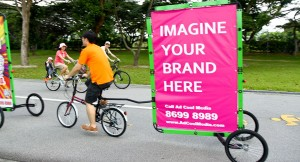
Bicycle advertising

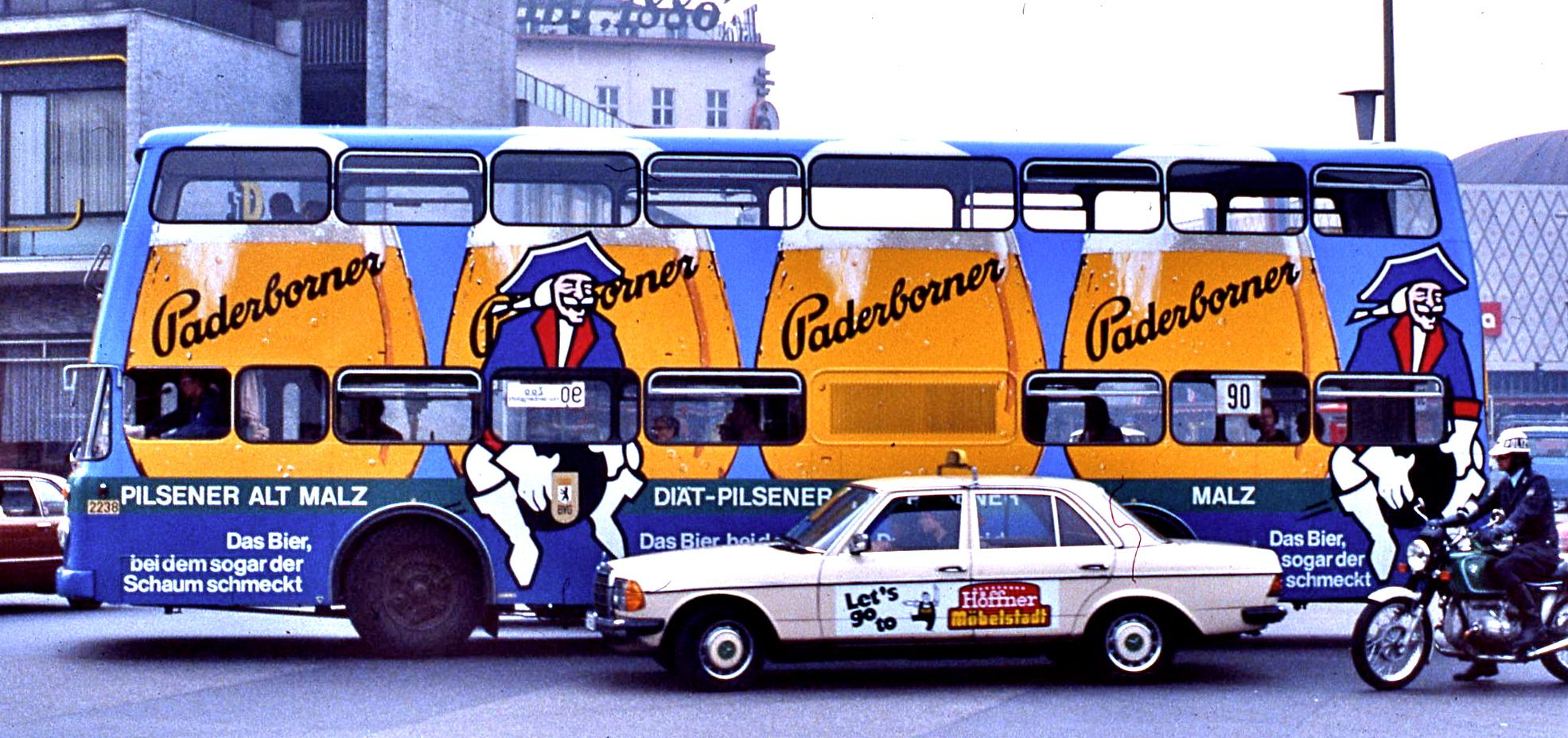
Bus and Taxi advertising

A mobile billboard is a device used for advertising on the sides of a truck, bus, trailer, bike, or other vehicle that is typically mobile. Mobile billboards are a form of transit media; static billboards and mall/airport advertising fall into this same category. Using a mobile billboard for advertising is called mobile outdoor advertising.

== Description ==
Most mobile billboards are dedicated, customized LED trucks with large bodies for displaying advertisements. Some of these dedicated units offer features such as external sound systems, illumination, LED panels and hot/cold boxes for product sampling, although they are illegal in many cities. Digital mobile billboard trucks have become popular, but the most capable in terms of gaining exposure are static mobile billboards. Static mobile billboards do not share advertising space.

Some of the most cost effective mobile billboards are installed wraps on trucks and trailers that are in service delivering goods serving as multi-purpose vehicles achieving "green status" or "truck side advertising".

Box-type trucks with panels enclosing the cargo space can be turned into a mobile 3D display case. Many companies use these trucks for parades, product launches, furniture displays, and general rapid-awareness creation. Almost anything can be placed inside of the boxes for display.

For micromarketing campaigns, small-engine scooters and human walking billboards are used for experiential marketing and direct to consumer marketing.

== Effectiveness ==
Industry analysts, researchers and trade representatives have researched the effectiveness of mobile billboards. 90% of US travelers have noticed outdoor mobile media billboards. 3M and the American Trucking Association noted 91% of the target noticed the text and graphics on truck advertising, and the Traffic Audit Bureau noted that on local routes monthly impressions ranged from one to four million hits. Product Acceptance and Research said 94% of respondents recalled seeing the Mobile Billboard, with 80% recalling the specific advertisement; the billboards resulted in a sales increase of 107%.

== Utilisation ==
Mobile billboards are generally used due to the perceived benefits such as being able to deliver a message in places where traditional billboards are unavailable. They also offer a medium that does not get cluttered by other advertisements and are not generally seen near competitors. Many also find it advantageous that the message is less likely to be tuned out by drivers than other advertising mediums.

== Legality ==
Some municipalities have strict laws against mobile advertisements. According to the London Hackney Carriage Act 1853 (16 & 17 Vict. c. 33) and section 9 of the Metropolitan Streets Act 1867 (30 & 31 Vict. c. 134) it is not lawful for any person to carry any picture, placard, notice, or advertisement, on any carriage or on horseback or on foot in London except those which are approved by the Commissioner of Police.

In Norway, the use of wrap advertising on buses was prohibited by the road authorities. The reason behind the ban was that in an emergency, the windows might need to serve as an emergency exit and that the advertising would make the window harder to break with the emergency hammer. Gaia Trafikk argued against the ban, pointing out that their tests showed that the thin wrap had no impact on the breakability of the window, but did remove the advertising which covered the windows.

== See also ==
- Bus advertising
- Fleet media
- Human billboard
- Out-of-home advertising
- Truckside advertisement
