= Euromonitor International =

Data analytics company

Euromonitor International Ltd is a London-based data analytics company founded in 1972.

The firm is well regarded, and its research database has been described as the "Cadillac of industry information sources", but subscriptions have been described as too expensive for some institutions.

== History ==
The firm was founded by Robert Senior in 1972. Trevor Fenwick joined in 1978.

Euromonitor International's main product is Passport, a subscription-based database of market research. Much of the information on Passport is written by Euromonitor International's analysts, although it also includes information from various other sources.

In 2014, the Queen's Award for Enterprise: International Trade (Export) was awarded to Euromonitor.

== See also ==
- GlobalData
- Mintel
- Statista
- NielsenIQ
- Datamonitor
