= Fleet media =

The term fleet media refers to the placement of advertisements on the side of trucks, vans, and other forms of transportation that form part of a commercial fleet. It entails more than the addition of a company logo, name and number to the vehicles belonging to that company. The crucial difference is that fleet media, like any other form of advertising, is commercially available. If it is possible to buy space on a retailer’s delivery fleet then this would be fleet media as a form of retail media. Equally if a delivery/logistics company were to sell advertising space on its delivery vans this would be fleet media.

As a media fleet can be viewed as at best semi-targeted, and at worst untargeted. The only claim that fleet media can make to targeting is that the location of the vehicle in question is potentially limited geographically. Fleet media are more likely to be seen by people with cars on freeways or motorways or in the neighbourhoods of the business premises that own the fleet. It is something of a stretch to consider this targeting even if a vehicle is limited to a singles state, or area of the country, but occasionally this kind of thing is quoted anecdotally as a targeting effect.

Fleet media are often used in the UK as part of the launch of cinema releases or DVD launches.

== See also ==
- Aerial advertising
- Bus advertising
- Driven media
- Helicopter banner
- Mobile billboard
- Out-of-home advertising
- Skywriting
- Transit media
- Truckside advertisement
- Van lettering
- Wrap advertising
