= Factory tint =

Type of automotive glass tint

Factory tint, officially known as privacy glass, is an electrical process called "deep dipping" that involves dying the inside of automotive glass with a dark pigment. Factory tint is standard on the rear half of many new vehicles. With a common visual light transmission (VLT) of 15–26%, privacy glass is installed to provide passengers and personal items privacy from outsiders, hence the name privacy glass. Since most states have a VLT legal limit of around 50% for the front driver windows and windshield, factory tint is only applied to the rear half of vehicles windows to avoid breaking the law.

== Benefits ==
With a low VLT, the primary benefit of privacy glass is to reduce the ability to see into the vehicle, providing privacy for passengers and personal items.

== Heat rejection ==
Although privacy glass has a tint to it, its heat-rejecting properties are limited. Some manufacturers claim their privacy glass can reject a large percentage of UVA and UVB, but the infrared light is still able to pass through, allowing passengers to still feel heat from the sun. Privacy glass does prevent some heat from entering the vehicle, although not nearly as effectively as a ceramic window film.

Some manufacturers, like Audi, Mercedes and Volvo Cars are now offering different types of glass in their vehicles to reduce heat from being transmitted into the cabin.

== Removal ==
Unlike window film, privacy glass is a pigment within the glass that is installed during the manufacturing process. There is no way to remove the tint from the glass except to replace the glass with untinted glass. The only alternative to getting the same benefits of window film is to install window film over the factory tint. There are clear window films for automotive use that will not further darken the factory tint. Many consumers attempt to match the privacy glass to their front windows and windshield when it is legal to do so in their local jurisdiction.

== See also ==
- Window film
