= Contra Vision =

Company located in Georgia, USA

Contra Vision Ltd sells a range of perforated window films to printers for them to produce see-through graphics. Contra Vision also offers other see-through graphics products including non-perforated window films and printed interlayers for laminated glass.

Contra Vision was founded in 1985. There are two wholly owned subsidiaries: Contra Vision North America, Inc., which operates out of Atlanta, Georgia, US, covering the North American market and surrounding countries; and Contra Vision Supplies Ltd, which operates across the other continents of the world from a base in Stockport, UK.

The company was awarded a Queen’s Award for Enterprise: Innovation in 2015. This followed a Queen’s Award for Enterprise: International Trade in 2014.
