= Truckside advertisement =

Type of portable billboard

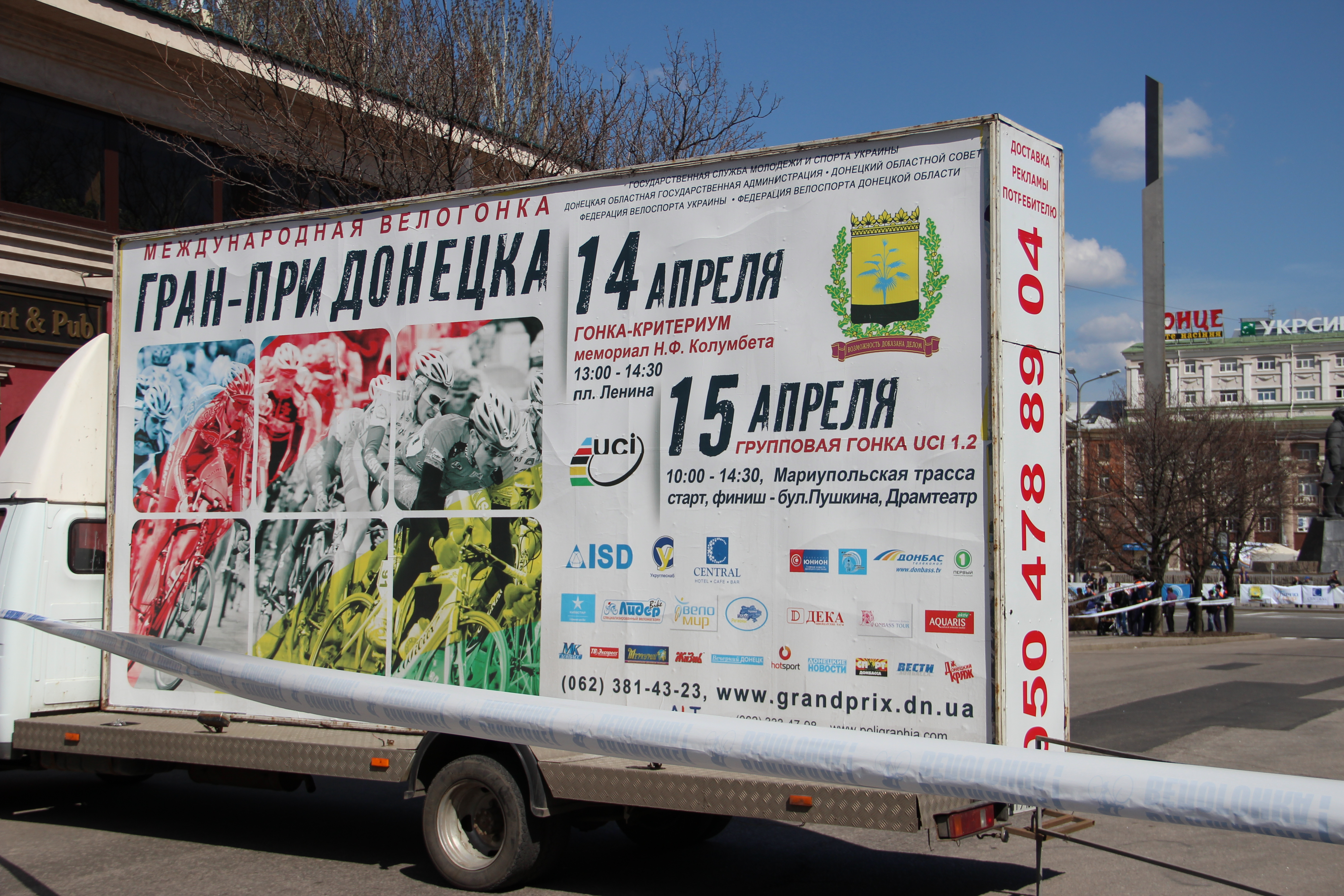

A truckside advertisement or truckside ad is a billboard that is affixed to a truck that is for the purpose of advertising to the general public. This is a form of outdoor advertising classified as transit advertising by the outdoor advertising association of America.

Truckside advertisements have been argued by many to have one of the lowest CPM (Cost Per Thousand) impressions available to advertisers in the market. with a cost coming in at 81 cents per thousand compared to 10.40 for a 30-second TV commercial on a prime-time network, 11.03 for a quarter page newspaper ad, and 9.14 for a four-color magazine ad.

== See also ==
- Bus advertising
- Driven media
- Fleet media
- Mobile billboard
- Out-of-home advertising
- Wrap advertising
