= Mirror TV =

Television that can change into a mirror

A mirror TV or TV mirror is a television that can change into a mirror. Mirror TVs are often used to save space or hide electronics in bathrooms, bedrooms and living rooms. Mirror TVs can be integrated into interior designs, including in smart homes, hotels, offices, gyms, and spas.

Mirror TVs are widely used in luxury hotels, retail stores, and fitness centers, where they serve dual purposes of aesthetic design and entertainment. Some high-end models integrate voice control, smart lighting systems, and home automation features.

A mirror TV consists of a semi-transparent dielectric mirror with an LCD or OLED screen behind it. The mirror allows an image to pass through when the TV is on while maintaining reflectivity when the TV is off.

Placement of a mirror TV is important to ensure both good mirror reflection and television picture quality. A space with high levels of lighting is optimal for reflection when the TV looks like a mirror, while low levels of light are ideal for TV viewing. Experts recommend using block out blinds in bright rooms, such as those with large windows and skylights, when watching television on a mirror TV during the day to reduce the amount of reflection when the TV is on. TV viewing is not affected by reflection on the mirror TV in the evenings.

Some mirror TVs are designed for bathroom use, featuring waterproof enclosures and anti-fog technology. Others are built for outdoor installations, with weather-resistant casing and high-brightness displays to combat glare.

Some manufacturers offer high-end input and output options for entire-home A/V integration. Many manufacturers, particularly those producing for residential use, have updated their mirror TVs to be compatible with smart TV operating systems such as Apple TV and Android TV.
