= Bus advertising =

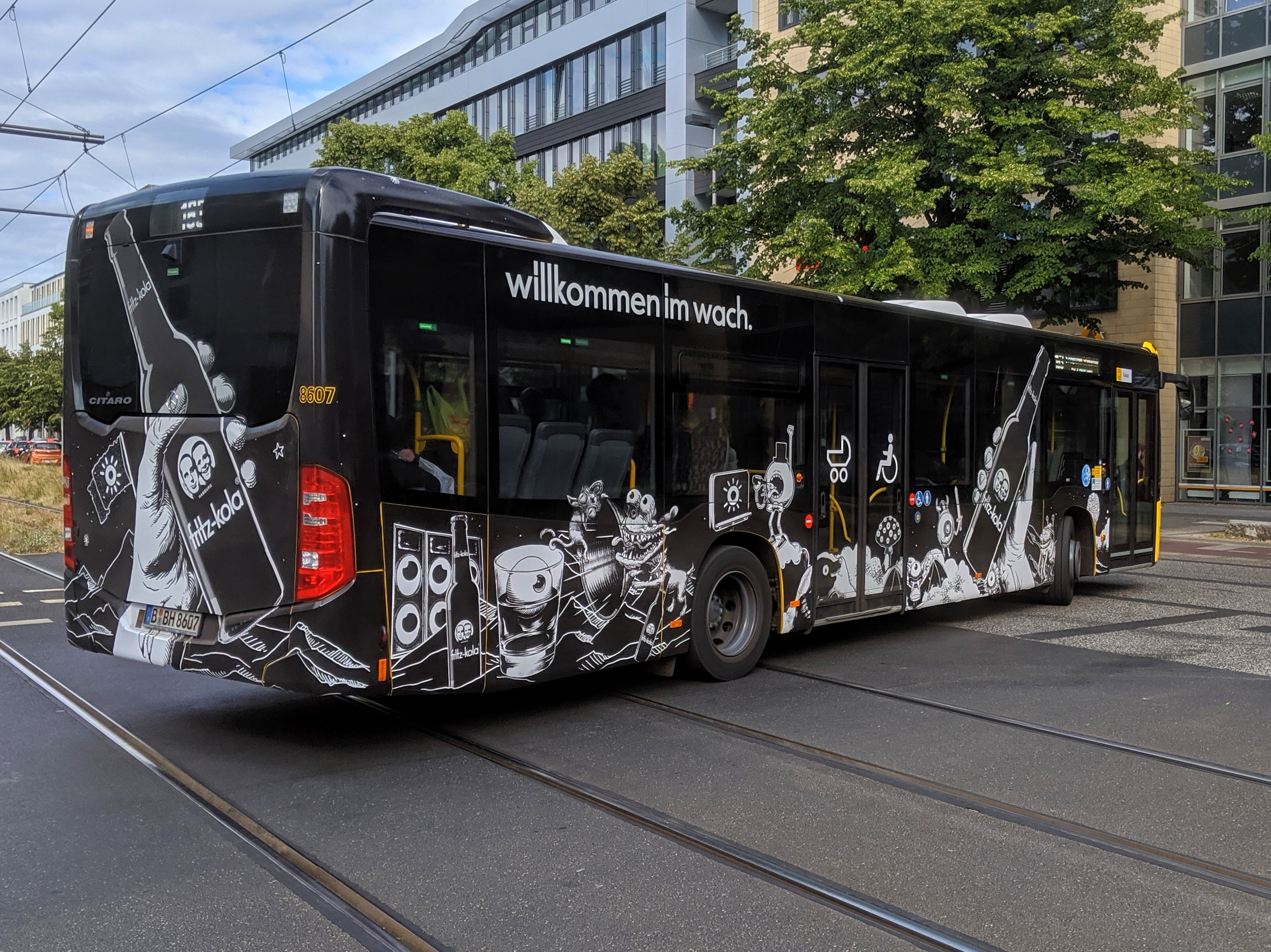
A Fritz-kola advertisement on a BVG bus in Berlin, Germany

In bus advertising, buses and their related infrastructure are a medium used by advertisers to reach the public with their message. Usually, this takes the form of promoting commercial brands, but it can also be used for public campaign messages. Buses may also be used as part of a political or promotional campaign, or as a tool in a commercial enterprise.

== History ==
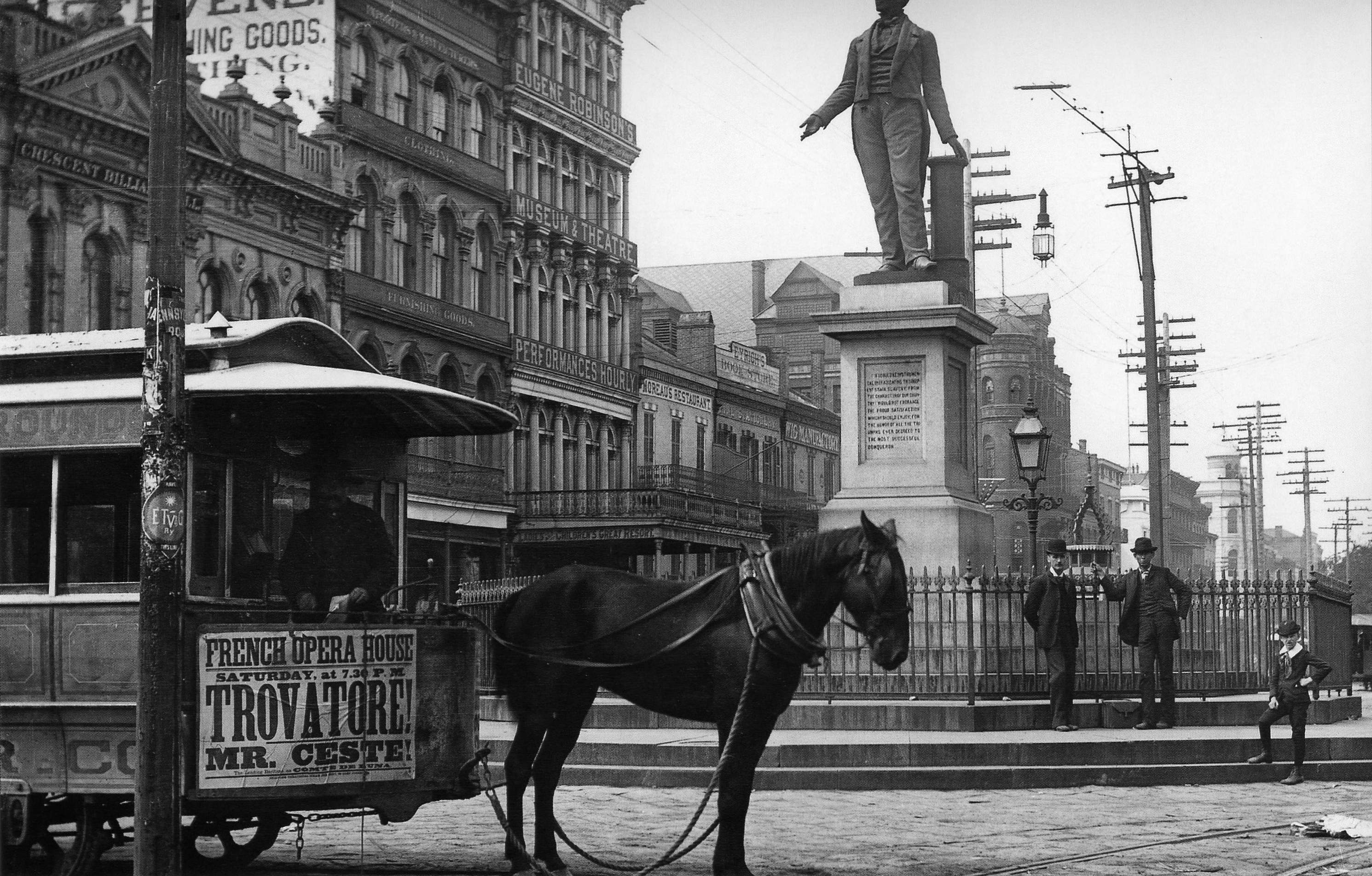
A mule-drawn streetcar at Lafayette Square along St. Charles Avenue in New Orleans in the early 1890s. The front apron of the streetcar displays an advertisement for a performance of Trovatore! at the French Opera House.

Bus advertising descends from similar methods used on streetcars in the early 20th century.

== Infrastructure ==
Adverts are placed in bus shelters. These can be static posters, or back illuminated displays, or rolling displays allowing many messages on one shelter. Technology has also been used to create interactive adverts.

Adverts may also be installed on associated street furniture such as the backs of benches at stops. Sized at approximately 2.5 by 6.5 feet, bus bench ads tend to be cheaper per unit than other forms of outdoor mass advertising.

== Tickets ==
Often, the paper bus ticket is used as an advertising space. The ticket rolls for the ticket machines are pre-printed on the rear with a particular company's advert.

== Bus interiors ==
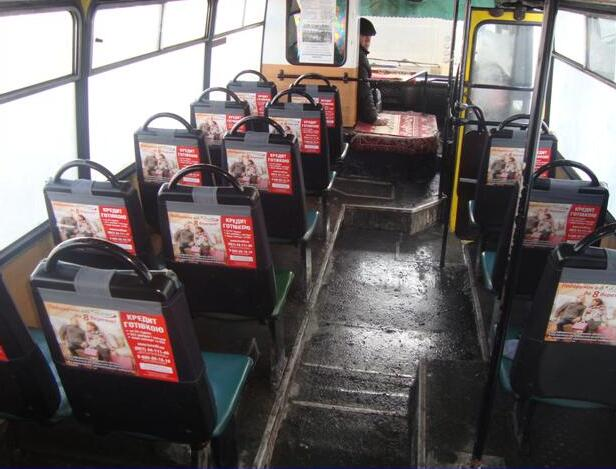
Bus interior with advertising on seat backs

A common location for adverts is inside the bus. Adverts are attached to the corners between the walls and ceiling overhead to catch the eye of passengers, in the same manner as used in rapid transit systems.

Increasingly, companies are using interior television systems to advertise. The most common technology is the LCD-TFT systems in different resolutions: 18.5" (also side-by-side panels 18.5" + 18.5"), 21.5" and stretched monitors in 29.4".

The LCD-TFT were originally installed to show route information to passengers (next-stop, path, maps, intersection with other routes etc.), then additional public information (messages from bus company, the Public Administration, etc.) and entertainment, which is known with the neologism infotainment. It common to use this space for both public information and advertising, providing both a public service but also a regular income for the different players involved in the public transport.

== Bus exteriors ==
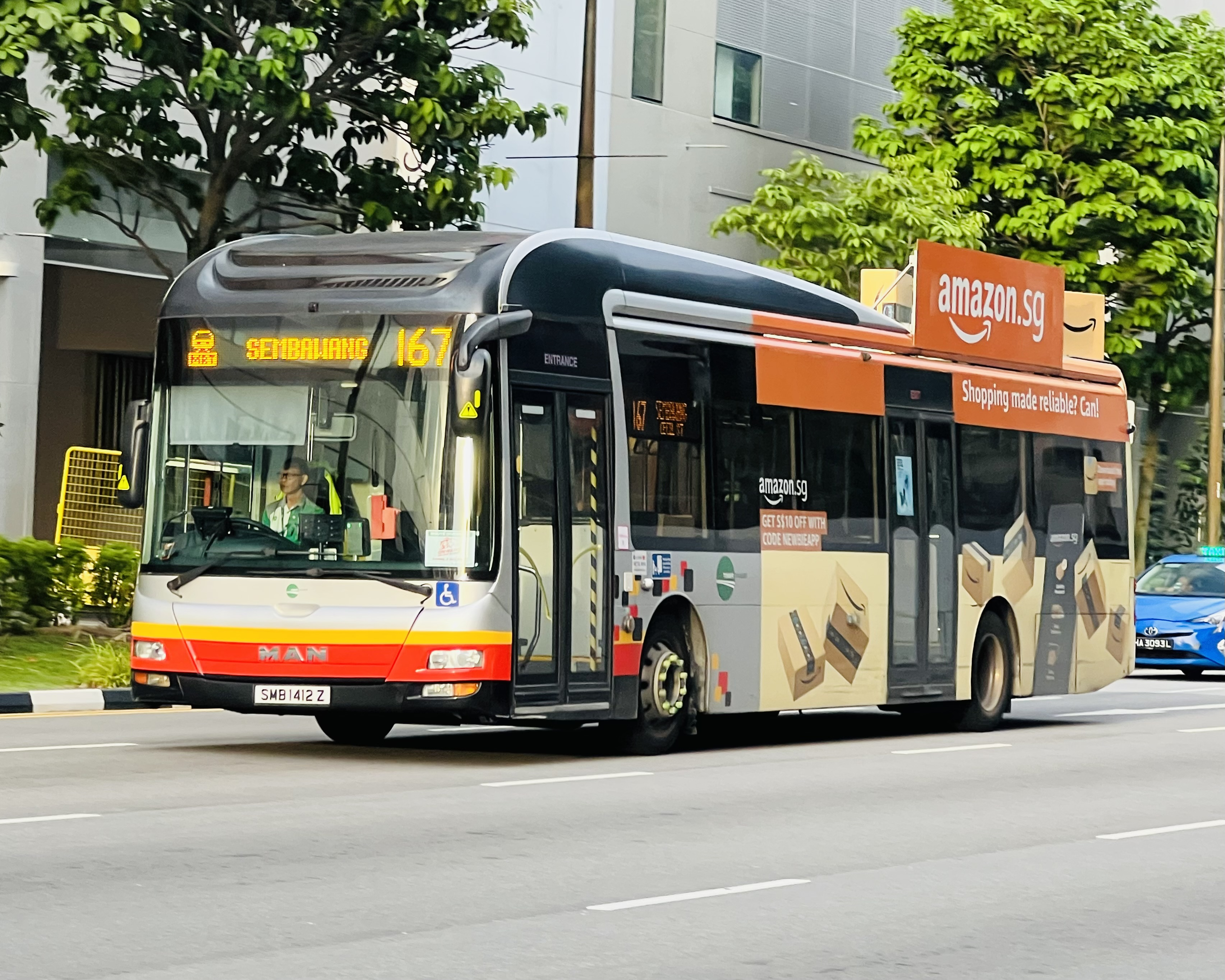
A bus in Singapore with an advertisement for Amazon, with 2D billboards and 3D boxes on the roof of the bus.

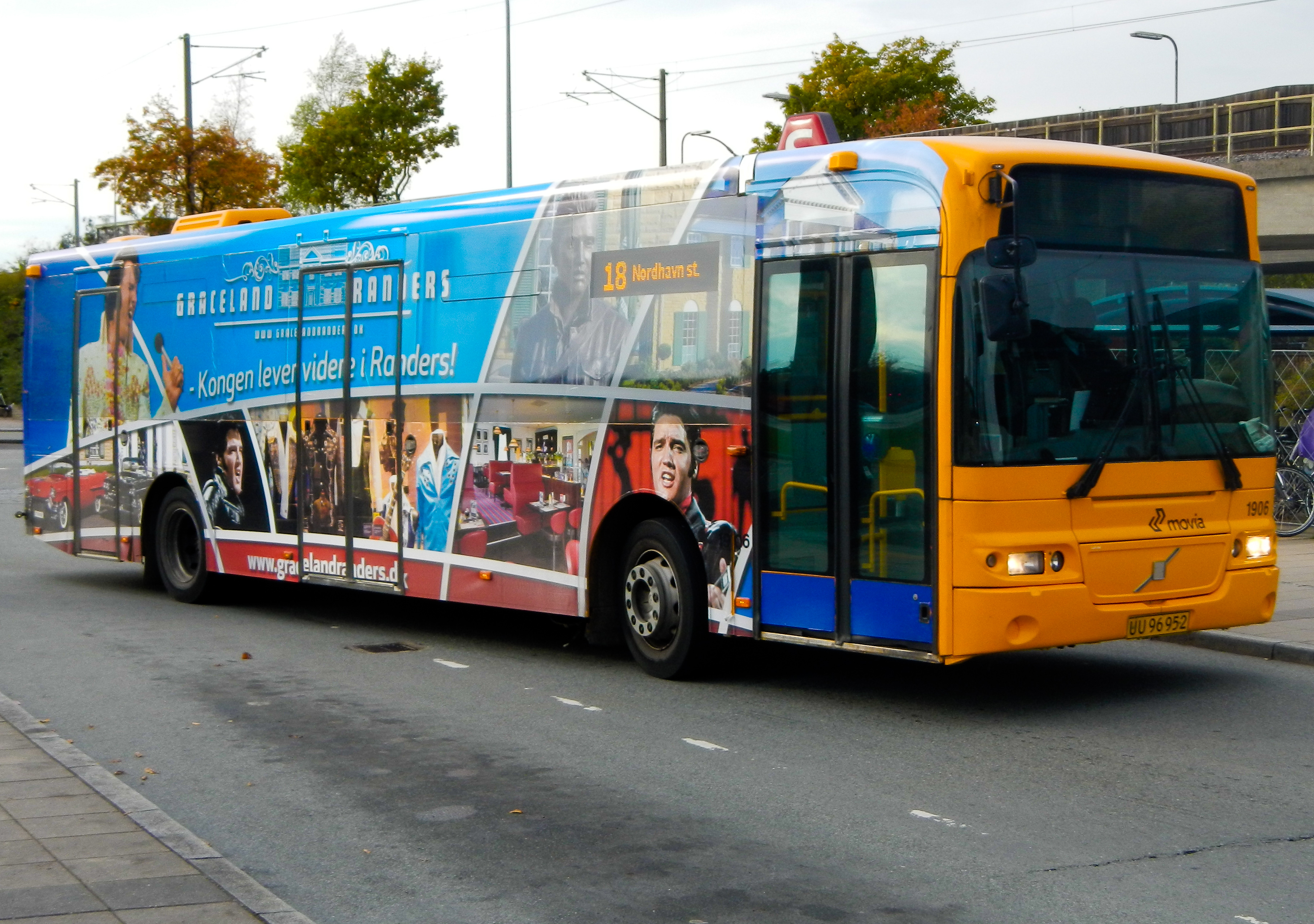
Wrap advertising on a bus in Denmark.

=== Panels ===
Adverts are often placed as basic rectangular motifs on the side or front of a bus. These may be applied directly to the bus. Additionally, adverts may be printed on placards known as boards, which are slotted into special guide fittings attached to the side of the bus.

=== Partial and full adverts ===
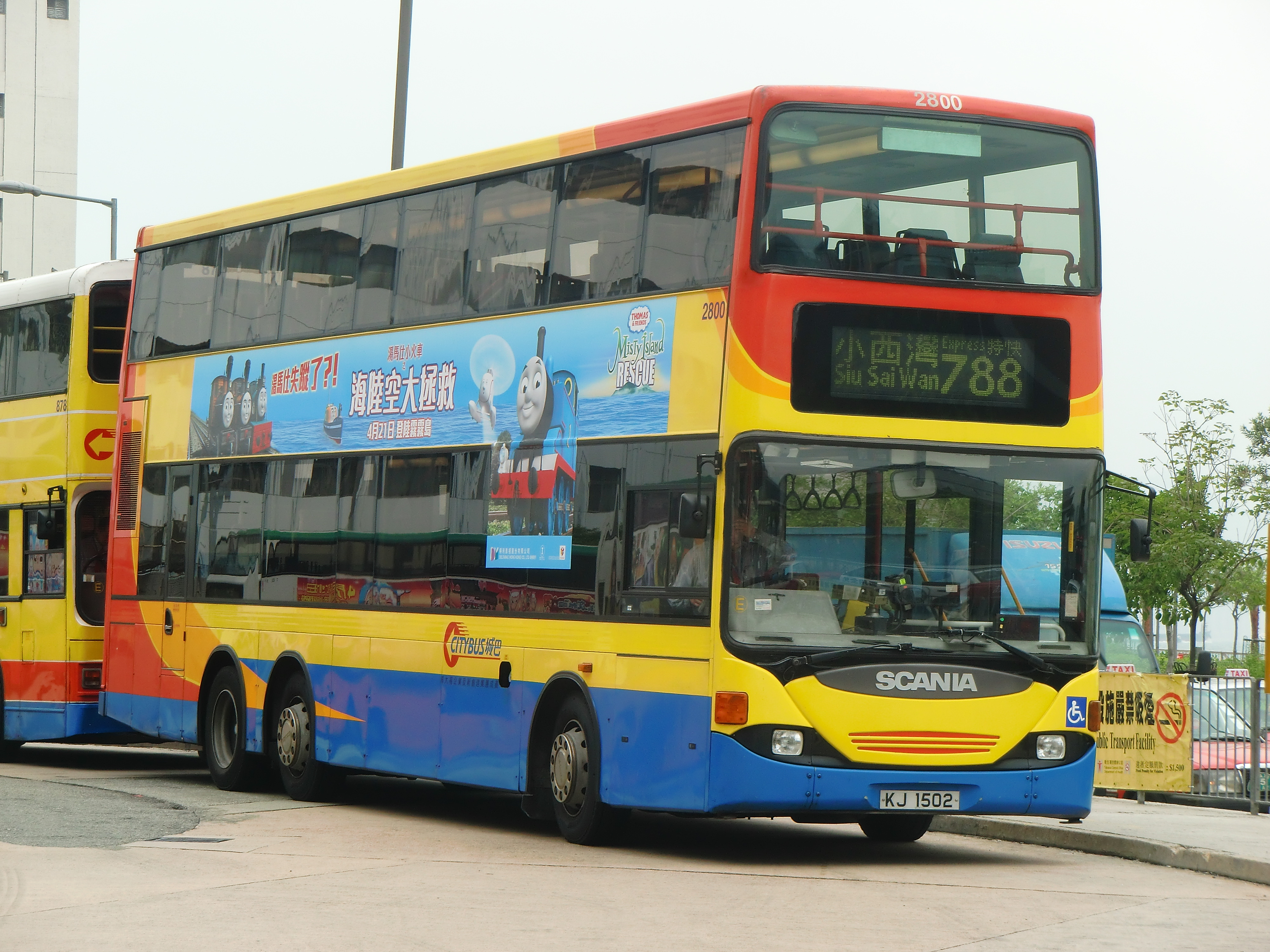
A bus in Hong Kong with T-side advertising.

Occasionally, the entire surface of a bus is turned into an advertisement. This can be a whole side or rear of a bus, or a scheme applied to the entire exterior, known as an 'all-over advert' bus.

A variety of formats are available to marketeers, although the most commonly used media formats are:

- T-sides
- Supersides
- Streetliners
- Rears and Mega Rears (Bus backs)
- Full Wraps

There are different options available to these formats in London because of the city's iconic double-decker buses.

Advertisers looking to promote a message can also make use of these formats which include:

- London Gold Frame
- Route Master

Depending on the size of the bus and its location, further creative can consist of:

- Coving Panels and Bulk Heads
- Super Squares
- Upper Bus Rears

== Technologies ==
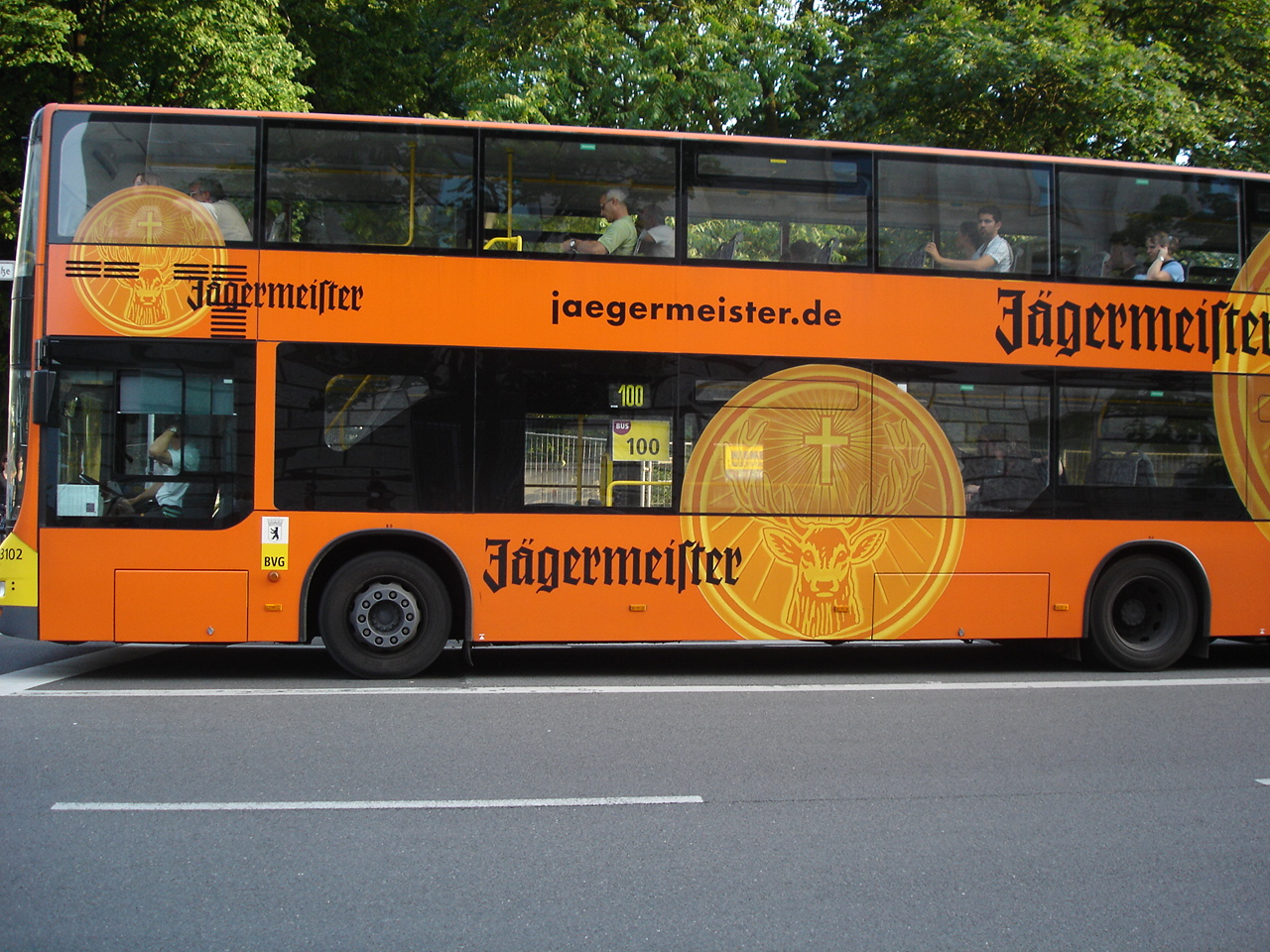
Vinyl decals allowing use of windows, on a side and rear advert for alcohol on a Berlin bus

Some panel and full side and all-over adverts were traditionally painted on if the length of application warranted it. This would require a reasonable longevity and cost implication for advertisers, due to the requirement to take buses out of service to apply and remove paint schemes. Frequently changed panel adverts would use replaceable boards.

With the advent of adhesive vinyl technologies, this allowed adverts to be rapidly applied and removed over the top of the buses exterior paint as decals, reducing the cost and time.

The invention of see-through graphics, most commonly applied as a self-adhesive perforated window film, allowed the creation of more elaborate designs that could be applied over windows (although for safety reasons not the front window), moving away from the traditional square box design approach to adverts.

With the advent of partially transparent window coverage techniques, all over adverts have been applied as a full vehicle advertising wrap windows and all. The transition from screen printing to digital printing has seen an increase in the color range and complexity of advert designs.

For short-term applications such as conference shuttles and charter bus rentals, temporary attachment methods have been developed that allow graphics to be applied and removed without altering the vehicle's original surface.

The latest bus advertising campaign by Adidas for the Brazil World Cup 2014 made use of full wrap and window coverage techniques. Transport for London launched the new formats as part of its ‘year of the bus’ celebrations, which commemorates the 60th anniversary of the Routemaster bus and the 100th anniversary of the first mass-produced motorbus.

== Campaign and promotion buses ==
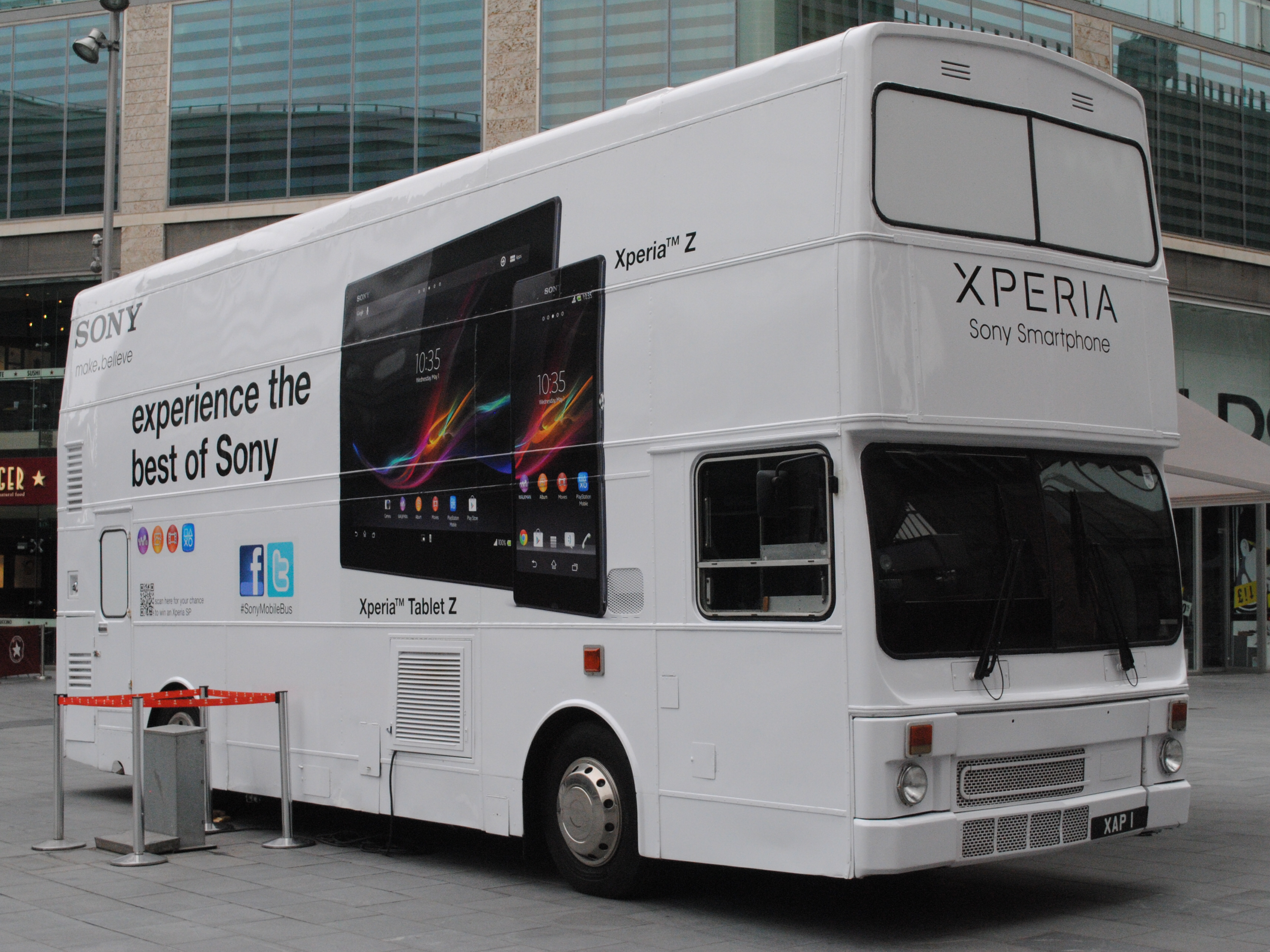
A campaign bus

In addition to public transport buses, all-over advert buses are often privately hired specifically for a special promotional use, such as a political campaign or specific product promotions. These will often make use of open top buses to allow the interaction of the campaigners/promoters with the public.

== Legal issues ==
In Norway, the use of wrap advertising on buses was prohibited by the road authorities. The reason behind the ban was that in an emergency the windows might need to serve as an emergency exit, and that the advertising would make the window harder to break with the emergency hammer. Gaia Trafikk argued against the ban, pointing out that their tests showed that the thin wrap had no impact on the breakability of the window, but did remove the advertising which covered the windows.

== See also ==
- Driven media
- Fleet media
- Mobile billboard
- Out-of-home advertising
- School bus advertising
- Truckside advertisement
- Wrap advertising
