= Vehicle vinyl wrap =

Vinyl covering for vehicles

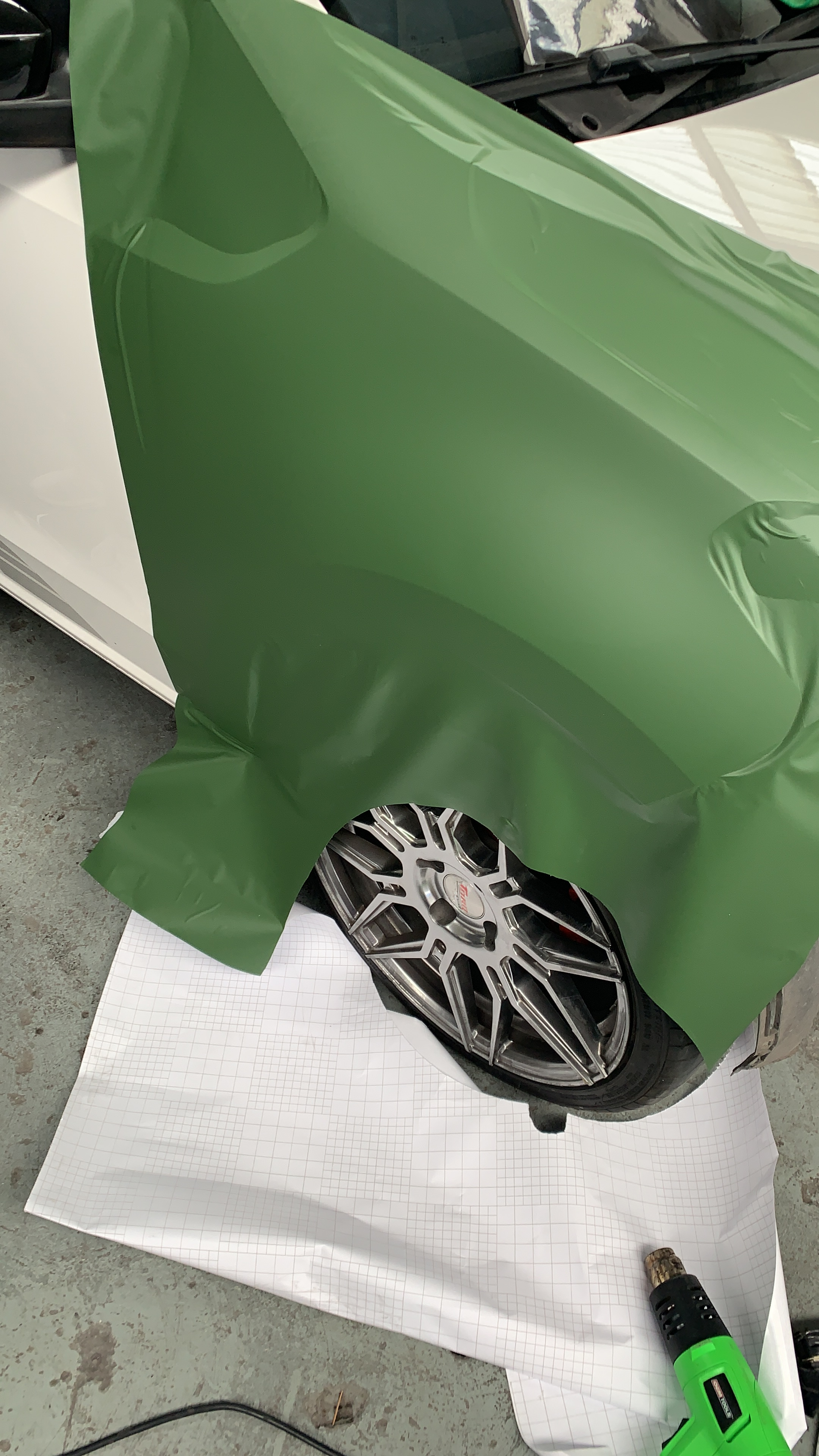
Wrapping process

A vehicle vinyl wrap is the automotive aftermarket practice of completely or partially covering a vehicle's original paint with a vinyl wrap. Generally this vinyl wrap will be a different color or finish like a gloss, matte, chrome or clear protective layer.

The purpose may be for a color change, advertising or custom livery.

Vinyl wraps were first used for advertising, resulting in vehicles becoming essentially mobile billboards. The vinyl sheets can later be removed with relative ease, drastically reducing the costs associated with changing advertisements.

== History ==
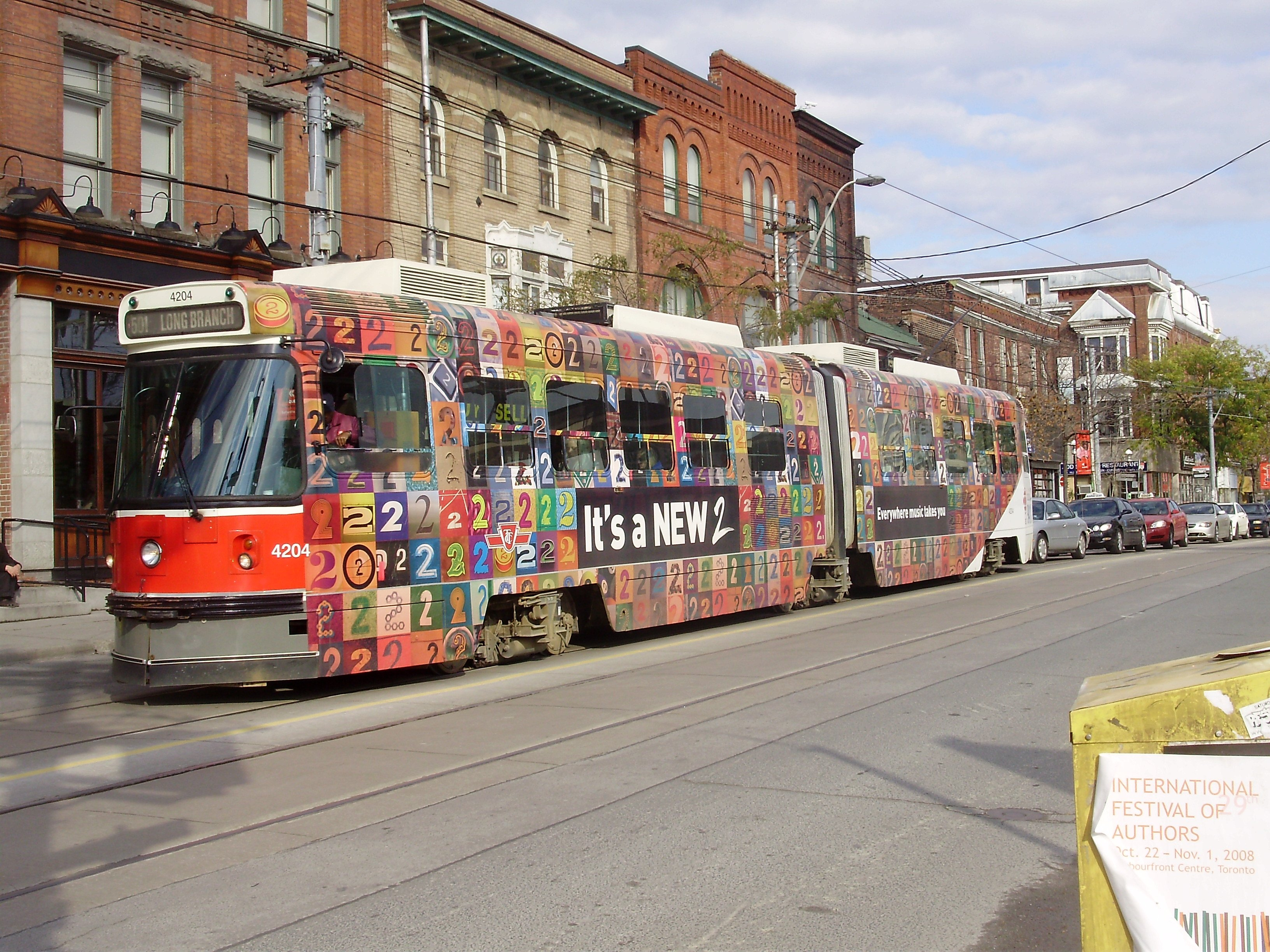
A streetcar in Toronto wearing a temporary wrap, advertising CBC Radio 2

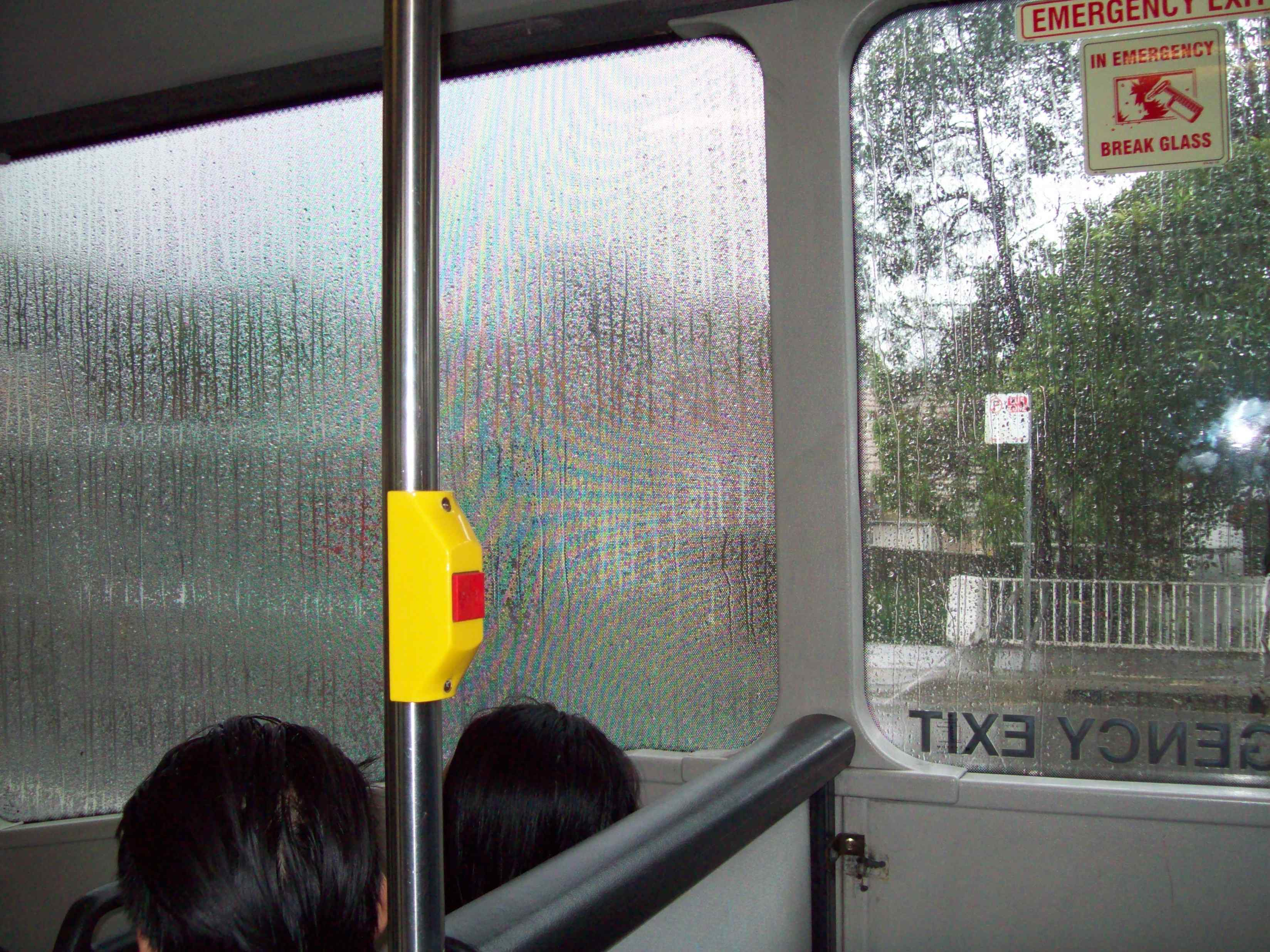
Shows how wet bus wrap distorts the view from inside through wrapped bus windows. The window on the left has a wrap advertisement on the outside whereas the window on the right does not

Vehicle vinyl wrap and color change wrap grew in popularity out of the wrap advertising business. The first attempts at using the plastic in commercial applications failed as a result of being too fragile. In 1926, Waldo Semon invented the vinyl still used today by introducing additives to PVC that made it flexible and easier to process.

One of the earliest cosmetic vinyl treatments dates to the 1950s and an aftermarket product by Newhouse Automotive Industries of Los Angeles, California. Costs for do-it-yourself (DIY) partial decorative (plaid or polka dot) vinyl treatments ranged from $10–20. The Newhouse Automotive ads described vinyl as the "very latest automotive sensation:" vehicle wraps. These ads began in 1954.

The world's first total bus wrap was produced in 1991 by Contra Vision in New Zealand for the Pan Pacific Hotel. The bus was converted into a mobile billboard which still allowed passengers inside to see out. The glass was covered with see-through graphics (one-way vision window graphics) using a clear PET window film which was part screen printed and part spray painted. The bodywork was directly spray painted.

A large milestone in the shift from small production vinyl lettering to a full vehicle vinyl color change took place in Germany in 1993 when the vinyl manufacturer CSK wraps was asked to produce a film to be used in place of paint for the purpose of converting cars into taxis. At this time, German taxi companies were required by law to paint their fleets in a government-mandated color, beige. CSK wraps provided an alternative to painting, which allowed taxi companies to bring a large fleet of vehicles into compliance with German law while maintaining the future resale value of the vehicle. Prior to this point, decommissioned taxis were heavily discounted or had to be completely repainted. With the use of vinyl vehicle wraps, there was no need to repaint them or discount them as the vinyl could be removed without damaging the paint underneath. CSK documented after 3 years of taxi service was complete, the vinyl was removed leaving a "pristine and unscratched paint surface".

The world's first digitally printed vehicle wrap is thought to have been created for Pepsi Co in 1993, which used vinyl to wrap a bus promoting its Crystal Pepsi product. It wasn't long before bus wrap advertising was everywhere and the new form of vehicle graphics trickled down to smaller businesses and consumers. Wrapping whole vehicles was still challenging. A majority of the difficulties came from premature adhesion and air bubbles under the vinyl. As technology improved, companies like Avery Dennison, 3M and Oracal developed the use of air-channels that made the vinyl repositionable and allowed for bubble-free installation. Air-channels, created using microscopic glass beads incorporated into the vinyl's adhesive, prevented the vinyl from fully sticking to the substrates surface thereby permitting air flow between adjacent sections. In addition, these beads allow for the vinyl to be repeatedly removed and reapplied until the beads are broken by firmly pressing the vinyl using a small hard squeegee. Once the beads are broken the vinyl will be firmly adhered to the substrates surface. Proprietary company blends of polymer in the vinyl allowed the material to conform to compound curves, recesses, and corrugations through the use of heat guns and torches.

By 2017, color change vinyl wraps, paint color matching vinyl wraps, and overlaminates evolved to include complex and creative graphic designs and advanced colors. Metallic, chrome, color shifting and even vinyl wraps that match OEM paint code colors are available. Color change and paint wrap is a term used by wrap installers and refers to a full-color change, as if one were 'painting' a car with a vinyl wrap. Demand for color matching vinyl wrap has grown. The wrap is manufactured to match vehicle paint colors and metallics, as well as in colors used in print such as Pantone colors. Most color change wraps are done to the exterior of a vehicle. Wrap installers can also wrap the door jambs (inner parts of the doors that can be seen when the doors are not closed) and other parts. These parts add additional cost to a wrap installation.

== Process ==
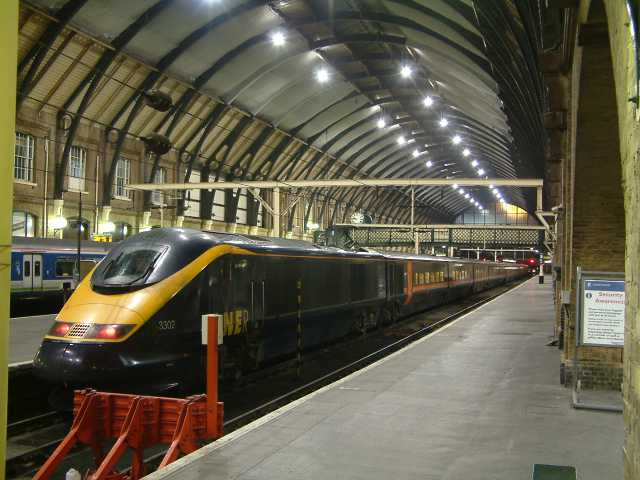
This train bears GNER's standard livery rather than an advertisement, but as it was on lease from Eurostar, the livery was applied using vinyl

Advancements in plastics have led to new types of vinyl designed specifically for wrap advertising, including vinyl sheets that feature bubble-preventing air channels. Microscopic glass beads are used to prevent an adhesive from functioning until the user is ready (the beads allow the material to be repeatedly lifted and reapplied during the wrapping process, without compromising the longevity of the wrap). The vinyl is heated with a heat gun or torch for the purpose of molding the material around objects.

Decals can be made to cover side and rear windows on a vehicle, but for safety reasons, the front windows used by the driver are not covered. The decals on side windows are typically perforated, so that it is still possible for passengers to look outside. This See-through graphic technology originated in the 1980s, with the first dominant patent registered by a British company called Contra Vision.

== Types ==
There are three main types of vinyl wrap for automotive vehicles:

- Cut graphics: these are individual graphics applied to the vehicle, i.e. logos, services or contact details.
- Half wraps: This can be a design that incorporates a larger graphic that can create more impact for example a large color image. It covers half the vehicle which includes the back doors.
- Full wraps: a full wrap covers the complete vehicle and can be any design.

== Manufacture ==
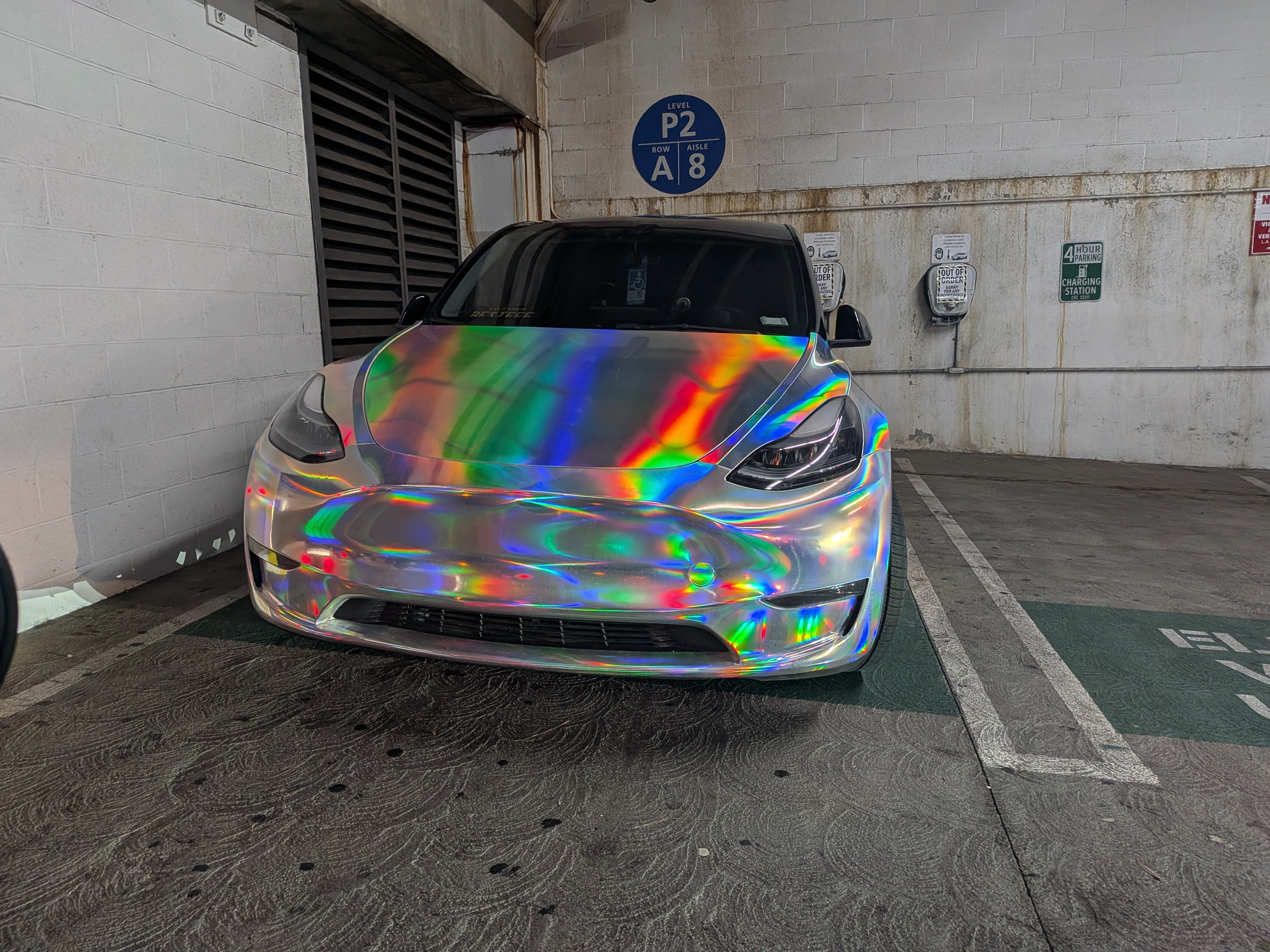
Tesla Model 3 with a custom holographic Iridescent Chrome vinyl wrap

Cast vinyl is the most common material used in color change wraps. Cast vinyl starts as a liquid and is cast into a sheet or form and then processed through ovens, evaporating solvents in the liquid. When the solvents evaporate, the remainder forms a solid film. Its thickness lies in the order of mils (thousandths of an inch) or μm (micrometers), and usually varies between 2 mils (51 μm) for printable media to 4 mils (100 μm) for solid color. Cast films conform well to curved shapes and strongly retain their original shape. This durability of shape allows for predictability on application and in applying heat to relax the material back to its natural form after modest stretching. Cast vinyl is less prone to shrinkage because stress (such as extrusion as in calendared films) is not applied to the material during the manufacturing process.

=== Cast vinyl ===
The term "cast" refers to the manufacturing process of this type of vinyl. Cast films are considered the industry premium. These films start in a liquid state with the ingredients blended together and then poured onto a casting sheet. The casting process produces a thin gauge film—usually 1- to 2-mil thick. By casting film on a sheet, the film stays in a more relaxed state, resulting in a durable, flexible, conformable and dimensionally stable film that retains color well. These films are ideal for complex surfaces such as vehicles and where a smooth finished look is expected.

=== Calendered vinyl ===
Calendered vinyl film or sheeting is manufactured by mixing powdered PVC, liquid softener and coloring agent into a molten dough-like mixture. The mixture is then extruded through a die and pressed into an increasingly thin sheet using a series of hard pressure rollers, called calendering rolls. When the material reaches the rollers, it passes through a series of decreasing gaps, which in turn increases the temperature and uniformity of the mixture. After each pass, the film becomes thinner and wider until the material is formed into a thin sheet of vinyl. The vinyl is then cooled, wound, and later coated with adhesive.

== Legislation ==
A number of municipalities have introduced strict laws in order to mandate against mobile advertisements; this has partially been due to the fact that wrap advertisements are purposefully circulated throughout high-density areas. New York City is a notable example, where any sort of motorized advertisement is outlawed. California also has strict rules . Mobile billboards have been identified as a contributing factor in the city's already-problematic traffic congestion.

== Other kinds of vinyl wrap ==
Color change wraps are similar in that a vinyl (although a cast vinyl sheet) is used to cover parts or whole vehicles in a new color or in a protective form of a color matching vinyl that may match an OEM paint color or may be a brand new color entirely. Many consumers are able to change the color of their vehicle to something that may not be available or even possible with paint. This may require disclosure to both the vehicle insurer and local vehicle authority, such as the DVLA in the UK, or the Department of motor vehicles (or equivalent) in each state of the USA.

Paint protection films (PPF) are clear and OEM paint color match vinyl films designed to protect paint. Clear PPF allows the original paint color to show through the protective vinyl and color matching vinyl films replicate the OEM color with a protective vinyl.

Vinyl wrap advertising has appeared on buildings around San Diego Comic-Con for years. Even though they are illegal, the Gaslamp Quarter Association has been paying the fines due to the lucrative income associated with the convention.

== See also ==
- Bus advertising
- Driven media – Advertising device on a mobile vehicle
- Fleet media
- Itasha – Vehicle decorated with images of fictional characters
- Mobile billboard – Advertising device on a mobile vehicle
- Out-of-home advertising
- Truckside advertisement – Type of portable billboard
- Decal – Pattern or image that can be moved to another surface upon contact
