= Engage! =

Engage!: The Complete Guide for Brands and Businesses to Build, Cultivate, and Measure Success in the New Web
- Author: Brian Solis
- Language: English
- Subject: Business, social media, marketing
- Genre: Non-fiction
- Publisher: John Wiley & Sons
- Publication date: March 8, 2010
- Publication place: United States
- Pages: 400
- ISBN: 978-1-118-00376-3
- Preceded by: Putting the Public Back in Public Relations: How Social Media Is Reinventing the Aging Business of PR
- Followed by: The End of Business as Usual: Rewire the Way You Work to Succeed in the Consumer Revolution

Engage!: The Complete Guide for Brands and Businesses to Build, Cultivate, and Measure Success in the New Web is a book by digital analyst Brian Solis. In Engage!, Solis provides an in-depth analysis of social media as a tool used in businesses. He focuses on how to leverage it to be successful in the world of business. In other words, Solis brings forth the tips that people can use to best market their products or services. Actor Ashton Kutcher wrote the foreword.

== Synopsis ==
The first half of Engage! introduces social media entities such as Facebook, YouTube, and Twitter, with chapters labeled "The New Media University: Social Media" 101, 201, 202, etc., all the way until "MBA Program—Second Year." Solis uses this university metaphor to help anyone at any place in their career start where they need to and go back and study the basics as necessary.

The second half of Engage! explores how to start social media programs, how to sell the program once started, and how to measure return on investment (ROI). Solis also explores the murky separation of personal and professional interactions in social media. He argues that social media channels are being used to broadcast in a one-to-many format not unlike traditional format before it. He believes that the formula for social media is instead one-to-one-to many, which will yield many to many.

Worksheets to assist planning and brand management are included.

In all, Engage! is separated into six parts:

- Part I: The New Reality of Marketing and Customer Service
- Part II: Forever Students of New Media
- Part III: Brand Representative Versus The Brand of You
- Part IV: We Are the Champions
- Part V: The Social Architect: Developing a Blueprint for New Marketing
- Part VI: A Little Less Conversation, A Little More Action: Rising Above the Noise

== Reception ==
Reference & Research Book News said the book has "a clear and persuasive style" in educating the reader on how to leverage social media for business and marketing purposes. In a positive review, P.G. Kishel of Choice wrote, "The book is well organized and does a good job of describing who the players are in the new media universe." Harvard Journal of Hispanic Policy reviewer Bessie King found the book to be "an elaborate and rich text that will build your character when taking the plunge to implement or defend a social media campaign".

Journal of Advertising Research's Lynne D. Johnson thought the book had "clear, concise language" and liked the numerous "marketing secrets" the book shares, concluding, "If I were teaching social media to a group of MBA students, Engage! would definitely be my text of choice." In a mixed review, Stephanie O'Donohoe of the International Journal of Advertising liked Solis's "rich and detailed handbook". She criticized the book having areas that would "jar" readers such as "several uninformative section and chapter headings, a few indigestible chunks of management-speak, and some exhortations that may alienate rather than inspire".

Engage! was a Top 10 Business Bestseller at Business Standard and an 800CEORead Business Book Bestseller at Inc.
