= Television advertising workflow =

TV advertising delivery describes the process of getting an ad to air on television. The workflow usually involves the advertisers, creative agencies, post-production houses, media agencies, advertising delivery specialists & broadcasters.

With global advertising spend more than doubling its growth rate from 2.6% to 5.7% from 2013 to 2014, and with a study by ZenithOptimedia finding that TV advertising still accounts for 39.6% of adspend in 2014, television advertising and its workflow is a growing industry.

Even with the increase of online streaming and Video on Demand, 86% of TV programs in the UK are still watched on television in 2015.

== Developments ==
=== The rise of digital delivery ===
In recent years, the use of tapes in global ad delivery has been dwindling, with most deliveries now being file-based or cloud-based. Large creative agencies & post houses such as Framestore, MPC, The Mill & Envy have spoken about how they have invested in digital workflows to accommodate this progress:

Increased digital integration and new digital advertising formats will continue to fuel the demand for digital content, assets and bespoke solutions

— MPC, Televisual

In 2007, Sky (then known as BSkyB) which is the UK's largest pay TV service, was accepting 80% of its advertising intake digitally. Simon Cox, the CEO of IMD (Independent Media Distribution, an advertising delivery company) predicted the move to complete digital delivery within a few years.

The move to tapeless delivery is not only taking hold in the UK:

- In India, suppliers have created platforms which focus on digital deliveries citing time and cost efficiencies as well as the aim to reduce the carbon footprint of an ad delivery. Ad Spending in India is predicted to grow 39% in 2016
- In Singapore, technology company eBUS developed a digital delivery platform to increase speed of delivery and to minimise the chance for human error

=== The rise of multiscreen technology ===
The increase of multiscreen viewing (audience viewing content through additional screens: online, mobiles, tablets) is growing all the time. in 2014, Forbes found that 48% of people globally are looking at another device whilst simultaneously watching TV during prime-time. The result has been that advertisers have been challenged with how to maintain the effectiveness of their campaigns despite the constant distractions from other smart devices. AOL found that when a viewer is distracted by another screen, the recall rate on a TV advert drops from 83% to 23% with nearly 60% of US viewers engaged in another screen whilst watching TV.

== Workflow ==
TV advertising workflow: The way it looks.

There are variations in this workflow, with some organisations choosing to take on more than one part of the workflow (i.e. An advertising distribution company may also handle the duties usually associated with a media agency etc.).

However, the usual components and duties are as follows:

Advertiser/brand
The beginning of every ad on TV begins with the brand or advertiser. They will have a product that requires marketing and will initiate the process.

Creative agency
The brand will work with a creative agency to create the visuals & script for the ad. This step involves the development of the campaign and the actualisation of the project (the shooting of the ad)

Post production house
The post production house will edit & finish the ad

Media agency
The media agency will handle the booking and organisation of the airtime booking for the ad.

Advertising distribution specialists
Due to the number of legal and technical specifics that are required, most broadcasters will only accept deliveries from a small number of specialists across the world. These specialists deliver the ads to broadcasters and online (VOD) destinations.

== Challenges ==
Due to the technical and regional nuances involved, TV advertising delivery can be difficult:

=== Regional clearances and legal guidelines ===
Ads must adhere to their local advertising regulations. The final step in getting an advert to air is most commonly gaining clearance from relevant governing bodies and delivering the ad to broadcasters—though this is dependent on regional requirements. Different regions around the world require levels of clearance before an ad can be approved for broadcast. This is usually related to legal requirements as stated by relevant governing bodies. Ads pertaining to certain industries (the food & medicines industries are usually most contentious) are most strictly regulated and are often subject to strict guidelines which need approving. In Britain, the body that governs clearance on ads is Clearcast. They pre-approve a majority of television advertising that goes to air against a set of criteria ranging from taste to technical constraints. Similar bodies are found in other regional markets and the same consideration must be given when producing all creative for television advertising. They check whether ads are adhering to Ofcom guidelines such as harmful flashing which can affect viewers with photosensitive epilepsy (PSE).

=== Regional tech specs ===
Different regions require ads supplied in various different technical specifications –these may affect audio levels regulation & aspect ratio. This means that one ad may need to be transcoded to various different formats in order to satisfy different broadcaster's expectations. Specifications can also vary from broadcaster to broadcaster introducing further complexity to an advertising campaign.

== See also ==
- Advertising
- List of advertising agencies
- Television advertisement
