= Broadcast Advertising Clearance Centre =

The Broadcast Advertising Clearance Centre (BACC) was a non-governmental organisation which until the end of 2007 pre-approved most British television advertising. The work of the BACC has been taken over by Clearcast.

BACC approval was applied both to scripts and to the final commercials. The BACC applied a list of criteria which included both good taste and decency criteria, and also a variety of technical and even medical constraints (advertisements may not, for example, contain flashing which would set off attacks of photosensitive epilepsy).

The BACC was a department of ITV but funded by all of the participating British commercial television channels, in proportion to their viewing figures.

All TV commercials in the UK which were broadcast as part of a national campaign (i.e. on a national channel such as Channel 4, Channel Five, Sky etc.) had to be pre-approved by the BACC.

== Clearcast ==
As of 2008 the work (and staff) of the BACC was taken over by Clearcast. Whilst the BACC had been owned and administered only by ITV, Clearcast's shareholders include ITV, C4, Five, Sky, Turner, IDS and Viacom.

Clearcast was born out of The UK TV Administration Forum, which has representation from all major broadcasters, to develop a more effective means of managing its existing shared services within television administration. Clearcast will provide an effective one-stop resource for the administration of all audiovisual advertising.

Clearcast has also taken over management of the Attribution System from the board of TV Eye, as well as managing additional commercial and administration contracts and services going forward.

== The BACC process ==
Advertising agencies submit pre-production scripts before any significant expense is incurred in the production of a TV commercial to the BACC. Once submitted the agencies allocated Copy Group Executive will give initial comments on the script detailing broadcast timing restrictions, advice on the appropriate use of specific shots or imagery and requesting substantiation. An agency will then either adapt the script (because it does not comply or contains a claim which cannot be 'backed up') and submit relevant substantiation documents to the BACC executive.

A process of second-reading then takes place whereby the executive may request further information or approve the script.

The process of script submissions is to reduce the risk of agencies spending a significant outlay on a TV commercial which is later rejected because it is unacceptable.

Once a script submission is accepted an agency will produce a final (or 'clocked') TV commercial which also needs to be submitted for approval to the BACC. The agency can submit the 'clocked' ad in a variety of ways including on VHS, DVD or digitally via FTP using the digital copy clearance system.

Once received and ingested into the BACC system the ad is first checked for supers, a process which measures the height (in television lines) of required legal text ('the small print') to ensure it complies. The legal text height is 16 TV lines, measured on a flat-topped, lower case letter and anything less will be rejected. Legal text is also timed to ensure it is legible to the viewer.

Some ads fail at this point and the agency is forced to change the legal text to ensure it complies. After this stage the ad is subjected to a 'flash test' which ensures it will not cause health implications to sufferers of photosensitive epilepsy.

After this stage the commercial is screened by a Traffic Assistant who checks the ad and accompanying post-production script and relevant consignment details are full, valid and correct. Consignment details include relevant music, artists names and voice-over names.

Once this process is complete the ad is allocated to the relevant Copy Group Executive where it is viewed and placed 'on the reel' for the following day's morning meeting. The term 'on the reel' relates to a viewing which takes place every morning at 10am where a group of executives view each commercial and pass comments on whether it complies with the BCAP code. Most ads comply (because they are as per the initial script) but this viewing serves as a point of spotting otherwise unforeseen problems such as music which is not permitted or a style of cutting which does not show the product in an accurate light.

After the morning meeting, usually at 11:30am the copy group return to their desks and pass on feedback to the agencies and approve compliant commercials.

== See also ==
- CAP Code
- Ofcom
- Radio Advertising Clearance Centre
