= Shoptiques =

Shoptiques is an online marketplace for women’s clothing and home décor. The company was started by Harvard Business School graduate and former Goldman Sachs investment banker Olga Vidisheva. Shoptiques also provides services such as photography, shipping assistance, and digital marketing.

== History ==
Vidisheva spent her second year of Harvard Business School surveying over 800 boutiques to help her write the business plan for Shoptiques. After graduation, she launched the site in the Spring of 2012 with 25 boutiques on the site.

In November 2014, Shoptiques added its 1,000th boutique to the site. In March 2015, the company released its mobile app.

In July 2020, Olga Vidisheva stepped down from day-to-day operations of the company and Marc Gugliuzza and Elliot Djmal became Co-CEOs.

In January 2023, Shoptiques Business was rebranded as Material and it continues to operate the Shoptiques online marketplace as well as a point of sale system for independent retailers.

== Business Model ==
Shoptiques generates revenue based on commission, taking a percentage of each sale made on the site. Each boutique curates its own selection of products on the site and customers can purchase products from multiple boutiques with a single checkout experience.
