= Cloudscaling =

Cloudscaling Group, Inc.
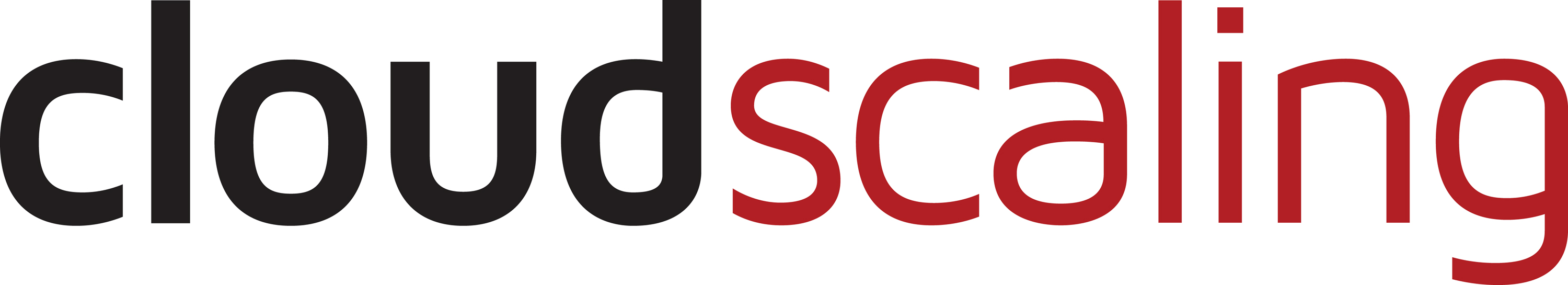
- Type: Private
- Industry: Cloud computing
- Founded: San Francisco, California, United States (2006)
- Founder: Randy Bias, Adam Waters
- Headquarters: San Francisco, California, U.S.
- Website: www.cloudscaling.com

The 'Cloudscaling Group, Inc. was a software company based in San Francisco, California, USA. The company’s Open Cloud System is a cloud computing system based on the OpenStack open-source software project. It is used to deploy infrastructure as a service (IaaS) public, private, and hybrid clouds that support applications typically found on public cloud infrastructures such as Amazon Web Services or Google Compute Engine. These applications are often called cloud-ready applications; Cloudscaling refers to them as dynamic applications and contrasts them with traditional enterprise IT applications.

== History ==
Cloudscaling was founded in 2006 by Randy Bias and Adam Waters. It started as a professional services company selling custom cloud infrastructure for large service providers, chiefly telecom service providers. The company’s engineering team had previously worked on cloud projects for Yahoo!, Amazon Web Services, VMware and Puppet Labs. KT Corporation (formerly Korea Telecom) was an early customer, for which the company in 2010 designed and deployed a cloud with CloudStack software and another that was the first OpenStack storage cloud (Swift) outside of Rackspace. Cloudscaling also designed and deployed an OpenStack Swift storage cloud for Internap in 2011.

In February 2012, the company shifted its focus to become a product company, announcing version 1.0 of Open Cloud System.

In early 2013, the company announced the general availability of Open Cloud System 2.0 and announced Ubisoft, Living Social and EVault as reference customers. The company in April signed partnerships with both Seagate Technology and Juniper Networks, both of which joined Trinity Ventures in a Series B round valued at $10 million.

In October 2014, the company was purchased by EMC Corporation for an undisclosed sum.
