= Clearcast =

British broadcasting NGO

Clearcast is a non-governmental organisation which pre-approves most British television advertising. It originated on 1 January 2008, and took over the responsibilities of the Broadcast Advertising Clearance Centre. Clearcast is now owned by four UK commercial broadcasters: ITV, Channel 4, Sky and Warner Bros. Discovery

Clearcast approval is applied both to scripts and to the final commercials. Clearcast has to check that commercials comply with the Broadcast Committee of Advertising Practice (BCAP) code (rules) that applies to television advertising. They also clear video on demand adverts for the major broadcasters against the non-broadcast (CAP) code (rules). These include both good taste and decency criteria, and also a variety of technical and even medical constraints (advertisements may not, for example, contain flashing which would set off attacks of photosensitive epilepsy).

The current Chairman of Clearcast is Mark White. Samantha Smith has been announced as Managing Director replacing Chris Mundy in April 2020.

== The copy clearance process ==
Advertising agencies submit pre-production scripts to Clearcast before any significant expense is incurred in the production of a TV commercial. The process of script submissions is to reduce the risk of agencies spending a significant outlay on a TV commercial which is later rejected because it is unacceptable. Once submitted, the agency's allocated copy group executive will give initial comments on the script, detailing broadcast timing restrictions, advice on appropriate use of specific shots or imagery and requesting substantiation. Substantiation must be submitted where a claim is made in a broadcast commercial. An agency will then adapt the script (because it does not comply with broadcast standards or contains a claim which cannot be corroborated) and submit relevant substantiation documents to the Clearcast executive.

A process of second-reading then takes place, whereby the executive may request further information or approve the script.

Once a script submission is accepted, an agency will produce a final (or 'clocked') TV commercial, which also needs to be submitted for approval to Clearcast. The agency must then submit the 'clocked' ad digitally via FTP using the digital copy clearance system (CopyCentral).

Once received and ingested into the Clearcast system, the ad is first checked for 'supers', a process which measures the height (in television lines) of required legal text ('the small print') to ensure it complies. The legal text height is 16 TV lines, measured on a flat-topped, lower case letter; anything less than this will be rejected. Legal text is also timed to ensure it is legible to the viewer.

Some ads fail at this point, and the agency is forced to modify the legal text in order to ensure it complies in terms of line height and duration on screen. After this stage, the ad is subjected to a Harding test (also known as a flash test), which ensures it will not cause sufferers of photosensitive epilepsy to have seizures.

Subsequently, the commercial is screened by a traffic assistant, who checks the ad and guarantees that the accompanying post-production script and relevant consignment details are comprehensive, valid and correct. Consignment details include relevant music, artists' names and voice-over names.

Once this process is complete, the ad is allocated to the relevant copy group executive, where it is viewed and placed 'on the reel' for the following day's morning meeting. The term 'on the reel' relates to a viewing which takes place every morning at 10 am, in which a group of executives view each commercial and pass comments on whether it complies with the BCAP code (the Broadcast Committee of Advertising Practice). Most ads comply (because they are produced as per the initial script), but this viewing serves as a way of spotting otherwise unforeseen problems, such as music which is not permitted or a style of editing which does not show the product in an accurate light. It is at this point that any relevant restrictions (for instance on timing) are applied to the commercial.

After the morning meeting (which usually ends at 11:30 am), the copy group return to their desks and pass on feedback to the agencies involved and approve compliant commercials.

The same process also applies to video-on-demand (VoD) commercials that are destined for services provided by Clearcast's shareholders, as well as Virgin Media.

== Other activities ==
Working with Peach Media (previously IMD), Clearcast manage the Attribution service which links advertiser, agency and product category metadata with Broadcasters' Audience Research Board (BARB) data on brands advertised on TV.

They also commission the CARIA service from Peach Media.^{[7]} CARIA is a system developed and owned by Peach Media, part of Peach video on which airtime bookings are confirmed to Sales Houses by advertising agencies and on which copy to be used for each booking is specified - it is widely used across UK & Ireland.

They also run a Training Programme which is CPD Certified and IPA recognised that runs courses for agencies, advertisers and broadcasters to help them get to grips with advertising rules and how to work within them.

In 2010, Clearcast launched an online flash test in partnership with Cambridge Research Systems Ltd. who develop the Hardings flash testing technology.

In 2012, Clearcast launched three new services under the Clearcast Plus banner: Copy Development, TV Admin and Editing.

In 2019, Clearcast launched a Fast Track service that guarantees feedback on your script or video submission within 24 hours.

== Legal status for judicial review ==
Clearcast is a privately owned company. A case brought to the High Court by Diomed Direct sought to show that Clearcast's decisions were public functions subject to judicial review.

The court ruled in April 2016 that Clearcast does not exercise functions of a public nature. Broadcasters make private arrangements through Clearcast to secure public law objectives (compliance with the BCAP Code) but this is not sufficient. Clearcast assists with the broadcasters' functions: if a broadcaster decided not to approve an advertisement because of a risk of an adverse finding by Ofcom, that decision would not be amenable to judicial review.

== Incidents ==
=== Denial of Greenpeace video submitted by Iceland Foods Ltd (2018) ===
In 2018, Greenpeace released an animated short, starring a fictional orangutan named Rang-tan ahead of the World Orangutan Day (which took place on 19 August). The short was produced to raise awareness of the environmental impact of the production of palm oil, and the dangers orangutans face as a result.

In November 2018, Iceland Foods Ltd submitted a version of the Rang-tan video (which they were to use as their television advertisement for the Christmas season that year) to Clearcast. Earlier in 2018, Iceland Foods has announced that it would remove palm oil from the company's own products by the end of the year, and the company's use of the Greenpeace short was an extension to the earlier effort. The version, as submitted by the supermarket chain, did not contain any reference to Greenpeace. However, Clearcast, highlighting where the video came from, denied the retailer's submission of the animated advertisement.

Clearcast's reasoning for denial was that, under Broadcaster Licences and Section 7 of the BCAP Code, as Greenpeace is both an environmental organisation and a lobbying group, Greenpeace should provide enough information to Clearcast to prove that they are not a political advertiser. However, as Greenpeace did not supply such information to Clearcast as of November 2018, Clearcast could not determine whether Greenpeace is a political advertiser or not, and the Rang-tan video was denied.

Despite the subsequent criticism and online petitions, Clearcast have defended their decision to deny the Rang-tan video.

== See also ==
- Ofcom
- Advertising Standards Authority (United Kingdom)
- BCAP Code
