= Carbonite, Inc. =

American technology company

- Type: Subsidiary
- Traded as: Nasdaq: CARB
- Founded: February 23, 2006; 20 years ago
- Headquarters: Boston, Massachusetts, U.S.
- Parent: OpenText

Carbonite, Inc. is an American company that offers an online backup service, available to Windows and macOS users. In 2019 it was acquired by Canadian software company OpenText. It backs up documents, e-mails, music, photos, and settings. It is named after carbonite, the fictional substance used to freeze Han Solo in Star Wars: The Empire Strikes Back. Carbonite was the first such service to offer unlimited backup space for a fixed price. Previously, all online backup services were priced by the gigabyte.

Carbonite offers two separate lines of products: Carbonite Home and Home Office for individuals, families, and one- or two-person businesses; and Carbonite Small Business for businesses with three or more computers.

At one time in its history, Carbonite was named "Best Windows Backup Tool" by Lifehacker, "Labs Winner" by PC Pro, and "Editor's Choice" by NextAdvisor, but received only "two mice" in a MacWorld review putting it second to last.

== Product details ==
Carbonite Online Backup installs a client software program on the user’s computer that operates continuously in the background. This client software automatically seeks out new and changed files on the user’s computer and backs them up using incremental backup. Each file is compressed and encrypted using a 128-bit Blowfish encryption before it is sent to remote servers at the company's data centers via the Internet. (This of course requires that the user's computer be continually connected to the internet, and the speed of the internet connection will impact system performance.) Data is transmitted to the servers using a secure SSL link. The encrypted files are stored on 15-drive RAID 6 storage arrays.

The program is designed to automatically back up user-generated content including text documents, spreadsheets, financial documents, photos, music, etc. The 2017 PC Magazine review found that a few audio files and photos were omitted from the backup without obvious reason.

Videos and files larger than 4 gb require manual backup in the base-priced version. The terms allow Carbonite to release information to law enforcement upon demand or if Carbonite suspects illegal use. This would help law enforcement if Carbonite can give them the encryption key, which they can for all Mac and most Windows users. Windows users can manage their own key by selecting "Advanced" during installation. Users cannot make the key private later if they initially let Carbonite manage it.

If Carbonite manages the key, users can download files to any computer. If the user manages the key, user can only access files from the backed up computer (File Explorer/This PC/Carbonite Drive), and if that computer is inaccessible, the user must upload and let Carbonite manage the key before accessing the backed up files from another computer.

The Terms let Carbonite delete files with or without notice, but normally they keep the three most recent versions, and one version per day for the past week, one per week for 3 weeks before that, and 1 per month for 2 and 3 months ago. They also delete files which were deleted by the user more than 30 days before, or when payment ends. Carbonite offers telephone support to recover from ransomware viruses. Terms also disclaim any warranties and damages, require arbitration in Boston, and disallow class action suits. Terms require users to pay (indemnify) Carbonite's losses if they relate to improper actions by the user.

On a Windows PC, Carbonite backs up everything in the Documents and Settings folder, including the desktop, favorites, and all other files except for temporary, log and video files. Any file or folder can be added to the default backup if it is on a local (internal) drive formatted with the FAT32 or NTFS file systems. (According to the Carbonite website, the Home version will only backup internal drives whereas the HomePlus and HomePremium versions will also backup external drives.) The backup software integrates with Windows Explorer, adding green dots to the file icons of any backed up file. Adding or removing files from the backup is done using the right mouse button and the Windows context menus. The Windows version of Carbonite will keep multiple versions of backed up files.

Carbonite can recover from some forms of Ransomware but this requires contacting Carbonite customer service.

For Intel-based Macs running Mac OS X 10.4 (Tiger) or 10.5 (Leopard), Carbonite is controlled through System Preferences and using the contextual menu. File systems supported 'by default' on Mac OS X are supported by the Mac client with the exception of FAT.

The program also includes a remote access application that allows individual files to be downloaded to any computer using a web browser.

== Company history ==
CEO David Friend and CTO Jeff Flowers founded Carbonite in 2005, the fifth joint venture for the pair who also together founded Computer Pictures, Pilot Software, FaxNet and Sonexis. Friend had also been an executive at ARP Instruments, Inc., a pioneering electronic music synthesizer manufacturer, in the 1970s.

The product debuted at Staples in 2006 when it focused on photo backup and offered a free six-month subscription with all camera purchases. It partnered with Microsoft in 2006 to include the program with purchase of Microsoft Money 2007, and renewed the following year for the 2008 edition. Since its launch in 2006, Carbonite has backed up more than 100 billion files and has restored more than 7 billion lost files for its customers.

In 2007 it was named ‘Top Private Company’ by AlwaysOn in 2007.

Carbonite introduced their Macintosh version for Intel-based Macs with OS 10.4 or 10.5 in March 2009.

It has partnered with several other backup, storage, and file transfer companies: with Ipswitch, Inc. in 2007 to provide the service to purchasers of their FTP client, OLBEX in 2007 to offer the service to U.S. cable companies, Sonic Solutions in 2008 to provide core technologies for their digital media storage solution, and with TDS Telecom in 2008 to provide core technologies for their online backup service, and with LaCie in 2008, to power their online backup. It partnered with Lifeboat Distribution in 2008, to enhance distribution coverage within North America.

It partnered with Packard Bell in 2008, the first partnership between an independent online backup company and major PC manufacturer, providing all purchasers of their desktop and notepad computers in Europe a free four-month subscription. It subsequently partnered also with Lenovo in 2008, to have the service pre-loaded on their PCs, and with Acer to have their online backup service pre-installed on select PCs. Acer signed on for a similar arrangement in 2009.

In 2009, it admitted loss of backups of "over 7,500 customers" in a lawsuit filed against Promise Technology, a hardware provider.

On June 6, 2011, Carbonite acquired Phanfare. Carbonite declined to honor Phanfare lifetime memberships, instead granting lifetime members $299 in Phanfare credit which would expire after three years if unused. Two days later, Phanfare founder and CEO, Andrew Erlichson notified lifetime subscribers that customers requesting a refund will be paid not by Carbonite, but what remains of Phanfare, Inc.

In 2017, Carbonite acquired Mozy, a cloud-based backup solution from Dell Technologies for $145.8 million.

In 2019, Carbonite acquired Webroot, which delivers multi-vector Cybersecurity protection for endpoints and networks, as well as threat intelligence services to protect businesses and individuals for $618.5 million.

On November 11, 2019, Open Text Corporation announced it had signed a definitive agreement to acquire Carbonite Inc. for $23.00 per share USD in cash.

== Funding ==
In 2006, it secured $2.5 million in series A financing from 3i, Keiretsu Forum and CommonAngels; in 2007 it completed $15 million series B financing led by Menlo Ventures. in 2008 it secured additional $5 million in series B-2 funding and completed C round financing with approximately $20 million of new capital, led by Performance Equity of Stamford, Connecticut; in 2010 it closed a mezzanine round of funding with the total financing raised to $67 million. Carbonite made its IPO in August 2011, raising $62.5 million in its offering.

On 4 Feb 2013, Carbonite announced that its net loss for the full year 2012 was ($18.9) million, compared to ($23.5) million in 2011. Since its inception in 2005, NASDAQ:CARB has lost in excess of ($120,000,000) of public and private investment. The company's SEC financial reports state: "We expect to continue to incur GAAP operating losses on an annual basis for the foreseeable future".

== Amazon review controversy ==
Carbonite reviews on Amazon were a subject of controversy in early 2009. Apparently, employees of the company posted favorable testimonial-style ads on Amazon in 2006, including those by senior members of the management team. Additionally, The New York Times reported that the CEO was made aware of the situation in September 2008 but did nothing to remove the false postings until the NY Times blog appeared in January 2009.

== Misleading advertising controversy ==
The Advertising Standards Authority (ASA) in the United Kingdom ruled on August 1, 2012, that Carbonite had misled consumers by describing its online backup as unlimited. Following a complaint, the ASA investigated and found that due to bandwidth restrictions for uploading data, which limit upload to 2 Mbit/s for the first 200 GB but then to only 100 kbit/s once 200 GB had been exceeded, the backup was not unlimited. Therefore, the advert was "likely to mislead consumers".

Additionally, Carbonite breached rule 1.7 of the CAP Code for failing to respond to the ASA's charges.

In 2014, Carbonite stated that they have eliminated bandwidth throttling for all of their customers.

== Releases ==
- version 1.4 (late 2005) of Carbonite Photo Backup
- version 2.0 (May 2006) Carbonite Unlimited Backup
- version 2.1 (February 2007) with added support for Windows Vista
- version 2.3 (June 2007) with added block-level incremental backup
- Launch (2007) of Online Backup Service in French and German
- version 3.0 (August 2007) with added online backup simplification processes
- version 3.5 (January 2008) with enhanced user controls and saving up to three months of previous file versions
- Launches (2008) Dutch, Portuguese, Spanish and Japanese versions
- version 3.6 (June 2008) with improved backup speed for large files and other performance enhancements
- version 3.7 (March 2009) with user-requested enhancements
- Adds remote file access (2009)
- Launches (2009) Carbonite Online Backup for Intel-based Macs with OS 10.4 or 10.5 in March 2009
- version 4.0 ( September 2010)
- Releases iPad app and updates for iPhone and BlackBerry apps
- Launches (2011) Carbonite Small Business offering

== See also ==
- Comparison of online backup services
- List of backup software (includes managed backup providers)
