= How to Buy, Sell, and Profit on eBay =

2005 book

- Author: Adam Ginsberg
- Language: English
- Published: 2005 (HarperCollins)
- Publication place: United States
- ISBN: 978-0060762872

How to Buy, Sell, and Profit on eBay is a book by Adam Ginsberg about how to start a business selling things on the online marketplace and auction website eBay. The book was first published in 2005 by HarperCollins.

== Reception ==
The book has received reviews from publications including Miami Herald, The Boston Globe, and Booklist. According to the Miami Herald, “Ginsberg’s excitement is palpable and infectious, but more importantly, it provides an excellent medium for instruction."
