= EVault =

Backup software company

- Type: Business unit of Carbonite
- Industry: Data Backup; Data Recovery; Disaster Recovery; Cloud Storage Services
- Founded: 1997
- Headquarters: Boston, Massachusetts
- Key people: Paul Mellinger, SVP and General Manager

EVault is a part of Carbonite, and a brand name for some of Carbonite's products, headquartered in Boston, Massachusetts. EVault and its partner network develop and support on-premises, cloud-based, and hybrid backup and recovery services for mid-market customers in need of data backup, data recovery, disaster recovery, regulatory compliance, and cloud storage or online backup services.

The company primarily serves customers in heavily regulated industries, including financial and health care services, government, education, telecommunications, and charity/nonprofit sectors. The company also has sales, service, and data center operations in North America and EMEA.

== History ==
EVault was founded in 1997 as a cloud services company. By 2006, EVault had become, through revenues and acquisitions (including the Open File Manager product line from St. Bernard Software), one of the fastest-growing technology companies in North America.

Seagate Technology acquired EVault in 2007. In September 2008, Seagate rebranded EVault and other acquisitions into id i365, a Seagate Company. Seagate Recovery Services was taken from the i365 basket in 2011. In December 2011, the EVault name was restored.

On 16 December 2015, Carbonite acquired Seagate's EVault cloud backup service, including the brand name and logo, for $14M USD. In April 2017, Carbonite EVault became Carbonite Server Backup.

In 2019, Carbonite was acquired by OpenText.

== Backup and Recovery Products and Services ==
The EVault line includes disk-based software, appliances, and software-as-a-service or SaaS, all of which share a common technology platform. The company encourages customers to deploy EVault on-premises and offsite technologies in combination as hybrid, or "cloud-connected," solutions.

- EVault SaaS for cloud-based backup and recovery.
- EVault Cloud Disaster Recovery Service for managed recovery in the EVault cloud with 4-, 24-, and 48-hour Service Level Agreements.
- EVault Plug-n-Protect for appliance-based, on-premises, all-in-one backup and recovery.
- EVault Software for disk-to-disk, on-premises backup and recovery.
- EVault Endpoint Protection for integrated backup, recovery, and data security for laptops and desktops.
