= Advertising Association =

British trade association

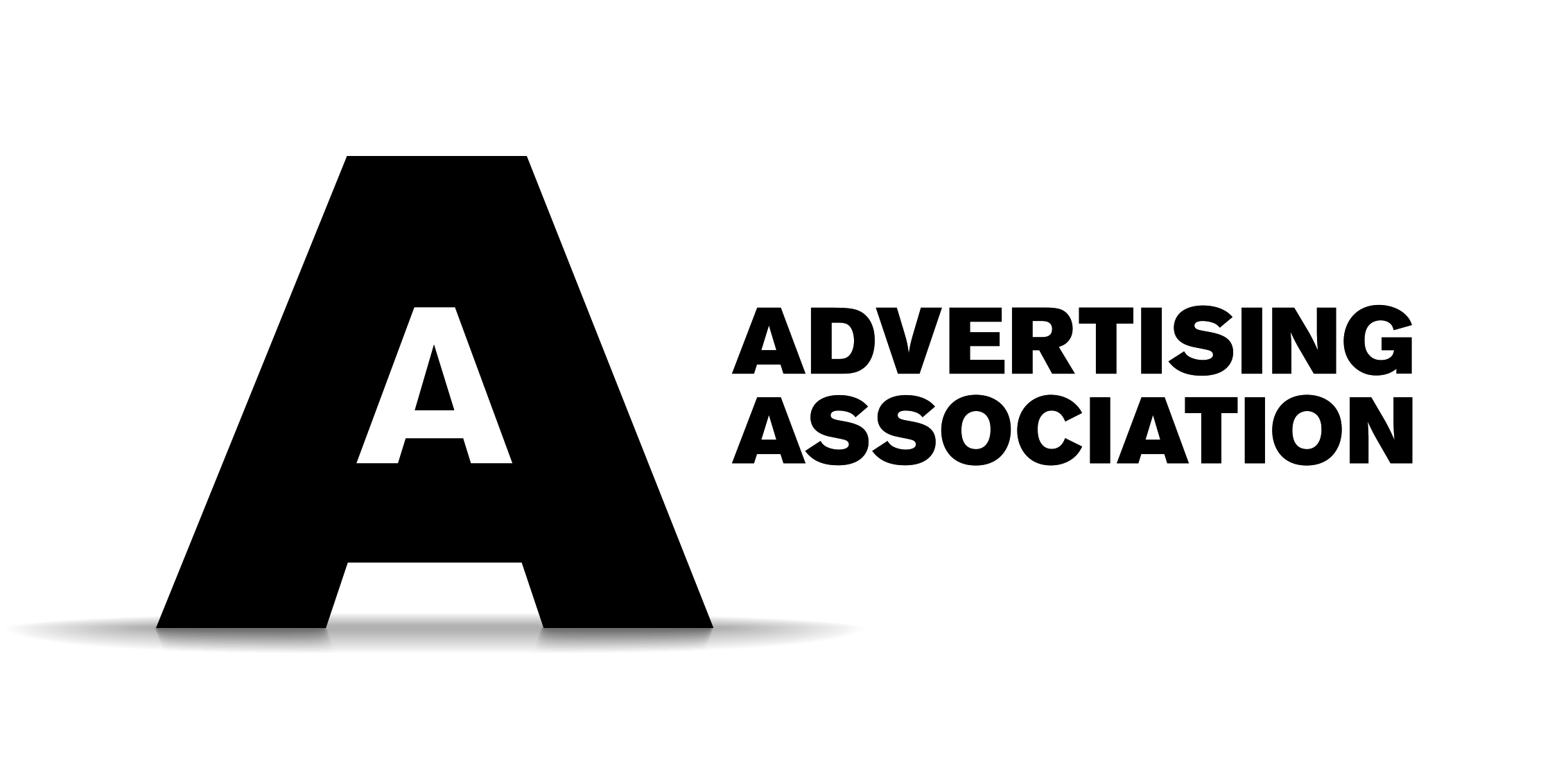
- Formation: 1924
- Legal status: Trade Association
- Region served: United Kingdom
- Members: 100+
- Chief Executive: Stephen Woodford
- Key people: Stephen Woodford, Chief Executive; Andria Vidler, President

The Advertising Association (AA) is a trade association representing advertisers, agencies, media and research services in the UK advertising industry. Its chief executive is Stephen Woodford.

The organisation represents the advertising industry to the UK government, policy-makers and opinion-formers, presenting evidence-based information to influence government decision-making. It references the work of the advertising industry’s think tank, Credos, which produces research reports on UK advertising industry issues.

Its stated aim is to promote the “…role, rights and responsibilities of advertising and its impact on individuals, the economy and society".

According to the Marketing Agencies Association (MAA), the Advertising Association is 'the only body that speaks for all sides of [the industry]'.

In 2024, the UK advertising market grew by 10.4 % to £42.6 billion, and it was forecast to reach £45.2 billion in 2025.

== History ==
In 1924 the British section of the Associated Advertising Clubs of the World (AACW) — known as “District 14” — staged the International Advertising Convention at Wembley.

Over the next two years, that group and other industry‑clubs and bodies, including organisations whose successors were the Institute of Practitioners in Advertising (IPA) and Incorporated Society of British Advertisers (ISBA), came together and in 1926 established the national body now known as the Advertising Association.

Meanwhile earlier professional industry associations such as the IPA (founded 1917) and ISBA (founded 1923) had already been active in representing the interests of advertisers and agencies, meaning that the AA’s formation reflected a wider coalescence of multiple strands of the UK advertising industry.

== Membership ==
The Advertising Association’s core membership comprises around 30 organisations, including technology and media companies as well as other industry associations for advertising, marketing and media.

== Operations ==
The CEO of the Advertising Association is Stephen Woodford, and its President is Andria Vidler. Previous chairs and presidents have included Alessandra Bellini, Dame Cilla Snowball, Andy Duncan, Gavin Patterson, James Murphy and Jeremy Bullmore.

The Advertising Association’s board contains members from other related bodies, such as the IPA, the Incorporated Society of British Advertisers (ISBA), ITV, Google and the News Media Association (NMA).

The Advertising Association’s council comprises several large advertisers who work with the AA on major policy initiatives, such as its campaign to increase public trust in advertising.

=== Advertising Association Council ===
The Advertising Association Council consists of agencies, brands and media. It has two roles, one regulatory, one industry-facing. On behalf of industry, Council guides the development of the self-regulatory system and sets advertising policy. The Committee of Advertising Practice (CAP) and the Broadcast Committee of Advertising Practice (BCAP), write the advertising codes and the Advertising Standards Authority (ASA) independently enforces them across all media. The Council meets three times a year.

=== LEAD and MBC ===
The Advertising Association runs LEAD, an annual industry summit at the start of each year, which brings together politicians and representatives from different parts of the advertising industry to discuss key issues. The Advertising Association also organises the Media Business Course (MBC), each year about the art of media planning and pitching — where delegates tackle a client brief and then present in front of industry experts.

== Policy areas ==
In 2018, the Advertising Association set up the Trust Working Group to assess and counter the decline in the public’s trust in advertising. It brings together advertisers, agencies, media owners, tech platforms, as well as fellow trade associations ISBA and IPA. Its research suggests that only 25% of the UK public had a favourable attitude towards advertising, a record low. The Advertising Association report set out specific actions needed to boost trust, such as stopping excessive advertising and retargeting, and ensuring that data privacy is safeguarded.

The Advertising Association has provided evidence in support of maintaining and not extending current restrictions on advertising of foods high in fat, salt and sugar (HFSS). Citing its own research, the Association found that children’s exposure to such advertising has already reduced substantially in recent years. It has also supported the creation of a media campaign to promote responsible gambling.

In 2018, the Advertising Association partnered with the National Advertising Benevolent Society (NABS) and Women in Advertising and Communications, London (WACL) to establish the timeTo initiative, addressing the issue of sexual harassment within the industry.

On Brexit, the Advertising Association believes the industry may be adversely affected if non-British workers left the country. It has demanded more clarity with regard to access to talent, cross-border data flows, and freedom to advertise on cross-border television channels.

In February 2026, as part of the Advertising Association marking its Centenary year, the book Trusted Advertising, How to harness the value of trust in your brand, written by Matt Bourn and James Best CBE, was published by Kogan Page.

=== AI in Advertising ===
With Artificial Intelligence playing a transformative role in advertising, the Advertising Association established an AI Taskforce focused on showcasing the applications of AI in advertising and identifying the skills the workforce will need. In March 2026 they published an AI Skills e-book. The Skills and Growth Working Group also produced a report looking at how ambitious reform of apprenticeships will allow the sector to grow.

== Related associations ==
=== Front Foot ===
In 2010, the Advertising Association set up Front Foot, a members’ network for the advertising industry. It includes advertisers, agencies and technology companies. It aims to convey a uniform industry view that is “…authoritative, evidence-based and progressive".

=== Credos ===
In 2010, the Advertising Association also formed Credos, the advertising industry’s think tank, which aims to evidence the value of UK advertising and inform industry efforts to be more trusted, inclusive, and sustainable.

It produces research and reports to better understand advertising: its role, how it works, how it is perceived and its value to UK society, culture and the economy.

The long-running Advertising Pays series of reports, quantifies the economic contribution of advertising to the UK economy. The 2025 report, and ninth edition in the series reported that UK businesses spent £66.6 billion on advertising in 2024, generating £108.6 billion in gross value added, equivalent to around 4% of the UK’s total GVA, and supporting approximately 1.7 million jobs, 5% of all UK employment. In addition, the export of advertising services by UK businesses totalled £17.9 billion in 2024, the second highest in the world after the United States.

Previous iterations of Advertising Pays, which began in 2013, cover advertising’s impact on SME growth, value to the creative and cultural industries, exports, attracting talent, and digital technology.

Credos has also been tracking public trust in advertising since 2010. Following years of declining public trust in advertising, its quarterly monitor has recorded increasing levels of trust in recent years.

=== Ad Net Zero ===
In November 2020, Ad Net Zero was founded as a cross-industry climate action programme led by the Advertising Association in partnership with the IPA and ISBA to help the advertising sector decarbonise operations and support the promotion of sustainable products, services and behaviours.

Since its launch, the programme has grown into a global initiative with national chapters, training and resources, and a growing supporter base of advertisers, agencies, media owners and technology providers. It runs capacity-building activities (including working groups aligned to the five action pillars), promotes standard practices for low-carbon production and procurement, and jointly runs the annual Campaign Ad Net Zero Awards to recognise campaigns and organisations that demonstrate measurable progress toward net zero; the Awards publish a public shortlist each year and hold a ceremony in November.

AdGreen is a core component of Ad Net Zero's five-point action plan, specifically driving Action 2: Curb Emissions from Advertising Production. It focuses on enabling the advertising industry to measure, understand, and reduce carbon emissions from production activities (motion, stills, audio) to achieve zero waste/zero carbon emissions.

In June 2025, Ad Net Zero published the first major update to its Global Media Sustainability Framework (GMSF v1.2), setting out a consistent methodology for estimating and reporting advertising-related greenhouse-gas emissions across six media channels (Digital, TV, OOH, Print, Audio and Cinema).

== All In Census ==
The All In Census is an industry-wide inclusion survey conducted by the Advertising Association in partnership with the IPA and the ISBA as part of its Inclusion and Representation initiative.

Launched in 2021, the census aims to measure the lived experience, diversity, and sense of belonging of people working across the UK advertising and marketing industry. It provides data on areas such as gender, ethnicity, age, disability, sexual orientation, social mobility, mental health, and hybrid working, which are used to inform the industry’s All In Action Plan.

The inaugural 2021 All In Census collected over 16,000 responses, establishing the first baseline of workforce inclusion data for the sector. The 2023 edition received nearly 19,000 responses and reported a two-percentage-point rise in respondents who felt a sense of belonging (71 %), alongside a small reduction in reports of negative behaviour at work (15 %).

The 2025 All In Census gathered responses from more than 14,000 participants and found steady progress in inclusion and retention indicators, while introducing new themes related to hybrid working, mental health, and the impact of artificial intelligence in the workplace. The three censuses combined have produced data from nearly 50,000 respondents, providing the most comprehensive picture of inclusion across the UK advertising and marketing workforce to date.

Organisations that commit to implementing the recommendations from the Action Plan can become All In Champions, a status that publicly recognises their efforts to improve representation and workplace culture.

=== Media Smart ===
Set up in 2002, Media Smart is a non-profit organisation, funded by the advertising industry, that creates free media and digital literacy resources for teachers, parents and youth organisations working with 7-16-year olds. Recent education campaigns and resources have focussed on influencer marketing, social media, digital advertising and body image.

Media Smart’s supporter base brings together advertisers, agencies, media and trade bodies.

=== Advertising Exports and International Trade ===
The UK advertising and marketing industry exported £18 billion in services in 2023. The industry engages with government through the UK Advertising Exports Group (UKAEG), which was launched in March 2020 and includes 50 members from the UK advertising and marketing services sector. Supported by the Department for Business and Trade, UKAEG has participated in international industry events such as SXSW and Cannes Lions.
