= OpenText =

Canadian software company

Open Text Corporation

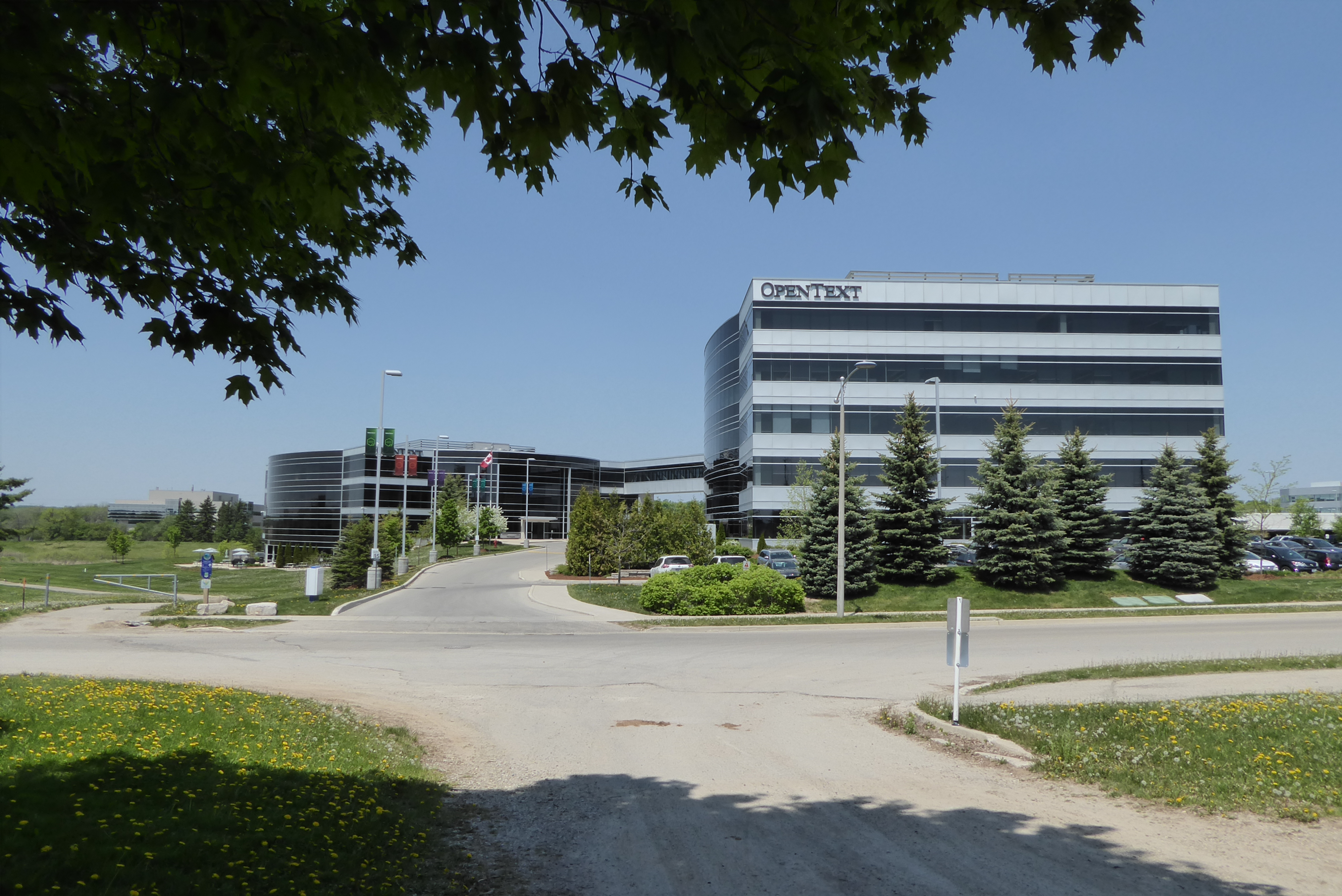
- Headquarters in Waterloo, Canada
- Type: Public
- Traded as: TSX: OTEX; Nasdaq: OTEX; S&P/TSX 60 component
- ISIN: CA6837151068
- Industry: Computer Software
- Founded: 1991; 35 years ago (as OpenText Corporation)
- Founders: Tim Bray; Gaston Gonnet; Frank Tompa
- Headquarters: Waterloo, Ontario, Canada
- Key people: Ayman Antoun CEO; James McGourlay CCO
- Products: Enterprise content management (ECM), business process management (BPM), customer experience management (CEM), information exchange, discovery and analytics software, cybersecurity software
- Revenue: ▼US$5.17 billion (2025)
- Operating income: ▲US$893 million (2025)
- Net income: ▼US$436 million (2025)
- Total assets: ▼US$13.8 billion (2025)
- Total equity: ▼US$3.93 billion (2025)
- Number of employees: 21,400 (2025)
- Subsidiaries: Carbonite, Inc.; Micro Focus; Webroot
- Website: opentext.com
- Footnotes; Financials as of June 30, 2025.

Open Text Corporation (styled as opentext) is a global software company that develops and sells information management software.

OpenText, headquartered in Waterloo, Ontario, Canada, is Canada's fourth-largest software company as of 2022.

OpenText software applications manage content and unstructured data for large companies, government agencies, and professional service firms. OpenText's main business offerings include data analytics, enterprise information management, AI, cloud solutions, security, and products that address information management requirements, including secure information management of large volumes of content, compliance with regulatory requirements, mobile and online experience management.

OpenText employs 22,900 people worldwide, and is a publicly traded company, listed on the Toronto Stock Exchange and the NASDAQ (OTEX).

== History ==
Anouar Namouh, with the University of Waterloo professors Frank Tompa and Gaston Gonnet, founded OpenText Corporation in 1991. It grew out of OpenText Systems Inc., founded in 1989. The founders spun the company off from a University of Waterloo project that developed technology to index the Oxford English Dictionary.

Key people involved later include Tom Jenkins, who joined the company as COO in 1994, and later became president and chief executive officer. John Shackleton served as president from 1998 to 2011 and as CEO from 2005 to 2011. Mark J. Barrenechea became the president and CEO of OpenText in 2012. Barrenechea was named Canadian Business CEO of the Year in 2015. In January 2016, Barrenechea became Chief Technology Officer. From January 2016, Steve Murphy served as the President; however, the company eliminated the position in Q1 2017.

In October 2012, it was announced that OpenText would support the University of Waterloo Stratford Campus, by contributing both funds and in-kind services to the school.

In July 2020, OpenText partnered with cybersecurity company NINJIO. The collaboration strengthens security awareness with videos showcasing detection of phishing emails and inappropriate URLs.

In February 2024, OpenText joined the Joint Cyber Defense Collaborative (JCDC), a United States Government cybersecurity initiative. The JCDC aims to improve cybersecurity readiness for the U.S. and its international partners. OpenText announced it would be providing a range of services and insights into safeguarding sensitive information.

In January 2025, it was announced that OpenText was chosen as one of Canada's Top Employers for Young People for 2025, as well as one of Canada's Most Responsible Companies of 2025.

OpenText suspended its business in Russia in 2022 after having made donations to support humanitarian efforts in Ukraine. The company stated it would only resume business when "the war ends and sanctions are lifted." In 2025, OpenText was declared an undesirable organization in Russia.

In August 2025, James McGourlay was appointed as the interim CEO of OpenText, replacing Mark Barrenechea.

In April 2026, Ayman Antoun was appointed CEO of OpenText.

== Acquisitions and divestitures ==
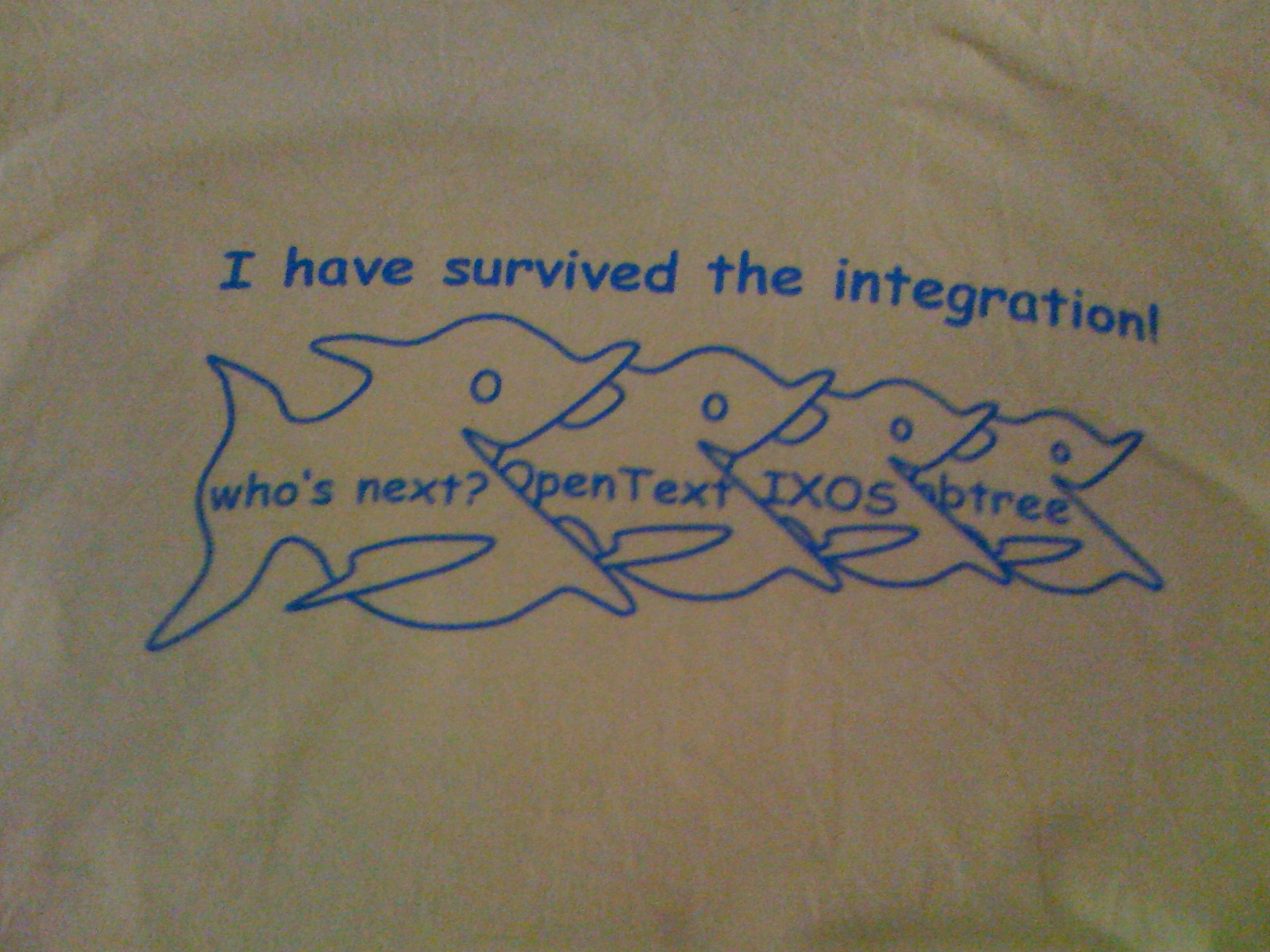
Humorous shirt caption detailing employee perspective on the IXOS Software acquisition and industry acquisitions in general

OpenText has acquired several businesses over the past two decades, beginning with IXOS Software AG in 2003, followed by Artesia in 2004. Other notable acquisitions include Hummingbird Ltd. in 2006 for $489 million, Captaris Inc. in 2008 for $131 million, and Vignette Corporation in 2009 for $321 million in cash and stock.

In the early 2010s, it acquired StreamServe Inc. for $71 million, EasyLink (2012) for $232 million, and GXS Inc., which had previously acquired Inovis, integrating the latter into the OpenText Business Network, which later acquired Inovis. In 2014, OpenText purchased Cordys for $33 million, and Actuate of San Mateo, California. The following year, it acquired Daegis for $13.5 million.

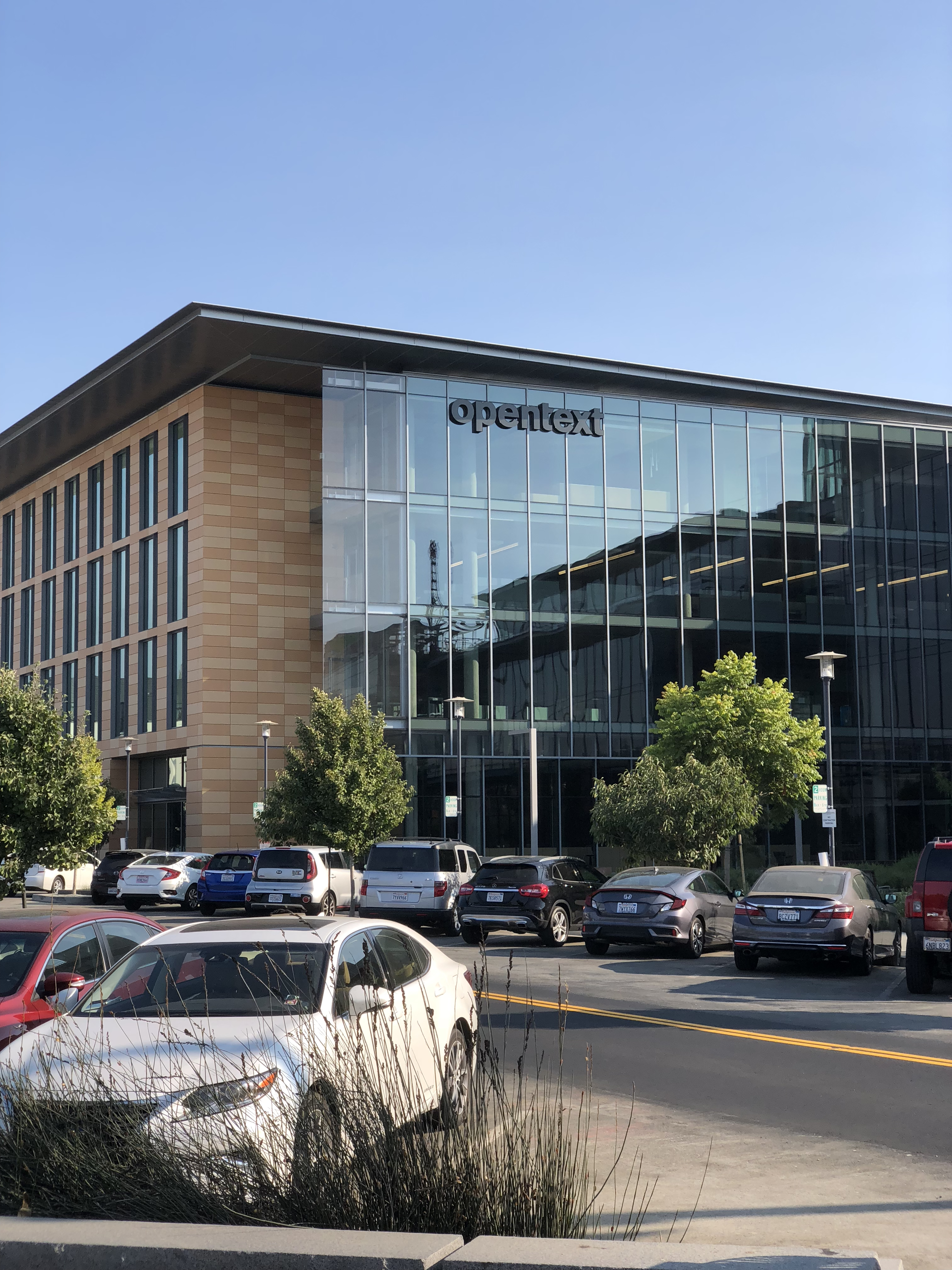
OpenText office in San Mateo, California

After Hewlett-Packard split into two companies, HP Enterprise and HP Inc., OpenText acquired HP customer experience content management from HP Inc. for approximately $170 million in April 2016. On September 12, 2016, OpenText further expanded its share of the enterprise content management software market by buying that division of Dell EMC, which included Documentum, for US$1.6 billion. OpenText had originally had Documentum and Hummingbird, Ltd., as its chief competitors in this space, but this acquisition brought the long-time third competitor in Documentum under one corporate roof. Also in 2016, OpenText acquired Recommind after previously engaging with the company as a strategic partner.

In 2017, OpenText acquired both Guidance Software for US$240 million, and Covisint for US$103 million, which they integrated into their OpenText Business Network. In 2018, OpenText acquired Liaison Technologies for US$310 million and integrated Liaison into their OpenText ALLOY Platform.

By early February 2019, OpenText acquired Catalyst Repository Systems. That same year, OpenText also acquired Carbonite Inc. (including Webroot and Mozy, which Carbonite Inc. had earlier acquired) for approximately US$1.45 billion. The following year, OpenText acquired Xmedius for US$75 million.

OpenText announced the planned acquisition of Zix Corp for US$860 million, and in November 2021, OpenText completed the acquisition of Bricata enabling next-generation Network Detection & Response (NDR) technology to the OpenText Security and Protection Cloud.

In 2022, OpenText announced it would acquire British software firm Micro Focus in a deal valued at US$6 billion, which finalized in January 2023. With the acquisition, OpenText also acquired a number of companies under Micro Focus, including Borland, HPE Software, and Interset.

In May 2024, OpenText divested its Application Modernization and Connectivity (AMC) business (former Micro Focus unit) to Rocket Software for US$2.28 billion.

In October 2025, OpenText announced the sale of its eDOCS business unit to NetDocuments for $163 million in cash.

== Products ==
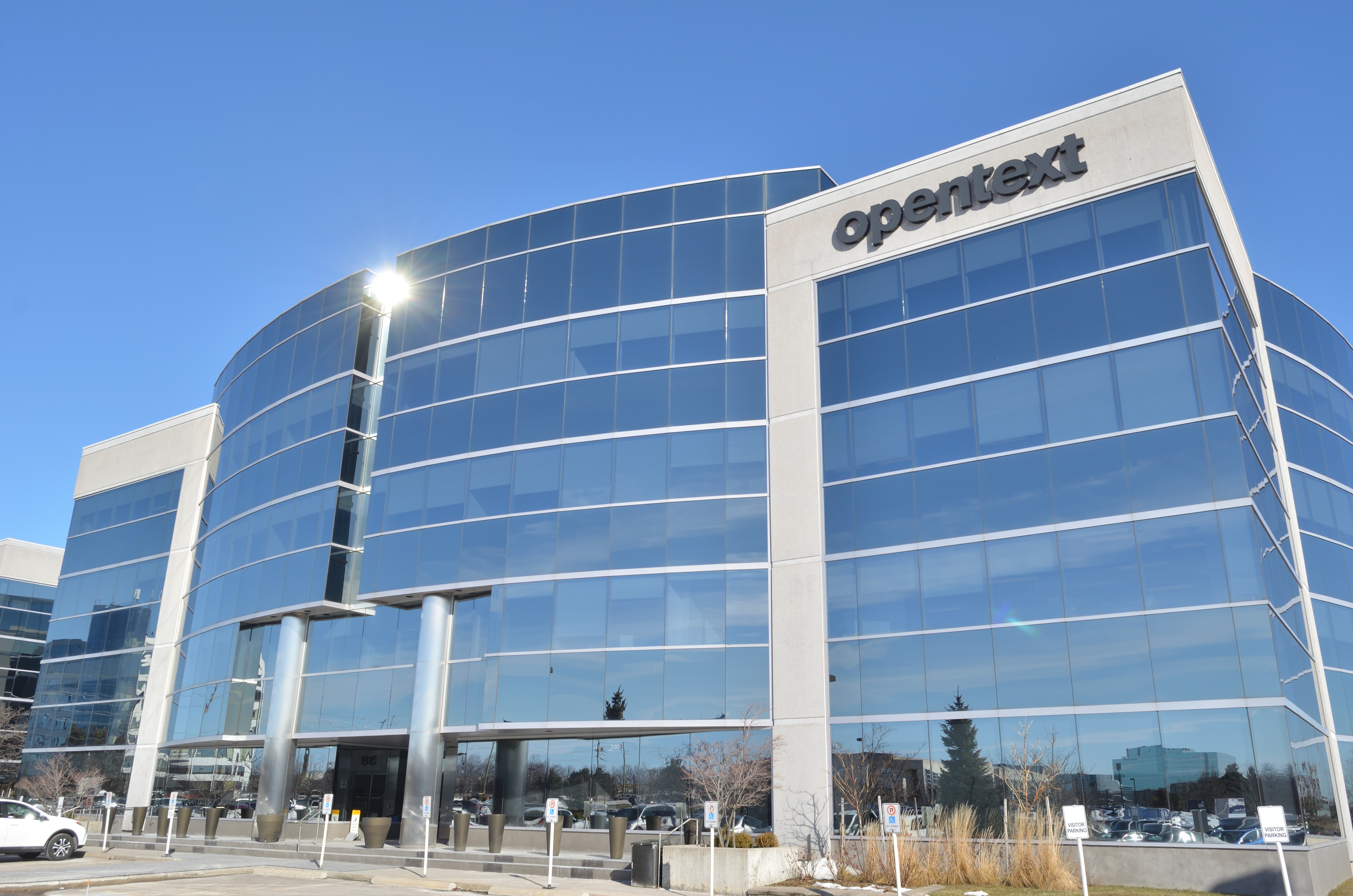
OpenText office in Richmond Hill, Ontario

OpenText's products include enterprise content management (OpenText Content Suite, OpenText Extended ECM, OpenText Documentum Content Management), Business Network, customer experience management (OpenText Customer Experience Platform), digital process automation (OpenText Process Automation), discovery (OpenText eDiscovery and Investigations), security (OpenText Forensic (EnCase), OpenText Carbonite and Webroot solutions, OpenText NetIQ, OpenText ArcSight, OpenText Voltage, OpenText Fortify), and AI and analytics (OpenText Magellan Product Suite).

OpenText announced cloud-native containerized versions of many of the company's software applications in April 2020.

=== Documentum ===
OpenText Documentum is a secure information management platform, named after the company Documentum that originally developed the software suite. In 2003, EMC acquired Documentum for $1.7 billion. In 2016, EMC was acquired by Dell, becoming Dell EMC. Subsequently, all of the Documentum intellectual property was sold to OpenText Corporation.

=== Content Suite Platform ===
In 1996, the product originally called "Livelink" became OpenText's. Between 2003 and 2005, "Livelink" evolved from being the name of a single product to being a brand applied to the names of several OpenText software products. As a result of this change, "Livelink Server" became known as "Livelink Enterprise Server" (LES) and later "Livelink ECM. In 2012, OpenText introduced the OpenText Content Suite. Then the technology component formerly known as Livelink ECM – Enterprise Server became known as OpenText Content Server, which is now a key component of OpenText Content Suite Platform.

=== Magellan ===
In July 2017, OpenText launched its artificial intelligence (AI) and analytics platform, OpenText Magellan, at the company's Enterprise World conference. The platform enabled consumers to use open-source software and algorithms, and for companies to build their own models.

=== RightFax ===
OpenText RightFax provides network-based fax functionality to enterprise organizations and has evolved through many versions since it was first released in 1992.

=== OpenText Intelligent Capture (formerly Captiva) ===
Captiva Software became a subsidiary of OpenText in 2017. It makes software for document information processing and data capture from paper and electronic documents and provides related services. Information in the form of extracted content and files is acquired in the Captiva Solution and then delivered for storage or workflow into document management systems such as those from Documentum, OpenText, Microsoft, or IBM. In 2019, Captiva was rebranded as OpenText Intelligent Capture.

=== OpenText AppEnhancer (formerly ApplicationXtender) ===
OpenText AppEnhancer is a content management system that manages, organizes, and stores information from an application or as an extension to an existing application. The product was acquired during OpenText's purchase of Dell EMC's ECD (Enterprise Content Division) in 2017.

=== OpenText Aviator ===
OpenText Aviator is a generative-AI solution. The product uses large language models (LLMs) and private data sets to solve industry-specific issues such as cybersecurity or DevOps through private business data management. OpenText Aviator includes business functions that provide a virtual agent for OpenText Service Management Automation X, software delivery optimization, and information retrieval in the workplace. The product also brings GenAI to Customer Communications Management and the company's supply chain platform.

=== Cloud Editions ===
Cloud Editions (CE) represents OpenText's flagship SaaS suite of solutions for enterprise information management, integrating content management, B2B network, cybersecurity, DevOps, and analytics in a cloud-native model. In November 2024, update 24.4 introduced new AI capabilities with the addition of over 100 AI agents to the platform. To demonstrate the value of the platform, the company released a program, "Earn Your Wings," that allowed organizations to test OpenText Aviator before completing a full deployment.

In April 2025, OpenText launched Titanium X, its strategic roadmap, through CE 25.2 to bring AI support to IT operations, cybersecurity, content services, application development, and customer communications.
