= Webroot =

Cybersecurity company

Webroot Inc.
- Type: Subsidiary
- Industry: Computer software
- Founded: July 5, 1997; 29 years ago
- Headquarters: Broomfield, Colorado, United States
- Products: Cybersecurity software
- Services: Computer security
- Parent: OpenText
- Website: www.webroot.com

Webroot Inc. is an American privately held cybersecurity software company that provides Internet security for consumers and businesses. Founded in Boulder, Colorado, the company is headquartered in Broomfield, Colorado, and has US operations in San Mateo and San Diego, and globally in Australia, Austria, Ireland, Japan and the United Kingdom.

== History ==
Webroot was founded on July 5, 1997 when Steven Thomas and his girlfriend Kristen Tally launched Webroot's first commercial product, a trace removal agent called Webroot Window Washer. Investors include venture capital firms such as Technology Crossover Ventures, Accel Partners and Mayfield.

In 2002, Webroot launched a spyware blocking and removal product called Webroot Spy Sweeper. Webroot entered the enterprise market in 2004 with the launch of Webroot Spy Sweeper Enterprise, which combined Spy Sweeper with technology that enables IT administrators to deploy antispyware protection across an entire network.

In 2005, Thomas and Talley sold most of their shares in the company to a group of California investors as part of a $108 million deal. The company introduced antivirus protection with the launch of Spy Sweeper with AntiVirus in 2006. In October 2007, Webroot AntiVirus with AntiSpyware and Desktop Firewall was released with added firewall protection feature.

In October 2008, Webroot launched its first consumer security suite, Webroot Internet Security Essentials, in the United States. The international release of the security suite followed in early 2009.

In August 2009, Webroot appointed a new president and CEO, former CEO of Wily Technology.

In May 2010 Webroot announced plans to open its international headquarters in Dublin, Ireland. In July 2010 Webroot Internet Security Complete 2011 was released, including antivirus and antispyware protection, firewall capabilities, online back-up, password management licensed from LastPass, protection against identity theft and credit card monitoring for US customers.

In September 2010 Webroot opened a regional office in Leidschendam, The Netherlands which is primarily aimed at distributing Webroot's enterprise security-as-a-service (SaaS) products to businesses.

Webroot Mobile Security for Android was launched on April 5, 2011 for smartphones and tablets, with a free basic version and a paid premium version. The app is designed to protect against viruses from apps, threats delivered via web browsing and against the threats created when mobile devices are lost. The SecureAnywhere products launched on October 4, 2011, and the mobile security offerings were expanded to include the iOS mobile operating system.

In October 2011 Webroot launched a new generation of their products, using Prevx cloud technology. This included three basic products for Windows (SecureAnywhere AntiVirus, Essentials and Complete 2012) and security for Android and iOS mobile devices. In February 2012 products for businesses were added.

In July 2014 Webroot announced its BrightCloud Security Services, a new portfolio of services for enterprise-class businesses, including integration for Next-Generation Firewalls and SIEMs.

In September 2017, Webroot appointed a new president and CEO, former CEO of Lancope Mike Potts.

On February 7, 2019 Carbonite, Inc. announced that it entered into a definitive agreement to acquire Webroot. On March 26, 2019, Carbonite closed its acquisition of Webroot, with a purchase price of $618.5 million in cash.

== Acquisitions and partnerships ==
In November 2007, Webroot acquired UK-based Email Systems (EMS) and announced itself as a provider in the security software-as-a-service (SaaS) market.

In December 2009, Webroot announced a partnership with virtual private network software provider AnchorFree. A version without advertisements of AnchorFree's VPN software with protection via Webroot's antivirus and antispyware software was produced.

In March 2010, Webroot announced the acquisition of Swedish corporate Internet security company, Email Systems Scandinavia (ESS).

In July 2010, Webroot acquired San Diego, California-based web content classification and security services provider, BrightCloud, adding its web reputation and content classification technology to existing products.

In November 2010, Webroot acquired UK cloud-based anti-malware company, Prevx.

In July 2011 a partnership was struck with global distribution firm Tech Data, making Webroot products available to Tech Data's network of 125,000 channel partners in 100 countries around the world.

In July 2013, Webroot and RSA Security formed a partnership to enhance both firms' real-time phishing detection.

In September 2016 Webroot acquired the assets of CyberFlow Analytics, a company applying data science to network anomaly detection.

In February 2019, Webroot announced it would be acquired by Carbonite. In March 2019, Carbonite confirmed the purchase.

In December 2019 Carbonite was acquired by OpenText.

== Reviews ==
AV-Comparatives gave nine vendors, including Webroot, its highest award in its July 2012 Anti-Phishing Test, in which Webroot took ninth place among 18 products tested for efficacy in blocking phishing websites. In AV-Comparatives's Performance Test for October 2012, Webroot had the best PCMark score, having the lightest impact out of 20 products tested on a Windows 7 64-bit machine.

Webroot had the worst results out of 20 products tested by AV-Comparatives in the September 2012 File Detection Test of Malicious Software, both in terms of malware detection rates and false alarms. Webroot detected less than 80 percent of viral samples, much worse than the 94.4 percent rate of the second-lowest detecting product. Webroot inappropriately flagged 210 clean files, raising as many false positives as the other 19 products tested combined. According to AV-comparatives, the "results and misses have been confirmed with several tests and also by the vendor."

PC Magazine has awarded Webroot SecureAnywhere 19 times with Editor's Choice and Security Product of the Year, its highest award given to security and software programs. In PC Magazine's test for 2013, Webroot was found by PC Magazine staff to have the best score in malware blocking tests, malware removal tests, speed of scans, and installation speed. In the 2014 test, PCMag found "Webroot's detection rate of 89 percent and overall malware cleanup score of 6.6 points are both tops among products tested using this same malware collection."

Gartner listed Webroot in its Visionary Quadrant in its 2014 assessment of Endpoint Protection Platforms.

In 2014, PassMark Software, a software and hardware performance benchmarking company, benchmarked Webroot SecureAnywhere Business Endpoint Protection and Webroot SecureAnywhere AntiVirus using 13 performance metrics. In both tests, Webroot products were found to outperform competitors in a variety of metrics, including scan times, CPU usage, and others, earning the highest overall score in both tests.

During November 2016's evaluation of mobile security products for Android AV-TEST has given Webroot's SecureAnywhere Mobile product a "Protection Score" of 3.5 out of 6, placing it near the bottom of all 26 products evaluated in this test in terms of protection against malware. Both the "Detection of the latest Android malware in real-time" and "Detection of the latest Android malware discovered in the last 4 weeks" scores were below the "Industry Average" score.

WebRoot's web browser extension will flag any web site that WebRoot has not reviewed as suspicious. The browser extension will inject an exclamation mark icon along with a warning into search engine results for all unreviewed sites, making it look like the warning is a product of the search engine being used. On February 22, 2017, in response to a customer complaint on WebRoot's community forum about this behavior, a WebRoot company representative replied, "...a site will automatically show as potentially suspicious if it hasn't garnered a large enough audience for our Team to review it." This has resulted in multiple false positive complaints in the WebRoot Community Fourm.

In October 2017, AV-Comparatives performed a "Head-to-Head Comparison" between products from VIPRE and Webroot, the Webroot SecureAnywhere product was only able to achieve 86.4% "Protection Rate", compared to VIPRE Cloud's 100% rate. The test was performed using a test set of 316 live malicious URLs found in the field.

During the January 2018 test of 84 various Android antimalware apps by AV-Comparatives, Webroot Security Premier has detected 99.7% of all antimalware samples, placing it below 30 other tested apps which showed better detection rates.

== See also ==
- AntiVirus
- Software as a Service
