= Prevx =

- Original author: Prevx
- Developer: Webroot Software
- Final release: 3.0
- Operating system: Microsoft Windows
- Type: Anti-malware
- License: Freemium
- Website: prevx.com

Prevx is a discontinued anti-malware utility. There are separate real-time and on-demand versions. It can remove low-risk adware for free, but the user has to purchase and enter a license key if it is more serious. Scanning can take anywhere from less than two minutes to five minutes.

== Reception ==
Tony Zaitoun, of About.com, liked the utility except that he had some confusion about configuring the interface and that key protection was disabled by default. The issue referenced has since been corrected.

== Awards ==
- Editors' Choice by PC Magazine
- Platinum & Standard Checkmark by West Coast Labs

== History ==
Prevx Limited was formed in March 2001 in the UK and registered under the name “Immunify”, changing its name to “TrustCorps” later that year and finally re-branded as “Prevx” in 2003. The founder team was led by Nick Ray as CEO and Paul Stubbs as COO.

Originally positioned as a Host Intrusion Prevention System, the company's initial software product was designed to protect UNIX / Linux servers from advanced malware threats without reliance on malware signatures, thus providing protection from unknown or “Zero-Day” threats. The software was positioned the last line of defence against threats that had bypassed or overcome firewall, network security and any installed anti-virus or other host-based protection systems.

This early product monitored the behaviour of executables in real-time and would block system calls that breached its rules, thus providing protection. It offered protection against buffer overflow attacks and could successfully detect rootkits that attempted to hide themselves in memory or on disk.

At the end of 2002, the company received investment from South East Growth Fund and in early 2003 from private investors through an angel network, Hotbed.

In 2003, the company rebranded to Prevx and in June 2004 launched its first product for the Windows platform, “Prevx Home - Beta”, offered as a freeware download. Prevx Home 1.0 (also free) followed in September 2004. Prevx Home 2.0 launched in October 2004 and incorporated functionality to report the security events it detected to a central database, operated by Prevx, which would allow Prevx to monitor new virus outbreaks and detect and block spyware. By the end of 2004, 6 months after launching, over 1m copies of Prevx had been downloaded. Subsequent versions included Prevx 3.0, Prevx Edge and Prevx CSI.

== Controversy ==
Prevx stirred up controversy amongst the internet communities when they announced on November 27, 2009 that a recent Windows update was causing a "Black Screen of Death", affecting users of Windows XP, Vista and 7. They claimed this bug rendered the machine unusable. It was later discovered that the black screen was caused by a malware infection (with Daonol), unrelated to the Windows update. Prevx then apologized for its earlier claims.

== Acquisition ==
In 2005, Prevx was acquired in an all share offer by Retento Limited, an investment vehicle owned by serial entrepreneur Mel Morris, who had joined the Prevx board in June 2003 and was an investor in Prevx introduced by Hotbed. Retento was subsequently renamed Prevx Group Limited.

In November 2010, Prevx was acquired by US-based Internet security company Webroot. The full conditions of the deal were not released but the announcement was made that Webroot will fully integrate Prevx's behaviour-based antivirus technology into their existing software and also make Mel Morris, founder and chief executive of Prevx Group, the vice president of Webroot's Prevx division. Webroot has since discontinued the Prevx product line although the technology and concepts continue to underpin Webroot products.
