= Institute of Practitioners in Advertising =

Trade body in the United Kingdom

- Abbreviation: IPA
- Formation: 1917
- Type: Trade association
- Purpose: Representation of UK advertising media and marketing communications agencies and professionals
- Location: 44 Belgrave Square, London SW1X 8QS
- Region served: United Kingdom
- Members: 258 agencies
- President: Karen Martin
- Director-general: Paul Bainsfair
- Website: IPA

The Institute of Practitioners in Advertising (IPA), incorporated by a Royal Charter, is the trade body and professional institute for agencies and individuals working in the UK's advertising, media and marketing communications industry.

== History ==
Founded in 1917 as the Association of British Advertising Agents, it was succeeded in 1927 by the Institute of Incorporated Practitioners in Advertising to secure further professional status and recognition for its members. In 1954, it changed to its current name, the Institute of Practitioners in Advertising, so that individuals as well as corporate bodies could be members.

The IPA was awarded a Royal Charter in December 2015. This came into effect officially when it was sealed on 13 April 2016. The Charter is displayed at the IPA's London office. As of April 2024, the IPA had 258 agency members.

== Role ==
IPA members account for over 85 per cent of the media spend in the UK. It covers all aspects of the agency business: creative, digital marketing, direct marketing, healthcare, media, out-of-home advertising, sales promotion and sponsorship sectors.

The IPA says its role is to advance the value, theory and practice of advertising, media and marketing communications; acting as a spokesman for the industry to promote best practice standards in these fields; and to ensure that the work it does will benefit the public, the wider business community and the national economy. It also runs several programmes to define, help and maintain the highest possible standards of professional practice in addition to providing core support and advisory services through its Legal and Insight departments.

This includes award schemes such as the IPA Effectiveness Awards, best practice guidelines, and surveys including the quarterly IPA Bellwether Report (compiled by S&P Global, and annual IPA Agency Census. The 2023 Census, for example, revealed that overall staff numbers within IPA agency membership increased marginally year-on-year to 26,630 people. The IPA also runs three flagship annual conferences to represent its core pillars, the IPA Talent & Diversity Conference in April, the IPA Business Growth Conference in July and the IPA Effectiveness Conference in October.

IPA members participate in the IPA's programme of continuing professional development. They have access to over 80 training courses, a variety of online and offline qualifications programmes and a full range of advisory services. It also offers professional accreditation to anyone who undertakes a minimum number of its qualifications.

The IPA is a member of the UK's Advertising Association. It is active in the creative industries' joint partnership with government under the Creative Industries Council umbrella.

== Organisation ==
The IPA is governed by a council of 42 elected members, a third of whom are up for re-election each year, and six ex officio members (the two most recent IPA Past Presidents, plus the IPA Chairs of the 44 Club, England & Wales, Northern Ireland and Scotland). Day-to-day, the IPA is led by its director-general, Paul Bainsfair, who succeeded Hamish Pringle in 2011.

Its president, who serves a two-year term, is currently (from March 2025) Karen Martin, CEO of BBH, who succeeded Group M's Josh Krichefski. On becoming IPA President, Martin launched an agenda to revitalise UK advertising, and celebrate the value creativity brings to business success, the economy and British culture.
