= Cilla Snowball =

English executive (born 1958)

Dame Cilla Snowball DBE
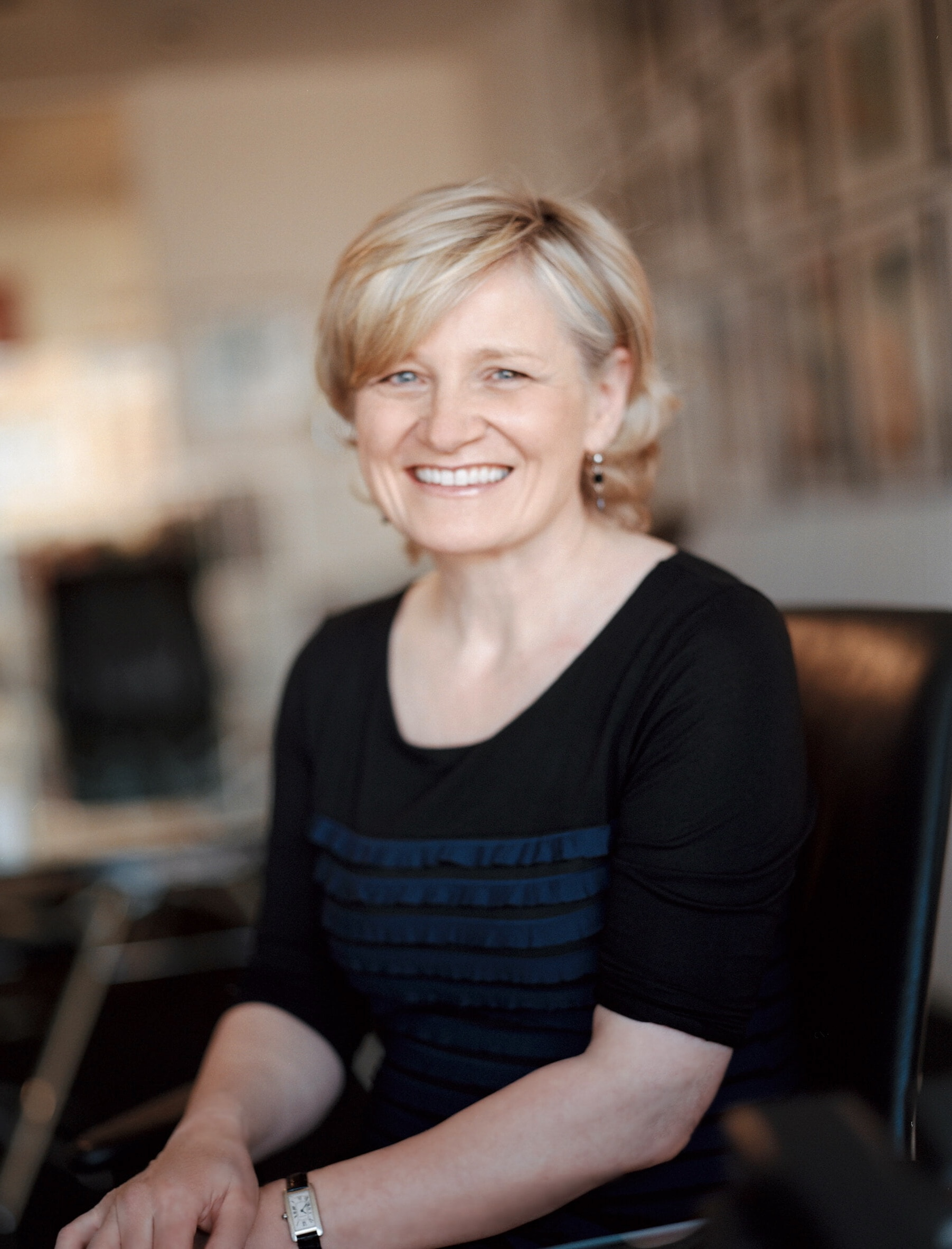
- Gordon & Eden Portrait of Cilla Snowball

Chief Executive Officer of Abbott Mead Vickers BBDO
- In office 2006–2018

Chair of The Advertising Association
- In office 2012–2015

Senior Governor of The Wellcome Trust
- Incumbent
- Assumed office 2016

Personal details
- Born: Priscilla Deborah Snowball; October 1958 (age 68) United Kingdom
- Education: University of Birmingham
- Occupation: CEO of BBDO, Senior Governor of The Wellcome Trust and Chairperson

Dame Priscilla Deborah Snowball, DBE, generally known as Cilla Snowball (born October 1958), is Group Chairman and Group Chief Executive Officer (CEO) of AMV BBDO, an advertising and communications group in the UK. She has worked for Abbott Mead Vickers for 20 years; in senior management positions since 2005, rising to agency head and now country head.

== Career ==
After graduating from the Birmingham University in 1981 (BA, French), she moved straight into the world of advertising where she joined Allen Brady Marsh. In 1983, she moved to Ogilvy and Mather before leaving for Abbott Mead Vickers nine years later. There she moved up in the company, taking first the post of Chief Executive, then chairman in 2004 and Group CEO and chairman in 2006.

On the board of BBDO Worldwide, Comic Relief and Birmingham University, she was appointed a CBE for services to advertising in 2009. She is Chairman of the Advertising Association.

== Other activities ==
=== Corporate boards ===
- Derwent London, Non-Executive Member of the Board of Directors (since 2015)
- RAC Limited, Non-Executive Member of the Board of Directors (since 2014)

=== Non-profit organisations ===
- Genome Research Limited (GRL), Member of the Board of Directors (since 2019)
- Wellcome Trust, Member of the Board of Governors (since 2019)
- Women's Business Council, Chair (since 2016)

== Recognition ==
In February 2013 Snowball was listed as one of the 100 most powerful women in the United Kingdom by Woman's Hour on BBC Radio 4. She was appointed Dame Commander of the Order of the British Empire (DBE) in the 2017 Birthday Honours for services to advertising, diversity, and equality.
