= Phanfare =

Phanfare was an online subscription-based photo sharing and video sharing service. It was introduced in November 2004 by Phanfare, Inc, a company founded by Andrew Erlichson and Mark Heinrich.

== Overview ==
Phanfare was targeted at prosumers and serious amateurs who desire archival photo and video sharing. Consumers could upload their digital photos and videos to Phanfare. Phanfare provided each customer with a destination URL where they could direct viewers. Phanfare integrated address book and invitation tools to allow the consumer to efficiently send out invitations to view albums. It backed up and held original fullsize images using Amazon S3, allowing the consumer to retrieve their original digital assets in the event that they lose their local copy. Phanfare was acquired by Carbonite on June 6, 2011.

== Uploading of photos and videos ==
Phanfare distributed a photo and video organizing program called Phanfare Photo (Windows and Mac compatible) that uploaded photos and video in the background while the consumer adds captions, edits and organizes the content. Phanfare could import JPEG, Adobe Photoshop PSD images as well as AVI, QuickTime, WMV and MPEG-2 movies. Phanfare also provided an Apple iPhone app, Phanfare Photon, for uploading and viewing photos and videos as well as plugins for major photo and video organizing programs. Phanfare has been noted by the Wall Street Journal for its novel approach to video sharing and its media retention policies. The ideas for cache-coherent synchronization of photos and videos to a local application cache can be traced back to work in Cache Coherence in shared memory Multiprocessing.

== History of Phanfare ==
First released in November 2004, Phanfare initially provided simple web hosting of photos and videos at short URLs in the Phanfare domain. Phanfare provided viewing and sharing without requiring that viewers register with Phanfare. Phanfare sites were optionally protected with site passwords. In January 2008, Phanfare introduced social networking features to the Phanfare system, de-emphasized the desktop clients, and began offering a freemium level of service (initially 1GB free, and later reduced to 256MB free) which lasted until 2009, as well as printed products including silver halide prints, digitally printed books and cards. On June 6, 2011, Carbonite acquired Phanfare. Carbonite declined to honor Phanfare lifetime memberships, instead granted lifetime members $299 in Phanfare credit which would expire after three years if unused. Two days later, Phanfare founder and CEO, Andrew Erlichson notified lifetime subscribers that customers requesting a refund will be paid not by Carbonite, but what remains of Phanfare, Inc. In May 2012, Erlichson left Carbonite exactly one year after the purchase. Carbonite shut down Phanfare on May 28, 2017.
