= Committee of Advertising Practice =

Advertising regulation authority in the United Kingdom

- Abbreviation: CAP
- Type: Non-governmental organisation
- Purpose: Advertising industry self-regulation policy creation
- Headquarters: Castle House, 37-45 Paul Street, Shoreditch, London
- Region served: United Kingdom
- Website: asa.org.uk

The Committee of Advertising Practice (CAP) is a British organisation responsible for the UK Code of Non-Broadcast Advertising, Sales Promotion and Direct Marketing, which is the main code of practice for self-regulation of the non-broadcast advertising industry in the UK.

It is the sister organisation of, and is administered by, the Advertising Standards Authority (ASA).

== Role and responsibilities ==
The CAP, alongside ASA, is primarily responsible for the constant revising and updating of the UK Code of Non-Broadcast Advertising, Direct Marketing, and Sales Promotion (CAP Code). CAP also provides training and advice for advertisers to help them understand the Code, including offering free advice to companies on whether their ad copy is likely to meet the Code requirements. Broadcast advertising is explicitly not within the remit of the CAP; instead, advertisements that are broadcast on television or radio are regulated by the Broadcast Committee of Advertising Practice and their separate standards. Industries under particular focus for CAP in terms of rules and guidelines for advertising include alcohol and gambling.

Though some of the advertising rules are legally enforceable, the majority are self-regulatory and based on the commitment of involved stakeholders following best practice. The committee has no statutory or common law powers in the UK; despite this fact, courts have found that CAP decisions are subject to the judicial review process, in the same way as they would be were it to be the case that CAP was a government body. The CAP Code is, however, not considered to be covered by competition law in the United Kingdom.

Whilst the committee itself is composed of members from advertisers and the media, its operations are overseen by the ASA's Governing Council, at least half of whose members are not linked to the advertising industry. This council is able to overturn the decisions that CAP makes, if it decides that it would be appropriate to do so.

== History ==
=== Foundation ===
Work on a voluntary code to regulate advertising in the UK began with the Advertising Association (AA) in 1960, following the advent of commercial television in the country, which was at the time an incredibly controversial concept. Amid the controversy, and fearing the potential for government regulation akin to that of the Federal Communications Commission in the United States, the AA created the committee in 1961, aiming to ensure that non-broadcast advertisements were "honest, decent, legal and truthful".

Over time, its role became more closely linked to government agencies. In 1988, the committee began to work more closely with the Office of Fair Trading, now part of the Competition and Markets Authority, following the passage of the Control of Misleading Advertisements Regulations of that year.

=== Decisions ===
In the mid-1990s, the committee deemed an advert for Brass Monkeys-branded underwear that "focused on the groin area" of a male model to be "unsuitable for public consumption". Critics claimed that the decision was sexist, saying that adverts of a similar or even more sexual nature featuring women had been allowed.

With email spam on the rise around the turn of the millennium, in 2003, the committee modified the CAP Code to require unsolicited email advertising to be easily identifiable, and to put restrictions on when it could be used at all. These restrictions were put in place around the same time as the Privacy and Electronic Communications (EC Directive) Regulations 2003, which similarly restricted the ability of email spammers to legally send junk mail.

In February 2008, CAP banned adverts for products with high fat, salt and sugar content on programmes that are specifically targeted at children between the ages of four and fifteen. Similar restrictions were imposed by the committee in December 2016, when CAP announced it had extended the broadcast ban on banning junk food ads to digital media, stopping the advertising of "high fat, salt or sugar food or drink products" in media where more than 25% of the audience was under 16. This covered print, cinema, and digital channels, including social media. Some criticised the decision as abrogating parental responsibility for what children consume.

As digital marketing became more and more significant, in March 2011, CAP extended the remit of the CAP Code to encompass a variety of different marketing tactics used online by companies, including the posting of content to their own websites. Prior to this change, the CAP Code had only applied to those adverts which were contained within paid advertising spots.

On 9 March 2017, the committee published new guidelines on working with online influencers, particularly on social media. These guidelines described the requirements for audiences to clearly see when material is an advertisement, even before clicking through to the content itself. However, the guidelines have been interpreted in different ways across different ASA enforcement decisions.

In December 2018, the committee issued new guidelines effective 14 June 2019, prohibiting the usage of gender stereotypes "likely to cause harm, or serious or widespread offence" in advertising. The decision followed an advertisement featuring a woman in a bikini and the tagline "Are you beach body ready?" for a company called Protein World, which prompted 378 separate complaints to the ASA. News reports claimed that a variety of advertisements that had previously aired would no longer be acceptable under the new rules.

== See also ==
- Broadcast Committee of Advertising Practice
