= Frank Tompa =

Canadian-American computer scientist

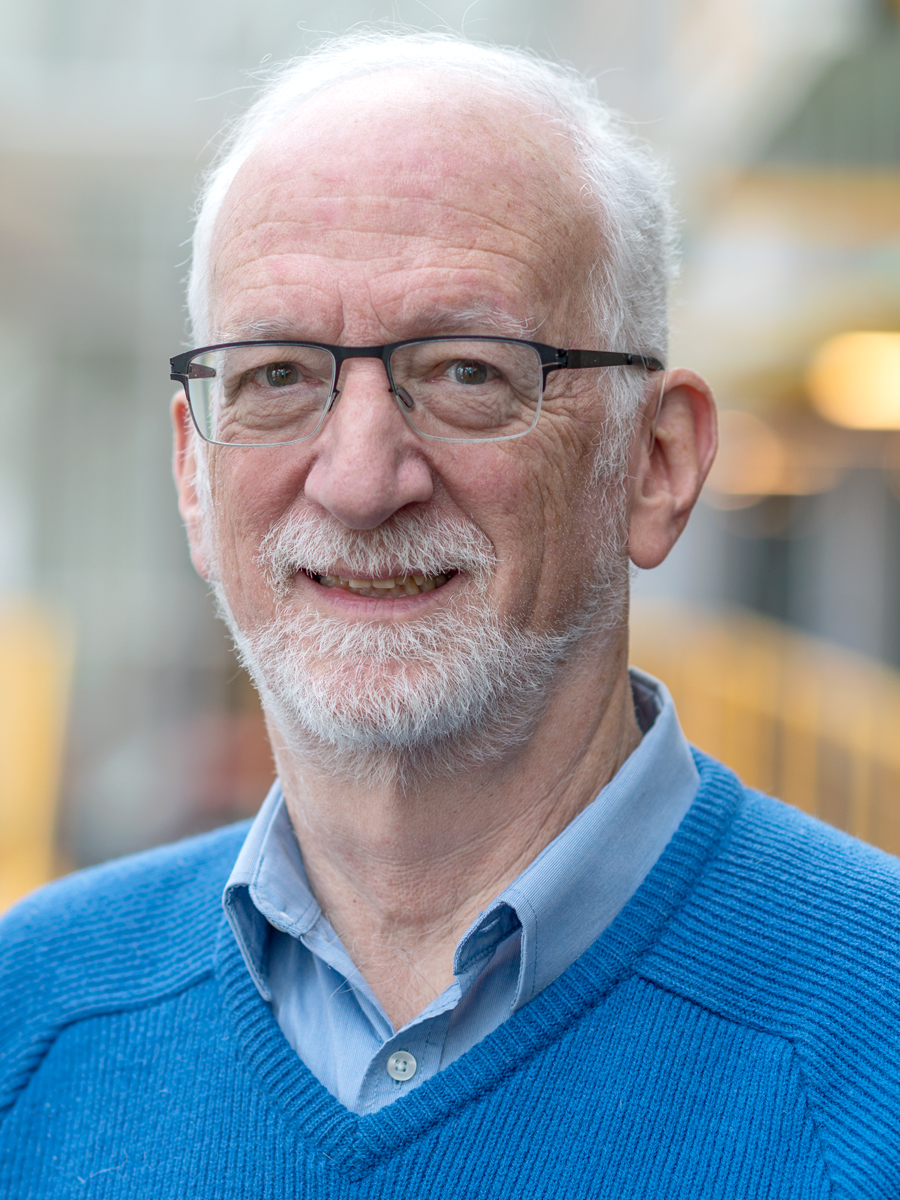
- Education: Brown University ScB and ScM (1970), University of Toronto Ph.D. (1974)
- Known for: Data Structures, Databases
- Spouse: Helen Tompa
- Awards: Honorary Degree, Dalhousie University, 2013; Queen Elizabeth II Diamond Jubilee Medal, 2012; Fellow, Association for Computing Machinery, 2010
- Scientific career
- Workplaces: University of Waterloo, University of Toronto, Bellcore, Stanford University, Microsoft Research, University of British Columbia
- Doctoral advisor: Calvin Gotlieb
- Website: cs.uwaterloo.ca/~fwtompa

Frank Tompa is a Canadian-American computer scientist.

He is best known for his contributions to the creation of an electronic version of the Oxford English Dictionary, work that was further commercialized in the founding of Open Text Corporation.

== Education and professional life ==
Tompa received his doctorate from the University of Toronto in 1974; since then, he has been a faculty member in Computer Science at the University of Waterloo. He served as Chair of the Computer Science Department for two terms, one in the 1990s and one in the 2000s.

In 2012 he was awarded the Queen Elizabeth II Diamond Jubilee Medal created "to honour Her Majesty for her service to this country... [and] to honour significant contributions and achievements by Canadians"; more specifically "in light of ... significant contributions to text data and design systems for maintaining large reference texts."

In 2010 he was named an ACM Fellow for his contributions to "text-dominated and semi-structured data management." In 2005, a street in the University of Waterloo's Research and Technology Park was named Frank Tompa Drive to recognize his contributions to both the City of Waterloo and the University of Waterloo.

== See also ==
- List of University of Waterloo people
