= Online marketplace =

Type of e-commerce site

An online marketplace (or online e-commerce marketplace) is a type of e-commerce website where product or service information is provided by multiple third parties. Online marketplaces are the primary type of multichannel ecommerce and can be a way to streamline the production process.

In an online marketplace, consumer transactions are processed by the marketplace operator and then delivered and fulfilled by the participating retailers or wholesalers. These types of websites allow users to register and sell single items to many items for a "post-selling" fee.

Because marketplaces aggregate products from a wide array of providers, the selection is wider, and availability is higher than in vendor-specific online retail stores. Some online marketplaces have a wide variety of general interest products that cater to almost all the needs of the consumers, others are consumer specific and cater to a particular segment.

== B2B online marketplaces ==
Business-to-business (B2B) online marketplaces are platforms that allow companies to buy and sell products or services to other businesses. These marketplaces typically focus on a specific product or service category and are used by businesses to find suppliers, negotiate prices, and manage logistics.

Some examples of B2B online marketplaces include VerticalNet, Commerce One, and Covisint, which were some of the earliest B2B marketplaces to emerge in the early days of e-commerce. More contemporary B2B marketplaces include EC21, Elance, and eBay Business, which focus on specific product or service categories and facilitate complex transactions such as requests for quotations (RFQs), requests for information (RFIs), and requests for proposals (RFPs).

== Online retailing ==
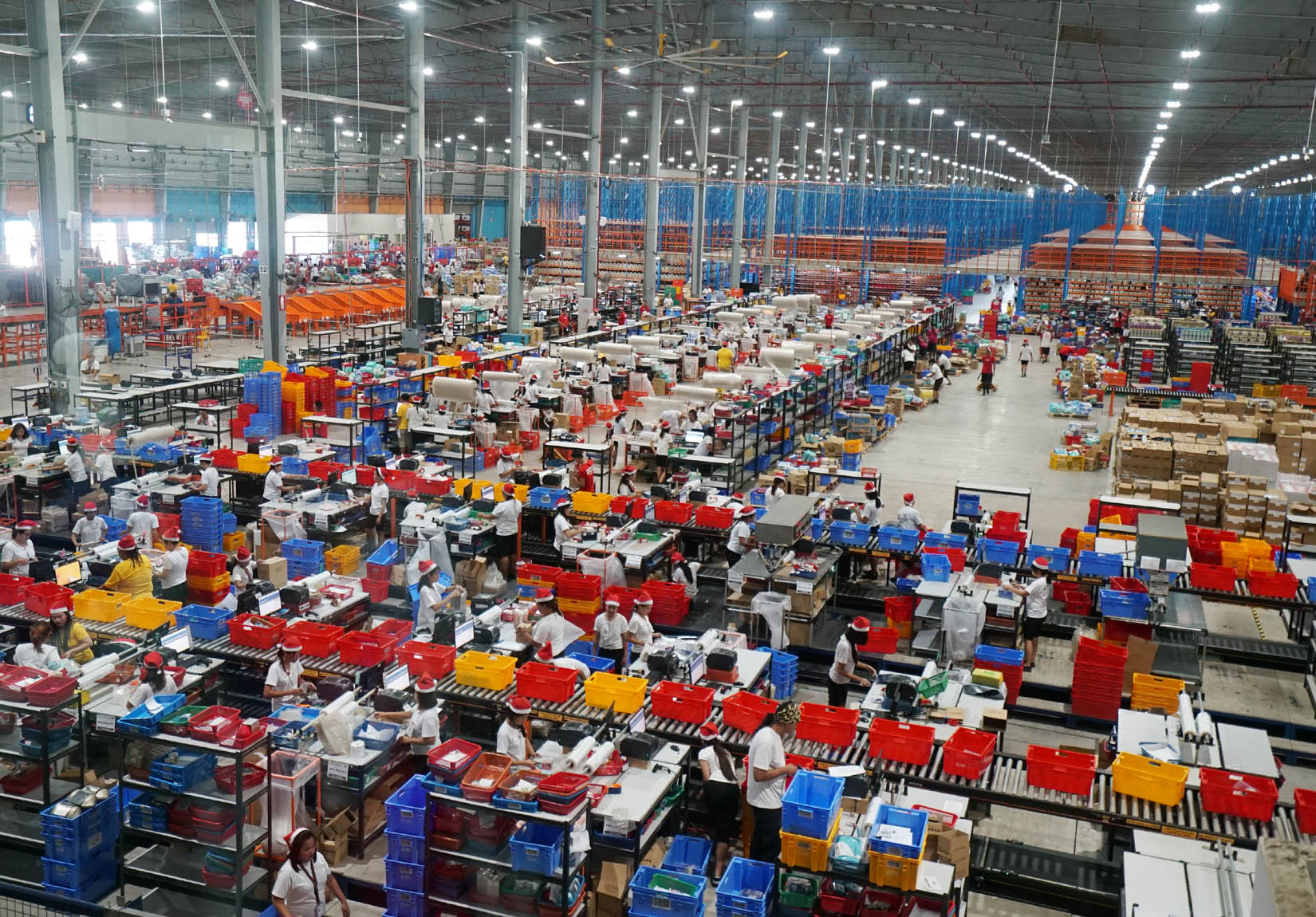
A Lazada warehouse in Cabuyao, Laguna, Philippines in 2018. Third-parties can ship inventory to customers from Lazada's warehouses and sell their products through Lazada's online marketplace.

Online marketplaces are information technology companies that act as intermediaries by connecting buyers and sellers. Examples of prevalent online marketplaces for retailing consumer goods and services are Amazon, Taobao and eBay. On the website of the online marketplace sellers can publish their product offering with a price and information about the product's features and qualities. Marketplace sellers often utilize a marketplace integrator or channel integration software to efficiently list and sell products across multiple online marketplaces. Potential customers can search and browse goods, compare price and quality, and then purchase the goods directly from the seller. The inventory is held by the sellers, not the company running the online marketplace. Online marketplaces are characterized by a low setup cost for sellers, because they do not have to run a retail store. While in the past Amazon Marketplace has served as a role model for online marketplaces, the expansion of the Alibaba Group into related businesses such as logistics, e-commerce payment systems and mobile commerce is now trailed by other marketplace operators such as Flipkart.

For consumers, online marketplaces reduce the search cost, but insufficient information on the quality of goods and an overloaded goods offering can make it more difficult for consumers to make purchasing decisions. Consumers' ability to make a purchasing decision is also hampered by the fact that an online marketplace only allows them to examine the quality of a product based on its description, a picture and customer reviews. Another characteristic of online marketplaces is that the same product can be offered by several merchants. In this case, consumers can often make the selection of a merchant with the support of reviews of that merchant, for example. Despite many conceivable factors influencing merchant selection, such as convenience, seller ratings, delivery options and a wider selection of goods, customers choose primarily on the basis of the lowest price for a particular product.

=== Peer-to-Peer (P2P) online marketplaces ===
Peer-to-peer (P2P) online marketplaces enable direct transactions between individuals, often facilitated by an intermediary platform that provides services such as payment processing, dispute resolution, and user verification. Unlike traditional e-commerce platforms that primarily follow a business-to-consumer (B2C) model, P2P marketplaces allow users to act as both buyers and sellers, fostering decentralized commerce

== For services and outsourcing ==
There are marketplaces for the online outsourcing of professional services like IT services, search engine optimization, marketing, and skilled crafts & trades work. Microlabor online marketplaces such as Upwork and Amazon Mechanical Turk allow freelancers to perform tasks which only require a computer and internet access. According to Amazon, its Mechanical Turk marketplace focuses on "human intelligence tasks" that are difficult to automate computationally. This includes content labelling and content moderation.

Microlabor online marketplaces allow workers globally, without a formal employment status, to perform digital piece work, such as classifying an image according to content moderation guidelines. Gig workers are paid for each task performed, for example US$0.01 for each moderated image. Gig workers accumulate payment on the microlabor platform.

== The sharing economy ==
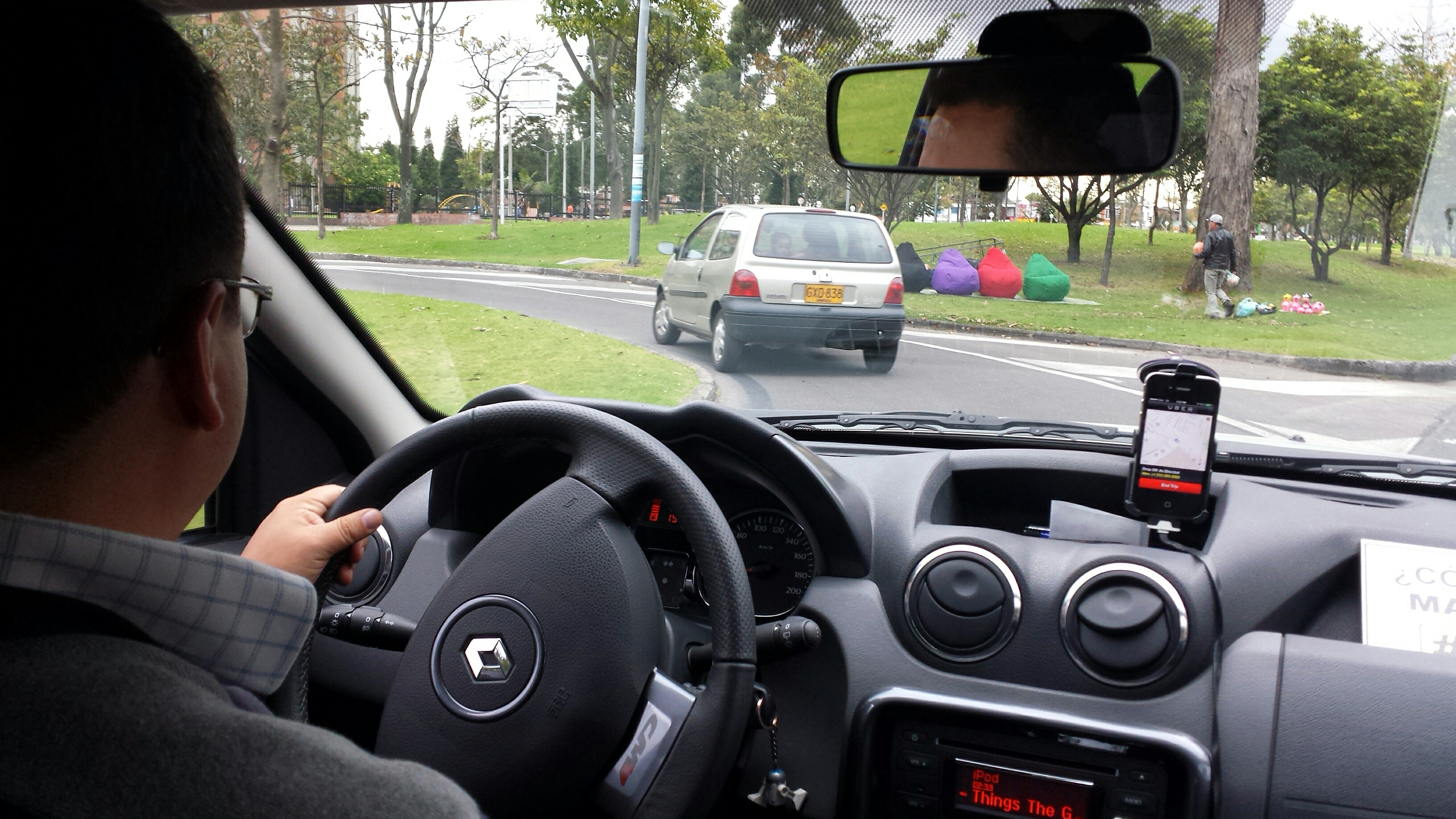
An Uber driver in Bogotá, Colombia with the Uber app on a dashboard-mounted smartphone

In 2004 Yochai Benkler noted that online platforms, alongside free software and wireless networks, allowed households to share idle or underused resources. As the sharing economy inspires itself largely from the open source philosophy, open source projects dedicated to launching a peer-to-peer marketplace include Cocorico and Sharetribe. In 2011 CouchSurfing was constituted as a for-profit corporation and by 2014 online marketplaces that consider themselves part of the sharing economy, such as Uber and Airbnb, organized in the trade association Peers.org.

== Criticism ==
A 2014 study of oDesk, an early global online marketplace for freelance contractors, found that the service outsourcing of microwork increased opportunities for freelancers regardless of their geographic location, but the financial gains for most contractors were limited as experience and skills did not translate into higher payment.

A general criticism is that the laws and regulations surrounding online marketplaces are quite underdeveloped. As a consequence, there is a discrepancy between the responsibility, accountability and liability of the marketplace and third parties. In recent years online marketplaces and platforms have faced much criticism for their lack of consumer protections.

== Market economy ==
In 1997 Yannis Bakos studied online marketplaces and came to regard them as a special type of electronic marketplaces. He argued that they reduce economic inefficiencies by lowering the cost of acquiring information about the sellers' products.

The operators of online marketplaces are able to adapt their business model because of the data they hold on the platform users. Online marketplace operators have a unique ability to obtain and use in their economic decision making personal data and transaction data, but also social data and location data. Therefore academics have described online marketplaces as a new economic actor, or even as a new type of market economy. In 2010 Christian Fuchs argued that online marketplaces operated informational capitalism. The inherent feedback loop allows the operators of online marketplaces to grow their effectiveness as economic intermediaries. In 2016 Nick Srnicek argued that online marketplaces give rise to platform capitalism.

In 2016 and 2018 respectively, Frank Pasquale and Shoshana Zuboff cautioned that the data collection of online marketplace operators result in surveillance capitalism.

== See also ==
- List of online marketplaces
- Darknet market
- Digital distribution
- Drop shipping
- Online shopping
