= The End of Business as Usual =

The End of Business as Usual: Rewire the Way You Work to Succeed in the Consumer Revolution
- Author: Brian Solis
- Language: English
- Subject: Business, Social media, Marketing
- Genre: Non-fiction
- Publisher: Wiley
- Publication date: October 18, 2011
- Publication place: United States
- Pages: 320

The End of Business as Usual: Rewire the Way You Work to Succeed in the Consumer Revolution is a bestselling book by digital analyst and author Brian Solis. The book examines how disruptive technology affects consumer behavior and how businesses need to either adapt or die. Katie Couric wrote the foreword.

== Synopsis ==
The End of Business as Usual explores how the relentless assault of technology, including social, mobile, and real time web, has changed the dynamic of business and consumer. Solis believes the 24-hour personal broadcasting of today's consumer has given rise to an "egosystem."

== Reception ==
Publishers Weekly named it a Top 10 Business Book for 2011. The book also made the 800-CEO-READ best seller list.
