= Broadcast Committee of Advertising Practice =

The Broadcast Committee of Advertising Practice (BCAP) is a regulatory body of the United Kingdom which has responsible for writing and reviewing the UK Code of Broadcast Advertising. It was established under the Communications Act 2003 and has responsibility to the Office of Communications (Ofcom). BCAP's remit is to ensure that advertising on radio and television in the United Kingdom are not misleading, that they do not cause harm or offence to viewers and listeners, and that they stay within the boundaries of taste and decency.

== See also ==
- Committee of Advertising Practice
