= Mozy =

Online backup service for Windows and macOS

- Type: Subsidiary
- Industry: Online Backup
- Founded: 2005; 21 years ago
- Headquarters: Seattle, Washington
- Products: MozyHome; MozyPro; MozyEnterprise
- Number of employees: 300 (2012)
- Parent: Carbonite
- Website: mozy.com

Mozy (/ˈmoʊzi/) was an online backup service for both Windows and macOS users. Linux support was made available in Q3, 2014. In 2007 Mozy was acquired by EMC, and in 2013 Mozy was included in the EMC Backup Recovery Systems division's product list. On September 7, 2016, Dell Inc. acquired EMC Corporation to form Dell Technologies, restructuring the original Dell Inc. as a subsidiary of Dell Technologies. On March 19, 2018, Carbonite acquired Mozy from Dell for $148.5 million in cash and in 2019 shut down the service, incorporating Mozy's clients into its own online backup service programs.

== History ==
Mozy (originally named Berkeley Data Systems) was created in 2005 by Josh Coates in American Fork, Utah, applying insights gained from his previous venture, Scale Eight. In October 2007, EMC acquired Berkeley Data Systems, along with the Mozy product line for $76 million.

Mozy was headquartered in Seattle, Washington, though the majority of its employees were in its Pleasant Grove, Utah, offices.

On September 7, 2016, Dell Inc. acquired EMC Corporation to form Dell Technologies, restructuring the original company as a subsidiary of Dell Technologies. On March 19, 2018, Dell sold Mozy to Carbonite in a $145.8 million cash deal. Carbonite announced plans to shut the service down as an independent entity in 2019, shifting Mozy's clients to its own online backup program.

== Products ==
Mozy published three editions: MozyHome, MozyPro, and MozyEnterprise.

MozyHome was the consumer edition of the Mozy backup service, offered as a monthly subscription or various other plans. In January 2012 Mozy opened the public beta of its cloud storage / synchronization feature called Mozy Stash, for free. MozyHome previously offered users an unlimited amount of storage space. In February 2011 they closed the unlimited service and began charging according to how much space was used.

MozyPro was the business edition of the Mozy backup service. Originally launched in 2007, MozyPro pricing was updated in 2012 for businesses to back up any number of computers for one price. For server backup, a business purchased the Server Pass for an additional monthly charge and backed up as many servers as they liked.

MozyEnterprise was for larger organizations and included support for Active Directory, user groups (in a company), and more administrator control over user rights. For Mozy administrators, the company detailed its keyless activation and pooled storage features in a 2013 EMC blog post. Mozy had more than 800 enterprise customers.

With all Mozy products, after the initial backup, Mozy only backed up new or changed portions of files. Backups could take place whenever the computer was not in use, either automatically or at scheduled times. All user data was encrypted locally with strong encryption prior to transfer via a 128-bit SSL connection. Users could choose a managed encryption key or a personal key for added security. Mozy's security did not let end-users shortcut the data deletion process. Mozy is both SSAE 16 Type 2 and ISO 27001 certified.

In May 2010, Mozy launched MozyHome 2.0 and MozyPro 2.0, adding support for local backup, increased performance and a new user interface for consumers and small businesses.

In December 2013, Mozy received the runner-up "Backup and Recovery/Archive Product of the Year" and "Cloud Storage Product of the Year" awards from SVC Awards, with Barracuda Message Archiver by Barracuda Networks and Cloud Disaster Recovery Service by EVault products in front.

Early in 2018, Mozy was acquired by their largest competitor, Carbonite Inc.

== Restore ==
In 2011, Mozy launched "restore manager" - a software tool to simplify the process of retrieving files from the Mozy cloud. It is also possible to restore through the Mozy client, in the Windows file tree, or by ordering an external drive from Mozy. Users can restore either the last version of any file backed up or any previous iteration backed up in the preceding thirty days or ninety days depending on the product.

== Reception ==
Mozy software was listed by many popular websites including FileHippo, FileHurry, and Softpedia. All have high user ratings and a good responses by users.

== See also ==
- EMC Corporation
- List of online backup services
- Comparison of online backup services
- Remote backup service
- List of backup software
