= Covisint =

American information technology company

- Type: Subsidiary
- Traded as: Nasdaq: COVS
- Industry: Information Technology
- Founded: 2000; 26 years ago
- Headquarters: Southfield, Michigan, U.S.
- Key people: Sam Inman (CEO)
- Number of employees: 180+ (2015)
- Parent: OpenText
- Website: www.covisint.com

Covisint was an American information technology company that was purchased by OpenText, a Canadian company for US$103 million in July, 2017. The OpenText Business Network mission is "Integrate, manage and securely exchange data across people, systems and things to gain an information advantage".

The roots of Covisint were in a program funded by General Motors to simplify supply chain led by Phil Abraham. General Motors was joined by Ford, and DaimlerChrysler to create a single B2B Supplier Exchange in 2000. They were also joined by Nissan, Renault and Peugeot as participants. In February 2004, Compuware Corporation acquired Covisint. Compuware completed a spin-off of Covisint on October 31, 2014. Covisint was fully independent of Compuware until its purchase by OpenText.

Initially focused in the automotive industry, they have expanded into the healthcare, oil and gas, government, and financial services. Covisint has offices in Southfield, San Francisco, Shanghai, Coventry and Frankfurt.
