= Advertising Standards Authority (United Kingdom) =

Advertising regulation authority in the United Kingdom

- Abbreviation: ASA
- Type: Self-regulatory organization
- Purpose: Advertising regulator
- Headquarters: Castle House, 37–45 Paul Street, Shoreditch, London
- Region served: United Kingdom
- Chair: Nicky Morgan
- Chief Executive: Guy Parker
- Main organ: ASA Council and Board
- Website: asa.org.uk

The Advertising Standards Authority (ASA) is the self-regulatory organisation of the advertising industry in the United Kingdom. The ASA is a non-statutory organisation and so cannot interpret or enforce legislation. However, its code of advertising practice broadly reflects legislation in many instances. The ASA is not funded by the British government, but by a levy on the advertising industry.

Its role is to "regulate the content of advertisements, sales promotions and direct marketing in the UK" by investigating "complaints made about ads, sales promotions or direct marketing", and deciding whether such advertising complies with its advertising standards codes. These codes stipulate that "before distributing or submitting a marketing communication for publication, marketers must hold documentary evidence to prove all claims, whether direct or implied, that are capable of objective substantiation" and that "no marketing communication should mislead, or be likely to mislead, by inaccuracy, ambiguity, exaggeration, omission or otherwise". The agency has also restricted ads featuring scantily clad women.

Guy Parker has been chief executive of the ASA since June 2009.

== History ==
In 1961 the Advertising Association established the Committee of Advertising Practice (CAP) to draft the British Code of Advertising Practice (the CAP Code). In 1962 the industry set up the Advertising Standards Authority (so named even though it is not a public authority in the usual sense) to adjudicate on complaints that advertisements had breached the new Code. The ASA operated under an independent chairman who was to have no vested interest within the industry.

Not long after the inception of the ASA the Molony Committee considered but rejected proposals to introduce a system to regulate the advertising industry by statute. The Committee reported that it was satisfied that the industry could be regulated effectively from within by the ASA. A guarded comment within the report, however, warned that the self-regulatory system depended upon the satisfactory working of the ASA and the maintaining of acceptable standards.

== Remit ==
=== Print media ===
Typically, advertisements that fall in paid-for spaces in newspapers (both national and regional) and magazines published in the UK fall within the ASA's remit. This category covers reciprocal arrangements not involving actual payments of money. Advertorials are also within the bodies remit as long as a reciprocal arrangement of some kind is in place and control over the content of the advertorial lies with the advertiser. If the editor of the publication maintains control over the advertorial, however, the piece is likely to be seen as editorial rather than advertising.

=== Broadcast media ===
In November 2004, control of the regulation of broadcast advertising, formerly undertaken by state bodies, was handed over to the ASA on a provisional two-year contract. Sponsorship credits are considered to be part of programming content and therefore fall outside the ASA's remit. Claims on shopping channels can generally be considered by the ASA, but complaints about non-delivery of items are unlikely to be taken up by the ASA unless there is evidence that the shopping channel has misled people or that the non-delivery is a widespread problem.

=== Direct marketing ===
Direct mailings, circulars, leaflets, unsolicited emails, brochures and catalogues are all typically within the ASA's remit. Items such as timetables and price lists are, however, usually outside its remit. Private correspondence, such as a doctor's letter or a bill, is also outside its remit, though a leaflet included with the private correspondence would be covered if it promotes a new or different product.

=== Internet ===
The ASA's remit has since March 2011 covered claims that appear on a company's own website, as well as covering claims that appear in paid-for spaces on the Internet, including pop up ads, banner ads and sponsored links. The non-geographical nature of the Internet can make it hard to determine whether the ASA's remit applies. Online sales promotions (see below) are within the ASA's remit as long as they appear in "British web space".

=== Sales promotions ===
The Institute of Sales Promotion (ISP), working to the same code as the ASA, can refer complaints to the ASA when it believes that there has been a breach of the rules on sales promotions rules. There has been no clear definition of what a sales promotion is for the purpose of the code, but examples include:

- Buy one, get one free (BOGOF) offers
- 25% extra free offers
- Discounted purchase offers
- Loyalty reward schemes, such as Air Miles
- Scratch cards, lotteries, prize draws.

Not all offers that give the consumer something free with a particular purchase may be considered sales promotion. For example, a mobile phone deal that offers a free Bluetooth headset may be considered as part of a package deal rather than a sales promotion.

=== Time limit ===
The ASA typically considered only advertisements that have appeared within the previous three months, although there are some exceptions to this rule, namely in cases where it was not possible for the complainant to know that the advertisement was misleading at the time it appeared, such as an advertisement for a long-term investment.

== Governance ==
The ASA is governed by its board of directors, appointed upon recommendation of an independent appointments committee. The ASA Council is appointed by the board.

== Funding ==
The Broadcast Advertising Standards Board of Finance (BASBOF) collects a voluntary levy on advertising costs, typically 0.1% on display advertising costs (e.g. 0.1% of the cost of placing a television advertisement). BASBOF passes the funds on to the ASA anonymously to ensure that the ASA are unaware of who has contributed to its funding. This avoids the question of money influencing the ASA's decision in its rulings.

== Complaints procedure ==
=== Data protection ===
The ASA needs the full name and address of the complainant to ensure that the complaint is legitimate. These details are never disclosed without the complainant's permission, in accordance with the Data Protection Act 1998. The only cases where the ASA might ask the complainant for their permission to be named relate to complaints that a consumer has not yet received goods or wishes to be removed from a marketer's database. Even in these cases the ASA can reveal details only with the express permission of the complainant.

If the complaint comes from a competitor or someone with a trade or vested interest with the advertiser about which they are complaining, the ASA requires the company to agree to be named. This, according to the ASA, limits the number of petty or retaliatory complaints. The ASA proceeds only with the express permission of the complainant for their organisation to be named.

=== Investigations ===
The ASA begins an investigation by contacting the advertiser for its views on the advertisement and, where appropriate, substantiation of claims made in it. The ASA may on occasion seek advice from industry experts on more complex issues.

Once the investigation is complete, a draft recommendation is sent to both the advertiser and the original complainant for any comments, with a request to keep this confidential until publication of the final report. The draft recommendation is then submitted to the independent Advertising Standards Authority Council, which adjudicates on ASA investigations. The ASA Council then discusses the complaint and the draft recommendation, and votes on whether to uphold the complaint or not. The adjudication in full is subsequently posted on the ASA's website, and made available to the press and the general public.

=== Appeals procedure ===
If there are grounds for an appeal against an adjudication, the case is reviewed by the Independent Reviewer.

A request for an independent review must be made within 21 days of the adjudication, and in writing direct to the independent reviewer, stating the grounds for appeal. Only the advertiser or the original complainant may request an appeal.

There are two grounds upon which an appeal can be lodged:

- Additional evidence (if it is the advertiser that has brought additional evidence to bear, it must explain why the evidence was not available during the investigation)
- Substantial flaw in either the ASA Council's adjudication or the investigation

The Independent Reviewer's decision as to whether or not to accept an appeal is final. Similarly, the ASA Council's adjudication on a reviewed case is also final.

== Sanctions ==
=== Bad publicity ===
The ASA publishes weekly adjudications on its website every Wednesday. For social media influencers who routinely fail to clearly disclose when they are advertising, the ASA can publish their details for up to three months and run its own targeted adverts on social media to make users aware of this.

=== Copy Advice ===
The ASA can order advertisers not to advertise unless the CAP Copy Advice team has seen the advertisement first and allowed the advertisement to go ahead. For example, the ASA told French Connection UK Ltd, which makes the FCUK branded clothing, to have all its advertisements pre-vetted by the CAP Copy Advice team.

=== CAP Compliance Team ===
The CAP Compliance Team is the enforcement arm of the ASA and CAP. The Compliance Team works to ensure that advertisers remove their problematic claims. The Compliance Team does not report back to complainants, nor does it publish the results of its work. However, part of its work does involve contacting media owners and telling them not to take any advertisements from problematic advertisers until the CAP Copy Advice team has pre-vetted the advertisements.

=== Trading Standards ===
The ASA can, as a last resort, refer advertisers to Trading Standards when they're unwilling or unable to follow its rules. Trading Standards officers have statutory powers to apply a wide range of sanctions, including prosecution or other legal action.

=== Ofcom ===
The ASA can also refer problematic broadcast advertisers to Ofcom, as well as video-on-demand providers and video-sharing platforms. Broadcasters have ultimate responsibility for advertisements shown on their channels and are therefore directly answerable to Ofcom, their licensing authority. Ofcom has powers to fine or revoke licences. For example, following more than 1,000 complaints to the ASA about the shopping channel Auction World.tv, the ASA referred the matter to Ofcom, which found the company in breach of its licence and fined it. Auction World.tv ended up in administration and went out of business.

== Noteworthy rulings ==
=== Apple Inc. ===
Apple has been involved in two major rulings by the ASA; its claim to be selling "the world's fastest personal computer" in 2004, its Power Mac G5 system, was judged to be unsubstantiated. The complaints against two other claims made in advertising for the product were not upheld. Later, in August 2008, an advertisement for the iPhone was banned because of false claims that it could access "all of the Internet"—due to its lack of support of major plug-ins such as Flash.

=== Atheist Bus Campaign ===
On 21 January 2009, the ASA ruled that an advert campaign, stating "There is probably no God", did not breach the code. Religious groups including Christian Voice had complained that the Atheist Bus Campaign broke the advertising code on the grounds of substantiation and truthfulness.

"The ASA council concluded that the ad was an expression of the advertiser's opinion and that the claims in it were not capable of objective substantiation," said the ASA. "Although the ASA acknowledges that the content of the ad would be at odds with the beliefs of many, it concluded that it was unlikely to mislead or to cause serious or widespread offence."

=== Zionist tourism advertisement ===
In July 2009, the ASA banned an Israeli tourism poster following complaints. Palestine Solidarity Campaign, Jews for Justice for Palestinians and 442 members of the public complained about how the map on the poster displayed the West Bank, Gaza Strip, and the Golan Heights as part of Israel. The Israeli tourism ministry responded to the criticism, saying the map was a "general, schematic tourism and travel information map" and was not meant to be a political statement.

=== L'Oréal ===
L'Oréal's claims in a mascara advertisement featuring actress Penélope Cruz "exaggerated the effect that could be achieved by using the mascara on natural lashes".

In 2011, two additional makeup ads for L'Oréal's were banned after British Liberal Democrat politician Jo Swinson lodged complaints about ads for foundation products made by L'Oréal-owned brands, Lancôme and Maybelline, featuring actress Julia Roberts and supermodel Christy Turlington. The 2011 complaints stated that L'Oréal ads were not representative of the results that the products can actually achieve. ASA confirmed that both ads were misleading, without the aid of before and after shots. It ruled that the two ads breached advertising standards code for exaggeration and for being misleading, and banned them from future publication.

=== Brennan JB7 music player ===
In March 2011, 3GA's advertisements for a digital jukebox known as the Brennan JB7, which can import content from CDs and cassette tapes, were found to be in violation of ASA guidelines for glorifying illegal acts, because it implied that it was acceptable to rip music, since "[it] repeatedly made reference to the benefits of the product being able to copy music but did not make clear that it was illegal to do so without the permission of the copyright owner". 3GA denied the claims, stating that the copies of music stored on the device were intended to improve accessibility, and are incidental copies without economical significance. Making private copies of audio CDs is illegal under United Kingdom copyright law.

In January 2013, 3GA was also found to be in non-compliance in another set of ads for the JB7 which promoted an optional dock for attaching an MP3 player such as an iPod. The ASA found that their advertisements did not make clear that the dock was not included with the JB7, and did not adequately mention that it is only compatible with older iPod models (such as the iPod Classic) formatted for use on Windows and could not be used with newer Apple devices such as the iPod Touch and iPhone.

=== TripAdvisor ===
In September 2011, the ASA launched a formal investigation into TripAdvisor after receiving a complaint submitted by online investigations company KwikChex and two hotels, that its claims to provide trustworthy and honest reviews from travellers are false. The ASA found that TripAdvisor "should not claim or imply that all its reviews were from real travellers, or were honest, real or trusted", and as a result of the investigation, TripAdvisor was ordered to remove the slogan "reviews you can trust" from its UK web site. It changed its hotel review section slogan to 'reviews from our community.'

No win No Fee Marketing

In 2025 the ASA upheld complaints against KP Law over ads for a data-breach group action service, finding that the ads did not clearly identify their commercial intent and omitted material information. The ruling formed part of a wider ASA review of ads for collective litigation claims in their use of "no win no fee" promises.

=== Other rulings ===
- In 2002, a campaign created by HHCL for Easynet's broadband services showed both male and female bosses punching their employees for wasting company money, and employees punching their bosses for slow internet speeds. It was ruled that these adverts could cause serious or widespread offence, and that they condoned violence and anti-social behaviour.
- In February 2012, the ASA ruled that the local Northampton furniture store Sofa King could not use a tagline stating that their prices were "Sofa King low" because it would be considered "likely to cause serious and widespread offense", due to its use of a pun based on a profanity. Sofa King's owner disputed these claims, saying that he had run print advertisements in a local newspaper containing the offending slogan for ten years without any complaints, and compared the situation to FCUK being banned from using their name in such a fashion.
- Nestlé's claim that it markets infant formula "ethically and responsibly" was found to be unsupported in the face of evidence provided by the campaigning group Baby Milk Action.
- In July 2018, the ASA ruled that Karamba Casino must remove an advert for the slot game Starburst titled "Tips and tricks on how to win at Starburst." The complaint filed stated the advertisement was "socially irresponsible" because it implied that strategies for a slot game could lead to a player making money. Four other complaints against online casinos were upheld by the ASA in 2017 against Ladbrokes, 888, Skybet, and Casumo because of adverts placed by affiliates.

== See also ==
- Advertising to children
- Clearcast, pre-approval for most British television advertising
- Ofcom, the British telecommunications and broadcasting regulator
- Press Complaints Commission
