= CAP Code =

Set of rules by the Committee of Advertising Practice

The UK Code of Non-broadcast Advertising, Sales Promotion and Direct Marketing (CAP Code) is the rule book for non-broadcast advertisements, sales promotions and direct marketing communications in the United Kingdom. It is written and maintained by the Committee of Advertising Practice (CAP) and administered by the Advertising Standards Authority (ASA). The 12th edition of the CAP Code came into force in September 2010.

The 12th version was released because the digital remit of the ASA was to be extended to cover online marketing communications, for example banner advertising, popup windows, pay-per-click campaigns, social media and online video. Website owners were given a 6-month period of grace to ensure that their websites and online marketing comply with the new CAP Code rules. The rules came into full force on 1 March 2011.

== Sections ==
There are 22 sections of the code and must be followed by all advertisers, agencies and media. The Code is enforced by the Advertising Standards Authority.

=== 01 Compliance ===
Rules relating to social responsibility; legality and fair competition. It also spells out that the ASA applies the Code in the spirit, as well as the letter.

=== 02 Recognition of marketing communications ===
Rules about making sure material is clearly identifiable as marketing communications / advertisements / advertorials.

=== 03 Misleading advertising ===
A key and extensive section of the Code, containing rules such as substantiation (evidence to prove claims); pricing; the use of the word ‘free’; availability of products, comparisons, testimonials and more.

=== 04 Harm and offence ===
Rules to ensure that ads do not cause harm or serious or widespread offence. Includes rules relating to shock tactics, unsafe practices and photosensitive epilepsy.

=== 05 Children ===
Rules that must be followed if directing ads at children or featuring them. Includes rules about unsafe practices and unfair pressure; pester power and sales promotions for children.

=== 06 Privacy ===
Rules about depicting members of the public; referring to people with a public profile; implying endorsement and the Royal Family.

=== 07 Political advertisements ===
Clarification of when the Code applies to political advertisements.

=== 08 Promotional marketing ===
An important section about promotions (e.g. competitions, prize draws, instant wins, front page flashes, charity promotions etc.) and incentive schemes. The rules cover the administration of the promotion, as well as the publicity.

=== 09 Distance selling ===
Rules governing marketing communications that allow readers to place orders without face-to-face contact with the seller. Covers cancellation; fulfilment of orders and refunds.

=== 10 Database practice ===
A crucial section for anyone doing direct marketing and collecting or using customer information. Covers consent (opt in and opt out), retention of information and suppression requests.

=== 11 Environmental claims ===
Rules about making ‘green’ claims for products or services. Rules cover evidence, the clarity of claims and ‘life cycle’ of products.

=== 12 Medicines, medical devices, health-related products and beauty products ===
A high level of scrutiny is applied to marketing communications for such products or treatments. These rules cover evidence levels (very high levels needed for medicinal claims); suitable qualifications for those claiming to treat; medicines rules; herbal and homeopathic product rules; cosmetics and hair growth / loss.

=== 13 Weight control and slimming ===
Rules for ads for weight control, slimming foodstuffs and aids, including exercise; diets, clinics and medicines. Rules cover the targeting of ads as well as the content.

=== 14 Financial products ===
Rules for financial marketing communications that are not regulated by the FCA or Trading Standards.

=== 15 Food, food supplements and associated health or nutrition claims ===
Rules relating to health and nutrition claims in foodstuffs; claims for vitamins and minerals; infant and follow on formula and food and soft drinks marketing to children.

=== 16 Gambling ===
Social responsibility rules for gambling and spread betting. The rules cover content and targeting are designed to protect under 18s and the vulnerable.

=== 17 Lotteries ===
Social responsibility rules that apply to lotteries (including The National Lottery; Gambling Commission licensed lotteries and locally registered lotteries)

=== 18 Alcohol ===
Social responsibility rules for alcoholic drinks. The rules cover content and targeting are designed to protect under 18s and the wider population.

=== 19 Motoring ===
Social responsibility rules for motor vehicles, covering safety, speed and irresponsible or anti-social driving behaviours.

=== 20 Employment, homework schemes and business opportunities ===
Rules that require clarity of the nature of employment and business opportunities, including display of earnings and any commitments required from consumers. Section covers employment agencies, homework schemes, business opportunities, vocational training and instruction courses.

=== 21 Tobacco, rolling papers and filters ===
Rules to prevent promotion of smoking via ads for non-tobacco products.

=== 22 Electronic cigarettes ===
Rules that apply to the marketing communications for electronic cigarettes and related products.

=== Additional information ===
- Preface: Information about the industry committee (CAP) that writes the Code and why they are committed to high standards in marketing communications.
- Scope of the Code: What the Code does – and does not – apply to. How the ASA assesses ads, including targeting and audience.
- How the system works: A full description of how advertising regulation works and the role of the Advertising Standards Authority, CAP and its funders. Information on the Independent Review procedure (of ASA adjudications.)
- History of self-regulation: Details of how advertising self-regulation developed from the 1880s to today.

There are three appendixes

- Appendix 1 - The CPRs and BPRs: This section explains the law on misleading and unfair marketing communications. This law is reflected within the Code and the ASA has regard to the law when considering misleading, aggressive or unfair marketing communications.
- Appendix 2 - Advertising rules for on-demand services regulated by statute: Rules relevant to advertising carried on video on-demand services regulated by Ofcom.
- Appendix 3 - Online behavioural advertising: Rules relevant to Online Behavioural Advertising.
