= Mulberry Academy Woodside =

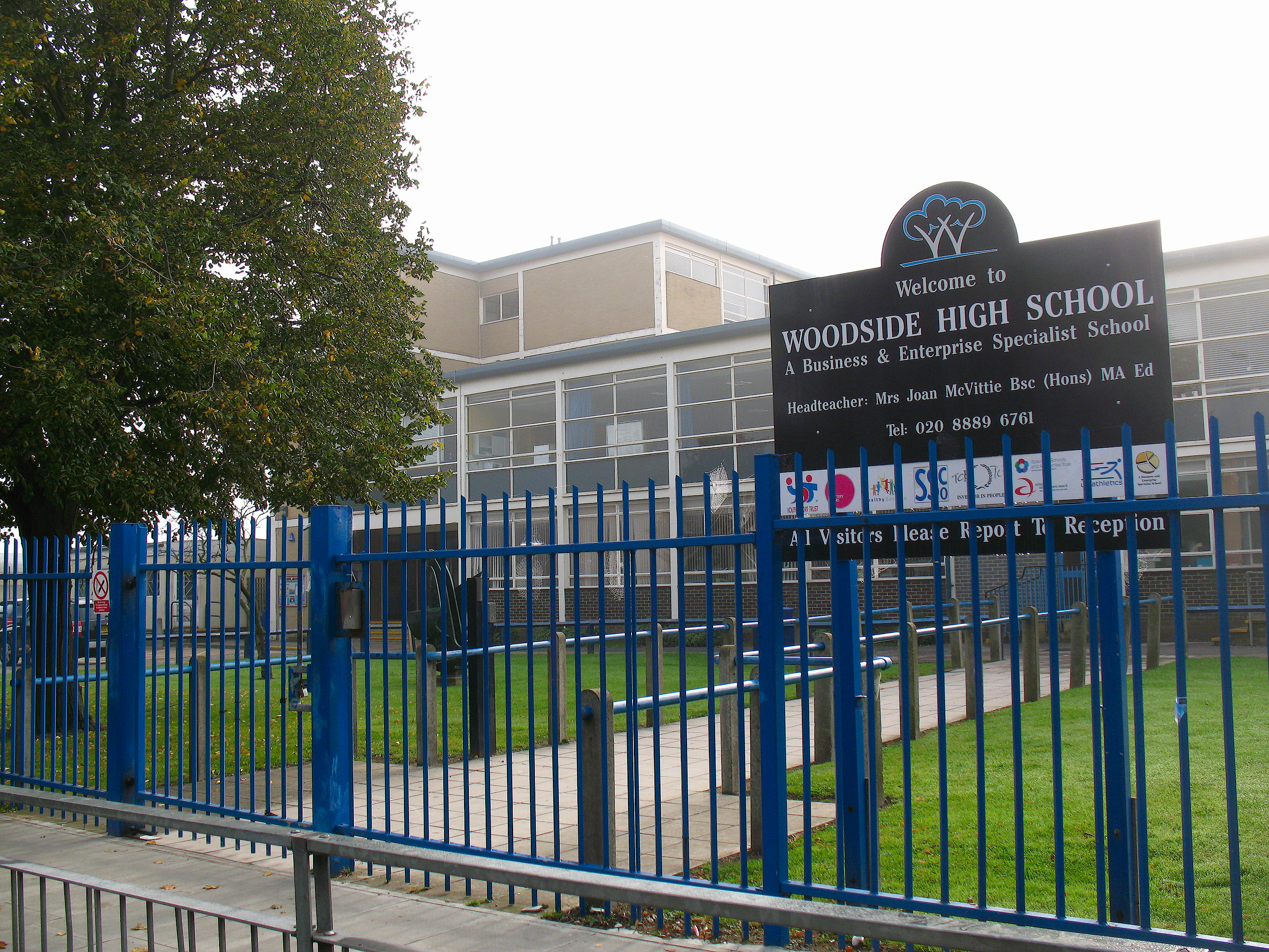

Location
- White Hart Lane; Wood Green, London, N22 5QJ; England; 51°36′13″N 0°06′03″W

Information
- Type: Academy
- Established: Earliest predecessor: 1884
- Department for Education URN: 137745 Tables
- Ofsted: Reports
- Head teacher: Angela Wallace
- Gender: Coeducational
- Age: 11 to 16
- Enrolment: c. 900
- Website: https://www.mulberrywoodside.org/

Mulberry Academy Woodside is a mixed 11–16 academy located in the Wood Green area of the London Borough of Haringey, England. With a student roll of 1200, the school has been judged by Ofsted as outstanding for two consecutive inspections (2011 and 2014).

In September 2006, the school was renamed from 'White Hart Lane secondary school' to 'Woodside High School'. Having had a chequered reputation, its head teacher Joan McVittie decided to give the school a make-over, with new uniforms and a new reputation. The school was built in 1962.

== History ==
The history of Woodside High School can be traced back through a number of renamings and mergers since its first predecessor schools were founded in 1884. In 1884 separate boys' and girls' Higher Grade schools were founded in Wood Green but by 1898 had become overcrowded and in 1899 merged when they both moved into a new building in Bounds Green Road. Wood Green Higher Grade school, as it was called, was taken over by the Middlesex education committee in 1921, closed and then reopened as Trinity county grammar school. Technical education, started in 1892 under the Technical Instruction Act 1889, developed quickly after the opening of Tottenham Polytechnic in 1897.

Wood Green county school was established by Middlesex County Council in Glendale Avenue as a mixed grammar school in 1910 and was later renamed Glendale county school. It amalgamated with Trinity county grammar to form Wood Green Grammar school in 1962 and then moved to White Hart Lane, leaving the Glendale Avenue site for Woodside school whilst Trinity county grammar's premises were taken over by the newly established Parkwood school. St. Thomas More upper school took over the Glendale Avenue site in 1967 and at the same time Wood Green Grammar became Wood Green comprehensive school. The new Wood Green comprehensive school also absorbed boys from Woodside school and some girls from Parkwood school.

In Tottenham in 1901, Tottenham County School was founded at Grove House in anticipation of the Education Act 1902. It was the first school that offered an alternative to the Tottenham Grammar School in the area and was also the first co-educational school of its kind in Middlesex. It originally shared Grove House with Tottenham polytechnic but in 1913 moved into a new building on the Green. Like Tottenham high school for girls, established in 1885, it was modelled on the grammar school and these three schools along with the Roman Catholic St. Ignatius's college, provided for Tottenham's educational needs. Tottenham County School in 1963 moved to new buildings at Selby Road, Devonshire Hill, next to the playing fields. In 1967, Tottenham county school premises were taken over by Tottenham school and by 1972 a sixth-form centre and a sports hall had been added.

In 1983 Tottenham School vacated the site when it merged with Wood Green comprehensive school and became White Hart Lane School, the premises on Selby Road later becoming the Selby Centre. In 2006 the school once again changed its name, becoming Woodside High School; Woodside High School closed as such on 30 November 2011, becoming an academy, Mulberry Academy Woodside.

== Location and buildings ==
The school is located on White Hart Lane in Wood Green, in the London Borough of Haringey, North London. It is central to many sport facilities such as a football ground and tennis court opposite the building, New River sport centre and a rugby field for London Scholars rugby league are also nearby. The school is approximately a 20-minute walk from Wood Green Shopping Centre

== Redevelopments ==
Over the past few years, the school has spent approximately 650 million pounds on refurbishment and rebuilding works, providing new buildings and technology. A new school for children with disabilities was built on site with Woodside and was named Riverside School.

== Specialist and academy status ==
The school was given specialist status in Business and Enterprise in September 2004. The school converted to academy status as Mulberry Academy Woodside in December 2011.

== Ofsted reports ==
The Ofsted Inspections in 2011 and 2014 both rated the school as outstanding. In recent years the school's reports have increased dramatically. The most recent inspection, on 23 Feb 2022 rated the school as good.

== Notable former pupils ==
=== Wood Green County School ===
- Stanley Owen Green (1915–1993), known as the Protein Man, a human billboard who became a well-known figure in central London in the latter half of the 20th century

=== Glendale County School ===
- Sir William Connor, journalist who wrote under the name Cassandra
- Prof Sidney William Wooldridge CBE FRS FGS, the first Professor of Geography at King's College London (KCL) in 1944

=== Wood Green Grammar School ===
- Trevor Phillips OBE (born 31 December 1953), writer, broadcaster and former politician

=== Trinity County Grammar School ===
- Elaine Delmar, singer
- John Donald Garner, diplomat
- Jack Good (producer), who produced Six-Five Special and played with Lord Rockingham's XI on their 1958 No.1 hit Hoots Mon (There's a moose loose aboot this hoose!)
- James Grout, actor
- Sir Ernest Harrison OBE, former Chief Executive of Racal, largely responsible for creating Vodafone
- Jack Hawkins CBE (1910–1973), actor who worked on stage and in film from the 1930s until the 1970s
- Kenneth Wilkinson, audio engineer for Decca Records

=== Tottenham County School ===
- Maj Alfred Cecil Herring VC (1888–1966), recipient of the Victoria Cross
- Cyril Hogarth (1924–2006), physicist
- Lancelot Thomas Hogben FRS, (1895–1975), experimental zoologist and medical statistician
- John Henry Marks FRCGP (born 30 May 1925) – the Chairman of the British Medical Association from 1984 to 1990
- Julia McKenzie, actress
- Roy Perry, Conservative MEP from 1994 to 1999 for Wight and Hampshire South (European Parliament constituency)
- Prof Ralph Raphael CBE FRS FRSE, organic chemist and academic
- Sir Norman Rowntree FICE, President from 1975 to 1976 of the Institution of Civil Engineers
- Joseph Ivor Silk FRS (born 3 December 1942), former Savilian Chair of Astronomy at the University of Oxford

=== White Hart Lane Secondary School ===
- Ali Jawad, paralympic medalist and former professional powerlifter
