= I Wear Your Shirt =

Advertising company

- Industry: Advertising
- Founded: 2008
- Founder: Jason Sadler
- Defunct: May 6, 2013
- Headquarters: Jacksonville, Florida, United States
- Website: Official website

I Wear Your Shirt was an American advertising company that used T-shirts to advertise businesses. From January 1, 2009, I Wear Your Shirt allowed a company to buy a day in which Jason Sadler, the founder, wore a shirt adorned with the company's logo. Sadler wore different shirts for every day of the year. He advertised for the companies by taking pictures and by uploading videos about the companies to Ustream and YouTube. The company closed in 2013.

== History ==
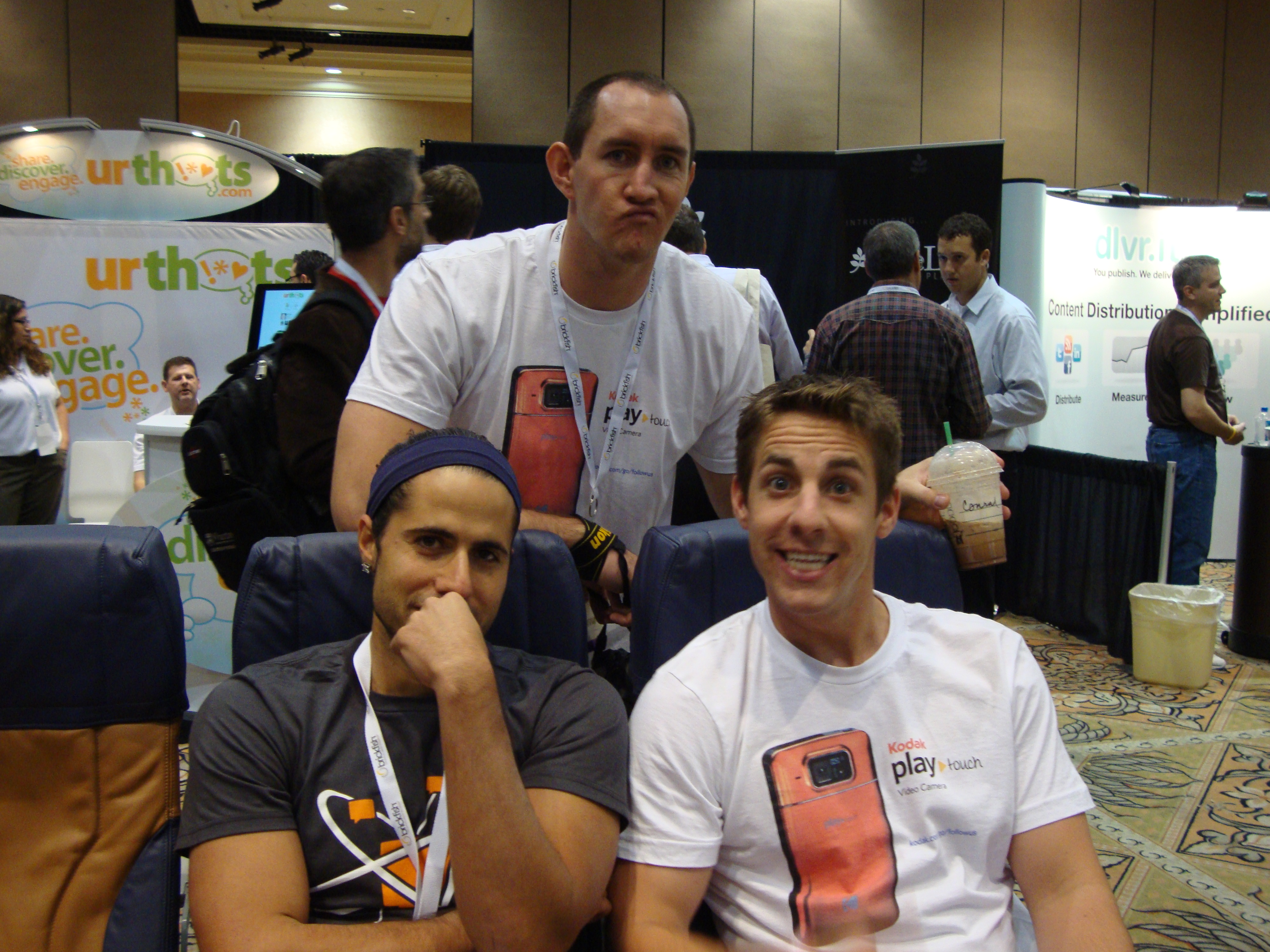
Founder Jason Sadler (in the back), AJ Leon (bottom row left), and Evan White (bottom row right)

I Wear Your Shirt was founded by Jason Sadler of Ponte Vedra Beach, Florida in 2008. He began wearing shirts for companies on January 1, 2009. Sadler decided to start I Wear Your Shirt after trying to come up with "a way to make some extra money without actually 'working'". In 2005, Sadler was inspired by The Million Dollar Homepage to create "something ... that would hopefully be as successful and, maybe down the road, just as profitable". He noticed that for promotional purposes, many companies gave away T-shirts for free. Knowing that T-shirts caught people's attention, he decided to become a "human billboard" and "create an advertising medium through free social media tools". After coming up with this idea, Sadler spread I Wear Your Shirt's services through his group of family and friends and through Facebook.

== Marketing and profits ==
For every day of the year, Sadler donned the shirt of a different company for a set price. On January 1, the price was $1. In 2009, the price was increased by $1 for every day after January 1, and by December 31, I Wear Your Shirt's last customer for the year would have to pay $365. At the end of 365 days, Sadler's income would be $66,795. He received an additional $18,000 in 2009 from the sale of monthly $1,500 sponsorships. After factoring in the money gained from contests and other enterprises, Sadler's total income in 2009 was $83,000. Sadler also advertised the company owning the rights to his shirt by posting videos of himself wearing the company's shirt on Ustream, YouTube, Facebook and Twitter, in which he discussed the companies he was promoting. In 2009, he had over 1,300 friends on Facebook and about 21,000 followers on Twitter.

For 2010, Sadler increased by twofold the cost of the shirts. He employed Evan White from Los Angeles, California, to wear the same shirts on the West Coast of the United States. In October of that year the duo were hired to promote the launch of the Nissan Juke in the United States. By January 1, 2011, there were five people across the country wearing the same shirt: Jason in Jacksonville, DeAndre Upshaw in Dallas, Texas, Angela Seales in New York City, Neal Brooks in Springfield, Missouri, and Amber Plaster in Las Vegas.

According to Sadler, the company had some 1,500 clients, including Nissan and Starbucks, and increased the daily price, so that it no longer matched the day of the year.

I Wear Your Shirt closed on May 6, 2013.
