= Forehead advertising =

Advertising using a person's forehead

Forehead advertising is a type of nontraditional advertising that involves using a person's forehead as advertising space.

== History ==
The Wall Street Journal ran a piece about James Carver and his London Creative Agency, Cunning, in February 2003. In the piece James was credited with inventing a new type of advertising. He called it ForeheADS. This preceded other companies that jumped on the bandwagon.

The origin of forehead advertising cannot be attributed to Justin Kapust and Nathan Allen. These former Johnson & Wales University students launched a Providence-based start-up, Headvertise, in late 2003. At its start, employees of Headvertise could earn up to $150 per week for wearing a temporary logo tattoo on their forehead. It was last reported that 64 students had featured ads on their foreheads for companies such as Roommates.com. According to a forum post by Kapust on YoungEntrepreneur.com, the company is now defunct.

In 2004, Toyota used forehead advertising as a guerilla marketing tactic to sell the newly launched Scion tC. Forty young adults were paid $11 per hour to wear temporary tattoos on their foreheads. The advertising message included a combination of the Scion brand name, tC model name, and asking price of $16,465. This event took place in Times Square, lasted for three hours in order, and was meant to expose adults between the ages of 30 and 40 to the car promotion campaign. This was a part of Cunning advertising agency's attempt to increase awareness for Toyota through non-traditional advertising techniques only. This London-based advertising agency also used forehead advertising in London, Leeds, Glasgow, and Cardiff in 2005 to promote CNX, a European youth TV channel.

Forehead advertising made headlines in January and February 2005 when a 20-year-old man named Andrew Fischer auctioned his forehead for advertising space on eBay. The winning company, SnoreStop, bid $37,375 for Fischer to display the company's logo via temporary tattoo on his forehead for 30 days. After this auction, Fischer became known internationally as the "Forehead Guy".

In June 2005, forehead advertising moved beyond temporary tattoos. Kari Smith auctioned her forehead for advertising space on eBay for an asking price of $10,000. Bidding reached $999.99 before GoldenPalace.com, a Canadian Internet gambling company, bid $10,000 for Smith to permanently tattoo "GoldenPalace.com" on her forehead. GoldenPalace.com has also advertised its logo via temporary and permanent tattoos on the backs of boxers, bellies of pregnant women, women's legs, and the chest of a swimsuit model.

In August 2005, a Miami-based start-up, Lease Your Body, was launched by Alex Fisher. Lease Your Body allowed advertisers to meet people willing to rent out space on their bodies, including necks, upper arms, forearms, hands, stomachs, lower backs, and foreheads, for temporary tattoo placement.

Most recently, forehead advertising has moved beyond the forehead and onto the entire skull. In 2009, Terry Gardner of California shaved her head to display a temporary tattoo for Air New Zealand on the back of her head. The company called these ads "cranial billboards."

== See also ==
- Human billboard
