= Stanley Green =

English human billboard (1915–1993)

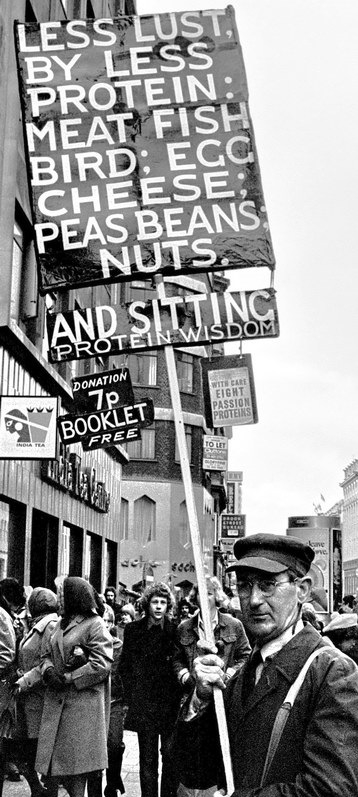
- Green in Oxford Street, 1977
- Born: 22 February 1915; Harringay, London, England
- Died: 12 December 1993 (aged 78); Northolt, London, England
- Known for: Dietary-reform activism
- Military career
- Branch: Royal Navy
- Service years: 1938–1945
- Conflicts: Second World War

Stanley Owen Green (22 February 1915 – 12 December 1993), known as the "Protein Man", was an English human billboard in central London in the latter half of the 20th century. One writer called him "the most famous non-famous person in London". According to Lynne Truss, Green became such a ubiquitous figure around Oxford Street in the West End that he was "present in every black-and-white picture of London crowds that one has ever seen".

For 25 years, from 1968 until 1993, Green patrolled Oxford Street with a placard recommending "protein wisdom", a low-protein diet that he said would dampen the libido and make people kinder. His 14-page self-published pamphlet, Eight Passion Proteins with Care, went through 84 editions and sold 87,000 copies over 20 years. Green's "campaigning for the suppression of desire", as one writer described it, was not always popular, but Londoners developed an affection for him. The Sunday Times interviewed him in 1985, and the fashion house Red or Dead used his "less passion from less protein" slogan in one of its collections. When he died aged 78, The Daily Telegraph, The Guardian and The Times all published obituaries, and the Museum of London acquired his pamphlets and placards. In 2006 his biography was included in the Oxford Dictionary of National Biography.

== Early life ==
Green was born in Harringay, North London, the youngest of four boys to Richard and May Green. His father was a clerk for a bottle stopper manufacturer. After attending Wood Green County School, a mixed grammar school, Green joined the Royal Navy in 1938. He was shocked while in the Navy by the obsession with sex. "I was astonished when things were said quite openly—what a husband would say to his wife when home on leave", he told The Sunday Times "A Life in the Day" column in 1985. "I've always been a moral sort of person."

After leaving the Navy in September 1945 having served through the Second World War, Green worked for the Fine Art Society. In March 1946, he failed the entrance exam for the University of London, then worked for Selfridges and the civil service, and as a storeman for Ealing Borough Council. On two occasions he had lost jobs, he said, because he had refused to be dishonest. In 1962 he held a job with the Post Office, then worked as a self-employed gardener until 1968 when he began his anti-protein campaign. He lived with his parents until they died, his father in 1966 and his mother the following year, after which he was given a council flat in Haydock Green, Northolt, West London.

== His mission ==
=== On the streets ===
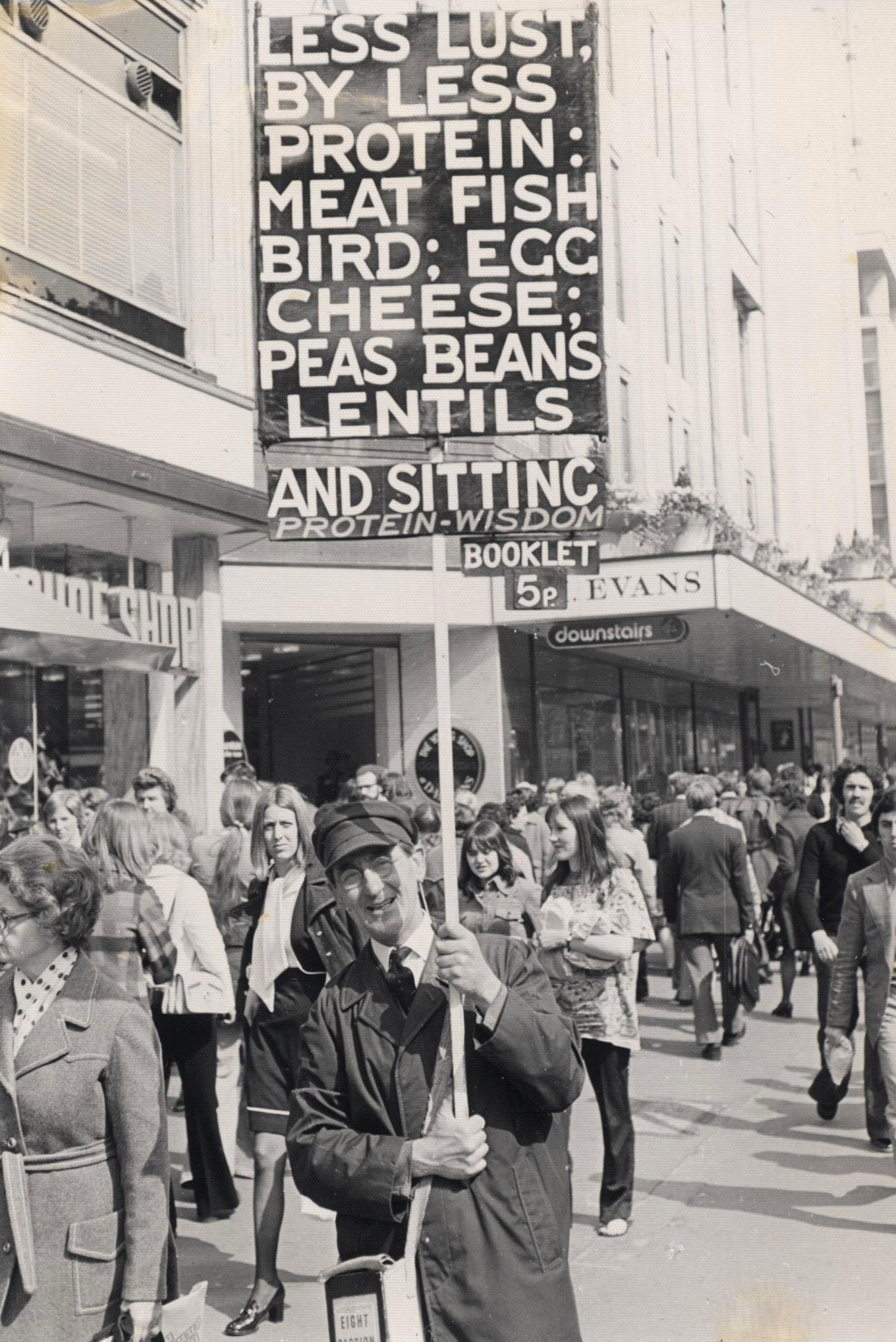
Green in Oxford Street, 1974

Green began his mission in June 1968, at the age of 53, initially in Harrow on Saturdays, becoming a full-time human billboard six months later on Oxford Street. He cycled there from Northolt with a sandwich board attached to his bicycle, a journey that could take up to two hours.

He rose early, and after porridge for breakfast made bread that would rise while he was on patrol, ready for his evening meal. Otherwise his diet consisted of steamed vegetables and pulses, and a pound of apples a day. Lunch was prepared on a Bunsen burner and eaten at 2:30 p.m. in a "warm and secret place" near Oxford Street. The "warm and secret place" was a bench at the far end of one of the platforms at Oxford Circus station, where he would sit after turning his placard upside down and facing the wall.

From Monday to Saturday he walked up and down the street until 6:30 pm, reduced to four days a week from 1985. Saturday evenings were spent with the cinema crowds in Leicester Square. He would go to bed at 12:30 a.m. after saying a prayer. "Quite a good prayer, unselfish too", he told The Sunday Times in 1985. "It is a sort of acknowledgment of God, just in case there happens to be one."

Peter Ackroyd wrote in London: The Biography (2000) that Green was for the most part ignored, becoming "a poignant symbol of the city's incuriosity and forgetfulness". Green was arrested for public obstruction twice, in 1980 and 1985. "The injustice of it upsets me," he said, "because I'm doing such a good job." He took to wearing overalls to protect himself from spit, which he found several times on his hat at the end of the day.

=== Writing ===
External image
- Green's printing press, Gunnersbury Museum

Sundays were spent at home producing Eight Passion Proteins on his printing press, exhibited after his death at the Serpentine Gallery and described by Waldemar Januszczak as "an extraordinary home-made contraption worthy of Heath Robinson". The "terrific sounds of thumping and crashing" caused trouble between Green and his neighbours.

Noted for its eccentric typography, Eight Passion Proteins went through 84 editions, 52 of them between 1973 and 1993. Green carried copies of it in his satchel, selling 20 on weekdays and up to 50 on Saturdays, for 10 pence in 1980 and later 12 pence. By February 1993 he would have sold 87,000 copies. He also sent it to public figures, including five British prime ministers, Prince Charles, the Archbishop of Canterbury and Pope Paul VI.

The pamphlet argued that "those who do not have to work hard with their limbs, and those who are inclined to sit about" will "store up their protein for passion", making retirement, for example, a period of increased passion and marital discord. It ended by warning: "Beware of the fun of indecent suggestions; of the amusement from the titillating scandal of private lives; of the diversion of the undress of low journalism etcetera. These things erode our morals and twist young minds." In addition to the pamphlet, Green left several unpublished manuscripts, including a novel, Behind the Veil: More than Just a Tale; a 67-page text, Passion and Protein; and a 392-page edition of Eight Passion Proteins, which was rejected by Oxford University Press in 1971.

== Recognition ==
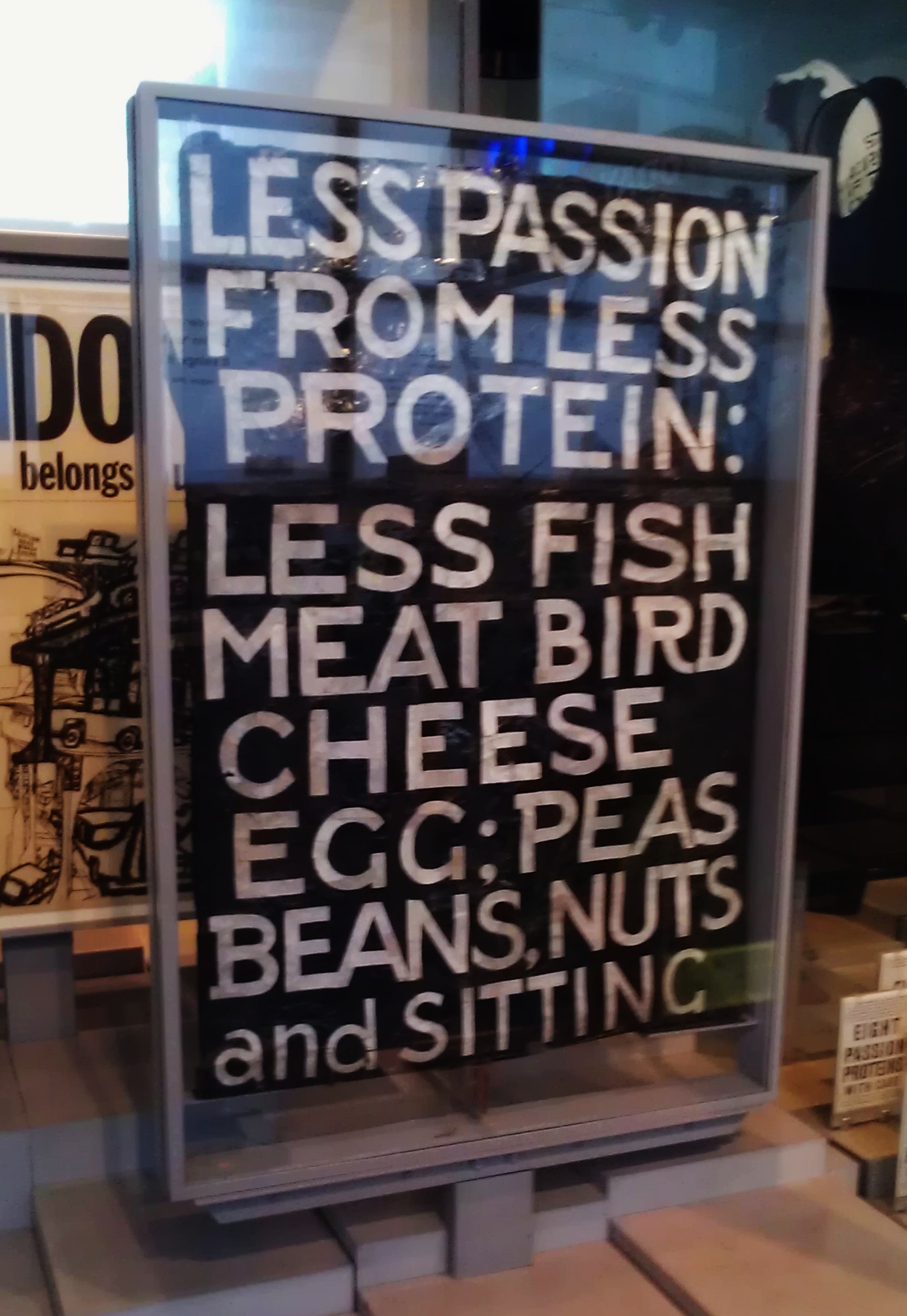
One of Green's placards, Museum of London

Green enjoyed his local fame. The Sunday Times interviewed him in 1985 for its "A Life in the Day" feature, and some of his slogans, including "less passion from less protein" were used on dresses and T-shirts by the London fashion house Red or Dead. (Note: Red or Dead: "Mining the street for inspiration, Red or Dead printed Stanley Green's placard and other selected texts from his message on dresses and t-shirts. Stanley Green was an eccentric English political activist well known along London's Oxford Street for carrying his 'Eat Less Protein' placard. A replica of the placard itself accompanied some of the models wearing utilitarian suits. Every Red or Dead collection showed its ability to turn seamlessly from one source of inspiration to another of completely different origin.") When he died on 12 December 1993 at the age of 78, The Daily Telegraph, The Guardian and The Times all published obituaries. His letters, diaries, pamphlets and placards were given to the Museum of London, which as of 2010 held 36 of the 84 editions of Eight Passion Proteins with Care. Other artefacts went to the Gunnersbury Park Museum. His printing press was included in Cornelia Parker's exhibition "The Maybe" (1995) at the Serpentine Gallery, featuring Tilda Swinton in a glass box, as well as a cushion and carpet apparently from Freud's couch and one of Winston Churchill's cigars.

Years after his death Green was still remembered by writers and bloggers. In 2006 he was given an entry in the Oxford Dictionary of National Biography, while the artist Alun Rowlands' documentary fiction, 3 Communiqués (2007), portrayed him as "trawl[ing] the city campaigning for the suppression of desire through diet". In 2013 Martin Gordon included a track about him on his album Include Me Out. He was also the subject of an eponymous biographical song on the Melancholy Thug's album A Trip to the Sewers of Paris (2018). Peter Watts wrote in Londonist in 2016 that Green was for a time "the most famous non-famous person in London, a figure recognised by millions even if few ever actually spoke to him. Oxford Circus has never felt quite the same without him." When Green died, Lynne Truss suggested in The Times that he be inserted retroactively into the final paragraph of Charles Dickens' novel Little Dorrit:

They went quietly down into the roaring streets, inseparable and blessed; and as they passed along in sunshine and shade, the noisy and the eager, and the arrogant and the forward and the vain, and that man, you know, with the "Less Passion from Less Protein" sign above his head, fretted and chafed, and made their usual uproar.

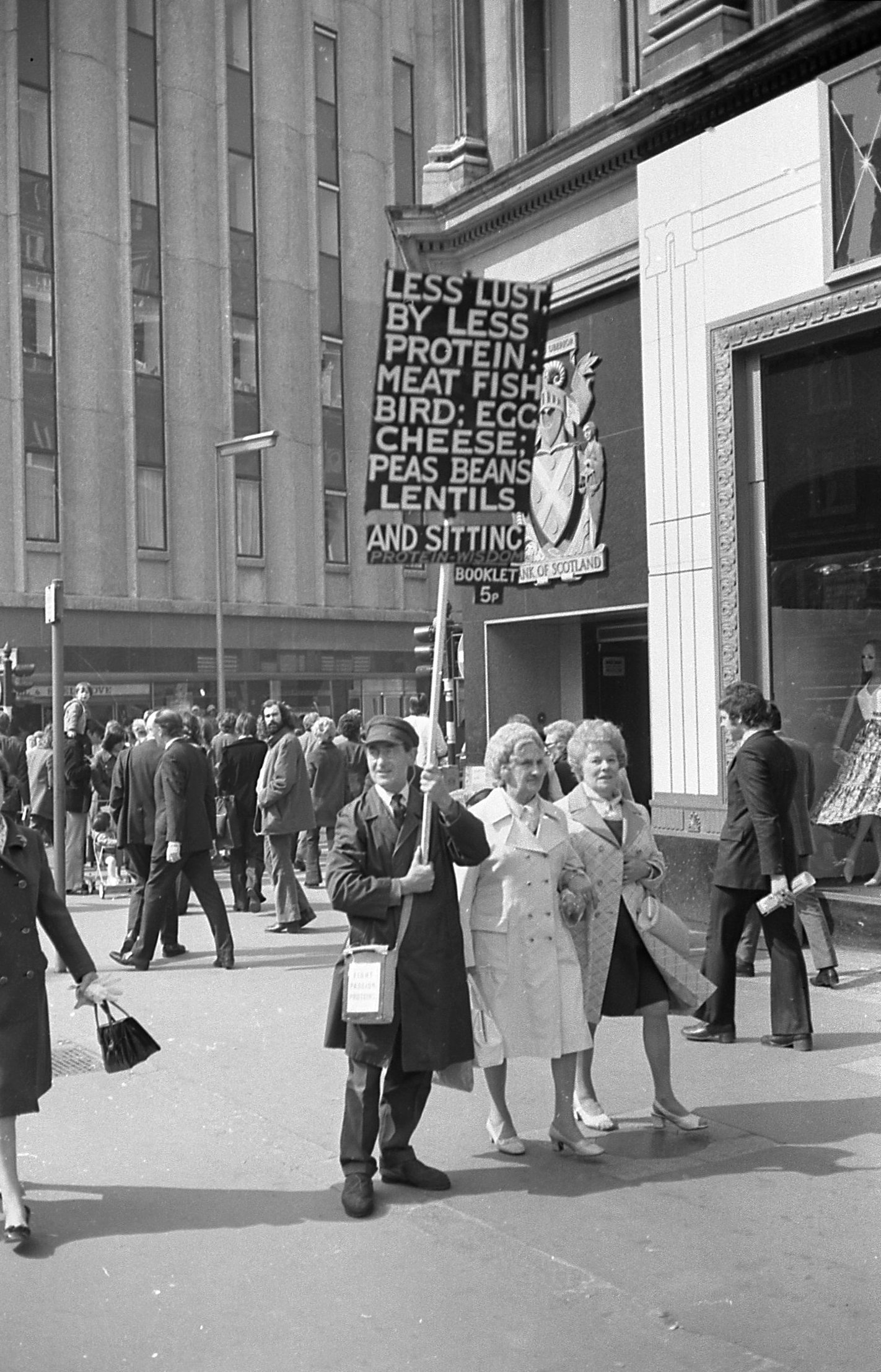
Near Oxford Street, 1974

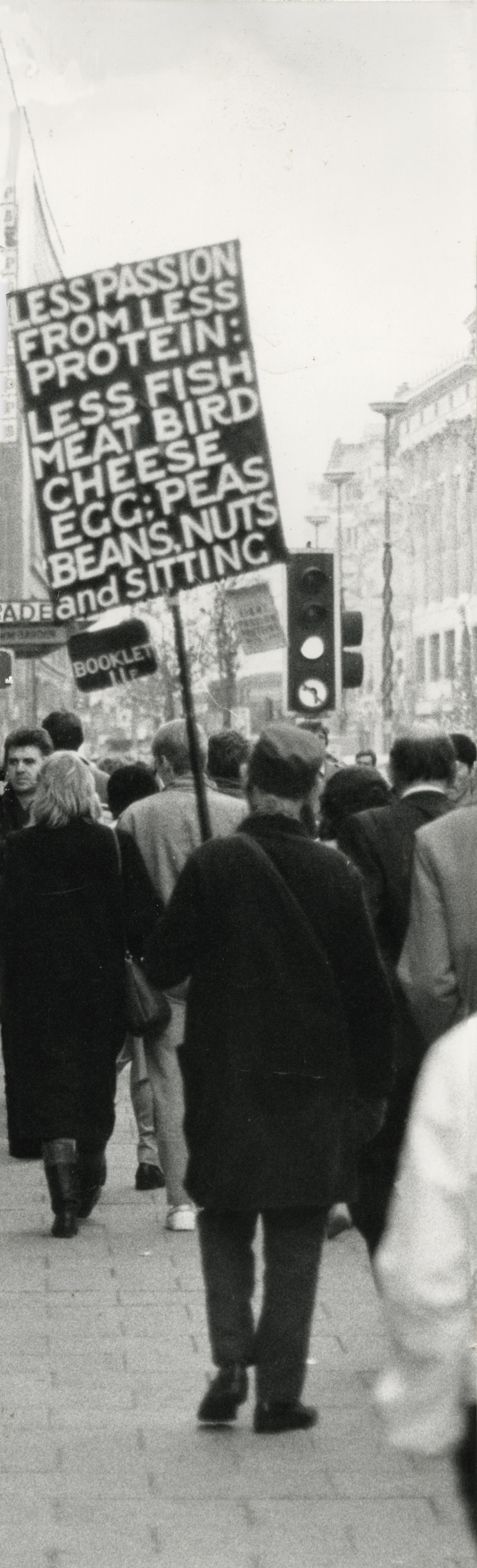
Near Dean Street, c. 1983

Eight Passion Proteins with Care

== Notes and references ==
=== Works cited ===
- Ackroyd, Peter (2000). London: The Biography. London: Vintage.
- Carter, Philip (May 2006). "Green, Stanley Owen (1915–1993)". Oxford Dictionary of National Biography (online ed.). Oxford University Press. doi:10.1093/ref:odnb/92286. (Subscription, Wikipedia Library access or UK public library membership required.)
- Green, Stanley. Eight Passion Proteins. London: Stanley Green. Archived from the original on 16 February 2003.
- Green, Stanley (14 April 1985). "My own message to the streets". The Sunday Times Magazine.
- Januszczak, Waldemar (10 September 1995). "An exhibition of herself: Tilda Swinton". The Sunday Times. p. 10.
- Lake, Matt; Moran, Mark; Sceurman, Mark (2007). Weird England. London: Sterling Publishing Company.
- "Lives and times: Stanley Green". The Scotsman. 15 July 2006. Archived from the original on 26 November 2015.
- McKie, David (21 July 2008). "Pining for the boards". The Guardian. Archived from the original on 5 July 2018.
- Pearce, Susan M.; Martin, Paul (2002). The Collector's Voice: Critical Readings in the Practice of Collecting. London: Ashgate Publishing Ltd.
- Quinn, Tom; Leaver, Ricky (2008). Eccentric London. London: New Holland Publishers.
- Ross, Cathy; Broughton, Chris (23 November 2017). "Less Protein, Less Lust: Decoding the Protein Man's placard". Museum Crush.
- Rowlands, Alun (2007). 3 Communiqués. London: Book Works. ISBN 978-1-870699-91-4. Archived from the original on 2 July 2013.
- Truss, Lynne (25 January 1994). "The principal message of the Oxford Street man with the placard was consistency". The Times. p. 16.
- Watts, Peter (27 October 2016). "Meet The Eccentrics of London". Londonist. Archived from the original on 6 March 2019.
- Weeks, David; James, Jamie (1995). Eccentrics: A Study of Sanity and Strangeness. London: Random House.
- Willis, David (26 January 1994). "A consuming passion ... Obituary: Stanley Green". The Guardian. section 2, p. 10.

=== Further reading ===
- Cumming, Valerie; Merriman, Nick; Ross, Catherine (1996). "The Protein Man". Museum of London, London: Scala Books.
- Donaldson, William (2004). Brewer's Rogues, Villains, and Eccentrics. London: Cassell Reference.
- Ross, C. (March 1997). "The scourge of sex and nuts and sitting". The Oldie.
- "The Less Protein Man – a sight of old London". The London Traveler. Archived from the original on 31 January 2011.
- Weeks, David Joseph with Ward, Kate (1998). Eccentrics: The Scientific Investigation. Stirling: Stirling University Press.
- Wicks, Ben (8 March 1986). "Come on up and see my collection of passion fruit", The Toronto Star, 8 March 1986.
