= Joan McVittie =

British headteacher (born 1952)

Dame Joan Christine McVittie, DBE (born 1952) is a British head teacher. She graduated from Birmingham University with a BSc in Biological Sciences in 1974.

She was Headteacher of Woodside High School in Haringey, North London. She is a past president of the Association of School and College Leaders. McVittie was appointed Dame Commander of the Order of the British Empire (DBE) in the 2013 New Year Honours for services to education.

== Links ==
- Profile, checkcompany.co.uk; accessed 15 June 2016.
