= John Donald Garner =

British diplomat (1931–2019)

John Donald Garner CMG CVO (1931–2019) was a British diplomat. He was Chargé d'affaires to Afghanistan from 1981 to 1984, although his term was disrupted by the Soviet–Afghan War. He was High Commissioner to the Gambia from 1984 to 1987.

He was educated at Trinity Grammar School.
