= Yuri Gulyayev (physicist) =

Soviet-Russian physicist and inventor

- Юрий Гуляев
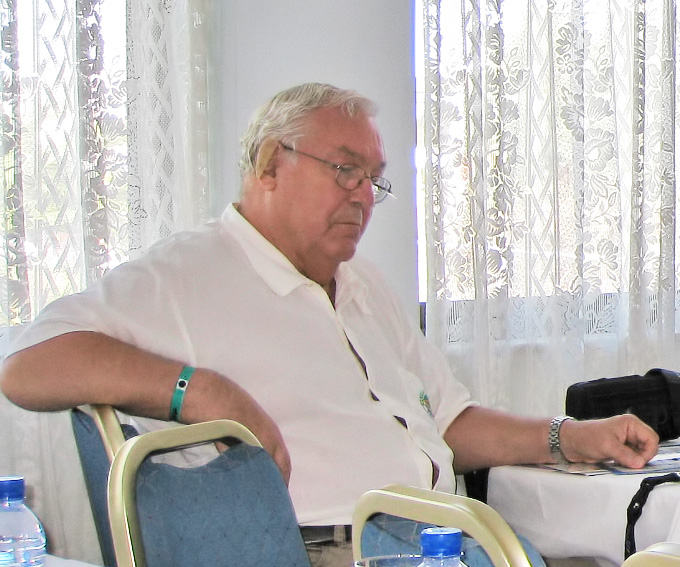
- Gulyayev in 2010
- Born: 18 September 1935 (age 90); Tomilino, Moscow Oblast, Russian SFSR, Soviet Union
- Citizenship: Soviet Union, Russia
- Education: Moscow Institute of Physics and Technology
- Known for: Predicted and studied new type of surface acoustic waves known as Bleustein-Gulyaev waves
- Awards: USSR State Prize (1974, 1984), EPS Europhysics Prize (1979), State Prize of the Russian Federation (2006)
- Scientific career
- Fields: Physics
- Workplaces: Institute of Radio-engineering and Electronics; Moscow Institute of Physics and Technology

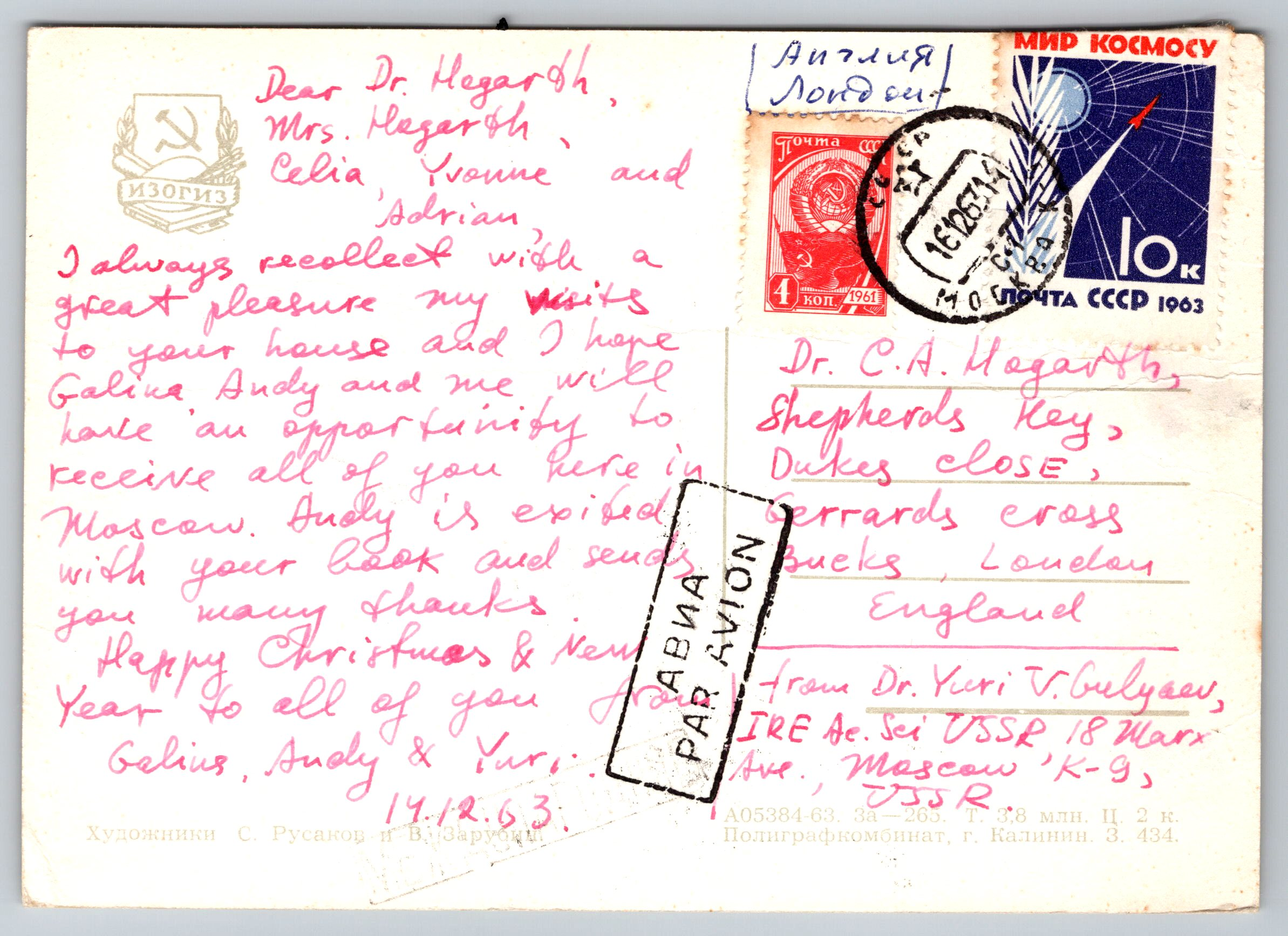
Postcard from Gulyayev to Cyril Hogarth, December 1963

Yuri Vasilyevich Gulyayev (Russian: Юрий Васильевич Гуляев; born 18 September 1935) is a Soviet and Russian physicist and inventor, Full Member and Member of the Presidium of Russian Academy of Sciences (1992), head of the Semiconductor Electronics chair in the Moscow Institute of Physics and Technology (1971). Yuri Gulyayev works in the field of solid-state physics, radiophysics, electronics, computer science and medical electronics. Gulyayev is a pioneer in the fields of modern physics: acousto-electronics, acousto-optics, spin wave electronics.

In 1995, the International Astronomical Union named the asteroid 1976 YB2 as 6942 Yurigulyaev.

== Honours and awards ==
- Order "For Merit to the Fatherland", 3rd and 4th class
- USSR State Prize, twice (1974, 1984)
- EPS Europhysics Prize (1979)
- Order of the Red Banner of Labour (1985)
- Order of Honour (2006)
- State Prize of the Russian Federation (2006)
