= Cyril Hogarth =

British physicist (1924–2006)

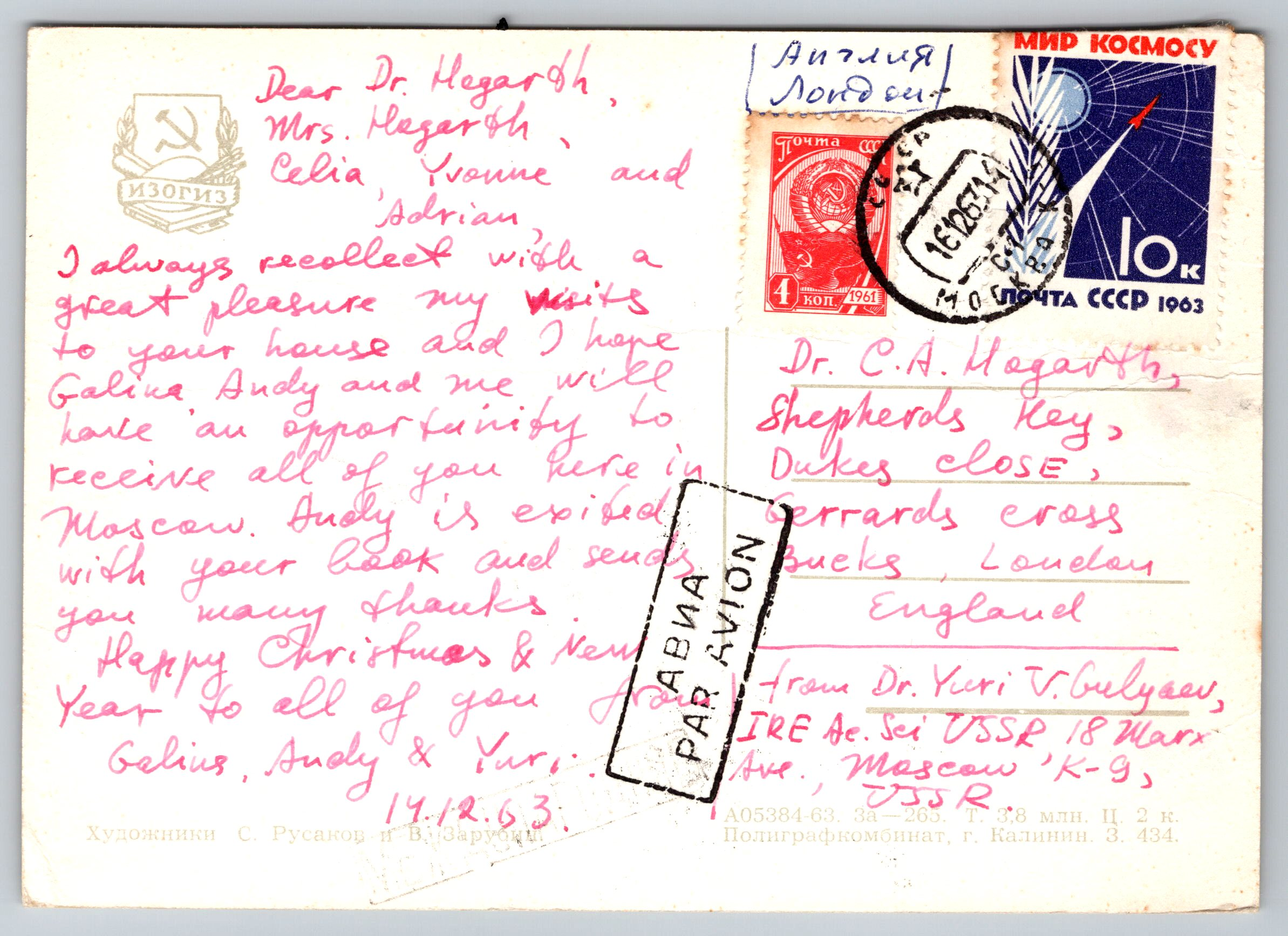
Postcard from Yuri Gulyayev to Hogarth, 16 December 1963

Cyril Alfred Hogarth (22 January 1924 – 6 November 2006) was a British physicist and chairman of South Bucks District Council. A pioneer in the field of oxide semiconductors, he was a professor, head of the physics department, and administrator at Brunel University London, where he worked for 31 years.

== Early life and education ==
Hogarth was born in 1924, and grew up in Tottenham, north London. He was educated at Tottenham County School. Hogarth earned a degree from the University of London.

In 1948, he received a PhD from Queen Mary University of London, studying with Professor J. P. Andrews. That year, Hogarth's theoretical solution for determining the dependence of thermoelectric power of cadmium oxide on ambient oxygen pressure was published in Nature and in Philosophical Magazine. He later received a doctor of science degree in 1977.

== Career ==
From 1943 to 1946, Hogarth worked on naval radar and countermeasures in the UK, Canada, the US and the Arctic. After earning his PhD, he lectured at Chelsea College of Science and Technology and the University of Reading, before spending some years at the Royal Radar Establishment.

Hogarth was "closely involved" in the founding of Brunel University London from 1958, its first professor of physics, head of its physics department, and its pro vice-chancellor for a year in 1980.

In 1969, Hogarth was elected as vice-president of the Institute of Physics and the Physical Society.

Hogarth retired from Brunel University in 1989, but continued his research and published articles regularly through the mid-1990s. In 1990 and 1991 alone, he published 17 and 13 articles, respectively, in the Journal of Materials Science. In addition to semiconductors, his research focused on materials and their properties.

== Personal life and death ==
In 1951, Cyril married Dr Audrey Hogarth (1926 – 2010), who had a doctorate in dairy bacteriology from Reading University. The Hogarths lived in Gerrards Cross, where Audrey served as a magistrate for 29 years. They had three children together: Celia Stuart-Lee, a teacher; Adrian Hogarth, a lawyer; and Yvonne, who died in 1994.

Cyril Hogarth was chairman of the Gerrards Cross Conservative Association and served as a district councillor in South Bucks for 20 years. He died on 6 November 2006, immediately after a parish council meeting, most likely from a heart attack, at the age of 82.

== Selected publications ==
- Alani, SKJ; Hogarth, CA; Elmalawany, RA (1985). Journal of Materials Science 20(2):661.
- Anastasiadis, C; Triantis, D; Hogarth, CA (2007). "Comments on the phenomena underlying pressure stimulated currents (PSC) in dielectric rock materials". Journal of Materials Science 42.
- Khan, MN; Harani, R; Ahmed, MM; Hogarth, CA (1985). Journal of Materials Science 20(6):2207.
