= Jason Zook =

Jason Zook, originally called Jason Sadler, is the founder of I Wear Your Shirt, born in 1982 to Kelly and Steve Sadler.

== Early life ==
During his early years, Sadler lived in San Diego and New Jersey. Later, in 2000, he moved to Ponte Vedra Beach, Florida so that he could join the basketball team at Jacksonville University. However, before the beginning of basketball season of his freshman year, he hurt his knee. Shortly thereafter, he transferred to the University of North Florida. At the University of North Florida, Sadler received the Bachelor of Fine Arts in 2005, with an emphasis on marketing and graphic design.

== T-shirts ==
Sadler said that he wore the shirts for the entire day even if attending a wedding or eating a fancy dinner with his girlfriend.

== Name changes ==
In 2012, Sadler auctioned off the rights to change his last name to whatever company bid the highest. Headsets.com eventually won, paying $45,500 to change his name to Jason HeadsetsDotCom. In 2013, he legally changed his name to Jason SurfrApp, a surfing application, that purchased his last name for $50,000. Sadler said he did not have a constant father figure in his childhood, so he did not feel a bond to his last name. He finally changed his name to Jason Zook, adopting the last name of his great-grandfather Roy Zook.
