= Nurv =

American film production company

NURV
- Website type: Marketing agency
- Owner: Andrew Fischer
- Website: https://www.nurv.com
- Current status: Active

Nurv is a film production and viral marketing company based out of Colorado Springs, CO. It was founded by Andrew Fischer. Nurv's viral marketing campaigns include human billboard advertising, in which CEO Fischer auctioned advertising space on his forehead in the form of a temporary tattoo on eBay in 2005. As of 2011, Nurv was producing a feature-length movie starring viral video stars titled The Chronicles of Rick Roll.

== Human ad space ==
Nurv CEO Andrew Fischer first gained international spotlight in January 2005 when he successfully auctioned temporary tattoo advertising space on his forehead for $37,375. Fischer was interviewed by many top media outlets worldwide including ABC, BBC, CBS, CNBC, CNN, FOX, MSNBC and NBC. He started a human advertising trend that ranged from pregnant bellies to arms and legs, most of which were auctioned through eBay. According to Snorestop, Fischer's sponsor, their web sales quintupled while retail sales jumped 50%.

== Web properties ==
In addition to serving clients, NURV owns and manages a medium size web forum called General Forum. General Forum's 25,000+ members have made over 1,000,000 posts since its formation in 2000.

== Viral videos ==
NURV has produced several viral videos. NURV's first viral video to gain media attention was an unofficial mashup trailer featuring Dumb & Dumber footage set to the music from the Inception trailer.

In 2011, NURV made a viral video that was a concept trailer for an internet meme filled movie that NURV was producing called The Chronicles of Rick Roll. It featured live action footage of top YouTube stars including Antoine Dodson, Leeroy Jenkins, and others.
