= Sandwich board =

Form of advertising

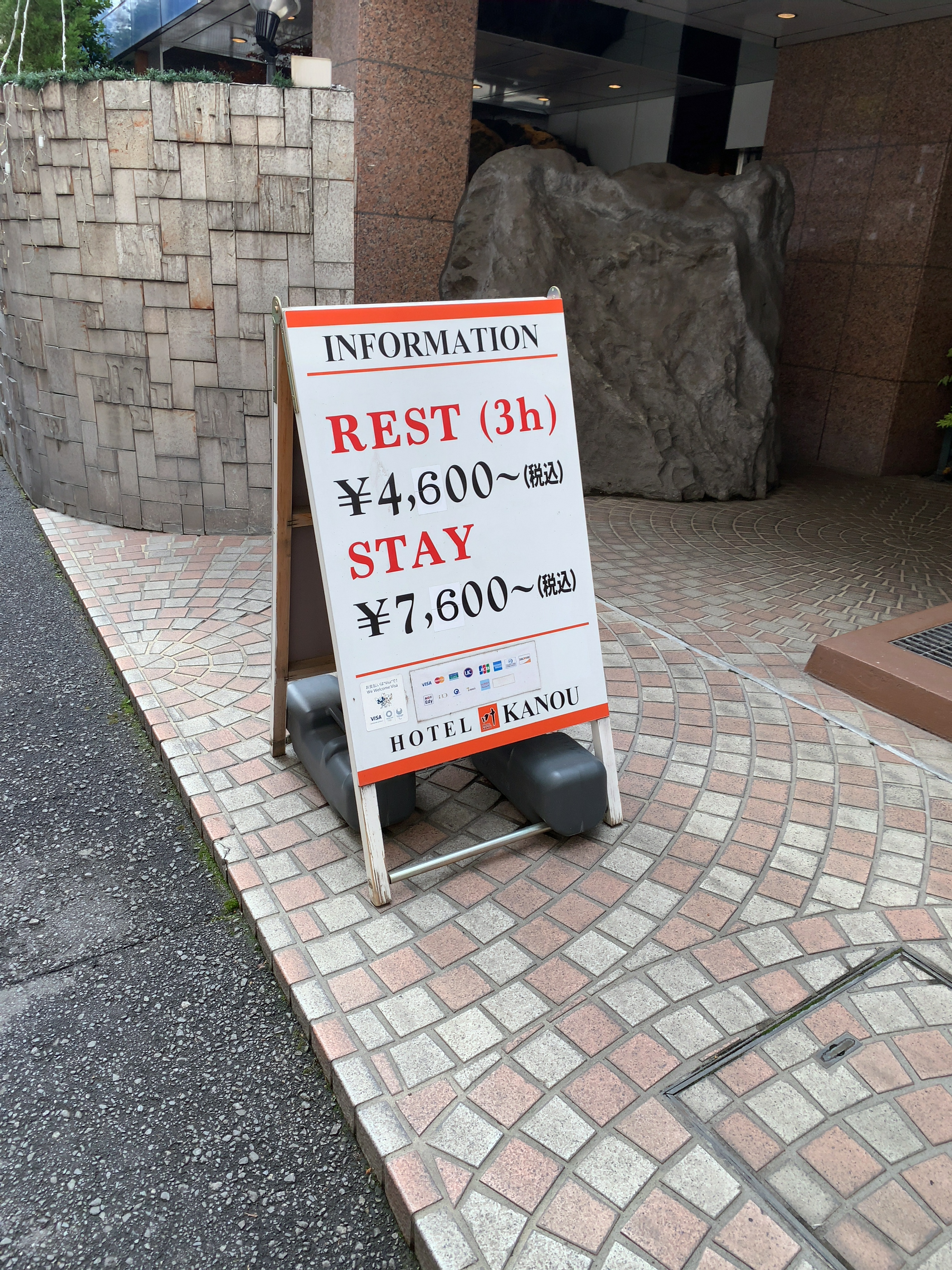
An A-board set up next to a hotel

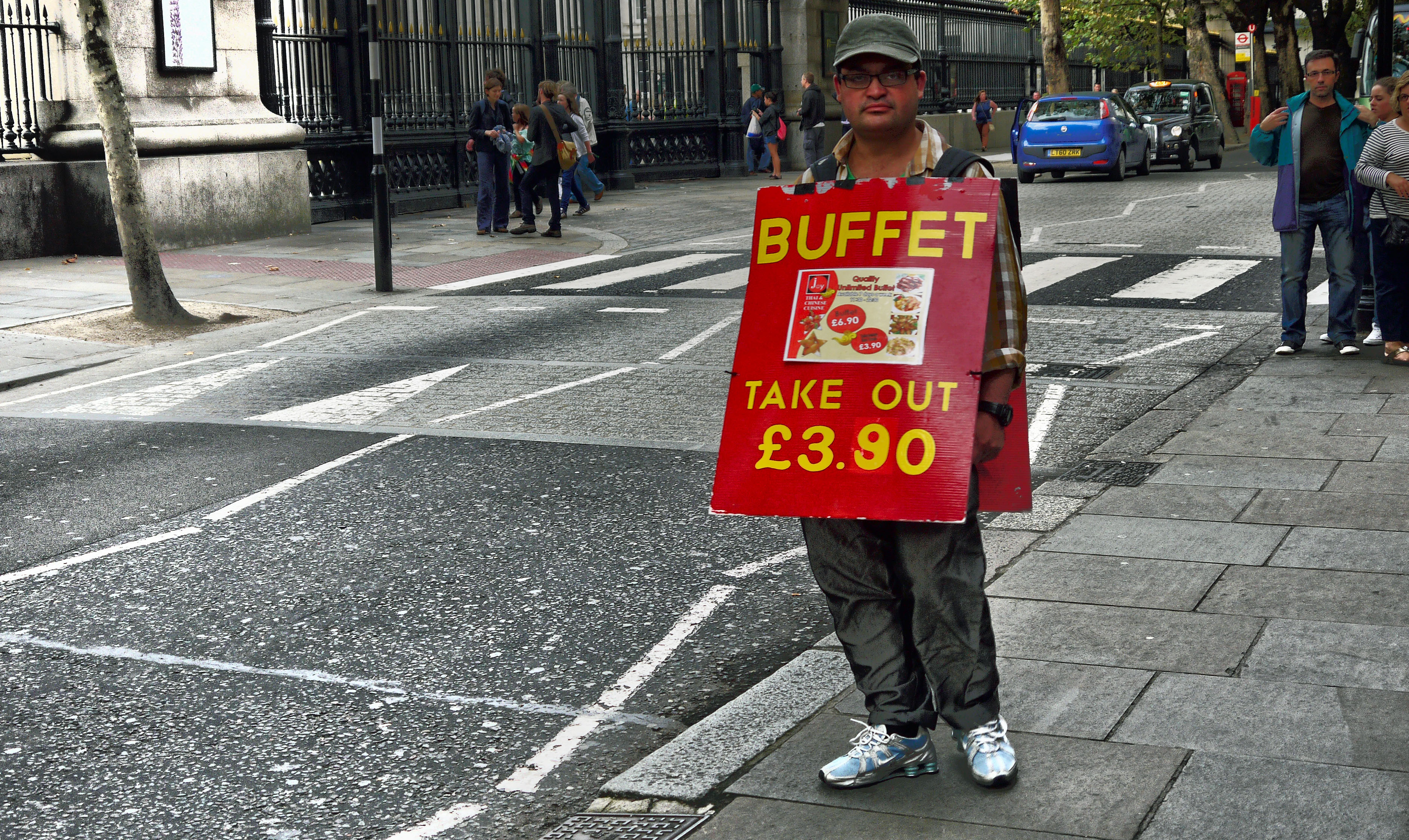
Man wearing a sandwich board ("sandwich man")

A sandwich board is a type of advertisement tool composed of two boards with a message or graphic on it and being either carried by a person, with one board in front and one behind in a triangle shape, hinged along the top, creating a "sandwich" effect; or set up next to a store advertising its goods. In this way, the advertising message can be read on both sides interchangeably.

== History ==
The increased competition for poster space and the inconveniences of an advertising tax led the advertisers to generate a type of advertisement that moves a handy sales tool to promote sales. The term "sandwich man" was coined by Charles Dickens. He described these advertisers as "a piece of human flesh between two slices of paste board". Sandwich boards were most popular in the 19th century, and have largely been supplanted by billboards, which are more effective in advertising to passers-by who are now likely to be in automobiles, rather than traveling by foot.

However, they are still frequently to be seen on major shopping streets such as Oxford Street, London; Champs Élysées, Paris, and 42nd Street, New York City, where they are used to advertise offers from particular stores most often in adjacent side-streets.

== Types ==
There are generally two types of sandwich boards.

=== Carried version ===
The carried version is usually attached to straps acting as suspenders, allowing the person wearing the boards to carry the weight on his or her shoulders and keeping the boards balanced on the wearer. The wearer might also pass out flyers or shout advertising slogans. In contemporary drawings by George Scharf, sandwich men are seen parading in a queue cladded in a specific costume. They were gorgeously dressed at the beginning but later they were portrayed wearing shabby clothes in many illustrations that failed to attract consumers' attention. In many cities of the world these types of advertisements are considered illegal and is a punishable offence. According to the London Hackney Carriage Act 1853 (16 & 17 Vict. c. 33) and section 9 of the Metropolitan Streets Act 1867 (30 & 31 Vict. c. 134), it is not lawful for any person to carry any picture, placard, notice, or advertisement, on any carriage or on horseback or on foot except those which are approved of by the Commissioner of Police.

=== A-board ===
Another is called "A-board" which is kept next to the stores, on public transport grounds, such as sidewalks or pedestrian zones to draw the attention of the customers passing by. These A-boards resemble the shape of letter A. In some modern A-boards the conventional two boards have been replaced by a single board hanging within the frame. A-boards are most typically deployed in busy pedestrian areas to advertise businesses. Advertising the business website or social media page on these boards helps the business get recognized locally as well as internationally. This kind of advertising is most popular among bars and restaurants. For some small businesses it is the main type of advertising.

== Materials used ==
Many different types materials are used to make these boards. The carried type is generally made up of light materials like cardboard or paperboard and yarn to hang it to the shoulders.

The conventional types of A-boards are traditionally made with any rigid flat material such as fibre board, chip board, wood, plyboard or MDF. Modern A-boards are made with plastic, steel or aluminum and in some of them the hinges are made with leather. Cheaper A-boards are made with wood-frame with cloth nailed upon and printed with screen-print or painted by hand. Chalkboards are also used as a A-board material, with the advertisement messages written by hand.

There are advantages and disadvantages to using different materials. Wooden frames can be damaged by termites. Plastic materials like PVC become fragile with weather and polyethylene sandwich boards get warped in varying temperatures which causes bowing or dishing of the surface, which distorts the message or graphic printed on it. Phthalates used as plasticizers and lead used for workability and stability in PVC contribute to health complications. Moreover printing on plastic materials which needs a special type of ink which is costly. Chalkboard A-boards allow for messages to be easily replaced, but they must be written by hand, and the messages are susceptible to rain. Aluminum or steel frames are comparatively durable, but vulnerable to strong winds and bad weather conditions, especially rain, and wear out over time. On windier days sandbags are sometimes hung under the board as a counterweight which gives balance and stability. Colors often fade away after prolonged exposure to the sun. The use of different materials in a single object makes these boards unsuitable for recycling.

== See also ==
- Human billboard
- The Sandwich Man (1966 film)
