= Human billboard =

Person who applies an advertisement on themselves

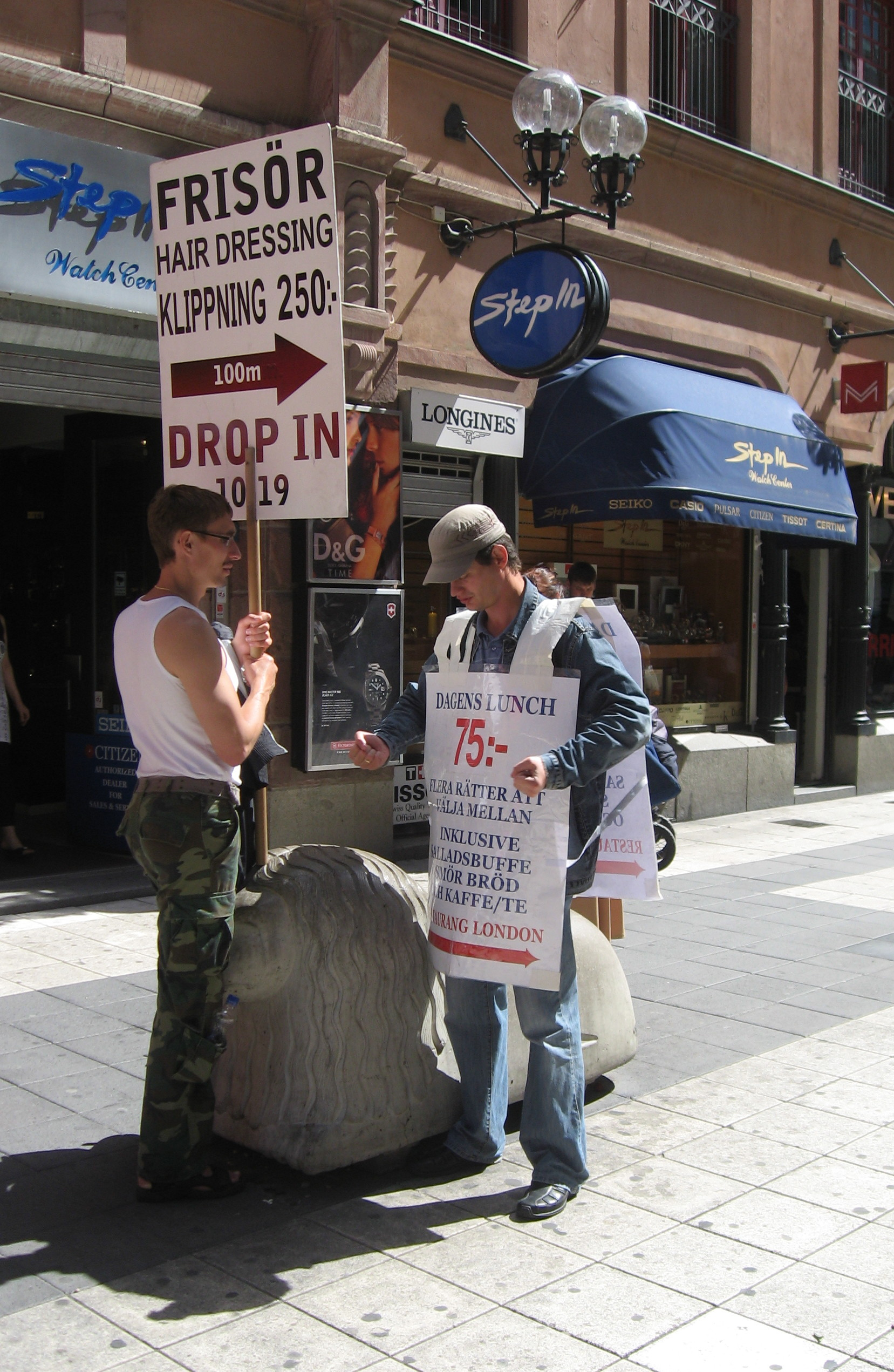
Two human billboards in Stockholm, one holding a placard and the other wearing a sandwich board

A human billboard is someone who displays an advertisement on their person. Most commonly, this means holding or wearing a sign of some sort, but also may include wearing advertising as clothing or in extreme cases, having advertising tattooed on the body. Sign holders are known as human directionals in the advertising industry, or colloquially as sign walkers, sign wavers, sign spinners, sign twirlers or (in British territories) sandwich men. Frequently, they will spin/sway or dance or wear costumes with the promotional sign in order to attract attention.

== History ==
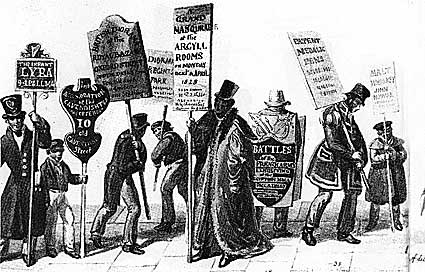
An artistic depiction of human billboards in 19th century London, by George Scharf

Human billboards have been used for centuries. In the 19th century London, the practice began when advertising posters became subject to a tax and competition for wall space became fierce. Prince Pückler-Muskau described the activity in 1820s London as such:

Formerly people were content to paste advertisements up; now they are ambulant. One man had a pasteboard hat, three times as high as other hats, on which is written in great letters, "Boots at twelve shillings a pair—warranted".

Furthermore, besides holding signs, some human billboards would wear sandwich boards. Charles Dickens described these advertisers as "a piece of human flesh between two slices of paste board". It was claimed in The Times in mid-1823 that such human billboards were a London invention—while a familiar sight in London, the "biped advertisement" was new in Paris at that time.

A man walks the Palais Royal and the most frequented streets in the neighbourhood, with one large placard covering the whole of his back, and another extending along the front part of his body down to his knees. It contains the announcement of a new coach between London and Paris. On the back he bears the French, and on his breast the English. The French have given this non-descript animal—this walking placard—the title of l'Homme-affiche, or biped advertisement.

The banning of posters from private property in London in 1839 greatly increased the use of human billboards. As the novelty of seeing humans carrying placards wore off, advertisers would come up with variations on the theme in order to catch the eye, such as having a "parade" of identical human billboards, or having the human billboards wear outrageous costumes.

== Modern times ==
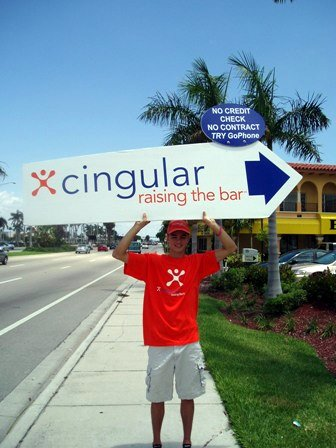
Complementary clothing advertisement and directional billboard

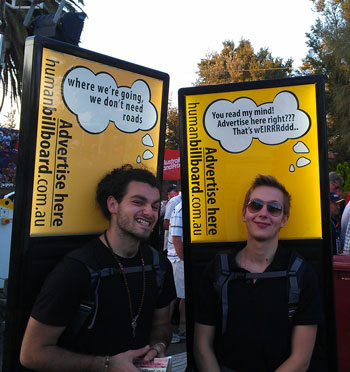
Human billboards with advertising space for hire, in Melbourne, Australia

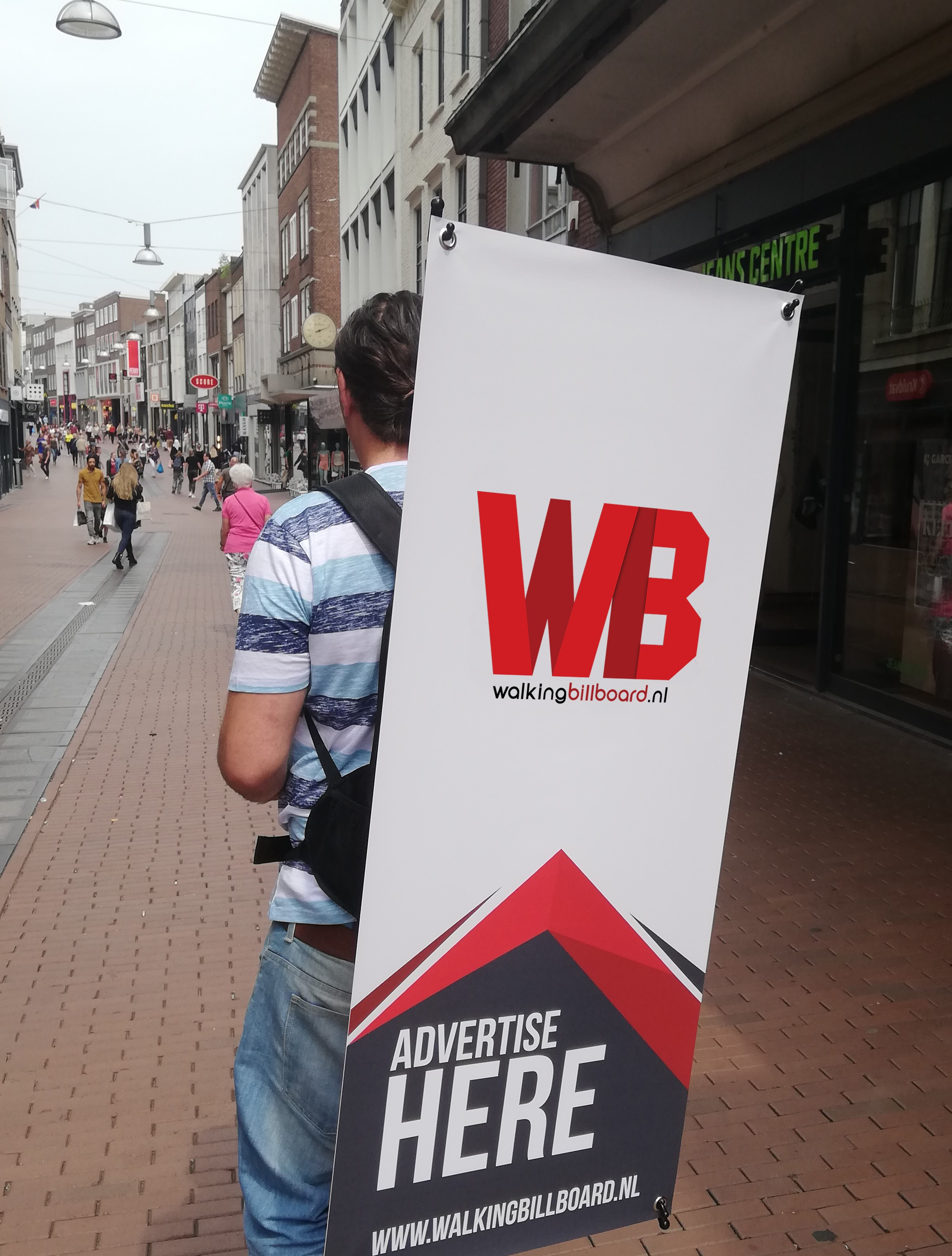
Modern walking billboard promotion in the Netherlands

Human directionals are still widely used, especially in areas that have a lot of pedestrian traffic, but even in places that have a great deal of automobile traffic. For the latter, the signs will frequently be shaped like arrows in order to direct traffic to the location being advertised. Eye Shot, a Lake Forest, California company claims to have invented modern sign spinning using arrow-shaped signs. The modern human directional employs a number of tricks to attract attention, such as spinning the sign on one finger, throwing it up in the air and spinning it, or even riding the sign like a horse. Another California company, AArrowSign Spinners, conducts "boot camps" to train its employees, and has also filed patent applications for a number of its "signature moves".

However, the use of such attention-grabbing tricks has been criticized by city officials as being distracting to drivers, and as a result, a number of cities have banned sign twirling. Some companies like Enlarge Media Group and Jet Media are able to offer human directionals as "sign walkers", a less distracting form of sign twirling. Further restrictions on sign walkers in Arizona caused Jet Media Promotions, the state's largest supplier of human billboards, to sue the city of Scottsdale. The company's owner then successfully campaigned for legislation that made it illegal for cities in Arizona to ban such advertising.

Demand for human directionals has significantly increased since the introduction of sign-twirling techniques. In temperate and warm locations, sign holders can be employed year-round and their effectiveness has been amply demonstrated. For example, during the month of October 2006, nearly 8% of the 3,600 people who visited model homes in a housing development in Moreno Valley, California were directed there by human directionals. The Entertainment Factory in Florida provides human directionals to several successful businesses in Central Florida. Some use them as their sole form of advertising. Naturally, there are concerns that just as in 19th-century London, as human directionals become more and more commonplace, their effectiveness will be diminished.

In the U.S., independent tax preparers, and some tax-preparation chains, use sign wavers in costume, seasonally near the US personal income tax deadline of April 15. The costumes are usually of the Statue of Liberty or Uncle Sam. This seems to be a recent, 21st-century trend and is becoming common and competitive.

Sign wavers are also commonly used in the U.S. for Halloween stores, which are only temporary and relocate each year, and thus do not have permanent store signs, nor time to gradually build a customer base by word of mouth, or by being shown on web mapping services. These human billboards often wear a Halloween costume supplied by the store.

== Clothing ==
Advertising on clothing has also long been used, with T-shirts being extremely popular. At first, T-shirts were used exclusively as undergarments, but as early as the 1930s, they were already used for advertising, with a 1939 The Wizard of Oz promotional shirt being a prized collector's item today. The 1948 United States presidential campaign featured a T-shirt with "Dew It for Dewey", referring to candidate Thomas Dewey, which is now housed in the Smithsonian Institution. T-shirts have since been used to advertise all different kinds of products, services, and political messages.

== Tattoos ==
In 1999, Vibe magazine predicted that companies in the next millennium would pay people to get tattoos advertising their brands. In March 2001, American professional basketball player Rasheed Wallace rejected an offer from advertising firm Fifty Rubies Marketing to wear a tattoo advertising a candy company's product. However, a month later, the cheerleaders for Lincoln Lightning's High Voltage Dance Team wore 2-inch by 4-inch temporary tattoos ("tadoos") that advertised local companies on their bare midriffs. In September 2001, a prominent online casino paid boxer Bernard Hopkins US$100,000 to wear a temporary tattoo on his back during his championship fight with Félix Trinidad, making him the first athlete to wear a tattoo advertisement during a professional sports event. Six months later, the company did the same to participants in the television show Celebrity Boxing.

The company's efforts drew immediate criticism from consumer watchdog groups. Despite this, the move was successful, with the casino's web site traffic increasing 200% after the airing of the show. The company has since followed up with temporary tattoos on a topless woman at the 2003 U.S. Open and a streaker who ran at the 2003 French Open as well as the 2003 UEFA Cup final.

The first documented instance of person being paid to get a permanent tattoo for advertising purposes was 22-year-old Jim Nelson, who in 2003 sold the space on the back of his head to CI Host, a web hosting service for $7,000. In the first six months after its application, the tattoo drew in 500 new customers for the company. In 2005, Andrew Fischer gained worldwide notoriety for auctioning his forehead space on eBay for temporary tattoo advertising, with the final bid coming in at $37,375 for thirty days' worth. Since then, tattoo advertising has become relatively popular, with a number of companies offering such services, and even large companies like Toyota having used it. However, The Globe and Mail reported that there were more people selling parts of their body for advertising than there were buyers.

During the 2012 U.S. presidential election campaign, professional wrestler Eric Hartsburg garnered media attention for getting a Romney campaign "R" logo permanently tattooed on his right temple. Hartsburg had offered a tattoo-placement via eBay and was contacted by an unnamed Republican supporter, who paid $15,000.00 for the promotion. No direct connection to the official Romney campaign was claimed. Although he had originally intended to keep the tattoo, Hartsburg expressed disappointment with the defeated candidate's post-election comments and decided to have the design removed, but has stated that he does not regret his decision in getting it. However, Hartsburg ultimately kept the tattoo, and it remains on his temple to this day.

== Other ==
For the launch of its Windows Vista software, Microsoft employed a "human billboard" which was a performance art piece reminiscent of Cirque du Soleil. In this event, people were suspended along the side of a building and moved banners across a backdrop, creating the Vista logo in the process.

BuyMyFace.com was a website created by two University of Cambridge graduates, Ross Harper and Edward Moyse, to repay almost £50,000 in student debt (equivalent to £73,936 in 2025). Each day the site would display portrait pictures of the pair with an advertiser's logo or alternative image painted on their faces, with travel, activities and stunts able to be sponsored. The year-long project began on October 1, 2011, and by the end had reportedly earned more than the debt owed.

== Legality ==
In many countries this type of ad is considered illegal.

According to London Hackney Carriage Act 1853 (16 & 17 Vict. c. 33) and section 9 of the Metropolitan Streets Act 1867 (30 & 31 Vict. c. 134), it was not lawful for any person to carry any picture, placard, notice, or advertisement, on any carriage or on horseback or on foot in London except those which are approved of by the Commissioner of Police of the Metropolis or the Commissioner of the City of London Police.

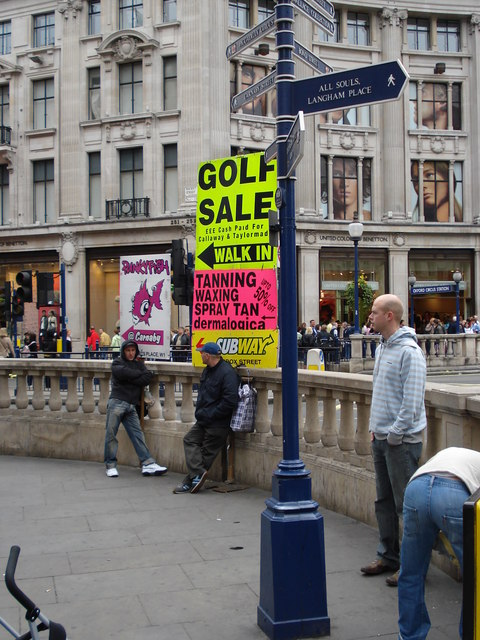
A "golf sale" sign in Oxford Circus in 2007

In 2002, a London judge ruled that "golf sale" placards were not covered by laws on attaching adverts to buildings, leading to an increase in human billboards in central London. Writing in the Guardian, John Harris described them as "huge, seven-foot square things, bolted on to tubular constructions that look like crucifixes". A law was planned to ban them in 2006.

== In popular culture ==
- In Leave It to Beaver season 1 episode 9 ("The Clubhouse"), Beaver becomes a human billboard to try to make money after meeting a man in the park doing the same.
- In NCIS: Los Angeles season 4 episode 11 ("Drive") Marty Deeks goes undercover as a sign twirler.
- In Hawaii Five-0 season 5 episode 10 ("Wawahi moeʻuhane"/"Broken Dreams") Jerry Ortega gets a job as a sign twirler working for Kamekona.
- In the 2020 film Soul, major supporting character Moonwind is a sign twirler.
- Lead character Evelyn Wang in the 2022 film Everything Everywhere All At Once is a sign twirler in another universe.

== See also ==
- Stanley Green (Protein Man), well-known Londoner who campaigned against dietary protein for many years
- Forehead advertising
- Sandwich board
- Chindon'ya - traditional walking advertisements in Japan
