= AirSage =

- Company type: Private
- Industry: Telecommunications
- Founded: 2000
- Founder: Cy Smith
- Headquarters: Atlanta, Georgia
- Area served: United States
- Key people: Cy Smith (founder); Michael Cascone (president and CEO)
- Number of employees: 11
- Website: airsage.com

AirSage is an American telecommunications company that specializes in collecting and analyzing anonymous location data, such as cell phone and GPS data, to identify patterns. It does so by tracking mobile phone data using patented technology to capture and analyze mobile phone signal tower data, primarily for the purposes of aiding transportation planning and traffic reporting. It currently works with the out-of-home advertising startup Vistar, which uses AirSage's cell phone data to create a map of consumer behavior in the United States.

== History ==
AirSage was established in 2000 by Cy Smith, and is based in Atlanta, Georgia. It later developed a technology to use anonymized cell phone data as "traffic probes" to monitor traffic patterns. The company's first client to use their mobile-phone based traffic monitoring technology was the Virginia Department of Transportation, which began using it in the summer of 2005. Later that year, the company signed an agreement with the Georgia Department of Transportation (GDOT) to provide the agency with the same technology; the GDOT began using it in early 2006. Later in 2006, AirSage partnered with Sprint Nextel Corp. to offer the same service to Sprint's government subscribers in real time.

In 2017, the company announced that Michael Cascone would become its new president and CEO.
