= Restaurant media =

Form of advertising

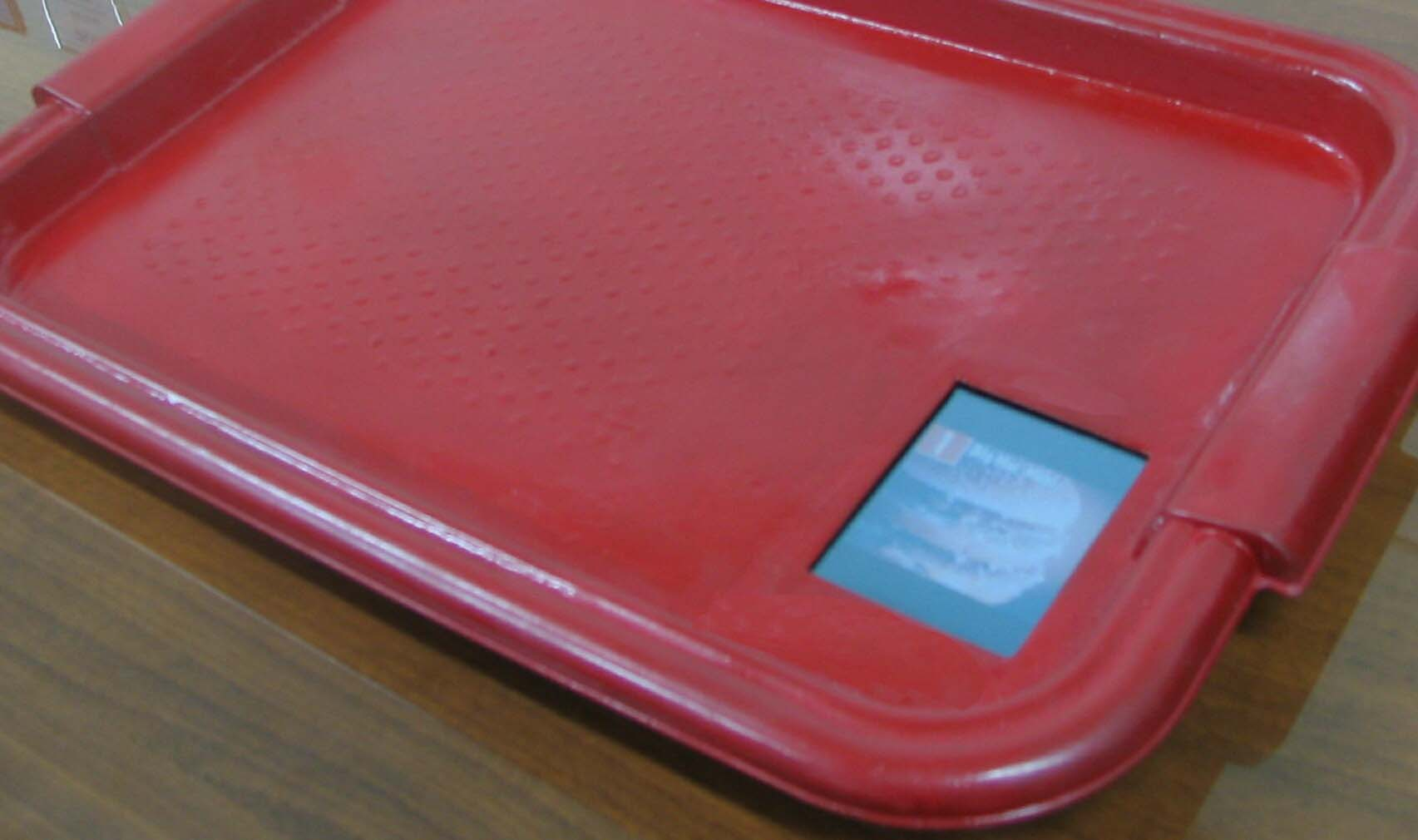
Fast food restaurant multimedia tray

Restaurant media is an emerging form of retail media advertising used in cafeterias, fast food and family restaurants and diners and that reaches consumers while they dine.

For decades most fast food restaurant chains employed various in-store advertising media such as billboards, posters and paper tray covers and these media are rapidly being replaced by digital signage. The concept of delivering multimedia content to customers of fast food restaurants and food courts emerged in the early 1990s and became increasingly popular in recent years. Burger King and Tim Hortons were among the first fast food restaurant chains to deploy digital signage projects involving plasma displays, LCD panels, self-service interactive kiosks in their restaurants.

== Overview ==
- Plasma displays and liquid crystal display panels: Flat panel are the most common digital signage or narrowcasting vehicles and are commonly located at or above the food service counter. This form of retail media usually attracts visitor attention with custom programming and helps customer make the best product selection. In some cases this is used for third-party advertising.
- Interactive kiosks: Some fast food restaurants have deployed interactive kiosks, allowing customers to make purchase of food or third-party products while being exposed to restaurant or third-party advertising.
- Interactive table-top displays. The use of table-top displays is emerging in mainly full-service restaurants providing customers with the ability to call the waiter, order menu items online, access Internet, television and custom restaurant programming.
- Interactive multimedia food service trays: One of the major recent breakthroughs in restaurant media was invented in late 2006 by Canadian entrepreneurs and is currently being evaluated for launch by major fast food restaurant chains.
- Gaming corners: In order to better target the youth segment and to generate additional revenue from third-party sponsorship, several restaurant chains are launching multimedia gaming corners. McDonald's and Burger King in certain regions installed video game console systems.
- Internet access outlets: Internet access points are becoming popular in cafeterias, shopping malls and full-service restaurants and are generally used to attract customers to the restaurant as well as expose them to third-party advertising.
- Interactive fast food ordering systems: To facilitate for a large group of take-out customers and to improve service of eat-in customers during peak times, many restaurants deployed touch screen ordering systems usually located at the entrance to the restaurant or drive-through area.
- Table Top Ordering Systems: This is a new technology trend that enables patrons to view menu, place orders, play games and pay at the table as well. These table top systems are being at Applebees, Olive Garden and lot of other chain restaurants.

== Trends ==
Strong competition will also continue among food service players as they attempt to capture business from these time starved consumers.

Recent industry analysis indicates that restaurant media in 2025 continues to expand through digital-first channels, with social platforms, online discovery tools, and visual content playing a central role in how consumers choose where to dine.

McDonald's announced a renovation program aimed at redesigning many of its restaurants. The new format includes features such as leather seating, television screens and wireless internet access. According to the company, the redesigned restaurants are intended to accommodate different types of customer activity through designated fast, social and extended-stay areas. Reports at the time indicated that some renovated locations experienced increases in customer traffic and sales. Similar initiatives by major food-service companies included menu changes and restaurant redesigns intended to enhance the customer experience. McDonald's has begun a $5 billion renovation project to try to encourage patrons to linger longer in their restaurants. This demonstrates two things. One, traditional "fast food" restaurants are looking for ways to keep customers in the store longer in an attempt to generate more purchases. And two, the old value proposition behind fast food: deliver a meal cheaply and quickly is also changing.

== Consumer trends ==
The U.S. saw an increase in the number of households from the period of 1990-2005 yet it also experienced a decline in its population. This resulted in a net decrease in the number of people per household, fuelled mainly by single person household growth (an increase over the period of 30%) as well as two-person household growth (an increase over the period of 25%). Full-service and fast food restaurants will continue to benefit from this trend, as single and two person households find it more economical to eat meals out rather than prepare them at home. A research study by Ipsos-Insight also found that 32% of Americans currently eat at restaurants at least a few days a week and 61% do so at least once a week.

Disposable incomes in the U.S. are predicted to increase between 2005 and 2010, as a result of continued growth in the number of dual income households. This is a favorable trend for the food service industry for two reasons. First, an increase in the number of dual income households means that there is increasing time pressure on the household and a willingness to seek out convenient dining options. Second, increased disposable income typically indicates people will spend more in restaurants. This dual income segment also continually looks for an appealing atmosphere which allows them to dine with friends and family.

== Technology trends ==
Attempts have been made by several companies to digitize the materials on the restaurant tray cover and enhance the consumer experience by integrating multimedia devices into the fast food trays. In 2006, the manufacturer of multimedia tablets called Mediox showcased the first prototypes of multimedia-enabled trays. Regular consumer tablets and multimedia phones quickly replaced the multimedia food trays and most of the traditional and quick service restaurants now focus on delivering content via in-store wall-mounted and cash register TVs. McDonald's has chosen to use the self-ordering kiosks as a way of showing their customers a wider range of choices. Just like how online shopping works by making it easy to "add" more items to the basket, so too do the self-ordering kiosks. Standard restaurants have begun to embrace digital menus. Instead of the standard paper menu, some restaurants are beginning to use a tablet type device in order to allow the customer to be more engaging with the menu and ultimately lead to a more satisfied choice. Another technology that has advanced from a paper form into a digital one is loyalty schemes. The classic stamp cards are starting to be removed and replaced with a transaction based loyalty scheme that is linked to the consumers EFTPOS or credit card. Every time the card is used to make a purchase from the restaurant points are awarded to an online account, which can be cashed in for free items off the menu.

Recent industry studies in 2025 also highlight how digital-first media, short-form video, and discovery platforms are influencing restaurant technology adoption, particularly in markets like the Middle East.

Restaurants have also indulged in the mobile app market. Fast food companies such as Pizza Hut and Dominoes are among the many restaurants that offer an app designed for on the go, easy ordering. This idea allows for efficiency and lower wait times for busy customers who need a pit stop meal. Having this data on one's phone also allows the app to update so that the customers more frequently purchased items show up faster, which along with online payments being possible through the app, makes it even simpler for the consumer to choose, order, pay for and enjoy the food.

== The teen segment ==
There are approximately 73 million people under the age of 18 in the United States, representing a significant future consumer demographic. Having grown up with widespread access to technology and the internet, many young people are accustomed to receiving information quickly and through multiple digital channels. As a result, marketers face increasing challenges in reaching this audience, which is often exposed to targeted advertising from an early age and has become more selective about the content it engages with. Young consumers are also frequently among the early adopters of new technologies, with trends in gaming, personal computing, internet usage, and mobile devices playing an important role in their daily lives.

According to a report from Forrester Research, promotions that work well with teens include advergames, instant-win games, online coupons, streaming video ads and cell phone promotions. Restaurant media that encompasses video ads and other multimedia content and encourages interactive game playing will effectively capture the attention of this segment.

== Competition in the food service industry ==
Competition in the food service segment has increased as restaurants adopts menu innovations and new services in order to increase customers. Competitors who have not kept up through menu innovation or by offering new services have felt the strongest pressure competitively. Restaurants that demonstrate innovation and creativity to improve convenience and service will be those that achieve differentiation from competitors. Moreover, those restaurants that are able to provide new concepts that can appeal to a wider variety of customers will also realize increased returns.

Social media is among the fastest growing media platforms in the modern era. Restaurants have jumped onto the social media buzz in a unique and effective way. There are many apps available to download that help restaurants attract new customers and get their name out to the public. One type of app that has revolutionised restaurant to consumer engagement is online search and discovery platforms such as Zomato and Yelp. What Zomato and Yelp do is they sell an advertising platform to the restaurant, which in turn allows users of the app to search for restaurants of a certain type with in a small radius of their location. The use of this type of media allows restaurants to directly advertise to a very specific target audience, as customers refine their searches to find a specific restaurant to suit their needs. Through signing up for social medias such as Zomato and Yelp, the restaurant is also telling the customers that they are confident in the quality of their product as the app allows customers to place reviews on their experience at the restaurant . In 2009, 70% of all restaurants were listed on Yelp. A positive correlation exists between the revenues of restaurants and their online reviews.

Online review platforms are not the only form of social media that has revolutionised the restaurant industry. Even the large social medias such as Facebook and Twitter have had a huge impact on the industry. An example of this was KFC's release of the Double Down burger. Whether the topic of discussion was positive or negative regarding the Double Down, conversations through Facebook and Twitter especially had a greater success of reaching consumers than any advertising campaign for the burger did. The hype and controversy over the burger in May 2011 made it the most desired item on the Kentucky Fried Chicken menu. The idea of using a social media in the restaurants advantage is to get people talking about a restaurant or a menu item. This is essentially free advertising. Not only is it free, but also 92% of all consumers believe recommendations from friends and family over any advertising campaign. Restaurants want to utilize the opportunity for free advertising via Facebook, as it is a platform that can be constantly updated with new items, deals or even new store locations. Photos and videos are a far more effective advertising medium, which makes Facebook a perfect media to use for advertising product.
