= Outdoor advertising =

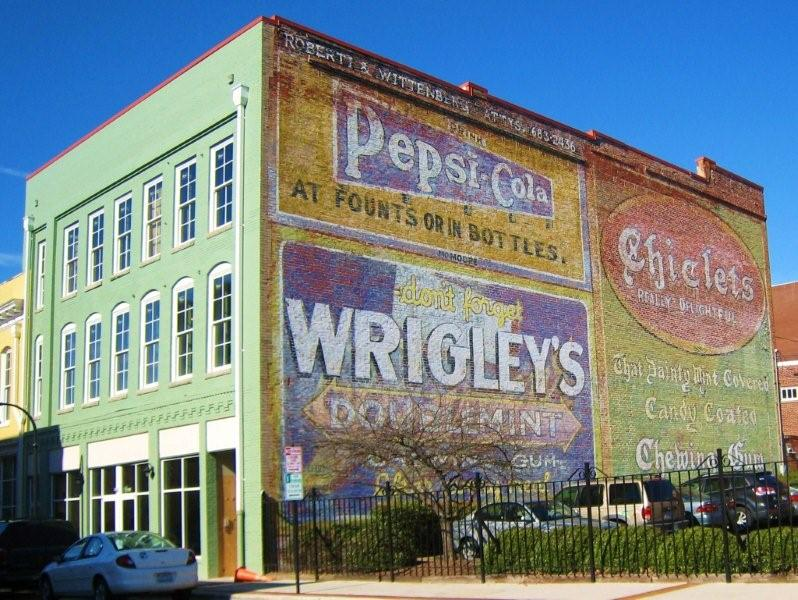
Faded wall adverts for Pepsi Cola, Chiclets and Wrigley's gum, in Durham, North Carolina

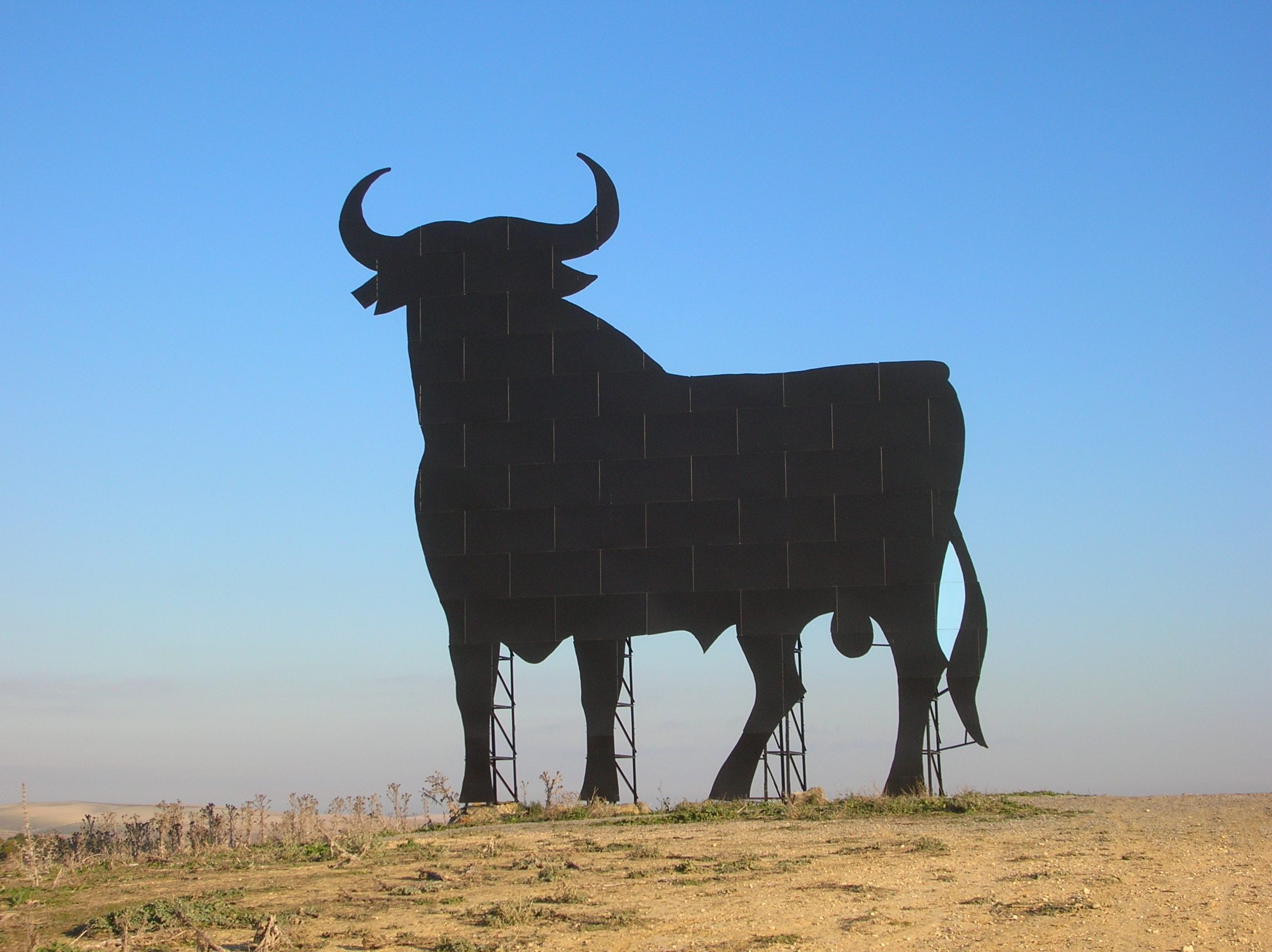
The Osborne bull was originally installed as an outdoor advertisement for Brandy de Jerez and later became an unofficial cultural symbol of Spain.

Outdoor advertising, also known as out-of-home advertising (OOH), refers to advertising displayed in public spaces and environments outside private homes. It includes communication formats designed to reach people while they are moving through cities, transportation systems, commercial districts, and shared public areas.

Outdoor advertising is one of the oldest forms of mass communication and today encompasses both traditional physical media and digitally connected advertising networks. Contemporary OOH systems combine urban infrastructure, visual communication, mobility patterns, and data-driven media planning.

The sector is commonly divided into four main categories:

- Billboards and large-format displays
- Street furniture advertising
- Transit advertising
- Alternative and experiential media

The industry also distinguishes between traditional static advertising and digital out-of-home advertising (DOOH), which uses digital screens, dynamic content, and programmatic media buying systems.

== Digital ==
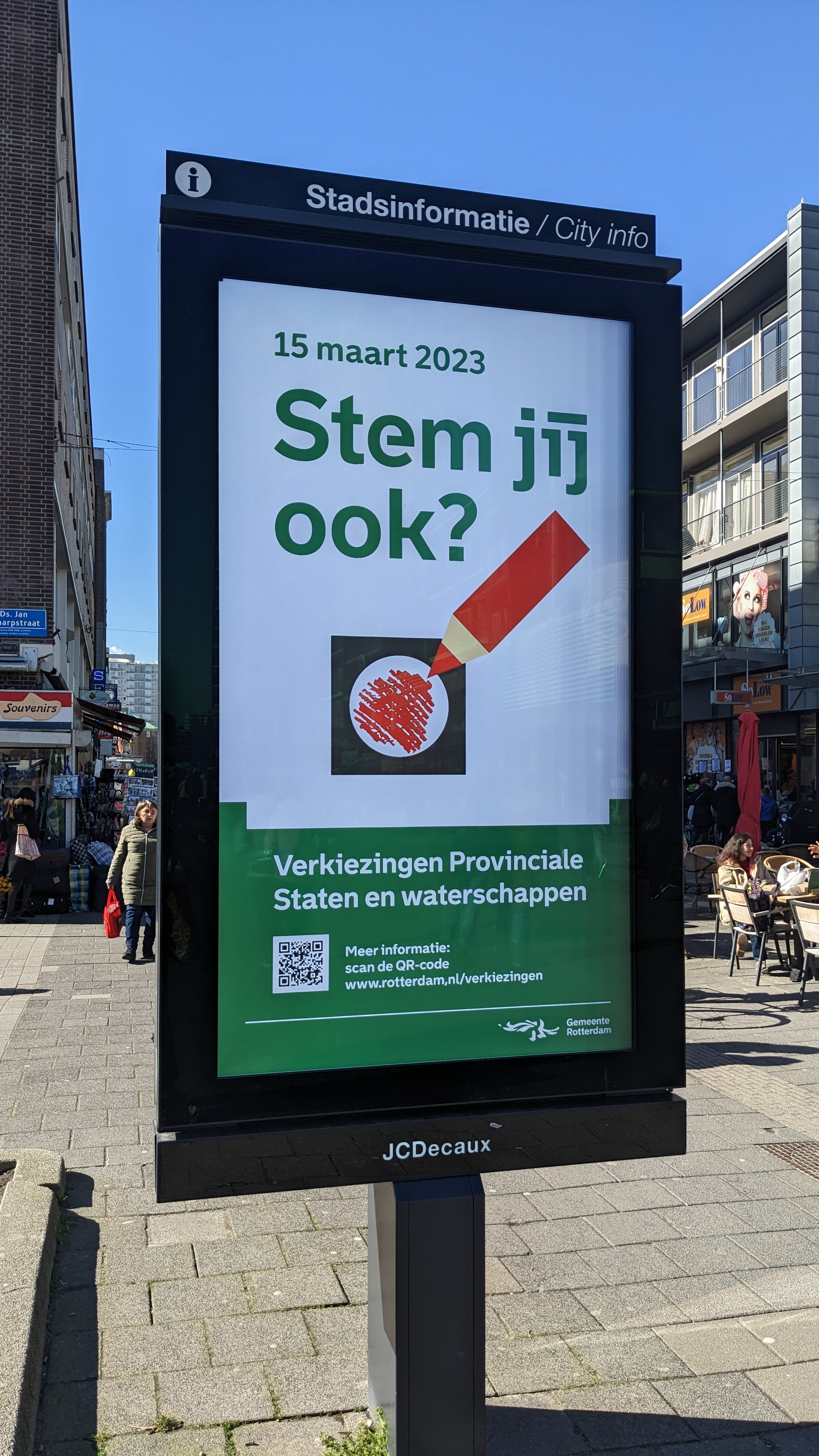
Digital outdoor advertisement display placed by JCDecaux, displaying an advertisement for the Provincial council election in the Netherlands

Digital out-of-home advertising (DOOH) refers to the use of digital screens and connected display systems in public environments. DOOH networks can distribute dynamic content across multiple locations simultaneously and may integrate real-time data, scheduling systems, audience analytics, and programmatic advertising technologies.

DOOH media are commonly installed in transportation hubs, shopping centers, streets, airports, sports venues, and retail environments.

Programmatic DOOH platforms allow advertisers to purchase advertising space automatically based on audience profiles, geographic areas, time schedules, weather conditions, or mobility data.

== Traditional formats ==
Traditional out-of-home advertising refers to static advertising media distributed across physical public spaces. Examples include:

- Aerial advertising includes towing banners via fixed-wing aircraft as well as the use of blimps and other airborne inflatables above beaches, events, and traffic corridors.
- Billboards are large-format advertising structures typically located in highly visible, high-traffic areas such as expressways, arterial roads, and major intersections.
- Bus advertising includes advertisements placed directly on buses as well as on associated transit infrastructure such as shelters and benches.
- Digital billboards are electronic display systems capable of showing changing advertising content in real time.
- Mobile billboards are portable advertising structures designed to be moved between locations as needed. Some formats are mounted on vehicles or trailers and may support temporary digital or projection-based installations.
- Walking billboards are portable advertising displays carried by individuals in public spaces, often used for localized promotional campaigns.

Space advertising, using arrays of small satellites that reflect sunlight, has also been evaluated experimentally by researchers at the Skolkovo Institute of Science and Technology.

== Regulations ==
Outdoor advertising is regulated by national, regional, and municipal authorities in most countries. Regulations commonly address:

- Placement and dimensions of advertising structures
- Road safety and visibility
- Illumination levels
- Historic and environmental protection zones
- Digital display technologies
- Public space management

Regulatory approaches vary significantly between countries and cities, ranging from permissive commercial systems to strong restrictions intended to preserve landscape quality or reduce visual clutter.

Outdoor advertising infrastructure is often integrated into transportation systems and public services through partnerships between municipalities and private operators. In many cities, advertising revenue contributes to the maintenance of bus shelters, public information systems, bicycle-sharing stations, and other forms of urban furniture.

=== United States ===
In the United States, outdoor advertising is regulated at federal, state, and local levels. The regulatory framework established by the federal Highway Beautification Act of 1965 requires most billboards along interstate and federal highways to be located in commercial or industrial areas.

Billboard permits are generally issued by state and local authorities. Several states, including Vermont, Hawaii, Maine, and Alaska, prohibit most billboard advertising.

Most states also regulate digital billboards, including restrictions on animation, scrolling, brightness, and image transition frequency. In 2007, the Federal Highway Administration (FHWA) issued guidance regarding digital billboard regulation.

=== Brazil ===
São Paulo, Brazil, introduced the "Clean City Law" (Lei Cidade Limpa) in 2006, establishing one of the world's most extensive restrictions on outdoor advertising. The regulation required the removal of thousands of billboards, banners, and oversized commercial signs throughout the city.

The initiative became an internationally discussed example of urban visual regulation and public space management.

=== Switzerland ===
Some Swiss municipalities have introduced restrictions on outdoor advertising in response to concerns regarding visual pollution and landscape preservation. The municipality of Vernier banned certain forms of outdoor advertising in public space.

=== Finland ===
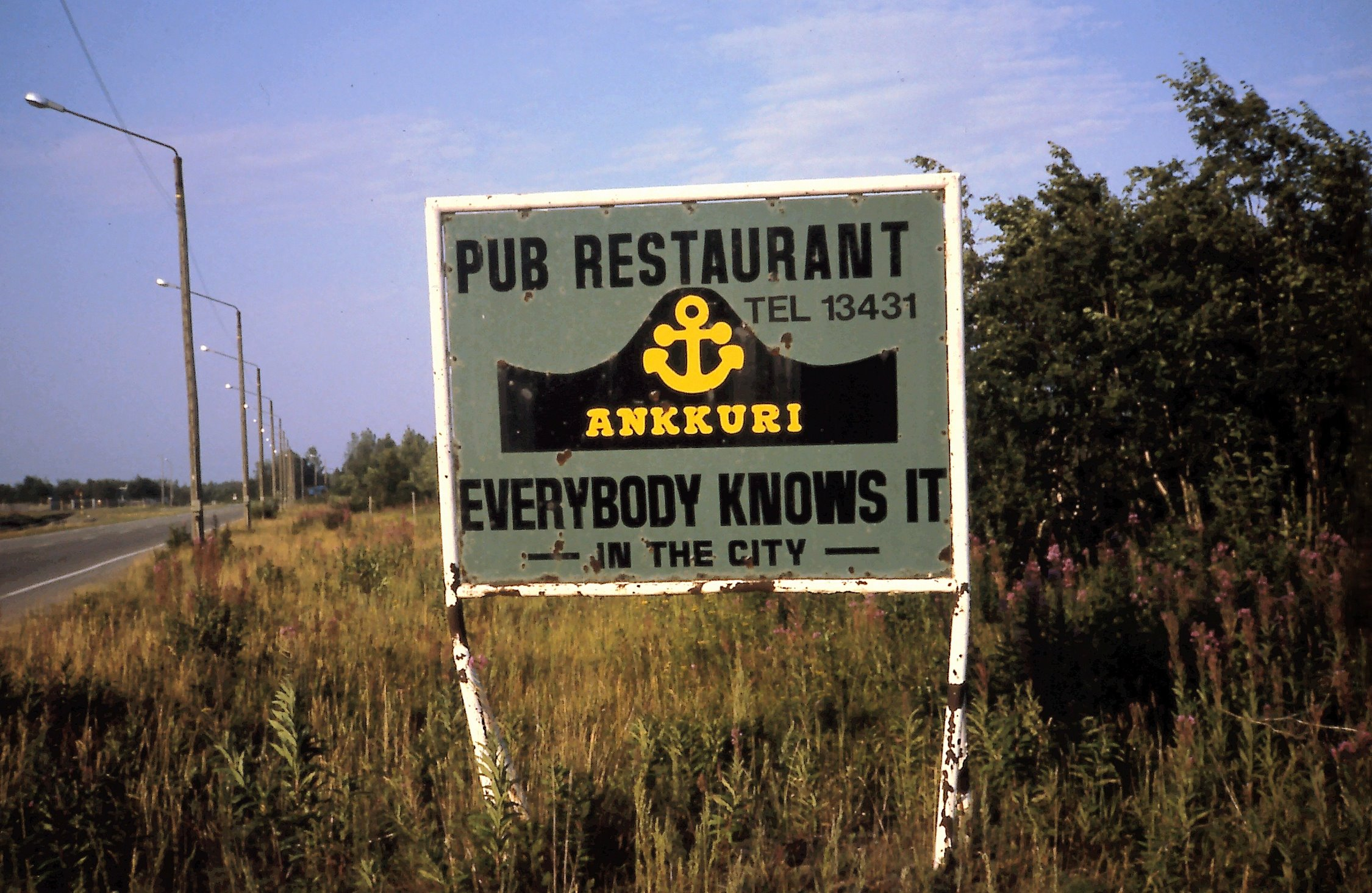
A roadside advertisement for a restaurant in Kemi in 1989.

Outdoor advertising in Finland is regulated through municipal permits and road safety legislation. Public debate has focused on accessibility in pedestrian areas, landscape protection, and the environmental impact of illuminated advertising displays.

In 2024, the Supreme Administrative Court of Finland confirmed a ruling concerning illuminated advertising displays located at the intersection of Runeberginkatu and Mannerheimintie in Helsinki.

== See also ==
- Advertising management
- Barn advertisement
- Driven media
- Electronic signage
- Fleet media
- Helicopter banner
- Human billboard
- Integrated marketing communications
- Kiosk software
- Marketing communications
- Neon signage
- Point of sale display
- Promotion (marketing)
- School bus advertising
- Restaurant media
- Retail media
- Rotulo
- Sandwich board
- Searchlight
- Skywriting
- Street furniture
- Street marketing
- Transit media
- Truckside advertisement
- Unipole sign
- Vinyl banners
- Wrap advertising
