= Sign painting =

Drawing letters on boards or buildings to convey a message

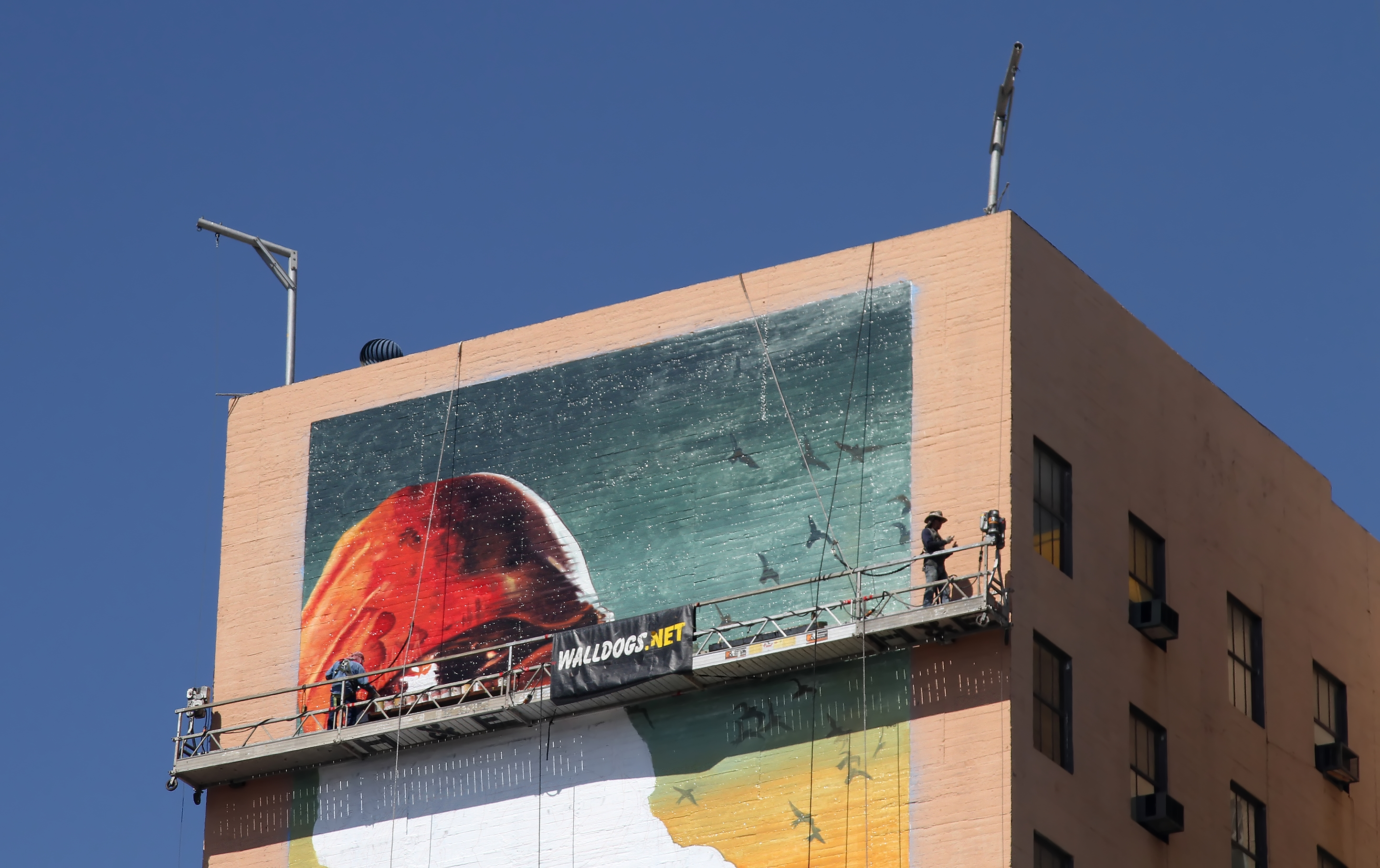
Sign painters create a new sign on the walls of the Hotel Figueroa in Los Angeles, California

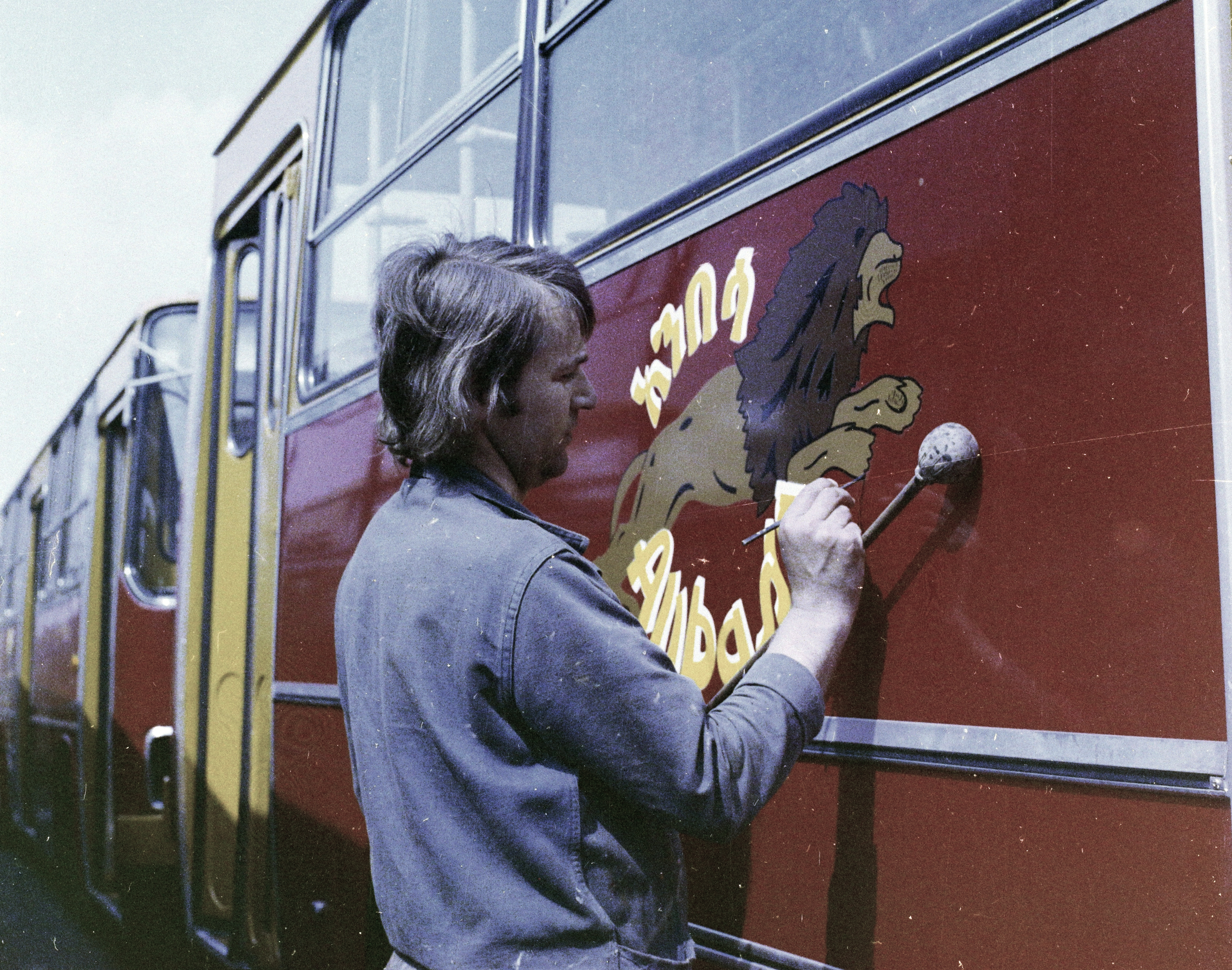
A man painting a logo on a bus in Budapest

Sign painting is the craft of painting lettered signs on buildings, billboards or signboards, for promoting, announcing, or identifying products, services and events. Sign painting artisans are signwriters, although in North America they are usually referred to as sign painters.

== History ==
Signwriters often learned the craft through apprenticeship or trade school, although many early sign painters were self-taught. The Sign Graphics program at the Los Angeles Trade Technical College is the last remaining sign painting program in the United States.

Skillful manipulation of a lettering brush can take years to develop.

In the 1980s, with the advent of computer printing on vinyl, traditional hand-lettering faced stiff competition. Interest in the craft waned during the 1980s and 90s, but hand-lettering and traditional sign painting have experienced a resurgence in popularity in recent years.

The 2012 book and documentary, Sign Painters by Faythe Levine and Sam Macon, chronicles the historical changes and current state of the sign painting industry through personal interviews with contemporary sign painters.

Old painted signs which fade but remain visible are known as ghost signs.

== Techniques ==
There are a number of other associated skills and techniques as well, including gold leafing (surface and glass), carving (in various mediums), glue-glass chipping, stencilling, and silk-screening.

== Bibliography ==
- Turvey, Lisa (April 2012). "An American Language". Artforum International. 50: 218–9.
- Swezy, Tim (February 25, 2014). "One Shot Seen 'Round the World: A Survey of Sign Painting on the Internet (Part of AIGA Raleigh - the oldest and largest professional organization for Design)". AIGA Raleigh. Retrieved April 21, 2020.
- Childs, Mark C. (2016). The Zeon files : art and design of historic Route 66 signs. Babcock, Ellen D., 1957-. Albuquerque: University of New Mexico Press. ISBN 978-0-8263-5603-1. OCLC 944156236.
- Auer, Michael (1991). The Preservation of Historic Signs. Washington, D.C: U.S. Department of the Interior, National Park Service, Cultural Resources, Preservation Assistance.
- Jakle, John A. (2004). Signs in America's auto age : signatures of landscape and place. Sculle, Keith A. Iowa City: University of Iowa Press. ISBN 1-58729-482-6. OCLC 66385186.

== See also ==
- Signwriter
- Calligraphy
- Rotulo
