= Rotulo =

Rótulo (Spanish: "sign" or "title") refers to hand-painted signs on buildings that describe their function or serve as an advertisement, used in Latin America, and Mexico in particular. These signs are painted by specialized artisans and are produced in sessions over the course of days.

While becoming less prevalent in higher income areas, they continue to be viable forms of commercial art in working and middle-class neighborhoods in Latin America. As street art they are connected with the Mexican Muralism movement from the 1930s but predate it and represent a unique branch of the hand-painted sign art of the nineteenth century.

== Usage ==
Rotulos are used extensively by small business and some major corporations. They are produced in many sizes and vary in levels of detail. The detail used is particular to the artist commissioned to produce the rotulo and is also dependent on the audience the company is intending to target.

The amount of time required to produce each rotulo depends on the amount of detail requested by the company. On average it can take multiple days to complete a finished rotulo.

== See also ==
- Mega event advertising
- Truckside advertisement
- Out-of-home advertising
