= Electronic signage =

Display medium

Electronic signage (also called electronic signs or electronic displays) are illuminant advertising media in the signage industry. Major electronic signage include fluorescent signs, HID (high intensity displays), incandescent signs, LED signs, and neon signs. Besides, LED signs and HID are so-called digital signage.

== Status ==
Electronic signs may be used indoors or outdoors. The display technologies are varied and changing quickly. Because of new display technologies, electronic signs are able to present more clear, colorful, and vivid images. Animated electronic signs gradually replace traditional static signs and increasingly take signage market share.

=== Average percentage of various signs usage ===
Type of Signage	2001	2002	2003
Fluorescent	47.3%	46.9%	46.3%
HID (High Intensity Display)	1.9%	2.4%	2.0%
Incandescent	2.0%	1.9%	1.8%
LED	3.9%	6.2%	7.2%
Neon	43.0%	41.3%	41.7%
Others	1.9%	1.2%	0.9%

== Regulation (USA) ==
It is not difficult to have an electronic sign for your business; however, it is not simple to get a permit to install an electronic sign. There are two terms for the advertising industry, off-premises advertising device and on-premises advertising device. Usually, there are different regulatory and zoning set up by different cities for different types of advertising media.

=== Results of State Statutory Review ===
Prohibitions on Signs...	...with red, flashing, intermittent, or moving lights, unless it is a public service display	...that are not sufficiently shielded to prevent beams or rays of light from causing a glare or vision impairment that affects driver vision	...that are placed so as to obscure or interfere with traffic control devices	...that are so illuminated as to obscure or interfere with traffic control devices	...located on interstate or primary highway outside of zoning authority of incorporated cities within 500 ft of an interchange or intersection at grade or safety roadside rest area	...other state highway says 300 ft limit	...directional signs may not be located within 200 ft of an interstate, or intersection at grade along the interstate system or other freeway, or within 2,000 ft of a rest or scenic area or parkland	...timing limit
Alabama	Yes	Yes	Yes	Yes	Yes		Yes	
Alaska								
Arizona	Yes	Yes		Yes			Yes	
Arkansas	Yes	Yes		Yes	Yes		Yes	
California	Yes	Yes		Yes	Yes	Yes	Yes	4 sec-message display, 1 sec-message change
Colorado NOTE: prohibits signs which have a moveable advertising face permitting any change in sign content or message	Yes	Yes	Yes	Yes	Yes	Yes	Yes	
Delaware	Yes	Yes		Yes	Yes	Yes	Yes	
Florida	Yes			Yes	1,500 ft on interstate; 1,000 ft on federal aid primary highway			
Georgia NOTE: prohibits signs with moving orcertain conditions are met	Yes	Yes		Yes	Yes	Yes	Yes	Message fixed for at least 10 sec, message changed in 3 sec or less, 5,000 ft spacing, default freezing sign if malfunction occurs
Hawaii								
Idaho NOTE: adds in blue lights	Yes	Yes		Yes	Yes between displays on interstate or primary highway or public/scenic area; 1,000 ft from an interchange or rest area		Yes	Exposure time is long enough at maximum speed limit for sign message to be readable and comprehensible
Illinois	Yes	Yes	Yes	Yes	Yes		Yes	
Iowa NOTE: prohibits animated or moving parts in a sign	Yes	Yes		Yes	Yes	Yes		Tri-vision signs 4 sec minimum display, 2 sec for transition
Indiana NOTE: prohibits animated or moving parts	Yes	Yes		Yes	Yes	Yes	Yes	
Kansas	Yes	Yes	Yes	Yes			Yes	
Kentucky NOTE: prohibits animation and movement except for movement on and off of the sign	Yes	Yes	Yes	Yes		Yes		Total message displayed within 10 sec, with each segment having a display time of 2 sec including change time
Louisiana NOTE: statute obtained does not have information on restrictions								Signs must be readily viewed for a time of 5 sec from the roadway at posted speed limit
Maine								
Michigan	Yes	Yes		Yes	Yes	Yes	Yes	
Massachusetts NOTE: prohibitions appear to be adopted by reference incorporating federal regulations								Not more than 3 rotating or alternate messages may be displayed on a sign
Minnesota	Yes	Yes		Yes	Yes			
Mississippi	Yes	Yes	Yes	Yes	Yes	Yes, 350 ft		
Missouri	Yes	Yes	Yes	Yes	Yes	Yes		
Montana	Yes	Yes		Yes			Yes	
New Hampshire NOTE: statute has no language on any prohibitions or restrictions								
Nebraska	Yes	Yes	Yes					
Nevada	Yes	Yes		Yes	Yes	Yes		Minimum display time of 6 sec, maximum change interval of 3 sec
New Mexico NOTE: prohibits animation or moving parts	Yes	Yes	Yes	Yes	Yes		Yes	
New Jersey NOTE: prohibits animation and moving parts	Yes	Yes	Yes	Yes	Yes		Yes	Minimum message time of 8 sec, maximum change time of 2 sec
New York NOTE: prohibits animation or moving parts except for public service announcement	Yes	Yes	Yes	Yes	Yes	Yes		
North Carolina	Yes	Yes		Yes	Yes	Yes		
North Dakota	Yes	Yes			Yes	Yes	Yes	
Ohio NOTE: no statutory information obtained								
Oklahoma	Yes	Yes		Yes				
Oregon	Yes	Yes	Yes				Yes	
Pennsylvania	Yes	Yes		Yes	Yes	Yes	Yes	
Rhode Island NOTE: prohibits animation and moving parts		Yes	Yes		Yes, 750 ft	Yes, 250 ft		
South Carolina	Yes	Yes			Yes	Yes	Yes	Viewing time 5 sec from roadside when traveling at speed limit
Tennessee	Yes	Yes		Yes	Yes, 1,000 ft	Yes, 500 ft	Yes	
Texas NOTE: no statutory literature included in file								
Vermont								
Virginia	Yes	Yes		Yes	Yes		Yes	
Washington NOTE: prohibits animation and moving parts	Yes	Yes	Yes					If sign change exceed 4 sec, turn sign off during change
Washington, DC								
West Virginia	Yes	Yes			Yes	Yes		Change time of 5 sec maximum without written approval
Wisconsin	Yes	Yes		Yes	Yes	Yes		
Wyoming	Yes	Yes	Yes		Yes	Yes	Yes	
Total of 42 states	36	36	15	29	28	21	22	

Note: 10 states prohibit animation or moving parts except for public service announcement

== Gallery ==
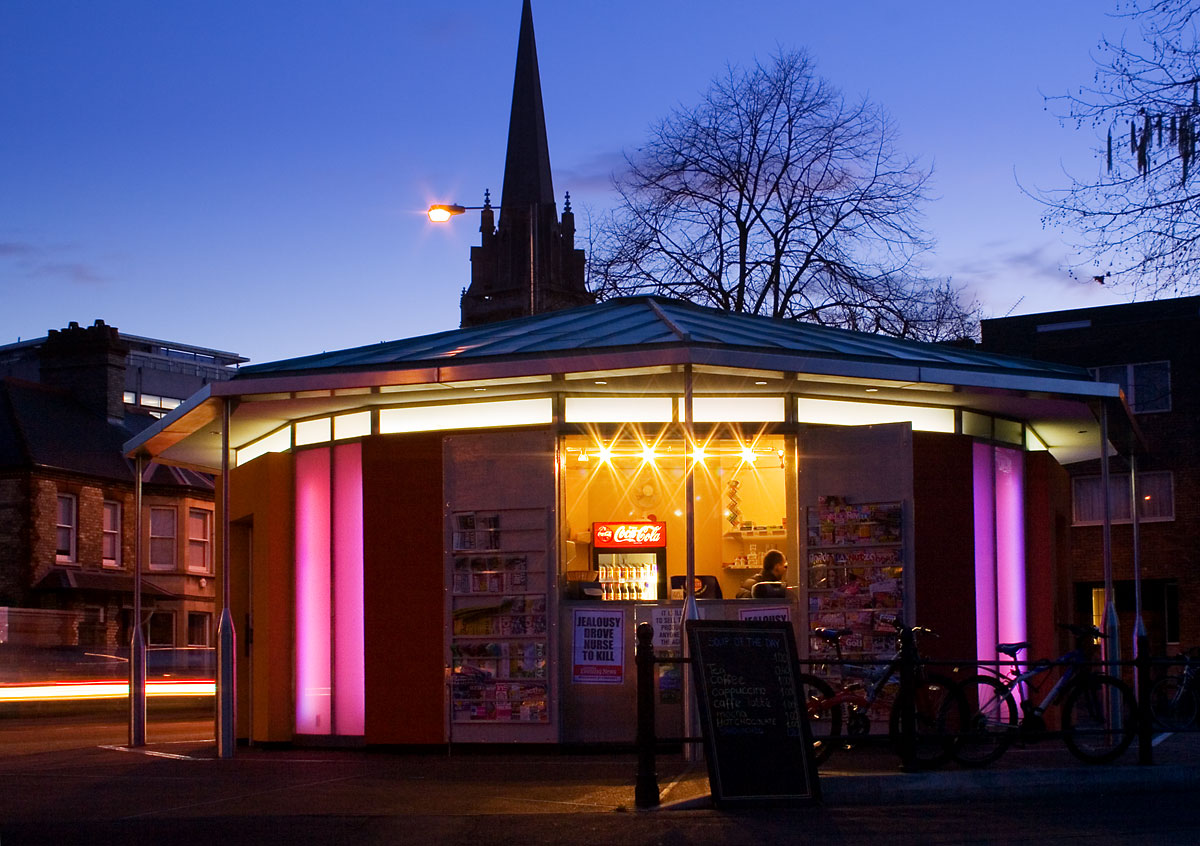
The coloured panels contain fluorescent lamps which gradually change colour between red, blue and green.

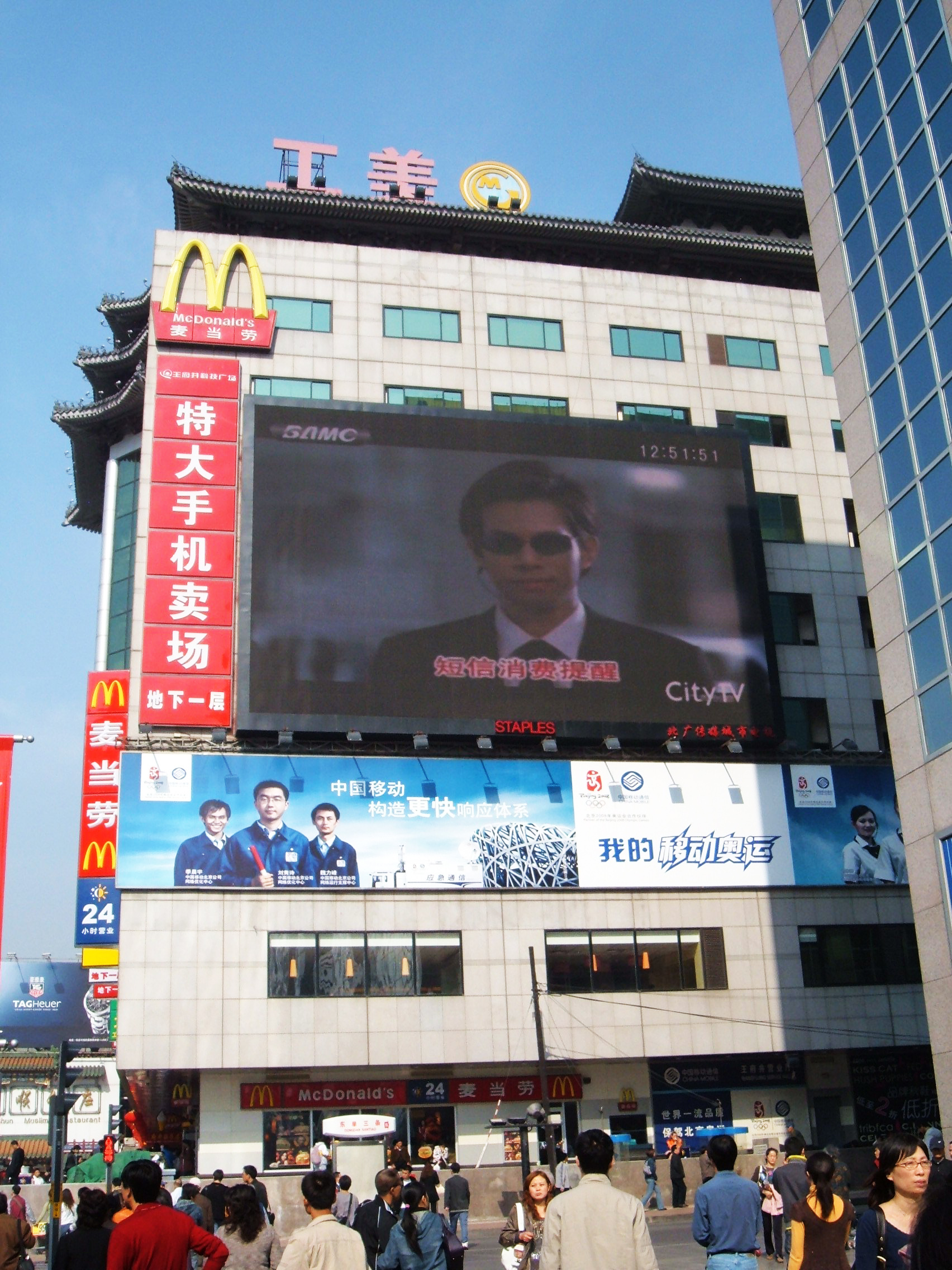
McDonald's on Wangfujing Dajie, in Beijing, PRC with giant advertising TV billboard.

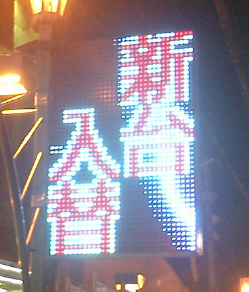
The LED electric light guide plate of the pachinko store.

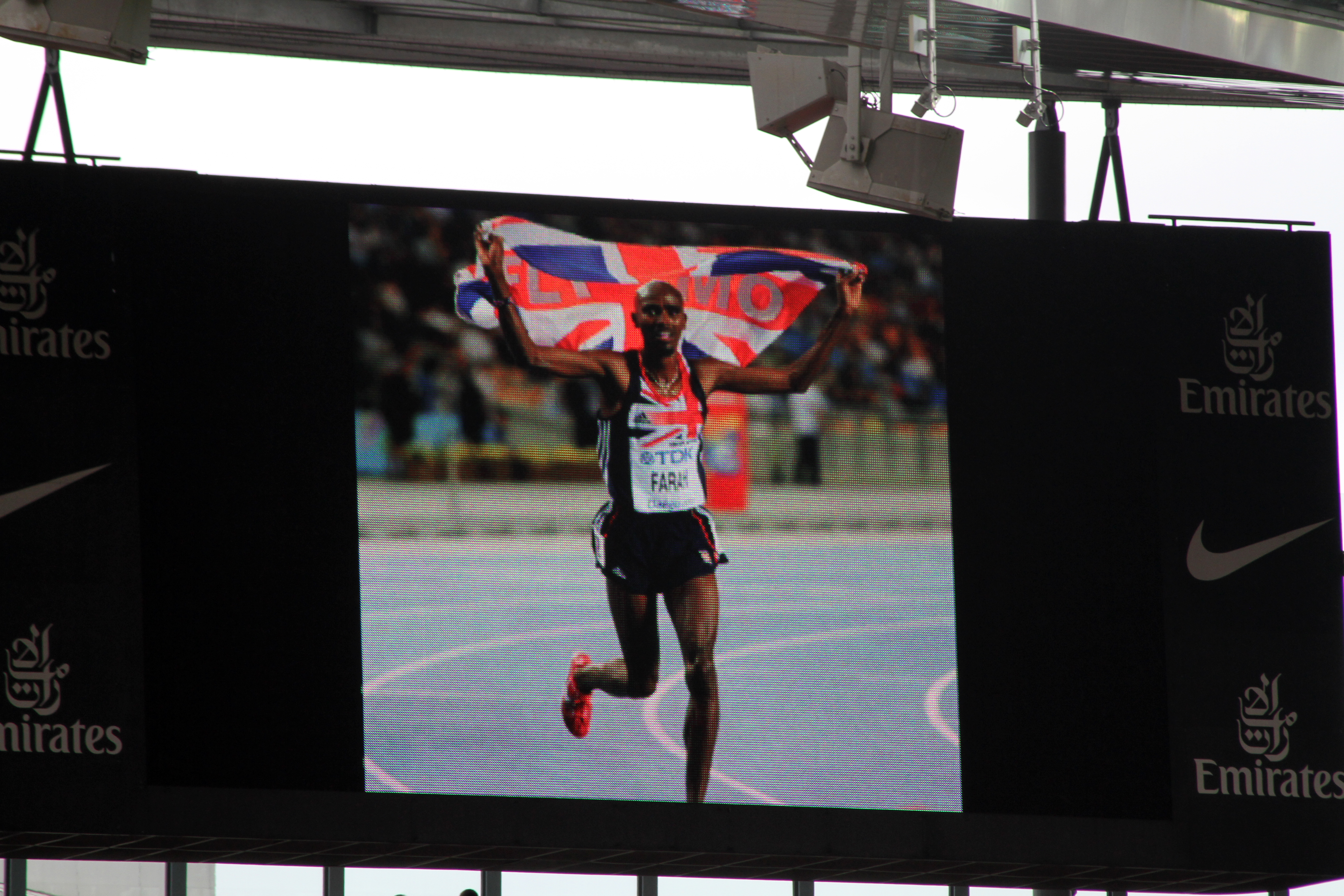
Mo Farah on a billboard.

== See also ==
- Advertising
- Billboard
- Digital signage
- Destination sign (used in public transport vehicles)
- Signage
- Out-of-home advertising
