= Signwriter =

Creator of prominent visual messages

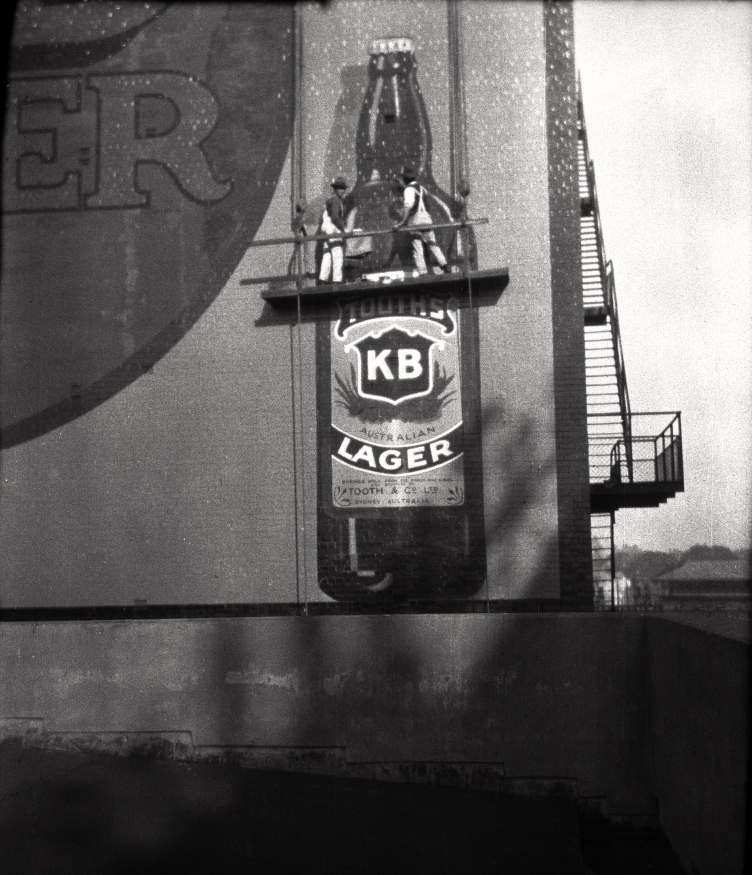
Signwriters painting a KB Lager advertisement on the side of a building in Australia

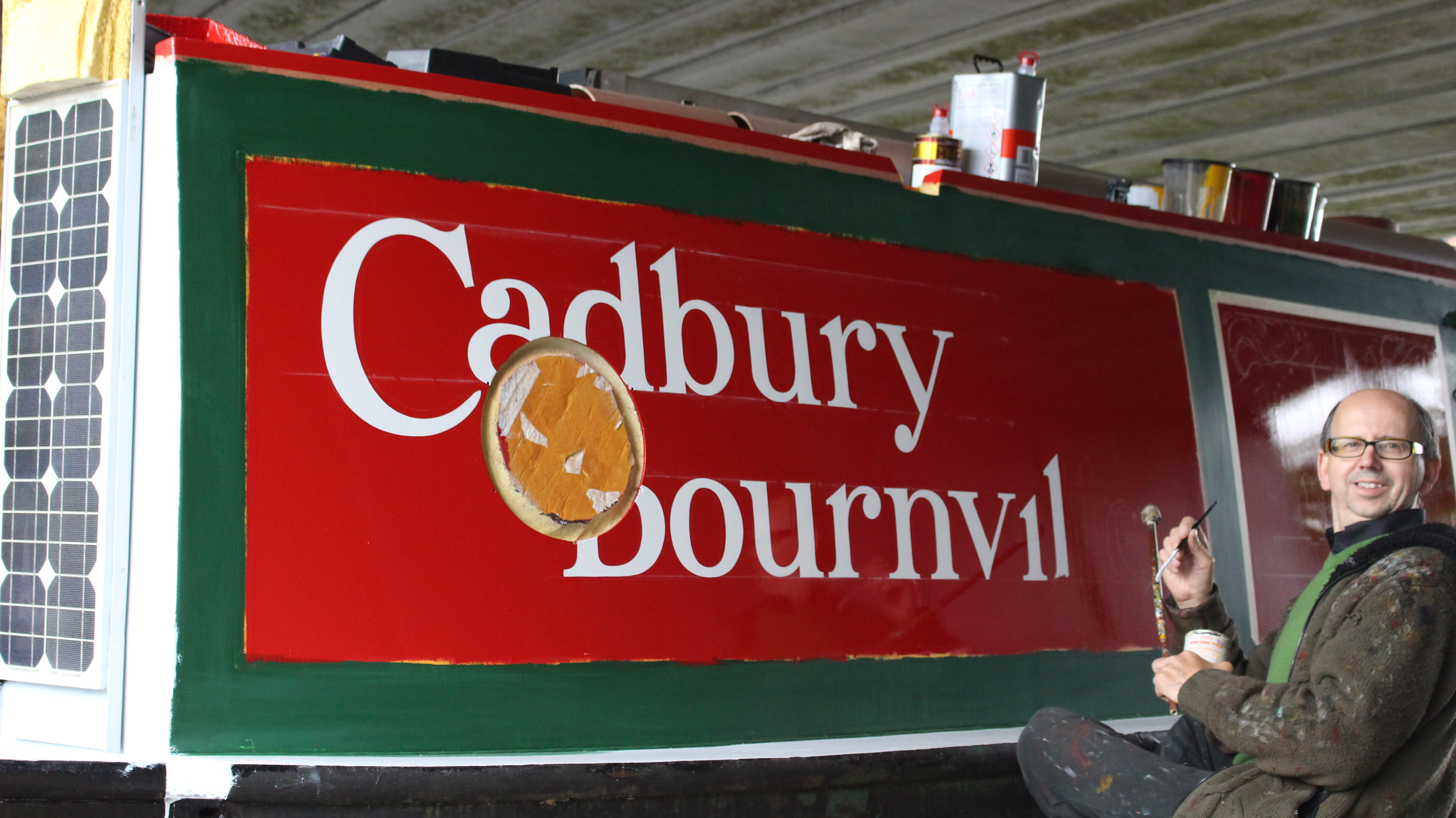
Canal narrowboat in England being signwritten

A signwriter designs, manufactures and installs signs, including advertising signs for shops, businesses and public facilities as well as signs for transport systems.

== Signwriting today ==
Traditional signwriters use methods closely related to those of their forebears in this craft and do not depend on technology - they are able to set out a sign with chalk and write it by eye in freehand. They do not rely on fonts and normally have their own individual lettering styles, yet also have the ability to render fonts closely to brand, as in architectural design briefs, for example.

Designs are often created by hand on the drawing board and later combined with CAD software for preliminary layout production. The final execution is made by hand using brushes known as quills and similar signwriting 'pencils' and chiseled brushes. Specialist enamels are also employed to fashion a long-lasting finish along with the traditional use of gold leaf.

Historically, signwriters drew or painted signs by hand using a variety of paint depending on the background i.e. enamel paint for vehicles and general signs, and water-based paints for short-term window signs.

The term "modern signwriters" is misleading, as most do not use the traditional brush as a method of application. Many use vinyl masking screens in order to replicate traditional signwriting. Modern print-based signage producers design and 'output' signs with the assistance of computer software and a range of equipment such as large format digital printers, plotters, cutters, flat bed routers and engraving machines.

Signwriting and signmakers may offer many different processes to present the same lettering or images in different media, such as banners, metal engraving, LED or neon signs, and LED display.

Signs created with large-format printers may use solvent inks, water-based inks, latex inks or ultraviolet-curable/cured inks. The last material is the most modern, and can be printed directly onto many different substrates such as wood, metal and plastic, adhesive-backed or non-adhesive films. Adhesive-backed films are then laminated to another substrate.

So called 'permanent' signage for use in shopfronts can be cut by machine or hand from acrylic or metal. However these deteriorate and lose pigmentation and surface polish after two to three years.

Many traditional signwriters point out that a painted sign, by contrast, grows more beautiful with age, eventually becoming what's known as a 'ghost sign' as it fades revealing grounds, surfaces, brushstrokes and undercoats.

== History ==
Signwriters were employed to paint signs for a wide variety of purposes. They required good hand-eye coordination as well as the ability to produce different styles of font, ornamentation and lettershapes.

== Bars, pubs and restaurants ==
Signwriting for these establishments is typically elaborately painted, cast in metal or gilded, for the latter sometimes also for the menu case. This is typically done by signage machine specialists or by visual (manual) artists and/or metalworkers.

== See also ==
- Muralist
- Sign painting
- Signage
- House painter and decorator
- Van lettering
