= Digital signage =

Sub-segment of electronic signage

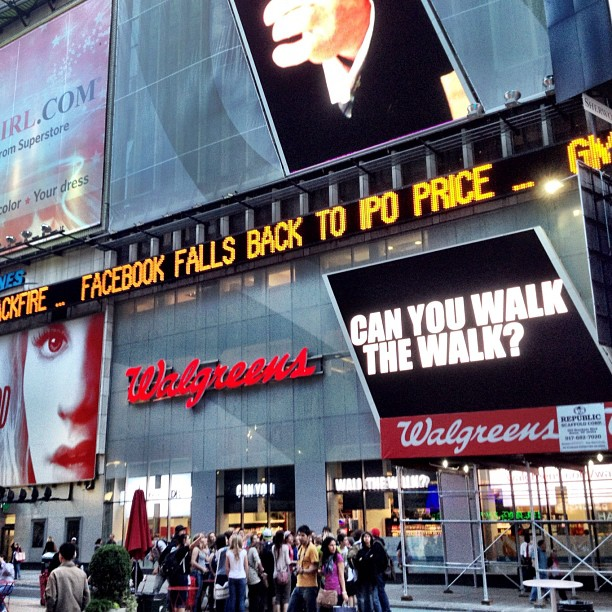
Digital signage on the side of a building reports stock prices. Dow Jones News Ticker, Times Square

Digital signage is a segment of electronic signage that uses digital display technologies to present multimedia content in both public and private environments. Content may include video, images, text, or interactive media and is typically displayed for purposes such as advertising, information dissemination, branding, or entertainment.

Digital signage systems can be either networked or standalone. Networked systems are managed through centralized content management systems (CMS), often cloud-based, enabling remote updates, scheduling, real-time data integration, and dynamic content delivery. These systems may also incorporate audience analytics, IoT sensors, or AI-driven personalization.

Standalone systems, by contrast, operate without a network connection. They rely on local media playback via USB drives, SD cards, or internal storage. These solutions are simpler and suitable for locations where connectivity is limited or content changes infrequently.

== Applications of digital signage ==
Digital signage is widely used in transportation hubs, retail stores, restaurants, corporate buildings, hotels, educational institutions, healthcare facilities, and public spaces.

One prominent application of digital signage is Digital Out-of-Home (DOOH) advertising, which leverages digital signage displays in public spaces to deliver targeted advertisements to people outside of their homes. DOOH has become a significant segment of digital signage, providing advertisers with a dynamic and contextually relevant way to engage with audiences.

== Components ==
=== Hardware components ===
Digital signage hardware includes the physical equipment used to show multimedia content in public and private spaces.

==== Display devices ====
Display devices are the most prominent components of a digital signage system, serving as the primary medium for presenting content. Display devices come in various technologies, such as LCD, LED, and OLED formats, each offering different advantages in terms of clarity, color reproduction, and energy efficiency.

In addition to flat-panel displays, projectors are also commonly used in digital signage, particularly in large-scale settings. Projectors can cast large-format visuals onto walls, screens, or other surfaces, providing flexibility in display size and positioning.

Screen sizes vary widely to suit different applications. Smaller panels are often used in kiosks and point-of-sale systems, while larger displays, such as video walls and projection surfaces, are deployed in venues like stadiums, auditoriums, and other public spaces.

Many digital signage displays are also equipped with touchscreen capabilities, allowing for interactive applications. These interactive displays are commonly used in information kiosks, wayfinding systems, and self-service applications.

==== Playback devices ====
Playback devices are specialized hardware components that manage the storage, processing, and transmission of multimedia content to digital signage displays and projectors. They serve as the crucial link between the content management system (CMS) and the visual output, ensuring seamless playback of static images, video files, animated graphics, and real-time content, such as news feeds.

Playback devices can be standalone units or integrated into display hardware using System-on-Chip (SoC) technology. The latter reduces hardware complexity and installation time, making the system more efficient.

These devices support remote or local content updates, allowing digital signage operators to manage networks effectively. Content can be updated via cloud-based platforms for centralized control or through direct interfaces on-site, depending on the system's configuration and deployment requirements.

==== Mounting systems ====
Mounting systems provide structural support for digital signage displays, enabling deployment across diverse environments. Typical configurations include wall mounts, ceiling mounts, and floor stands each engineered to meet specific spatial and functional requirements.

=== Software components ===
Digital signage software is responsible for content creation, scheduling, and management. It enables users to manage and distribute content to one or more playback devices.

==== Software compatibility ====
Digital signage software supports various operating systems, including Android, Windows, Linux, iOS, tvOS, webOS, Tizen, ChromeOS, macOS, Roku OS and others. This allows customers to choose the hardware and software solution that best suits their digital signage needs.

== Interactivity ==
Interactivity in digital signage allows users to interact directly with displays using input methods like touch, gestures, voice, or proximity sensors. This feature enables real-time responses and personalized content, improving the user experience. Interactive digital signage is commonly used in places like retail, transportation, education, and public spaces to create engaging and informative interactions.

Additionally, self-service kiosks are often integrated into interactive signage solutions, allowing users to perform tasks such as ordering products, checking in for flights, accessing information, or making payments. These kiosks empower users to complete transactions or obtain services independently, improving efficiency and convenience in high-traffic locations.

== Audience measurement and context-aware content adaptation ==
=== Audience measurement ===
Cameras can be integrated into digital signage systems to enable audience measurement. They are used to detect and count viewers, estimate demographics such as age and gender, measure dwell time and attention, and sometimes analyze emotional reactions using computer vision techniques. This process is valuable for understanding audience behavior and refining business strategies. Privacy concerns are addressed by anonymizing collected data and avoiding the storage of personally identifiable information.

=== Context-aware digital signage ===
Context-aware digital signage refers to systems that adjust content based on environmental or audience data. The infrastructure supporting context awareness, including sensors and analytics systems, also facilitates the collection of audience insights. While these insights may be primarily used for reporting, optimization, or planning future campaigns rather than immediate content adjustments, they play a crucial role in the overall context-aware ecosystem.

==== Contextual information ====
Contextual information in the realm of context-aware digital signage refers to data about the environment, audience, and other factors that influence how digital signage content is displayed. This information helps the system to deliver more relevant, timely, and personalized content to its audience. Contextual information can include, but is not limited to:

- Audience demographics — this can involve detecting the age, gender, or even emotional state of viewers through cameras or sensors. It helps tailor content to specific audience segments, improving engagement.
- Time and weather — the system may adjust content based on the time of day or current weather conditions. For example, weather-appropriate content (like a raincoat ad on a rainy day) or time-specific content (like dinner menu promotions in the evening) can be shown.
- Emergency information — in situations of emergency, systems can prioritize displaying urgent notifications such as fire alerts, disaster warnings, or evacuation instructions. This can be crucial for public safety in crowded environments or densely populated areas. The system may adapt content in real-time to inform and guide individuals to safety, offering location-specific instructions or emergency service contacts.

== Challenges ==
=== Display blindness ===
Digital signage in public spaces has been found to lose visibility, significantly diminishing its ability to capture attention. This issue, known as "Display Blindness", was identified by Müller et al. and refers to the phenomenon where digital advertisements are largely overlooked by passersby. Observations indicate that many of these advertisements fail to resonate with their audience, often being irrelevant or unengaging, which leads to passive reception and reduced interaction.

== Comparison with print signage ==
Digital signage and traditional print signage serve similar purposes by delivering visual information to a target audience, but they differ significantly in terms of flexibility, cost, maintenance, and environmental impact.

Digital signage is advantageous in low-light or nighttime environments, where its internal illumination ensures visibility without the need for external lighting, unlike printed signs, which may require additional fixtures to be seen after dark.

=== Content and flexibility ===
Digital signage allows for dynamic and real-time content updates, often controlled remotely through content management systems. This makes it well-suited for environments where information changes frequently, such as advertising and transportation schedules. In contrast, print signage is static and requires physical replacement for any updates, making it less adaptable to changing information needs.

=== Cost considerations ===
Print signage generally involves lower initial production and installation costs. Digital signage involves higher upfront expenses due to hardware, software, and installation requirements, but it can reduce long-term costs by eliminating the need for recurring print production.

=== Environmental impact ===
Print signage typically relies on paper, plastics, and inks, contributing to physical waste, especially in applications with high turnover. Digital signage eliminates the need for disposable materials but introduces concerns related to electronic waste, energy consumption, and light pollution. Digital screens, especially those left illuminated in public spaces at night, can contribute to unwanted light spill, disrupting natural environments and contributing to urban light pollution. The environmental impact of either approach depends on usage patterns, energy management, and system lifecycle management.

=== Market trends ===
The adoption of digital signage is accelerating globally, although printed signage continues to represent a significant portion of the signage industry.

The adoption of digital signage has contributed to a gradual decline in demand for traditional printed signage. For instance, in Canada, the printed signage market is projected to experience a modest decline, with a compound annual growth rate (CAGR) of approximately -1.3% between 2024 and 2029, reflecting the ongoing transition to digital formats. However, digital signage has not fully replaced print signage. Many businesses continue to rely on print for certain applications, particularly in contexts where digital displays are impractical or cost-prohibitive. In response, some companies have developed hybrid solutions that integrate both digital and printed elements to leverage the strengths of each format.

== See also ==
- Electronic signage
- Emergency communication system
- Kiosk software
- Out-of-home advertising
- Retail media
- Signage
