= Mega event advertising =

Major annual or one-time televised mega-events can draw large viewership and significant interest from regional, national, and international advertisers. Advertisers strategically unveil major marketing campaigns in conjunction with televised mega-events and create memorable advertising content with high entertainment value. Some mega-event advertising, such as during the Super Bowl, even attracts a subset of viewers interested primarily in the advertising content. This type of advertisement is an increasingly common television phenomenon as televised mega-events become more popular and available globally.

== Origin ==
In response to the high production costs of early television, broadcasters envisioned a business model much like the successful radio broadcasters of the time. This led the Federal Communications Commission (FCC) to permit commercial advertising on television broadcasts in May 1941. The first television advertisement, a very brief advertisement for Bulova watches, aired on July 1, 1941, before a baseball game between the Brooklyn Dodgers and Philadelphia Phillies.

Broadcast mega-events, particularly by radio, were not uncommon prior to the widespread adoption of television as a form of home entertainment. However, the affordability of television sets and other technological barriers kept television mega-events relatively uncommon until at least the 1950s and 1960s. As the entertainment value of televised mega-events increased with the addition of improved picture resolution, audio and production quality, so did viewership and the opportunity to reach large audiences. Simultaneously, television advertisements developed into increasingly sophisticated, persuasive and targeted forms of communication. Many of the earliest and most notable television mega-event advertisements are associated with the Super Bowl, but other similar mega-events such ESPN’s X Games have become in part defined by the advertising backdrop that accompanies them.

== Definition ==
Television mega event advertising is commercial television advertising content designed and produced to be launched or solely aired in conjunction with a televised mega-event. Although there is no specific guideline that defines a mega-event, the British Library provides us with the following: “Although mega-events each have their peculiarities, they also share a number of characteristics: for example they are transient, but often of great economic and cultural significance; they employ drama and spectacle to underline and promote values of local, national or international importance, and they throw light on the societies, institutions and elites who are involved with them.” From the British library: mega-events Müller (2015) pointed out four dimensions of mega-events definition, they are: visitor-attractiveness, mediated reach, costs and trans-formative impact.

== Examples ==
=== Sporting Events ===
Televised sporting events, especially mega events such as the Super Bowl or NCAA Basketball Playoffs are attractive to advertisers since these events are mostly watched live, eliminating effects of Digital Video Recorder (DVR) and streaming. This allows advertisers to directly target their consumer demographic, usually 18-30-year-old males. In 2012, 13.3 billion dollars was spent on televised sports advertising, which amounted to 23% of total money spent on TV advertising in the US.

The top sporting mega event is the Super Bowl, which was watched by approximately 111 million people in 2014. The NFL decides on advertising content and has contracts in place with companies to provide exclusivity in advertising, eliminating ads placed by competitors. This allowed the league to charge up to 4.2 million dollars for a thirty-second spot in 2014.

Another example of a sporting mega event is March Madness, which CBS recently paid 10.8 billion dollars for the television rights. Unlike the Super Bowl which is a single event, the NCAA Tournament spans three weeks in March and televises 65 games. The total advertising revenue for CBS and its cable partners was over 1.1 billion dollars in 2014 with thirty second spots costing upwards of 1.4 million dollars for the championship game. These sports events have benefits of improving national branding image, especially for emerging nations. Positive political and economic impacts on the developing areas have gained more and more attention by governments.

=== Pop Culture Award Shows ===
Televised events such as the Academy Awards, the Grammys, and People’s Choice Awards often pull in large advertising revenues. The mega event of these shows is the Academy Awards. The average rate of a thirty-second spot seen during the Academy Awards was 1.9 million. When calculated as advertising dollars per viewer, advertisers pay 12% more per viewer for the Academy Awards than for the Super Bowl. Recent surveys show that the percentage of Academy Award viewers were more likely to buy products seen during ads placed in the Academy Awards, compared to the Super Bowl (31.1% to 6.9% respectively). The premium paid by advertisers to the Academy Awards is also due to more of a targeted demographic (more affluent females), less competition and more category exclusivity.

=== TV Series ===
While advertising rates on hit TV series such as The Walking Dead can be higher than televised sporting events such as Monday Night Football, advertisers want to be a part of historic pop culture events such as iconic TV series finales. The huge ratings these shows garner results in skyrocketing ad rate increases. For example, the finale of The Daily Show with Jon Stewart resulted in a five-fold increase in rates with a thirty-second spot costing as much as $250,000. Furthermore, advertisers were required to purchase ads to run across the entire Comedy Central Network leading up to the finale at a cost of 1-2 million just to have the opportunity to purchase spots in the finale itself. While other TV series finales such as Breaking Bad charged as much as $300,000 for a 30-second spot, this is dramatically less than rates on broadcast TV finales. For example, the series finales of Friends, Seinfeld and Everybody Loves Raymond charged $1 million to $2 million for 30 second spots. The most watched TV series finale of all time was M*A*S*H, which was viewed by over 105 million viewers in 1983. The rate for 30 second ads for the M*A*S*H finale was $450,000.

== Cost/Value ==
=== Cost ===
Super Bowl ads in 1967 were sold for at $37,000 for a 30-second ad. For comparison, 30 second television advertising spots in the 2014 Super Bowl sold at up to $4 million. This reflects increased competition of national and international level brand names as well as developing interest and demand among viewers for television broadcast mega-events. The cost of mega event advertising spots are determined to some degree by the costs the network paid to air the event and generally, like regular advertising time, are sold on a first-come, first-served basis. However, prices can increase with increasing advertiser demand. Advertisers may pay additional for specific demands such as placement of their advertisement at a specific point during the progression of an event or at the beginning or end of an advertising break when viewers are more likely to be attentive to what is being advertised. Certain events also allow sponsors the right to brand themselves as "exclusive" event sponsors in television and print media for an additional charge. In general, advertisers are advised to divide television advertising budgets so that approximately 20% is used to secure a spot and the remaining 80% is used to develop the content of the advertisement. Networks may also offer advertising time packages in which much less desirable advertising time spots are offered in a package with the premium time spots that advertisers want. This allows networks to fill advertising space more cost effectively.

=== Value ===
Whether or not the inflated cost of television mega-event advertising offers real value to advertisers is up for debate. While mega events offer a significant opportunity to connect to potential customers, the cost of mega event advertising also represents a significant risk. In addition, measuring the impact of television mega event advertising can be problematic. Television ratings, or Nielsen Ratings which measure television broadcast viewership size and composition, have several disadvantages when compared to newer forms of media such as streaming internet, pay-per-views and smart phones.

== Technological Impacts ==
There have been several technological advancements and innovations in recent years which have greatly impacted TV advertising. One of the most significant is the DVR which promises the ability to “skip” advertisements for their customers. Since its introduction in 2003, the number of devices and its use has greatly increased which common wisdom might suggest would spell the demise of TV advertisement in all but live events. The term most commonly used with DVR's ability to skip commercials is referred to as “zipping.” The ability to zip through unwanted commercials to enjoy the recorded programs was seen so negatively that in 2006 major networks acceded to advertisers to only use live ratings as currency when setting prices for TV advertising space. The primary justification for advertisers was the notion that recorded advertisements had no value due to advertising avoidance.

An important discussion often ignored was that viewers have been avoiding TV advertisements since their invention. One such way was to switch to another channel, or “multitask” by having conversations with others, leave the room, mute the TV, or more recently, zip through the commercials in a recorded program. While studies have shown commercials tend to lose 59% to 75% of the audience in recorded programming there is still residual value during the zipped commercials. The three major reasons zipped ads may still be effective include: heightened attention, latent effects, and effects of time compression. While fast forwarding or zipping through commercials on a Video Cassette Recorder or DVR, one must pay close attention to the TV in order to know when to when the show resumes. This intense awareness resulted in about 15% to 59% retention of the commercials zipped. The second reason zipped commercials may have value is due to the latent effects they cause. For example, many people only need to have a glimpse of the golden arches or a silver apple to understand their meaning. Finally, the effects of time compression can have positive effects on consumers. Many studies have shown increased effectiveness in radio and TV commercials with moderately increased time compression. They can both have recall effects and boost prior learning effectively functioning as a reminder advertisement.

== See also ==
- Super Bowl advertising
- Online advertising
- Pay-per-view
- Radio advertisement
