= Unipole sign =

Advertising sign frame structure

Unipole (or monopole) sign is an advertising sign (usually billboard) frame structure mounted atop a single steel pole or column.

The Uni-pole is a large-format billboard type placed atop a very high pole. Its effectiveness is enhanced by the fact that this billboard can be seen even from long distances. There are two options when it comes to illumination: this can either be a light box or front-lit for versatility.

== Other uses ==
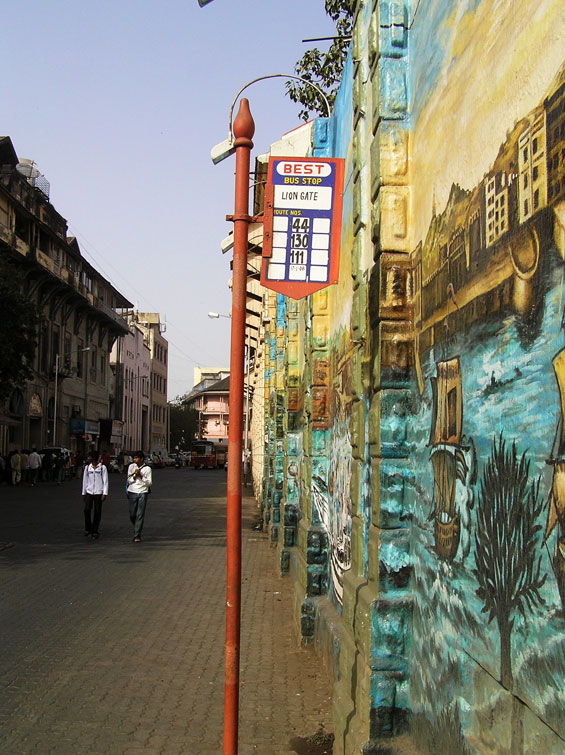
A unipole bus stop in Mumbai

Unipoles are also used to mark bus stops.
