= Retail media =

Advertising near the point of sale in shops

Retail media is marketing to consumers at or near their point of purchase, or point of choice between competing brands or products. Common techniques include in-store advertising, online advertising, sampling, loyalty cards and coupons or vouchers.

The planning and use of retail media is a key component in the delivery of shopper marketing campaigns.

Retail media channels have become established as important for promoting goods and services at or near or even further beyond the points of purchase and consumption. Retail media is now being taken more seriously by most traditional media agencies.

Retail media originated as media available within the retail environment. This has now developed into a media discipline in its own right as new retail media channels have been added. Retail media now reaches outside the retail environment to encompass media channels such loyalty program marketing, coupons and door drops, fleet media (retailer's fleet vehicles, etc.).

Though many retail media channels are found inside the retailer's store/environment, the media channels themselves are not always "owned" or operated by retailers. Many retail media channels are operated independently by specialist media companies who also manage other media outside the retail environment.

With the deprecation of the third-party tracking cookie, retail media's use of first-party data has made it an appealing option for targeted advertising. Retail media advertising spending represented approximately 21% of global digital advertising spending as of 2024.

== Context and targeting ==
Retail media channels are to a large extent defined by the context of the retailer. The majority of retail media channels reach their audience at or near the point of purchase or point of choice. Research suggests media placed at or near the points of choice/purchase can have a significant impact on purchasing decisions (PoS).^{1} Media owners and agencies have learnt more in recent years about the value of retail media channels.

There is potential for conflict of interest between the retailer selling the media and the CPG/FMCG buying the media, which is why retailers often engage a third-party media owner to operate and sell media space on their behalf.

== On-site and Off-site ==
Online retail media started with on-site ad placements on retailer websites. These ads typically appeared close to the point of purchase or in a search as a sponsored placement.

Off-site retail media emerged in the early 2020s, allowing retailers to use their data across the open web and other marketing channels.

== Challenges ==
- Audience measures: There are several methods for evaluating the audience for retail media, whether total footfall, segmented audiences or sales uplift attributed to retail media channels.
- Buying process: Dependent on the retailer, product, sales cycle and retail media channel, and other concerns, there are different media sales cycles to fit the particular requirements.

== Agencies ==
Due to the specialized nature of retail media programs, advertisers are increasingly turning to dedicated retail media agencies to facilitate shopper-targeted campaigns.

Retail media agencies help connect retailers such as Walmart and Sam's Club with brands that are interested in presenting their message to consumers while they are navigating the path to purchase.

== Networks ==
Retail media networks are channels spanning individual retailers or a multitude of retailers. They can range from static posters, point-of-sale material, audio, visual or digital materials, and many things in between. Networks can therefore provide narrowcast and broadcast audience buying solutions. As shoppers spend time in stores, it becomes difficult for them to avoid in-store advertising and this can benefit advertisers, who not only can ensure their campaigns are seen, but that they can also be acted upon, especially if the advertised product is available in the store.

Retail media networks now offer accountability in providing audience measurement techniques in the same way as traditional broadcast or print media.

== See also ==
- Digital signage
- Retail
- Retail design
- Signage
- Visual merchandising
