= Amatul Kibria Keya Chowdhury =

Bangladeshi politician

Member of the Bangladesh Parliament for Habiganj-1
- In office 30 January 2024 – 6 August 2024
- Preceded by: Gazi Mohammad Shahnawaz
- Succeeded by: Reza Kibria

Member of the Bangladesh Parliament for Reserved Women's Seat-28
- In office 29 January 2014 – 28 January 2019
- Preceded by: Shawkat Ara Begum
- Succeeded by: Sayeda Rubina Akter

Personal details
- Born: 11 October 1978 (age 47) Habiganj District, Bangladesh
- Party: Bangladesh Awami League

Amatul Kibria Keya Chowdhury is a Bangladesh Awami League politician and a former Jatiya Sangsad member representing the Habiganj-1 constituency.

== Biography ==
Amatul Kibria Keya Chowdhury's father was Commandant Manik Chowdhury, a Bangladesh Awami League politician and an accused in the Agartala Conspiracy Case. He fought for the independence of Bangladesh from Pakistan in 1971. Amatul's father died when she was eight years old. She is the secretary general of Chetona '71 in Habiganj District, a non-government organisation that documents the history of Bangladesh Liberation war. She was elected to parliament from the 28 number seat, based in Habiganj District, of the reserved seats for women in 2014. She has campaigned for the recognition of female "freedom fighters" by the government of Bangladesh and providing them with the facilities due under law. She was able to successfully get recognition for six female "freedom fighters".

Chowdhury was hospitalized on 10 November 2017 after attending a program of the Department of Social Services in Bahubal Upazila, Habiganj District, during which a physical altercation broke out between her supporters and those of Bahubal Upazila vice-chairman and Jubo League leader, Tara Mia. The program was to distribute welfare cheques and benefits cards among elderly gypsies. The police had to charge at the crowd to bring the situation under control.
