= Reza Kibria =

Bangladeshi Economist and Politician

Reza Kibria রেজা কিবরিয়া
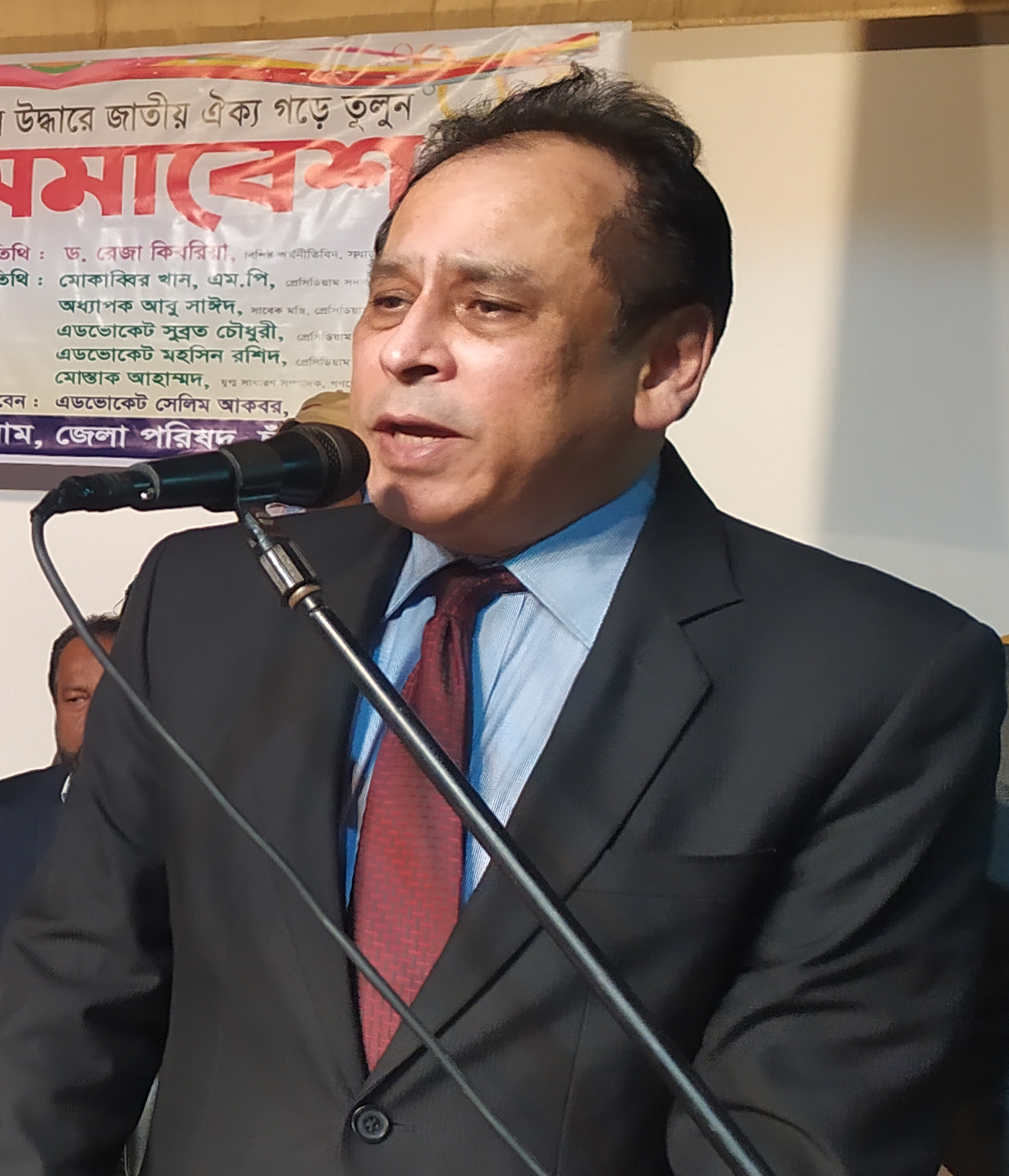
- Kibria in 2020

Member of Parliament
- Incumbent
- Assumed office 16 February 2026
- Preceded by: Amatul Kibria Keya Chowdhury
- Constituency: Habiganj-1

Convener of Gono Odhikar Parishad
- In office 26 October 2021 – 19 June 2023
- Preceded by: Position established
- Succeeded by: Nurul Haque Nur

General Secretary of Gano Forum
- In office 5 May 2019 – 7 February 2021
- President: Kamal Hossain
- Preceded by: Mostafa Mohsin Montu
- Succeeded by: Mizanur Rahman

Personal details
- Born: 6 March 1957 (age 69) Sylhet District, East Pakistan, Pakistan (present-day Nabiganj Upazila, Habiganj District, Bangladesh)
- Party: Bangladesh Nationalist Party
- Other political affiliations: Gono Odhikar Parishad (2021–2023); Gano Forum (2018–2021)
- Spouse: Simi Kibria
- Parents: Shah AMS Kibria (father); Asma Kibria (mother)
- Education: Ph.D. in Economics
- Alma mater: University of Oxford; Queen's University
- Occupation: Economist, professor, author, politician

Reza Kibria (Bengali: রেজা কিবরিয়া; born 6 March 1957) is a Bangladeshi economist, writer, and politician. He is the incumbent Jatiya Sangsad member representing the Habiganj-1 constituency. He worked for many years with the International Monetary Fund (IMF). From 1996 to 2000, he served as the Macroeconomic Adviser to the Department of Finance of the Government of Papua New Guinea. He also worked as a Macro-Fiscal Adviser to the Ministry of Economy and Finance of the Government of Cambodia under an IMF assignment. In politics, Kibria has served as the General Secretary of Gano Forum. He later became a founding convener of the Gono Odhikar Parishad and its breakaway faction, the Amjanatar Dol.

== Early life ==
Kibria was born on 6 March 1957 in the village of Jalalsap, located in Habiganj subdivision of Sylhet district in what was then East Pakistan (now Bangladesh). He earned a bachelor's degree in philosophy, Politics and Economics from the University of Oxford and a master's degree in economics from Queen's University. He later completed both MPhil and DPhil degrees in economics from Oxford.

Kibria joined the International Monetary Fund (IMF) in 1984. In 1993, he briefly served as a professor in the Department of Economics at the University of Dhaka. From 1996 to 2000, he worked as a macroeconomic adviser to the Department of Finance of the Government of Papua New Guinea. He then served for eight years as the Chief Economist of PDP Australia. Between 2009 and 2011, he was the Macroeconomic Adviser at the IMF's East Africa Regional Technical Assistance Center. He has also worked as a professor at Griffith University. From 2016, he served for two years as a macro-fiscal adviser to the Ministry of Economy and Finance of the Government of Cambodia under an IMF assignment. Since 2015, he has been serving as the chairman of Integro Holdings.

== Political career ==
Reza Kibria initially supported the Bangladesh Awami League. In 2007, he contacted Muhammad Yunus to join the political platform Nagorik Shakti. He formally entered politics in 2018 after resigning from his international job and returning to Bangladesh, where he joined the political party Gano Forum. He was subsequently elected to the party's presidium.

According to his 2018 electoral affidavit, he was the wealthiest candidate in the Habiganj-1 constituency. On 26 December 2018, a police raid was conducted at his house based on reports that a wanted BNP leader, Mujibur Rahman Seefu, was hiding there. A village announcement through mosque loudspeakers claimed police were attacking his home, prompting local resistance and unrest. Reza Kibria stated that police failed to show a warrant and allegedly tore election posters and seized documents. He contested the 2018 general election but was defeated.

Later, he was appointed General Secretary of Gano Forum, which led to internal conflicts and disputes. In February 2021, he resigned from the party, although he stated he was not retiring from politics. While expressing some sympathy for the Bangladesh Nationalist Party (BNP), he said he would not join due to the party's lack of clear direction.

On 26 October 2021, he became the convener of Gono Odhikar Parishad. In 2022, the National Board of Revenue (NBR) issued a notice against him for alleged tax evasion, money laundering, and concealment of income sources. That same year, tensions grew within the party as some younger members questioned his lack of active leadership. This led to a rift between Reza Kibria and the party. In June 2023, Gono Adhikar Parishad split into two factions, and he remained the convener of one. Gono Odhikar Parishad's then-member secretary Nurul Haque Nur accused Kibria of neglecting party duties, secretly meeting intelligence officials, and receiving funds for attending rival group events. In retaliation, Kibria accused Nur of having ties with foreign intelligence services, including Mossad. Asif Nazrul criticized Kibria as unfit for leadership, stating he failed to fulfill the party's goals. Three days after leaving the Reza-led faction, he officially announced his departure from the party on 3 January 2024, without stating a reason. However, in May 2024, he was named the Chief Adviser of the same faction.

In August 2024, after the resignation of Prime Minister Sheikh Hasina, Kibria announced his intention to contest the next national election from Habiganj-1. On 27 January 2025, in a video message, he expressed dissatisfaction with the investigation into his father's assassination, alleging that Awami League MP and businessman Salman F. Rahman financially supported the attack.

In September 2024, Kibria publicly claimed that MPs Abu Zahir (Habiganj-3), Abdul Majid Khan (Habiganj-2), and Awami League leader Mushfiq Hossain Chowdhury were involved in his father's murder. He also alleged that BNP leader and former Habiganj mayor G. K. Gaus was a drug trade partner of Abu Zahir. Gaus denied the allegations, and following public backlash, Kibria retracted his statement, saying he was not certain of their guilt. On 28 September 2024, protests, including symbolic "broom processions," were held in Habiganj in response to his comments.

On 30 November 2025, Kibria formally joined the Bangladesh Nationalist Party at an event held at the party chairperson's office in Gulshan, Dhaka. In the 2026 Bangladeshi general election, He was elected from the Habiganj-1 constituency. He received 111,999 votes, while his nearest rival, Sirajul Islam, a candidate of the Bangladesh Khelafat Majlish, secured 56,132 votes.

== Personal life ==
Reza Kibria is the son of Shah A. M. S. Kibria, a senior Awami League leader and the 18th Finance Minister of Bangladesh. His father was assassinated in a grenade attack in Habiganj District in 2005. His mother, Asma Kibria, was a painter who died from a heart attack in 2015. Kibria was married to actress Rina Sultana Kibria, daughter of journalist Mozammel Haque.

== Publications ==
- Kibria, Reza. "The Political Economy of Reform: Designing, Initiating and Sustaining Public Sector Reform in Developing Countries." Journal of International Affairs, vol. 6, no. 3, 2002, Bangladesh Institute of Law and International Affairs (BILIA), Dhaka.
