= Nabiganj Upazila =

Nabiganj নবীগঞ্জ
- Upazila
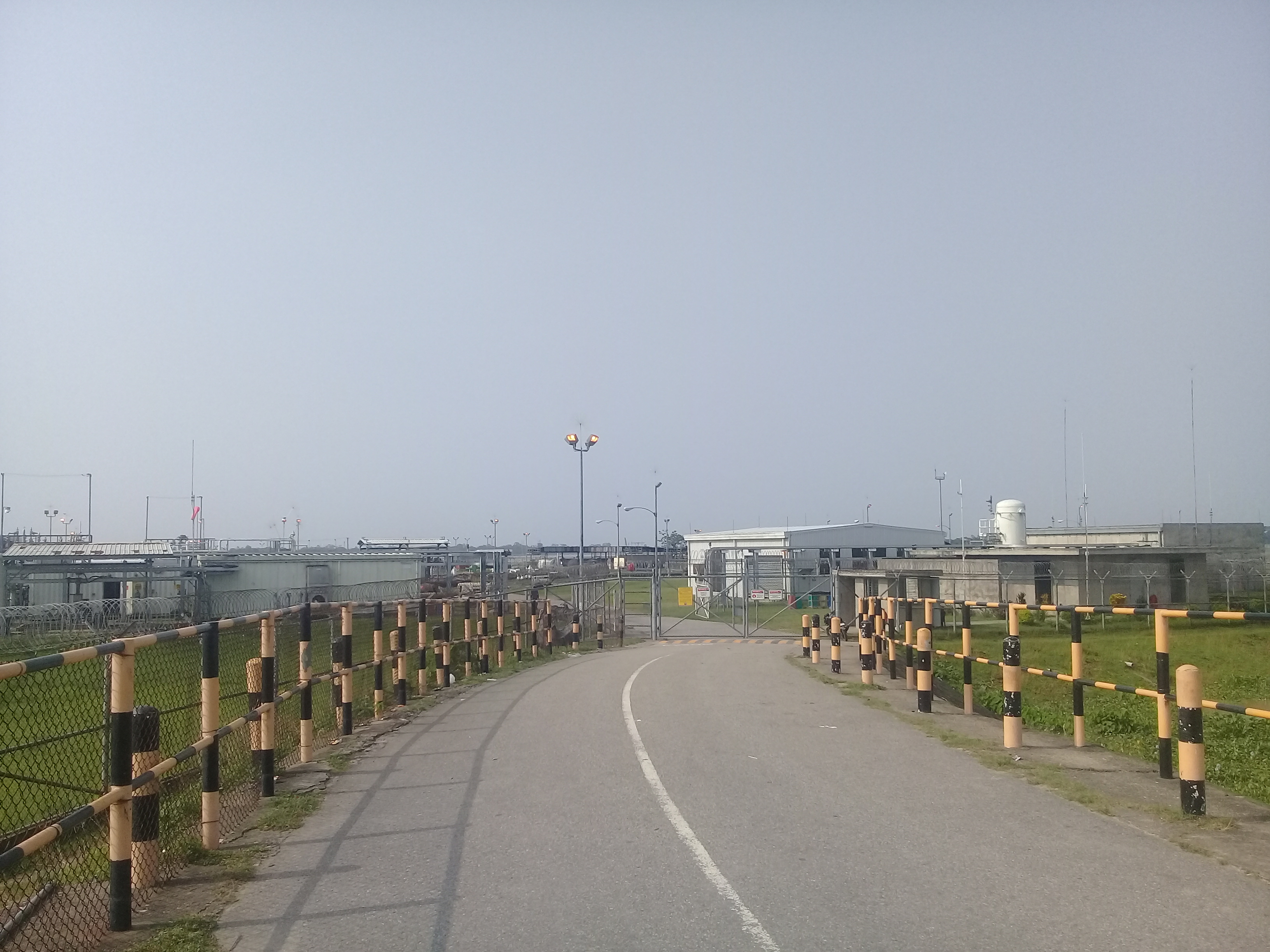
- Bibiyana Gas Field

- Coordinates: 24°34′N 91°30.9′E
- Country: Bangladesh
- Division: Sylhet
- District: Habiganj
- Thana: 1839
- Upazila: 1983

Government
  - MP (Habiganj-1): Vacant
  - Upazila Chairman: Muhammad Fazlul Haq Chowdhury Salim Timirpuri

Area
  - Total: 439.61 km^{2} (169.73 sq mi)

Population (2022)
  - Total: 367,385
  - Density: 835.71/km^{2} (2,164.5/sq mi)
- Demonym: Nabiganji or Nobigonji
- Time zone: UTC+6 (BST)
- Postal code: 3370
- Area code: 08328
- Website: nabiganj.habiganj.gov.bd

Nabiganj (Bengali: নবীগঞ্জ, romanized: Nobīgonj, is an Upazila of Habiganj District in the Division of Sylhet, Bangladesh.

Nabiganj Upazila mauza geocode map

== History ==
After the Conquest of Sylhet in 1303, many disciples of Shah Jalal migrated and settled in present-day Nabiganj where they preached Islam to the local people. Shah Sikandar migrated to Paschimgaon (Sikandarpur), Hafiz Muhammad Zakariyyah Arabi to Pithua, Shah Sadruddin Qurayshi to Parbatpur (Sadrabad) and Qazi Tajuddin Qurayshi to Chouki.

In the late 17th century, Inathganj Bazar was founded. Inathganj became a centre for the Asian Jute trade. The current Inathganj High School was originally a jute warehouse. Many ships would crowd in the banks of Inathganj Bazar, and go to many corners of the world, and evidence of this remains at the present-day high school.

== Geography ==
Nabiganj is located at 24.56701°N 91.51430°E. It has a total area of 439.61 km^{2} (169.73 sq mi).

== Demographics ==
Religions in Nabiganj Upazila (2022)
Religion	Percent
Islam	85.01%
Hinduism	14.97%
Other or not stated	0.02%

According to the 2022 Bangladeshi census, Nabiganj Upazila had 72,650 households and a population of 367,385. 9.59% of the population were under 5 years of age. Nabiganj had a literacy rate (age 7 and over) of 70.55%: 71.28% for males and 69.89% for females, and a sex ratio of 93.22 males for every 100 females. 38,670 (10.53%) lived in urban areas.

According to the 2011 Census of Bangladesh, Nabiganj Upazila had 61,770 households and a population of 345,179. 95,265 (27.60%) were under 10 years of age. Nabiganj had a literacy rate (age 7 and over) of 41.01%, compared to the national average of 51.8%, and a sex ratio of 1034 females per 1000 males. 29,513 (8.55%) lived in urban areas.

As of the 1991 Bangladesh census, Nabiganj has a population of 246933. Males constitute 50.27% of the population, and females 49.73%. This Upazila's eighteen up population is 126527. Nabiganj has an average literacy rate of 26.4% (7+ years), and the national average of 32.4% literate.

== Administration ==
Nabiganj Upazila is divided into 13 union parishads: Aushkandi, Bausha, Debparra, Digholbak, Gaznaipur, Inatganj, Kaliarbhanga, Kargoan, Kurshi, Nabiganj Sadar, Paniumda, Paschim Bara Bhakoir, and Purba Bara Bhakoir. The union parishads are subdivided into 219 mauzas and 355 villages.

== Notable residents ==
- Shah A M S Kibria, Finance Minister of Bangladesh
- Abdul Moshabbir, lawyer
- Hazrat Shah Tajuddin Qurashi, companion of Hazrat Shahjalal
- Abdul Munim Chowdhury, former MP
- Abdul Momin Imambari, Bangladeshi Islamic scholar and politician
- Abdur Rouf Choudhury, writer
- Dewan Farid Gazi, politician
- Dewan Mahbubur Rob Sadi Chaudhuri (Bir Protik), sub-sector commander (1971), former MP
- Foysol Choudhury, businessman and member of the Scottish Parliament
- Anudvaipayan Bhattacharya, physicist
- Ismat Ahmed Chowdhury, politician
- Khalilur Rahman Chowdhury, politician
- Shegufta Bakht Chaudhuri, fourth governor of Bangladesh Bank
- Gazi Mohammad Shahnawaz, politician

== See also ==
- Upazilas of Bangladesh
- Districts of Bangladesh
- Divisions of Bangladesh
