= Abdul Mannan Chowdhury (politician) =

Bangladeshi politician

Abdul Mannan Chowdhury Sanu Mia
- আব্দুল মান্নান চৌধুরী
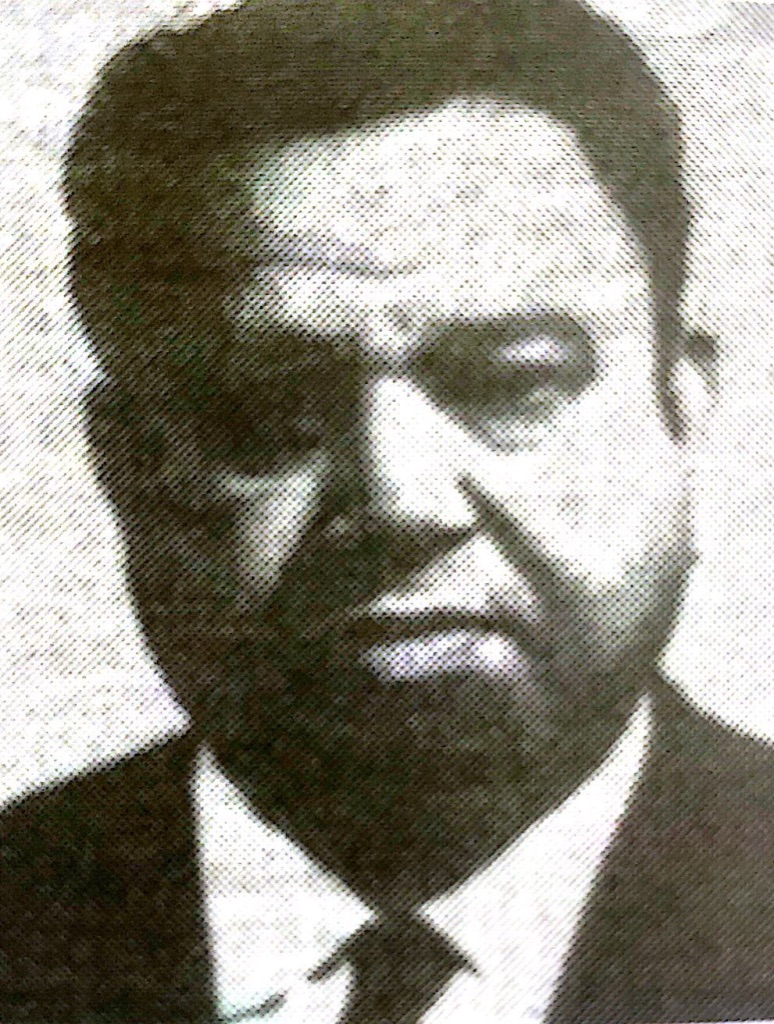

Member of Jatiya Sangsad
- In office 7 March 1973 – 6 November 1976
- Succeeded by: Mahbubur Rob Sadi
- Constituency: Sylhet-21

Personal details
- Born: Nabiganj, Habiganj, Sylhet district
- Party: Awami League

Abdul Mannan Chowdhury (Bengali: আব্দুল মান্নান চৌধুরী), also known by his daak naam Sanu Mia (Bengali: ছানু মিয়া), was a Bangladeshi politician and organiser during the Bangladesh Liberation War. He was a member of parliament, representing the Awami League from the former Sylhet-21 constituency.

== Biography ==
Chowdhury was born into a Bengali Muslim family of Chowdhuries from Nabiganj in Habiganj (then under Sylhet district).

He began his career in 1935, in the ships of Calcutta. In 1936, he moved to England.By 1939 he opened the Green Mask on Old Brompton Road, he was also a known elder in the community was very good friends with Shiekh Mujib, where Mujib would stay with him whilst in London. His house in Kensington and cafe on Old Brompton Road was a centre for politics and played a part to helping Bangladeshi students settle, study and find accommodation also ultimately towards Bangladesh's independence. For his efforts a high way road was named after him in Bangladesh. On Mujibs last departure from London, he hugged Mannan and said: 'Mannan, Shiekh Mujib does not want to live anymore. He does not have any right to live if he does not fight for the independence of his people, dying in the battlefield and fighting the exploiters is better than this life.' After which Mujib was assassinated. Chowdhury returned to Bangladesh and successfully won a seat in the Sylhet-21 constituency as an Awami League candidate following the 1973 Bangladeshi general election.
