= Mohammad Abdur Rab =

Bangladeshi general and politician (1919–1975)

Mohammad Abdur Rab BU
- মোহাম্মদ আবদুর রব
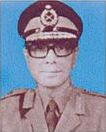

Member of Parliament
- In office 7 March 1973 – 6 November 1975
- Preceded by: Position Established
- Succeeded by: Mahbubur Rob Sadi
- Constituency: Habiganj-2

Personal details
- Born: 1 January 1919 Baniachong, Assam, British India (present day Habiganj, Bangladesh)
- Died: 14 November 1975 (aged 56) CMH, Dacca Division, Bangladesh
- Party: Bangladesh Awami League
- Awards: Bir Uttom; Independence Award

Military service
- Allegiance: British India (before 1947); Pakistan (before 1971); Bangladesh
- Branch/service: British Indian Army; Pakistan Army; Mukti Bahini; Bangladesh Army
- Years of service: 1944 – 1972
- Rank: Major General
- Unit: Army Services Corps
- Commands: Station Commander, Chittagong; Chief of Staff of the Bangladesh Forces
- Battles/wars: World War II; Burma campaign; Indo-Pakistani War of 1965; Bangladesh Liberation War

Mohammad Abdur Rab, BU, psc (Bengali: মোহাম্মদ আব্দুর রব; 1919–1975) also known as M Abdur Rab, was the chief of staff of the Bangladesh Forces from 11 July 1971 till 6 April 1972 during the Liberation War of Bangladesh.

== Early life ==
Abdur-Rab was born at village of Khagaura under Baniachong of Habiganj on 1 January 1919. His father was a leader of local Panchayat. He was the elder one among three brothers. He obtained his primary education from local primary school. He was admitted to Habiganj Government High School from there he completed his matriculation in 1935. In 1937 he completed his I.Sc from Murari Chand College and B.Sc from the same college in geography in 1939. Later he obtained a master's degree in geography from Aligarh Muslim University in 1942.

== Military career ==
In 1943 he joined the British Indian Army. After finishing his training, he was commissioned as a second lieutenant in 1944 with Royal Indian Army Service Corps as his parent unit. He fought on the Burma front in the World War II. In 1947 he joined the Pakistan Army after the partition of India. He served as adjutant of a supply and transport battalion at Quetta and also as supply master in Karachi. He later served as a staff major of Eastern Command station headquarters at Dacca and was eventually raised to the rank of lieutenant colonel. When he was serving as an embarkation station commander in Chittagong Cantonment, he retired on 24 August 1970.

=== Liberation war of Bangladesh ===
After the crackdown of Pakistan Army he grew up a force with Major Chitta Ranjan Dutta in Sylhet to defend the Pakistan Army. After the fall of Sylhet he went to India like others. On 11 July 1971 he was appointed as the chief of staff of the Mukti Bahini and Group Captain A. K. Khandker was appointed as the deputy chief of staff. He established his headquarters at Agartala, Tripura, India. He was appointed as the chairman of Eastern Regional Council. On 16 December 1971, while visiting Sylhet with then Colonel M A G Osmani their helicopter was attacked by the Pakistan Army and he was injured. He was promoted to the rank of major general in 1972. He retired from Army in April 1972.

== Political career ==
A lifelong bachelor, he contested in the general election of 1970 and was elected as member of the Pakistan national assembly as candidate of the Awami League. After the independence of Bangladesh he was elected as lawmaker from the Jatiya Sangsad constituency comprising Baniachang and Ajmiriganj thanas in 1973.

== After independence of Bangladesh ==
Abdur Rab was appointed the chairman of Bangladesh Freedom Fighter Welfare Trust after his retirement from army. Rumors were spread that Abdur Rab was awarded the gallantry medal which his deputy chief of staff (Army) A. K. Khandker conveniently took. Abdur Rab was awarded the Independence Day Award posthumously in 2000.

== Awards and decorations ==

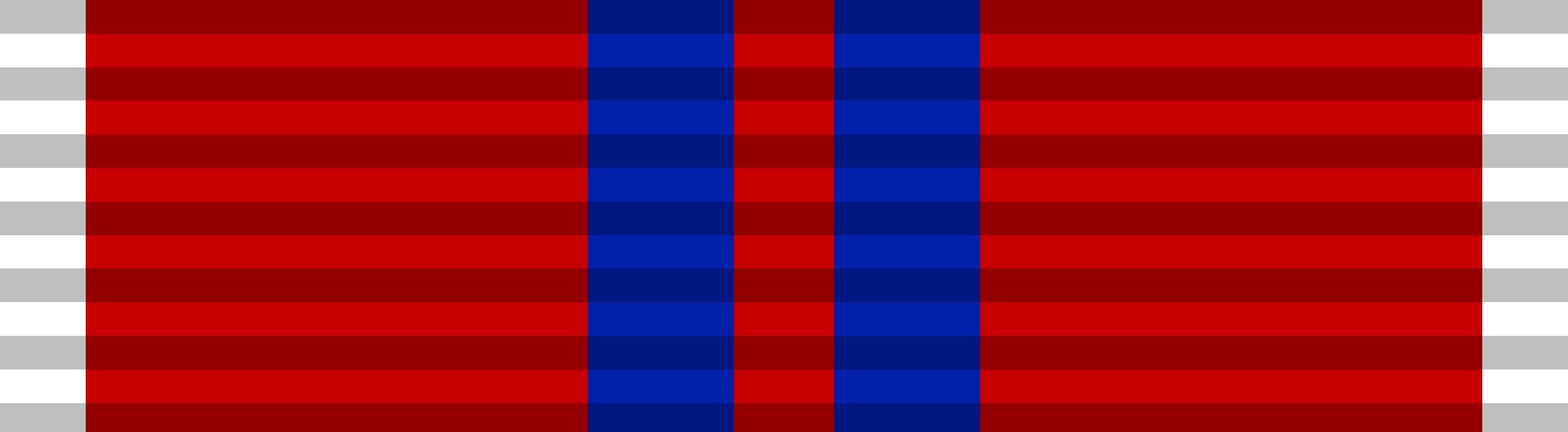

Independence Award (Independence Award) (posthumous)	Bir Uttom (Bir Uttom)	Tamgha-e-Diffa (General Service Medal)	Pakistan Tamgha (Pakistan Medal) 1947
Tamgha-e-Jamhuria (Republic Commemoration Medal) 1956	Burma Star	War Medal 1939-1945	Queen Elizabeth II Coronation Medal (1953)

== Death ==
Abdur-Rab died on 14 November 1975 at the Combined Military Hospital, Dhaka at age 56. He had been suffering from ailments including anemia. He was laid to rest at his village of Khagaura on the banks of Khowai River in Habiganj.

His younger brother, Abdur Rahim, said that no pension was paid to any of his family members. Abdur Rab's grave is at the district headquarters of Habiganj. Other than some local freedom fighters, nobody was seen to go visit the site, even on the country's national days.
