= Moyez Uddin Sharif Ruel =

Bangladeshi lawyer and politician

- ময়েজ উদ্দিন শরীফ রুয়েল

Member of the Bangladesh Parliament for Habiganj-2
- In office 30 January 2024 – 6 August 2024
- Preceded by: Md. Abdul Majid Khan
- Succeeded by: Abu Mansur Sakhawat Hasan

Personal details
- Born: 15 March 1985 (age 41) Habiganj, Bangladesh
- Party: Bangladesh Awami League
- Parent: Sharif Uddin Ahmed (father)
- Occupation: Lawyer, politician

Moyez Uddin Sharif Ruel is a Bangladeshi lawyer and politician. He is a former Jatiya Sangsad member representing the Habiganj-2 constituency.

== Early life ==
Moyez Uddin Sharif Ruel was born 15 March 1985 in Jatrapasha village of Baniachang upazila of Habiganj. His father Sharif Uddin Ahmed was a two-time Member of Parliament of Habiganj-2 Constituency and former president and General Secretary of Habiganj District Awami League.

== Political life ==
Ruel Habiganj District Awami League Legal Affairs Secretary. He was the legal affairs secretary of the Central Chhatra League and a member of the legal affairs sub-committee of the Awami League.

Ruel was nominated as a member of parliament as a candidate of Bangladesh Awami League from Habiganj-2 constituency in 2024 twelfth national parliament election.
