= Baniachong Upazila =

Baniachong বানিয়াচং
- Upazila
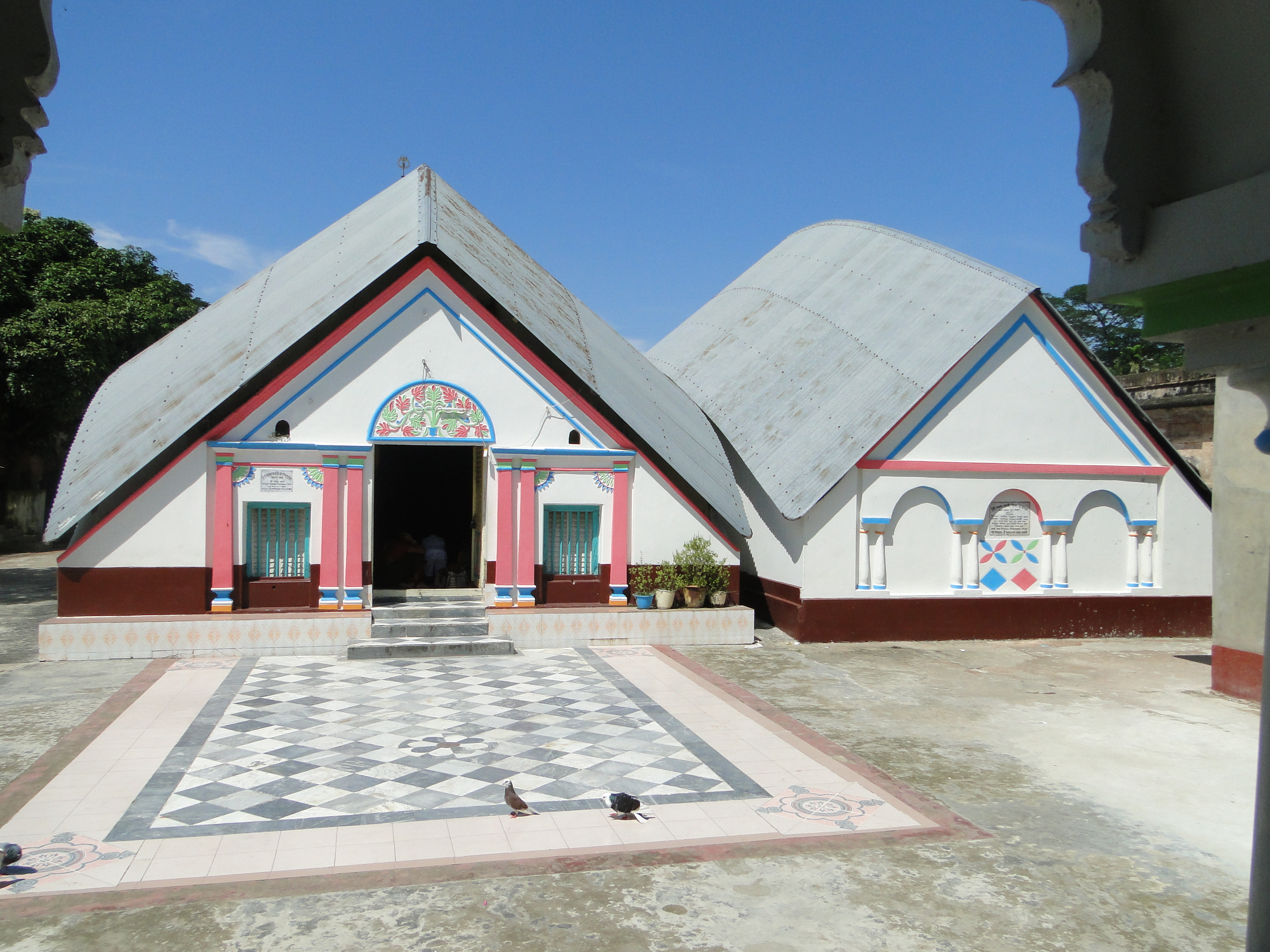
- Bithangol Akhra

- Coordinates: 24°32.5′N 91°20′E
- Country: Bangladesh
- Division: Sylhet
- District: Habiganj

Area
  - Total: 482.26 km^{2} (186.20 sq mi)

Population (2022)
  - Total: 356,425
  - Density: 739.07/km^{2} (1,914.2/sq mi)
- Demonym(s): Baniyachongi, Banyasongi
- Time zone: UTC+6 (BST)
- Postal code: 3350
- Website: baniachong.habiganj.gov.bd

Baniachong (Bengali: বানিয়াচং) is an upazila of Habiganj District in Sylhet Division, Bangladesh. It is widely cited as the largest village in the world by area and local demographics.

Baniachang Upazila mauza geocode map

== History ==
Baniachong constituted the grand estate (zamindari) of Anwar Khan, who was looked upon as a raja by the local people. Estate of Baniachong was so vast, it crisscrossed all districts of Sylhet region as well as the greater Mymensingh, Dhaka and Comilla.

In accordance with the Pargana system introduced by Murshid Quli Khan in 1722, Anwar Khan claimed tenure of 28 Parganas of Muazzamabad, but his claim was rejected after an investigation by the revenue office, as these Parganas belong to the posterity of Shah Muazzam Uddin Qureshi, who assumed the name of Muazzam Khan when he ascended the throne of Muazzamabad.

Hence, these 28 Parganas: Banshikunda (Vamshikunda), Ranadigha, Shelvarsh, Sukhaid, Bétaal, Palash, Laxmanshree, Chamtala, Pagla (Paragala), Dohaliya, Bazu Jatua, Sinchapaid, Shafahar (Shaharpara), Sik Sonaita (Sonauta), Atuajan (Atuajahan), Aatgaon, Kuwazpur, Joar Baniyachung, Kasba Baniyachung, Jalsuka, Bithangal, Joanshahi, Mudaikaid (Mudakadi), Kuresha, Jantari (Yantri), Haveli Sonaita, Satar Sati and Paikuda, were allotted to new landholders that created numerous zamindars and taluquedars in former Muazzamabad (districts of Sunamganj and Habiganj).

The history of the battle between Anwar Khan and his brother Hussain Khan (Bara Bhuiyans of Baniachang) with the Mughal army in the first decade of the seventeenth century is found in the Baharistan-i-Gayebi. Zamindars of Banyachung was renowned for their generosity, but the last zamindar was more than generous; he was well known for his gullibility and his aged but adept and calculating servants such as dewans and chaudharies swindled him left, right and centre. By the time of the retirement, dewans and chauddharies working for Banyachung zamindar ended up holding more lands than the zamindar himself. This was achieved through a severance scheme conjured up by a shrewd dewan; this scheme made the zamindar honour-bound to grant land (taluque) to his servants on retirement and there were two categories of taluque: (i) Khalisa and (ii) Mujrahi, aka Mujrai. The first category of taluque, i.e. Khalisa, was reserved for the male servants and the second category of taluque, i.e. Mujrai, was reserved for zamindar's courtesans. This scheme ruined the zamindary of Baniyachung within a very short span of time and created numerous Khalisadar and Mujraidar in the region, who nowadays style themselves as chowdhury in Sylhet region.

== Geography ==
Baniachong is located at 24.5417°N 91.3333°E. It has 59,433 households and total area 482.46 km^{2}.

Baniachang Upazila is bounded by Sullah and Derai upazilas on the north, Habiganj Sadar and Lakhai upazilas on the south, Habiganj Sadar and Nabiganj upazilas on the east, Ajmiriganj, Mithamain and Austagram upazilas on the west. Main rivers are Kushiyara, Kalai and Barak. Notable beels: Charagaon, Bata, Sonamua, Dhala, Chatal and Chandra Beel.

== Demographics ==
Religions in Baniachong Upazila (2022)
Religion	Percent
Islam	84.58%
Hinduism	15.41%
Other or not stated	0.01%

According to the 2022 Bangladeshi census, Baniachong Upazila had 70,279 households and a population of 356,425. 11.30% of the population were under 5 years of age. Baniachong had a literacy rate (age 7 and over) of 65.78%: 65.51% for males and 66.02% for females, and a sex ratio of 93.03 males for every 100 females. 25,869 (7.26%) lived in urban areas.

According to the 2011 Census of Bangladesh, Baniachong Upazila had 59,433 households and a population of 332,530. 102,564 (30.84%) were under 10 years of age. Baniachong had a literacy rate (age 7 and over) of 34.65%, compared to the national average of 51.8%, and a sex ratio of 1029 females per 1000 males. 28,506 (8.57%) lived in urban areas.

As of the 1991 Bangladesh census, Baniachong has a population of 3,34,605. Males constitute 50.84% of the population, and females 49.16%. This Upazila's eighteen up population is 115151. Baniachong has an average literacy rate of 20.8% (7+ years), and the national average of 32.4% literate.

Baniachang (town) consists of 7 mouzas. The area of the town is 3.06 km^{2}. It has a population of 21,111; male 50.75%, female 49.25%. Literacy rate among the town people is 25.3%. Once the town was the capital of the ancient Loud Kingdom of Sylhet. It has one post house ("dak bungalow").

== Administration ==
Baniachang thana, now an upazila, was established in 1790 and was turned into a sub-division of a district in 1934.

Baniachang Upazila is divided into 15 union parishads: Baraiuri, Dakshin Paschim Baniachong, Dakshin Purba Baniachong, Daulatpur, Kagapasha, Khagaura, Makrampur, Mandari, Muradpur, Pailar Kandi, Pukhra, Sujatpur, Subidpur, Uttar Paschim Baniachong, and Uttar Purba Baniachong. The union parishads are subdivided into 237 mauzas and 359 villages.

Archaeological heritage and relics remnants of ancient Rajbari (1737–38) at Puranbagh, Bibir Dargah Mosque, Bithangal Akhra.

- Chairman: Md. Abul Kashem Chowdhury
- Vice Chairman: Faruk Amin Talukder
- Woman Vice Chairman: Hasina Akther
- Upazila Nirbahi Officer (UNO): Padmasan Singha

== Notable people ==
- Fazle Hasan Abed KCMG, founder of the world's largest non-governmental organisation, BRAC
- Ramnath Biswas, soldier and writer best known for circumnavigating the globe by bicycle
- Sirajul Hossain Khan, former editor of Pakistan Times and the Eastern News Agency
- Mohammad Abdur Rab (Bir Uttam), 1st Chief of Staff of the Bangladesh Army, Major general during the Bangladesh Liberation War
- Najmul Hasan Zahed, Awami League politician
- Padmanath Bhattacharya, historian
- Zakaria Khan Chowdhury was a Bangladesh Nationalist Party politician and a member of parliament from Habiganj-2.

== See also ==
- Thanas of Bangladesh
- Upazilas of Bangladesh
- Districts of Bangladesh
- Divisions of Bangladesh
- Union councils of Bangladesh
- Administrative geography of Bangladesh
