= Abdur Rouf Choudhury =

Bangladeshi novelist (1929–1996)

- Born: March 1, 1929; Mukimpur, Nabiganj, Habiganj District, Assam Province, British India
- Died: 1996
- Occupation: Writer

Abdur Rouf Choudhury (1 March 1929 – 1996) was a Bengali writer.

== Early life ==
Choudhury was born on 1 March 1929, in Mukimpur, Nabiganj, Habiganj District, Bangladesh (then part of Assam), where his father, Azhar Choudhury, a landowner, and his mother, Nazmun Nesa Choudhury, a housewife, resided.

== Contributions ==
In his contributions to Bengali literature, the writer and philosopher Choudhury depicted a transparent portrait of the modern Bengali's life abroad. He was a scholar of science, and he had a notable openness to modern Western knowledge as well as Eastern knowledge. Choudhury made a lasting contribution to Bengali literature with his novels, travelogue, essays, and his introspective autobiographical and epistolary works.

His novels and short stories were often set against an emergent urban background, but more commonly in cities outside Bangladesh, such as London, Bedford, Calcutta, Karachi, and Kohat, where the majority of immigrant Bengalis resided. Choudhury created his characters from highly diverse backgrounds and developed themes that revolved around the twists and turns of events, the conflicts and contradictions prevailing in the social processes. His characters embraced a new change: the death of old social values, which were based on the ideas of corruption, religion, politics, and economics; and the rise of self-freedom and the birth of a new society. These immediately preceded the social processes of the present day and hence are vital to identifying and understanding contemporary problems.

It is essential to analyse Choudhury's writings in the light of the social scenario from the 60s to the 90s, when deprivation and degradation were taken for granted in Bangladesh, London, and India-Pakistan, which were known by some and unknown by others. These realities sometimes were dedicated and made indelible in the name of religious sermons and social sanctions. Thus, his main task was to focus readers' attention by giving a frame-by-frame picture of the helplessness and inhuman predicament of the victims of injustice.

The wide canvas of words and tales of this artist brought out the plight of women in the male-dominated setup of society. Over and above the Islamic-based code of beliefs of the society, the male-dominated society pushed women into complete subjugation, making them property for the use of men. Because of such a 'lifestyle' set-up, economic and social oppression was principally faced by women. This drove women to utter frustration and desperation. Choudhury portrayed women, their plight, and their helplessness in the face of this male-dominated society. On the other hand, he wrote about their sense of humanitarian values, their love, their sorrows, and their deep longing for a life as normal and beautiful as free women.

In the wake of the 1971 Bangladesh Liberation War, which surged up all over Bangladesh, was recounted in his writing Ekti Jatike Hotay (Legacy of a Nation). Choudhury believed that in today's world, men no longer wanted to keep themselves constricted within the sphere of a specified duty.

In Choudhury's time, in a modern society with a priest as its advocate and protector, religion lost all its progressivism. It went so far that religion became bogged down in rituals, superstitions, and bigotry, while its proponents stank of greed, corruption, and even debauchery; even the so-called mullahs could not keep themselves free from this downfall. Almost half the characters in his novels Sampan Crass (St. Pancras) and Aniketon represented the mainstay of the decadent society, while the other half were absorbed with the emerging thoughts, ideals, and values of the new society - humanist and secular in content.

Choudhury most vividly depicted the unity of Bengal and the articulation of Bengali nationalism in his novel Natun Diganta (New Horizon) vol. 1, 2, 3. This is the largest novel of Choudhury. Based mainly on the political activities and the political leaders of Pakistan and of the Indian subcontinent in a board sense, the novel covers the span from 1968 to the Liberation War of Bangladesh (1971). The novel begins with no other character than that of Bhutto and gradually reveals his true nature. The readers will also get a vivid picture of greater "Undivided Bengal", changes in the social structure, and the creation of a socialist state. The author's own experiences of tension, imagination, and dreams combined to produce a multi-faceted novel.

In Choudhury's short-stories, the writing portrays the changes in village life over time. He often portrays the London life of people from Sylhet. His writing handles a lot of characters and a wide range of time. He emphasises the physical state of human existence, and strengthening one's body and soul.

He was an understanding revolutionary in his own right, ploughing alone a firm held furrow. He carried on his revolution through revealing revelations of all surviving social practices and norms. Unlike many others of his stature, Choudhury as a man, towers far above Choudhury as a writer, though he carved out a place for himself amongst the galaxy of contemporary novelists.

== Works ==
Novels

- Nuton Diganta (New Horizon), vol 1, 1992.
- Shampan Cross (St. Pancras), 1993.
- Nuton Diganta (New Horizon), vol 2, 1994.
- Porodeshe Porpashi (Life on Distant Shores), Dhaka 2003.
- Nuton Diganta Samagra (New Horizon), Vol 1, 2, 3, Dhaka, 2005.
- Aniketan, Dhaka 2007.
- Nam Mucha Jai Na, Dhaka, 1989.

A Collection of Short-Stories

- Golpo-samvar, Dhaka, 1995 and Dhaka, 2012.
- Bideshi Bristi, Dhaka, 2001.
- Golpa-salpa, Dhaka, 2005.
- Golpa-bhuban, Dhaka, 2012.

Essays

- Ekti Jatike Hotya, Dhaka, 2003.
- Mohan Ekushe (1947–1952), Dhaka, 2007.
- Shayattoshason, shadhikar o shadhinota, 1947-1971 (History of Bangladesh), Dhaka, 2009.
- 1971 (History of Bangladesh), Vol I, Dhaka, 2012.
- 1971 (History of Bangladesh), Vol II, Dhaka, 2013.
- Smrite Ekattur, 2000.
- Rabindra and Nazrul, Dhaka, 2000.
- Nazruler Sangeet Jagat, Dhaka, 2000.
- Rabindrer Sangeet Jagat, Dhaka, 2000.
- Joge Joge Bangladesh (History of Bengal), Dhaka, 2003.
- Mohan Ekushe, Dhaka, 2008.
- Islamer Nabi, Dhaka, 1990.
- Bible and Mohammed, Dhaka, 1991.
- Dhormer Nirjash (Final words on Religion), Dhaka, 2000.
- Mohammed (Prophet of Islam), Dhaka, 2004.
- Je Kotha Bola Jai Na, Dhaka, 2007.

A Collection of poems

- 1971, London 1971.

== Chronology ==
- 1934, entered 'Khanjanpur' Primary School.
- 1936, entered 'Sherpur' English School in class three.
- 1938, entered 'Shadhuhati' Middle English School and in 1939 sat for M.E. final exam and received first division.
- 1940, completed F.E final and received first division.
- Mid 1943, his father Azhar Choudhury died.
- Late 1943, entered 'Habiganj Brindabon' College. Completed his IA in 1945 and BA in 1947.
- Late 1947, left college to work in Silchor. Started work in a shop as a bookkeeper.
- 1948, left Silchor and started teaching at 'Aaushkandi' High School.
- 1949, joined Pakistan Air Force.
- 1950, sent to Kawrangi Creek for one year of further training.
- 1951, married Shirin Choudhury.
- 1955-56, was an external candidate of the University of Dhaka, reg no P-64.
- End of 1956, went on a journey by ship with his wife to Calcutta, Colombo, and Karachi. Later moved to Kuhat with his wife.
- 1961, applied to come to Great Britain for further training as a Pakistan Air Force's Serviceman.
- 1962, first came to Bedford to work for the Royal Aircraft Establishment, Ministry of Aviation.
- 1963, founded the Bedford Pakistan Association and became the general secretary. Started writing 'A name cannot be deleted', on Islamic apologetics.
- 1964, became the member of Bedford constituency Labour Party. Started writing 'Bible and Mohammed', another research book to defend Islam.
- 1965, started making regular donations to the Pakistan Relief Fund. Started writing 'Final words on Religion', another research book to combat Muslims misinterpretation of Islam.
- 1966, became a member of the Election Commission of the National Federation of Pakistan Association of Great Britain. Left the Ministry of Aviation and returned to Bangladesh.
- 1968, started writing on the reform policy of the Madrassaha Education of Pakistan. The president of Pakistan appreciated Choudhury's reform policy and wrote '...attempts are being made to reform Madrassaha education...the process of the change has to be gradual' [a letter written to Pakistan's Education Minister, 1968]. Returned to England and joined Illist Automation, St Albans. Lived there for several years. Founded the St Albans Pakistan Association, and was the first president of the association. Started writing 'Jesus', a research book.
- 1971, founded the Bangladesh Action Committee, St Albans, and sent regular donations to Bangladesh Aid Committee and the Bangladesh Fund. He received much correspondence from the Head of the Mission of the People's republic of Bangladesh (Calcutta and London), and the High Commissioner (Calcutta), Shirley Williams MP, Nigel Fisher MC MP, Mervyn Pike MP, Victor Goodhew MP, Peter Shore MP and many others.
- 1971, joined Janomot, a Bengali newspaper, as a regular columnist and expressed his own frustration in written outbursts against the Pakistan's attack on Bangladesh. These writings were later incorporated in his book 'Blood Legacy of a Nation'.
- 1972, 18 February, received a letter from the Prime Minister Sheikh Mujibur Rahman after returning to Bangladesh.
- 1972, visited Moscow. Started writing essays on conflicts and contradictions prevailing in the social processes of the Bengali society. Later a few of these have been included in the collection of eassys.
- 1972, joined The Post Office and moved to London.
- 1974, founded Mukimpur Primary School.
- 1979, started writing his autobiography, 'My life'. End of the same year he lost his mother Nazmun Nesa Choudhury.
- 1983, Shirin Choudhury moved to Britain with their third and fourth children. Started rewriting 'New Horizon', his first novel.
- 1987, founded the King's Cross Mosque and Islamic Centre and became the chair. Started writing 'St Pancras', his second novel.
- 1988, started translating 'Prophet of Islam' by K S R Rao.
- 1989, retired from The Post Office and returned with his wife to Bangladesh.
- 1989-1996, wrote and published many of his works.
- 1990, founded Habiganj Islamic Orphans School and became Treasurer of Islamic Foundation, Habiganj.
- 1993, received Life Membership of Bangla Academy, Dhaka.
- 1993, founder and Vice President of Habiganj Shahitya Parishod. Patron of Khela Ghor, Payra, Shet Payra, Shurja Shiri, Pithua Girls' School and Mukimpur Madrasha.
- 1994, founder and president of the literary society 'Sangjojan', Habiganj.
- 1995, received Book Award.
- 1996, 23 February collapsed at the Literary Society's lecture, died at Red Cross Building, Habiganj at 11.30am.

[Source: Jibani Granthamala: A Series of Literary biographies, Bangla Academy, Dhaka, Feb 1991.]

== Smrity Award ==
Following Bengali writers and free-thinkers received Drouhee Kotha-shahitayk Abdur Rouf Choudhury 'Smrity Award' :

- Partho Sharati Choudhury (Poetry, 1997)
- Shamshuzaman Khan (Folklore, 1998)
- Razia Khan (Novel, 1999)
- Shah Abdul Karim (Music Baul, 2000)
- Farid Gazi (Bangladesh Independence War, 2001)
- Shirajul Islam Choudhury (Philosophy, 2002)
- Hasan Azizul Huq (Literature, 2003)
- Barun Ray (Politics, 2004)

== Comments and reviews ==
- Abdul Mannan Syed, New Horizon: A new direction for Bengali novels, 2004.
- Biplob Maji, A new style for the world of Bengali novels, Amritalok:106, 2006.
- Ketoki Dyson, Life on Distant Shores by A R Choudhury, Feb 2005.
- Syed Mojurul Islam, New Horizan for Bengali, Feb 2005.
- Shirajul Islam Choudhury, A R Choudhury's works, 2001.
- Hasan Azizul Huq, A free-thinker, 2003.
- Selina Hussain, Women in Choudhury's writings, 1997.
- Shamshuzaman Khan, Folk culture in Choudhury's works, 1998.
- Jibani Granthamala: A Series of Literary biographies, Bangla Academy, Dhaka, Feb 1999.
- Biletey Bish Shotoker Bangla Kobi, Rabbani Choudhury, Agamee Prakashani, Dhaka, Feb 2000.
- Silver Jubilee Commemorative Volume of Bangladesh Independence, The committee to celebrate the silver jubilee of Bangladesh Independence, London, 1997.
- Brihattar Syleter Itihas (History of Greater Sylhet) Vol.1, Brihattar Sylheter Itihas Pranayan Parished, November 1997.
- Shoto Bochorer Sangbadikota, Sylhet Itihas Pranayan Parished, Jan 1998.
- Habiganj Porikroma, Habiganj Etihash Pronoyan Parished, Bangladesh, October 1994.
- Protayo, Shahitya Porishad, 1993.
- Habiganj-er Muslim Manosh, Habiganj.
- Habiganj-er Shahitoyang, Nandalal Sharma, Jhalabad Lokashahitya Porishad, Bangladesh, December 1992.
- Aajo Onek Rohoshya, London, 1997.
- Sharak 1 (Dhaka, 1997), Sharak 2 (Dhaka, 1998), Sharak 3, (Dhaka, 1999).
