= Manik Chowdhury =

Bangladeshi politician (1933–1991)

- Born: 20 December 1933; Bahubal, Habiganj
- Died: 10 January 1991 (aged 57); Dhaka
- Citizenship: Bangladesh
- Known for: Freedom fighter, politician
- Awards: Independence Day Award (2015)

Manik Chowdhury (20 December 1933 – 10 January 1991) was a Bangladeshi politician and veteran of the Bangladesh Liberation War. He received the Independence Award in 2015 for his contributions during the conflict.

== Early life ==
Chowdhury was born on 20 December 1933 in Bahubal thana, Habiganj District, Assam, British India.

== Career ==
Chowdhury played a role in the Bangladesh Liberation War in the greater Sylhet region and helped organize the Mukti Bahini. He led the looting of Habiganj government arsenal and in early April took direct part in the Sherpur-Sadipur battle. He was awarded the title of "Commandant" despite being a civilian.

Chowdhury was elected Member of the National Assembly from Habiganj in the 1970 general election. He was also elected Member of Parliament by the Awami League in 1973 and was also the governor of Habiganj Sub-Division. He was the Agriculture Secretary of the Central Executive Parliament of the Awami League. After the assassination of President Sheikh Mujibur Rahman, Chowdhury was arrested for protesting and imprisoned for four years.

== Death and legacy ==
When Chowdhury fell ill, due to lack of necessary funds for proper treatment he was not allotted a seat in any ward of PG Hospital. He died on 10 January 1991.

His daughter, advocate Amatul Kibria Keya Chowdhury represented Habiganj district as a Member of Parliament.

== Awards ==
Chowdhury was received the "Bangabandhu Krishi Padak" from Sheikh Mujibur Rahman in 1974 for the "Shyamal" project.

Chowdhury was Posthumously awarded the Independence Award in 2015 in recognition for his contribution to the Bangladesh Liberation war.
