= Chowdhury Abdul Hai =

Bangladeshi politician

Member of Bangladesh Parliament
- In office 1986–1988
- Succeeded by: Abu Lais Md. Mubin Chowdhury

Personal details
- Party: Bangladesh Nationalist Party

Chowdhury Abdul Hai is a Bangladesh Nationalist Party politician and a former member of parliament for Habiganj-3.

== Career ==
Hai was elected to parliament from Habiganj-3 as a Bangladesh Nationalist Party candidate in 1986.
