= Najmul Hasan Zahed =

Bangladeshi politician

Member of Bangladesh Parliament
- In office 2001–2006
- Preceded by: Suranjit Sengupta
- Succeeded by: Md. Abdul Majid Khan

Personal details
- Born: 1930; Kamalkhani, Baniachong, Habiganj
- Died: 16 August 2010 (aged 79–80); Apollo Hospital Dhaka
- Political party: Bangladesh Awami League

Najmul Hasan Zahed was a Bangladesh Awami League politician and a member of parliament for Habiganj-2.

== Birth and family life ==
Zahed was born and raised in a Bengali Muslim zamindar family in the village of Kamalkhani in Habiganj's Baniachong Upazila. His father was Siddiq Hasan, his mother was Syeda Sufya Khatun. His older brother is Fazle Hasan Abed, the founder of BRAC, the world's largest non-governmental organisation. He was the director of the Bangladesh National Tea Company (NTC).

== Career ==
Zahed was elected to parliament from Habiganj-2 as a Bangladesh Awami League candidate in 2001.

== Death and legacy ==
Zahed died of old age at the Apollo Hospital Dhaka on 16 August 2010 at age 80. He was buried in the Hasan family graveyard in Baniachong. The Najmul Hasan Zahed Academy was named after him.
