= Masudul Haq =

Bangladeshi army officer and politician

Adviser for Health, Labour and Social Welfare
- In office 18 June 1976 – 12 August 1977
- President: ASM Sayem; Ziaur Rahman (acting)
- Preceded by: Muhammad Ibrahim
- Succeeded by: A. Q. M. Badruddoza Chowdhury (Health); Himself (Labour)

Adviser for Manpower Development, Labour and Social Welfare
- In office 12 August – 8 December 1977
- President: Ziaur Rahman (acting)
- Preceded by: Himself (Labour)
- Succeeded by: Zakaria Khan Chowdhury

Personal details
- Born: British India
- Died: Bangladesh

Military service
- Allegiance: Pakistan (before 1971); Bangladesh
- Branch/service: Pakistan Army; Bangladesh Army
- Rank: Colonel
- Unit: East Bengal Regiment

Colonel (retd.) Md. Masudul Haq (Bengali: মসুদুল হক) was a Bangladeshi Army officer and an adviser for the labor ministry in the advisory council of presidents Abu Sadat Mohammad Sayem and Major General Ziaur Rahman until 1977.
