= Abu Mansur Sakhawat Hasan =

Bangladeshi politician

Abu Mansur Sakhawat Hassan
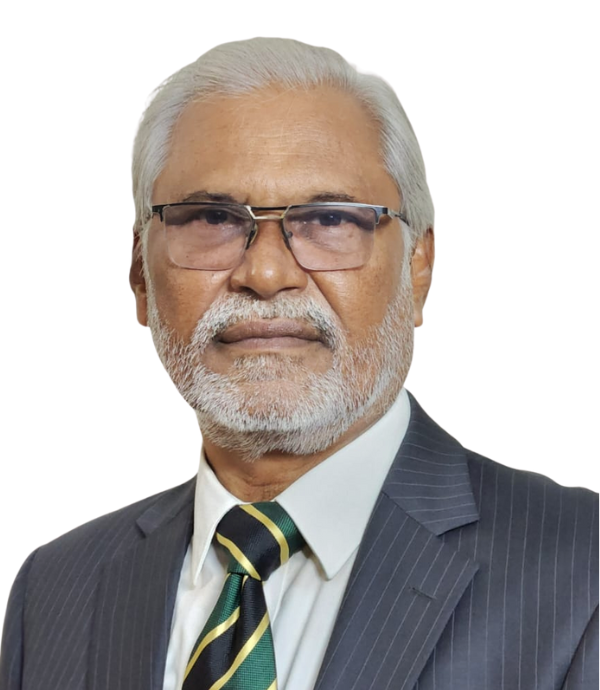
- Preceded by: Moyez Uddin Sharif Ruel

Member of Parliament for Habiganj-2
- Incumbent
- Assumed office 17 February 2026

Personal details
- Born: 5 December 1956 (age 69) Kamalkhani, Baniachong Upazila, Habiganj District, Bangladesh
- Party: Bangladesh Nationalist Party
- Spouse: Rabia Sultana
- Children: 3
- Occupation: Physician

Abu Mansur Sakhawat Hasan Jibon is a Bangladesh Nationalist Party politician and a member of Jatiya Sangsad representing the Habiganj-2 constituency.

== Early life and education ==
He was born on 5 December 1956 in Kamalkhani village under Baniachang of Habiganj District to his father Tayebul Hasan and mother Forezunnesa Hasan.

Sakhawat Hasan and Rabeya Sultana are blessed with two sons and one daughter.

== Political life ==
Abu Mansur Sakhawat Hasan contested the 2008 Bangladeshi general election.he is a politician from Habiganj. In the 2026 Thirteenth National Parliamentary election, he received 126583 votes, while his closest rival, Abdul Bachit Azad, received 65762 votes. As a result, he won the Habiganj-2 seat in the Thirteenth National Parliamentary election representing the Bangladesh Nationalist Party.
