= Sharif Uddin Ahmed =

Bangladeshi politician

Member of Bangladesh Parliament
- In office 1991–1996
- Preceded by: Sirajul Islam Khan
- Succeeded by: Sharif Uddin Ahmed
- In office 1996–1997
- Preceded by: Sharif Uddin Ahmed
- Succeeded by: Suranjit Sengupta

Personal details
- Born: March 7, 1942 Jatrapasha, Habiganj subdistrict
- Died: August 6, 1997 (aged 55)
- Party: Bangladesh Awami League

Google Terms of Service

Sharif Uddin Ahmed was a Bangladesh Awami League politician and a member of parliament for Habiganj-2.

== Early life and education ==
Sharif Uddin Ahmed was born on 7 March 1942 to Didar Baksh in Jatrapasha village of what is now Baniachong Upazila of Habiganj District. He matriculated from L. R. Government High School in 1967. He earned an MA from the Institute of Education and Research and an LLB from the University of Dhaka in 1971.

== Career ==
Sharif Uddin Ahmed was elected to parliament from Habiganj-2 as a Bangladesh Awami League candidate in 1991 and 1996. He was the president of the Habiganj District Awami League.

== Death ==
Ahmed died on 6 August 1997.
