= Atiq Ullah (politician) =

Bangladeshi politician

Member of Bangladesh Parliament
- In office 15 February 1996 – 12 June 1996

Personal details
- Party: Bangladesh Nationalist Party

Atiq Ullah (Bengali: আতিক উল্লাহ) is a Bangladesh Nationalist Party politician and a former member of parliament for Habiganj-3.

== Career ==
Ullah was elected to parliament from Habiganj-3 as a Bangladesh Nationalist Party candidate on 15 February 1996.
