= Abdul Moshabbir =

Bangladeshi politician (c.1938–2018)

- আব্দুল মোছাব্বির

Member of Parliament for Habiganj-1
- In office 3 March 1988 – 6 December 1990
- Preceded by: Ismat Ahmed Chowdhury
- Succeeded by: Khalilur Rahman Chowdhury

Personal details
- Born: c. 1938 Habiganj District
- Died: 28 November 2018 Habiganj
- Party: Awami League
- Other political affiliations: JSD

Abdul Moshabbir (c. 1938-28 November 2018) was a politician of Habiganj district of Bangladesh, lawyer, and a member of parliament from Habiganj-1.

== Birth and early life ==
Abdul Moshabbir was born in 1938 in Srimatpur village of Kaliar Bhanga Union in Nabiganj upazila of Habiganj district of Sylhet Division.

== Career ==
Abdul Moshabbir was a lawyer who was the president of Habiganj District Awami Bar Association. He was the president of Habiganj district bar and general secretary of the district bar. He was elected to parliament from Habiganj-1 as a Jatiya Samajtantrik Dal (JASAD) In 1988 Bangladeshi general election.

He lost the Jatiya Sangsad elections of 1991 Habiganj-1 constituency with the nomination of Jatiya Samajtantrik Dal-JSD. He then joined the Awami League.

== Death ==
Abdul Moshabbir died on 28 November 2018 in Habiganj.
