= Ismat Ahmed Chowdhury =

Bangladeshi politician

Member of Bangladesh Parliament
- In office 1986–1988
- Preceded by: Dewan Mahbubur Rob Sadi Chaudhuri
- Succeeded by: Abdul Moshabbir

Personal details
- Born: Nabiganj
- Party: Bangladesh Awami League

Ismat Ahmed Chowdhury is a Bangladesh Awami League politician and a former member of parliament for Habiganj-1. He was an organizer of the Bangladesh Liberation War.

== Career ==
Chowdhury fought in the Bangladesh Liberation War. He was elected to parliament from Habiganj-1 as a Bangladesh Awami League candidate in 1986.
