= Jarati Tanchangya =

Bangladeshi politician

- জ্বরতী তঞ্চঙ্গ্যা

Member of the Bangladesh Parliament for Reserved women's seat-48
- In office 28 February 2024 – 6 August 2024
- Preceded by: Sayeda Rubina Akter

Personal details
- Born: 1 January 1980 (age 46)
- Party: Bangladesh Awami League

Jarati Tanchangya (born 1 January 1980) is a Awami League politician and a Jatiya Sangsad member from a women's reserved for Rangamati District.
