= G K Gouse =

Bangladeshi politician

- জি কে গউছ

Member of the Bangladesh Parliament for Habiganj-3
- Incumbent
- Assumed office 17 February 2026
- Preceded by: Md. Abu Zahir

Personal details
- Born: 20 April 1968 (age 58) Habiganj Sadar Upazila, Habiganj District
- Party: Bangladesh Nationalist Party

G K Gouse is a Bangladeshi politician of the Bangladesh Nationalist Party. He is currently serving as a member of parliament from Habiganj-3.

== Early life ==
Gouse was born on 20 April in 1968 at Habiganj Sadar Upazila under Habiganj District.
