= Sayeda Rubina Akter =

Bangladeshi politician

- সৈয়দা রুবিনা আকতার

Member of the Bangladesh Parliament for Reserved women's seat-28
- In office 20 February 2019 – 29 January 2024
- Preceded by: Amatul Kibria Keya
- Succeeded by: Gyorvati Tanchangya

Personal details
- Born: 6 March 1975 (age 51)
- Party: Bangladesh Awami League
- Education: B.A., L.L.B
- Occupation: Politician and lawyer

Sayeda Rubina Akter (6 March 1975), also known as Meera, is a Bangladesh Awami League politician and a former member of the Bangladesh Parliament from a reserved seat. She was a member of the standing committee on the aviation ministry.

== Early life and education ==
Akter was born on 6 March 1975. Her father was Sayed Monower Hossain. Akter is married to Musharraf Hossain Sardar, former elected GS of Shahid Sergeant Zahurul Haq Hall and former assistant editor of the Awami League Sub-Committee.

== Career ==
Akter was elected to parliament from reserved seat as a Bangladesh Awami League candidate in 2019.
