= Khalilur Rahman Chowdhury (Bangladeshi politician) =

Bangladeshi politician

Member of Bangladesh Parliament
- In office 1991–1996
- Preceded by: Abdul Moshabbir
- Succeeded by: Sheikh Sujat Mia

Personal details
- Died: June 2013
- Party: Bangladesh Nationalist Party; Jatiya Party (Ershad)

Khalilur Rahman Chowdhury is a Bangladeshi politician and former member of parliament from Habiganj-1.

== Career ==
Chowdhury was the joint secretary general of the Jatiya Party and the president of the Habiganj district unit of the party. He was elected to parliament from Habiganj-1 as a Jatiya Party candidate in 1991. He then joined the Bangladesh Nationalist Party (BNP). He lost the seventh national election in June 1996 from the same seat.

== Death ==
Khalilur Rahman Chowdhury died in June 2013.
