= Sirajul Hossain Khan =

Bangladeshi politician

Member of Bangladesh Parliament

Personal details
- Born: 17 July 1926 Baniachang
- Died: 17 February 2007 (aged 80) Baniachang
- Party: Jatiya Party

Sirajul Hossain Khan (1926–2007) was a Jatiya Party politician, government minister, and member of parliament for Habiganj-2.

== Early life ==
Khan was born on 17 July 1926, in Baniachong village, Baniachong Upazila, Habiganj subdivision, Sylhet district (of Assam), British Raj.

== Career ==
Khan served in the Bangladesh Liberation War in the Bangladesh Muktijuddha Samannay Parishad. He was elected to the parliament from Habiganj-2 as a Jatiya Party candidate in 1986 and 1988 and was a cabinet minister (1985–1990). He served as the bureau chief of the Pakistan Times in Dacca and was the founder editor of the Eastern News Agency (ENA). He was a trade unionist who served as the general secretary of the East Pakistan Journalists Union and the Bangladesh Sramik Federation.

== Death ==
Khan died in Dhaka on 17 February 2007.
