= Abdul Munim Chowdhury =

Bangladeshi diplomat and politician

Mohammad Abdul Munim Chowdhury
- মোহাম্মদ আব্দুল মুনিম চৌধুরী

Member of the Bangladesh Parliament for Habiganj-1
- In office 14 January 2014 – 7 January 2019
- Preceded by: Sheikh Sujat Mia
- Succeeded by: Gazi Mohammad Shahnawaz

Personal details
- Born: 1 November 1967 (age 58)
- Party: Jatiya Party

Mohammad Abdul Munim Chowdhury (Bengali: মোহাম্মদ আব্দুল মুনিম চৌধুরী) is a Bangladeshi politician and businessman. He was the former MP of Habiganj-1, representing the Jatiya Party.

== Early life ==
Chowdhury was born on 1 November 1967. He has an H.S.C degree.

== Career ==
Chowdhury was elected to parliament on 5 January 2014 from Habiganj-1 as a Jatiya Party candidate.
