= Habiganj-3 =

Constituency of Bangladesh's Jatiya Sangsad

Coordinates: 24.37°N 91.42°E

- Constituency for the Jatiya Sangsad
- District: Habiganj District
- Division: Sylhet Division
- Electorate: 326,823 (2018)

Current constituency
- Created: 1984
- Party: Bangladesh Nationalist Party
- Member: G K Gouse
- ← 240 Habiganj-2 242 Habiganj-4 →

Habiganj-3 is a constituency represented in the Jatiya Sangsad (National Parliament) of Bangladesh since 2026 by G K Gouse of the Bangladesh Nationalist Party.

== Boundaries ==
The constituency encompasses Habiganj Sadar and Lakhai upazilas.

== History ==
The constituency was created in 1984 from a Sylhet constituency when the former Sylhet District was split into four districts: Sunamganj, Sylhet, Moulvibazar, and Habiganj.

== Members of Parliament ==
Election	Member	Party
1986	Chowdhury Abdul Hai	Awami League
1988	Abu Lais Md. Mubin Chowdhury	Jatiya Party
Feb 1996	Atiq Ullah	Bangladesh Nationalist Party
Jun 1996	Abu Lais Md. Mubin Chowdhury	Jatiya Party
2001	Shah A. M. S. Kibria	Awami League
2005 by-election	Abu Lais Md. Mubin Chowdhury	Bangladesh Nationalist Party
2008	Md. Abu Zahir	Awami League
2014	Md. Abu Zahir	Awami League
2018	Md. Abu Zahir	Awami League
2024	Md. Abu Zahir	Awami League
2026	G K Gouse	Bangladesh Nationalist Party

== Elections ==
=== Elections in the 2010s ===
General Election 2014: Habiganj-3
Party	Candidate	Votes	%	±%
AL	Md. Abu Zahir	98,155	82.5	+12.1
JP(E)	Mohammad Atikur Rahman	20,837	17.5	N/A
Majority		77,318	65.0	+21.9
Turnout		118,992	41.5	−43.5
AL hold				

=== Elections in the 2000s ===
General Election 2008: Habiganj-3
Party	Candidate	Votes	%	±%
AL	Md. Abu Zahir	147,827	70.4	
BNP	Abu Lais Md. Mubin Chowdhury	57,260	27.3	
NAP	Md. Syedur Rahman	1,949	0.9	
BIF	Md. Shohidul Islam	1,445	0.7	
IAB	Hafiz Md. Abdul Karim	1,307	0.6	
KSJL	Md. Nurual Haque	269	0.1	
Majority		90,567	43.1	
Turnout		210,057	82.7	
AL gain from BNP				

Shah A. M. S. Kibria was assassinated on 27 January 2005. Abu Lais Md. Mubin Chowdhury of the BNP was elected unopposed in April, after the four other candidates withdrew from the by-election scheduled for later that month.

General Election 2001: Habiganj-3
Party	Candidate	Votes	%	±%
AL	Shah A. M. S. Kibria	83,110	47.7	+12.5
BNP	Abu Lais Md. Mubin Chowdhury	69,306	39.8	+35.5
IJOF	Md. Azizul Haque	19,797	11.4	N/A
BIF	Md. Shohidul Islam	781	0.4	−0.2
Jatiya Party (M)	Md. Shafiqul Islam	398	0.2	N/A
Independent	Azizur Rahman Chowdhury	387	0.2	N/A
CPB	Hirendra Datta	235	0.1	N/A
Independent	Syed Md. Mujakkir Hossain	150	0.1	N/A
BKSMA (Sadeq)	Md. Apel Mahmud Dulal	121	0.1	N/A
Majority		13,804	7.9	−0.1
Turnout		174,285	73.9	+2.7
AL gain from JP(E)				

=== Elections in the 1990s ===
General Election June 1996: Habiganj-3
Party	Candidate	Votes	%	±%
JP(E)	Abu Lais Md. Mubin Chowdhury	55,795	43.1	+2.3
AL	Shahid Uddin Chowdhury	45,493	35.2	N/A
Bangladesh Jatiyatabadi Awami League (Mostofa Allama)	Syed Md. Kaisar	10,773	8.3	N/A
Independent	Md. Nizam Uddin	6,436	5.0	N/A
BNP	Md. Atique Ullah	5,505	4.3	−8.4
Jamaat	Syed Shah Alam Hossain	2,670	2.1	−2.9
Gano Forum	Chowdhury Ashraful Bari Noman	1,391	1.1	N/A
BIF	Noman Ahmed Khan	765	0.6	N/A
Independent	Md. A. Rezzak	551	0.4	N/A
Majority		10,302	8.0	+0.3
Turnout		129,379	71.2	+23.8
JP(E) hold				

General Election 1991: Habiganj-3
Party	Candidate	Votes	%	±%
JP(E)	Abu Lais Md. Mubin Chowdhury	38,260	40.8	
NAP (Muzaffar)	Chowdhury Abdul Hai	31,045	33.1	
BNP	Atik Ullah	11,927	12.7	
Independent	M. A. Mottalib	4,709	5.0	
Jamaat	Syed Shah Alam Hossain	4,707	5.0	
Independent	Azizur Rahman Chowdhury	1,406	1.5	
Independent	Md. Tazul Islam	537	0.6	
Zaker Party	Mufti Abu Naser	480	0.5	
FP	Syed Ebadul Hasan	395	0.4	
Jatiya Samajtantrik Dal-JSD	Abu Taher	283	0.3	
Majority		7,215	7.7	
Turnout		93,749	47.4	
JP(E) hold				
