= Shah A M S Kibria =

Bangladeshi politician (1931–2005)

- শাহ এ এম এস কিবরিয়া

Minister of Finance
- In office 23 June 1996 – 15 July 2001
- Prime Minister: Sheikh Hasina
- Preceded by: Saifur Rahman
- Succeeded by: Saifur Rahman

Member of the Bangladesh Parliament for Habiganj-3
- In office 2001 – January 27, 2005
- Preceded by: Abu Lais Md. Mubin Chowdhury
- Succeeded by: Abu Lais Md. Mubin Chowdhury

Executive Secretary of ESCAP
- In office 1981–1992
- Preceded by: J B P Maramis
- Succeeded by: Rafeeuddin Ahmed

Foreign Secretary
- In office 1978–1981
- Preceded by: Tabarak Hussain
- Succeeded by: Humayun Rashid Choudhury

Personal details
- Born: Shah Abu Muhammad Shamsul Kibria; 1 May 1931 Sylhet, Assam, British India
- Died: 27 January 2005 (aged 73) Habiganj, Sylhet, Bangladesh
- Cause of death: Assassination
- Party: Bangladesh Awami League
- Education: Dhaka University; Fletcher School of Law and Diplomacy
- Awards: Independence Day Award

Shah Abu Muhammad Shamsul Kibria (Bengali: শাহ্‌ আবু মুহাম্মদ শামসুল কিবরিয়া; 1 May 1931 – 27 January 2005), known as SAMS Kibria or Shams Kibria, was a Bangladeshi economist, diplomat and politician.

Joining the Foreign Service of Pakistan in 1954, Kibria served in a number of diplomatic missions for Pakistan. In 1971, at the height of the Bangladesh Liberation War, Kibria, an ethnic Sylheti, dissociated himself from the Pakistani foreign service and declared allegiance to the Mujibnagar government. After the independence of Bangladesh, he served as the Director General of the Political Affairs department of the Ministry of Foreign Affairs of Bangladesh and twice as the foreign secretary of Bangladesh. Between 1981 and 1992, Kibria was the executive secretary of the UN Economic and Social Commission for Asia and the Pacific (ESCAP).

Kibria joined the Awami League in 1992. He served as the minister of finance of the Bangladesh government led by Sheikh Hasina from 1996 to 2001. In the 2001 general election of Bangladesh, he was elected a member of the parliament from his constituency Habiganj-3 in 2001 until his assassination in 2005.

== Early life and education ==
Kibria was born on 1 May 1931 in Sylhet District of Assam Province. His father, Shah Imtiaz Ali, was a pioneer in the field of primary education in the greater Sylhet region. Kibria studied at Habiganj Government High School. He graduated in economics from Dhaka University in 1952. In the same year, he was arrested for his involvement in the Bengali language movement and was imprisoned for a month. After obtaining his master's degree in economics from Dhaka University in 1953, Kibria topped the Central Superior Services Examination of the Pakistan government in 1954 and was selected for the Pakistan Foreign Service. He received training for diplomatic service at the Fletcher School of Law and Diplomacy at Tufts University in Boston, US, and the British Foreign Office in London, UK.

== Career ==
=== Diplomatic career ===
Kibria served in Pakistan's diplomatic missions in Calcutta, Cairo, UN mission, New York, Tehran and Jakarta. He was also appointed to the Ministry of Foreign Affairs in Islamabad and the Pakistan Embassy in Washington D.C. During the liberation war, Kibria was serving as political counselor in the Pakistan Embassy, Washington DC. On 4 August 1971, he, along with his Bengali colleagues, quit the Pakistan embassy and declared allegiance to the interim Bangladesh government. He took part in organizing a Bangladesh mission in Washington, DC, and mobilizing public opinion in support of Bangladesh. He also issued a bulletin to inform the international community about the progress of Bangladeshi forces in the war.

After the war, Kibria joined the newly established Ministry of Foreign Affairs of Bangladesh in Dhaka as director general of the political affairs department. He also held the post of foreign secretary in the Ministry of Administration. In January 1973, he was appointed high commissioner to Australia, New Zealand and Fiji. He was appointed the Permanent Representative of Bangladesh to the European office of the UN in Geneva in 1976. He returned to Bangladesh as foreign secretary in 1978. During this time, he authored the concept paper for SAARC and helped drive it to fruition. In 1979, Kibria served as the elected chairman of the Group of 77 Preparatory Committee for the United Nations Conference on Trade and Development V held in Manila. From May 1981 to March 1992, Kibria held the post of executive secretary of the UN Economic and Social Commission for Asia and the Pacific (ESCAP). He also assumed the additional assignment of special representative of the UN Secretary-General for Cambodian humanitarian relief in 1986.

=== Political career ===
After the UN assignments, Kibria returned to Bangladesh in 1992. He started to take an interest in politics and joined the Bangladesh Awami League in September as a member of the advisory council. At the same time, he started writing columns on economic and political issues in the national dailies. In 1994, he was appointed political advisor to the Awami League president. After the general election on 12 June 1996, Kibria joined the cabinet of Prime Minister Sheikh Hasina as minister of finance. He served in this capacity until the government's term expired in July 2001.

Kibria was elected chairman of the Economic and Social Commission for Asia and the Pacific, 1997 annual session. He was also elected president of the Governing Council of International Fund for Agricultural Development in 1998.

In the general election on 1 October 2001, Kibria was elected a member of parliament for the Habiganj-3 constituency.

=== Term as finance minister ===
Kibria's five-year term was marked by economic progress and stability, the only exception being a stock market failure in 1996. During his term (1996–2001) Bangladesh achieved, for the first time, an average GDP growth rate of 5.83%. The average rate of inflation was well below 5%. The inflation rate in June 2001 was only 1.53%. Exports rose from $3884m in 1995–96 to $6477m in 2000–2001. Investment in the social sector, (education, health etc.) increased from 21.02% of the total budget in 1995–96 to 24.7% in 2000–2001. The rate of national savings increased over the five-year period of the Awami League from 20.17 to 23.78 percent. Similarly, the rate of investment increased from 19.99% in 1995–96 to 23.63% in 2000–2001. The physical infrastructure was improved and modernized. Electricity generating capacity rose from 2105 megawatts to 3600 megawatts. Rice and wheat production in 1995–96 was 190.6 m metric tons. In 2000–2001 the figure rose to 264.91 tons and for the first time in half a century, Bangladesh achieved food self-sufficiency.

Expectation of life at birth rose from 58.7 years in 1995–96 to 61.8 years in 2000–2001. Per capita calorie intake went up from 2206.1 to 2274.2 kilocalories in rural areas and from 2220.2 to 2283.3 kilocalories in urban areas during his term as finance minister. The literacy rate for 15 old and above was 47.3 percent in 1995–96; the rate went up to 64 percent in 2000. Infant mortality rate, which was 67 per thousand in 1995–96, went down in 1998 to 57 per thousand live births.

== Death ==
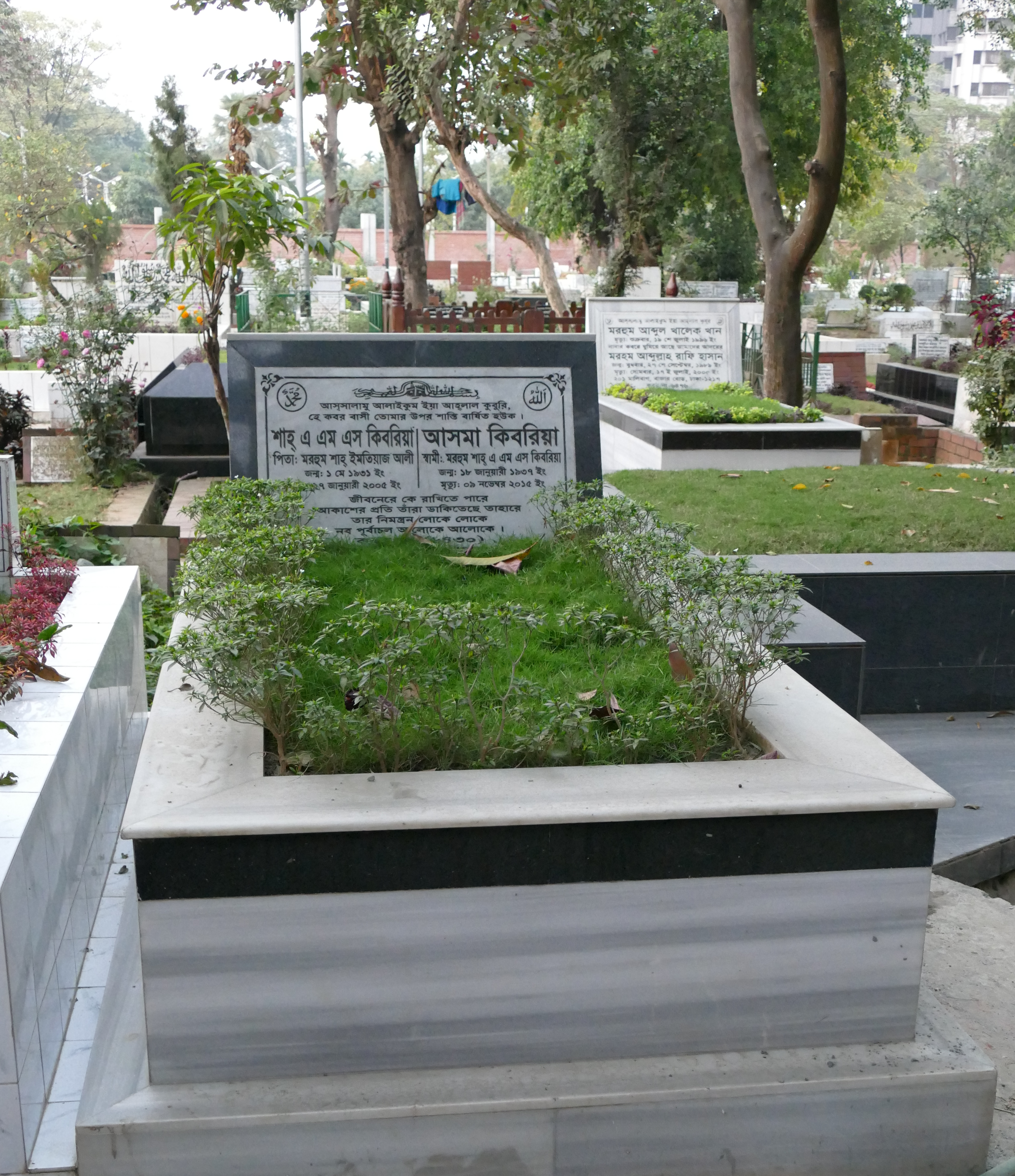
Shah A M S Kibria's grave in Banani graveyard

On the afternoon of 27 January 2005, Kibria addressed a political rally at Boidder Bazar Primary School, Habiganj. After the speech, as he was exiting the grounds through the school gate, two Arges grenades exploded in quick succession. Three of his companions, including his nephew Shah Manjurul Huda, died instantly. Kibria was taken to hospitals at Habiganj and Madhabpur, but no treatment was possible because of lack of personnel and medical supplies. He was then taken to the BIRDEM hospital in Dhaka, about 105 miles away from the place of occurrence. As the ambulance carrying Kibria reached BIRDEM, the doctors on duty declared him dead.

The role of the security forces, government officials and medical personnel of Habiganj spurred controversy. The Bangladesh Awami League, Kibria's party, organised anti-government protests and countrywide strikes in protest of the killing. The family members of Kibria called for a non-violent movement in Dhaka demanding justice. On 21 March 2005, the police charged ten people with the Habiganj bombing. Kibria's denounced the charges, alleging that they were part of a cover-up to protect the real culprits. One of the accused assassins was Ariful Haque Choudhury. Choudhury, when arrested in 2014 after a trial took place in Habiganj, was the mayor of the Sylhet City Corporation.

== Writings ==
Kibria regularly wrote columns in national dailies addressing economic and political issues. He was the founder and editor of the weekly Mridu Bhashan. He authored four books –

- Mridubhashan (1997)
- The Emerging New World Order (1999)
- Bangladesh at the Crossroads (1999)
- Chitta Jetha Bhoyshunya

== Personal life ==
Kibria was married to Asma Kibria (1937 – 2015). Their son Reza Kibria is an economist, and daughter Nazli Kibria is a professor of sociology at Boston University.

== Legacy ==
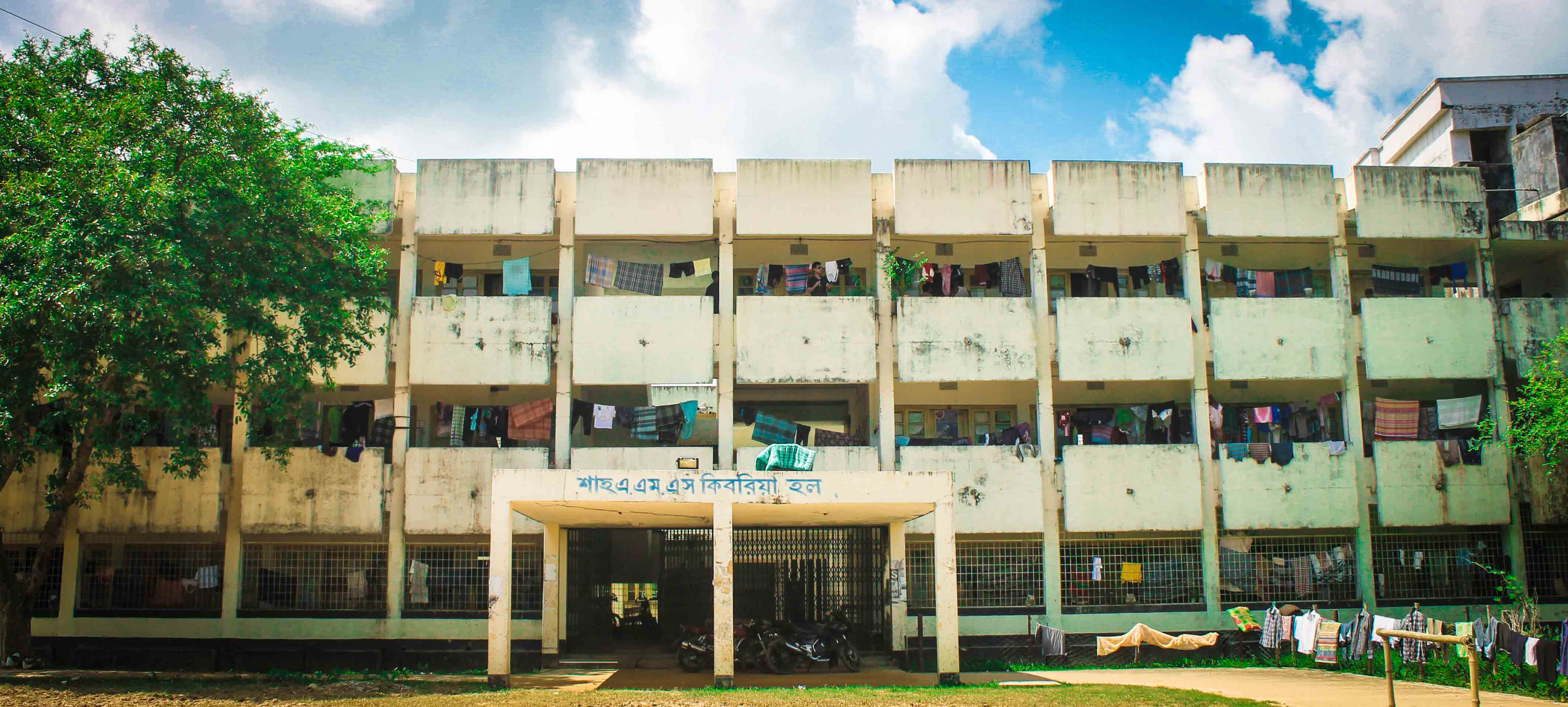
Shah AMS Kibria Hall, Sylhet Agricultural University

Sylhet Agricultural University has a residential hall named after Kibria.
