= Ajmiriganj Upazila =

Ajmiriganj আজমিরিগঞ্জ
- Upazila
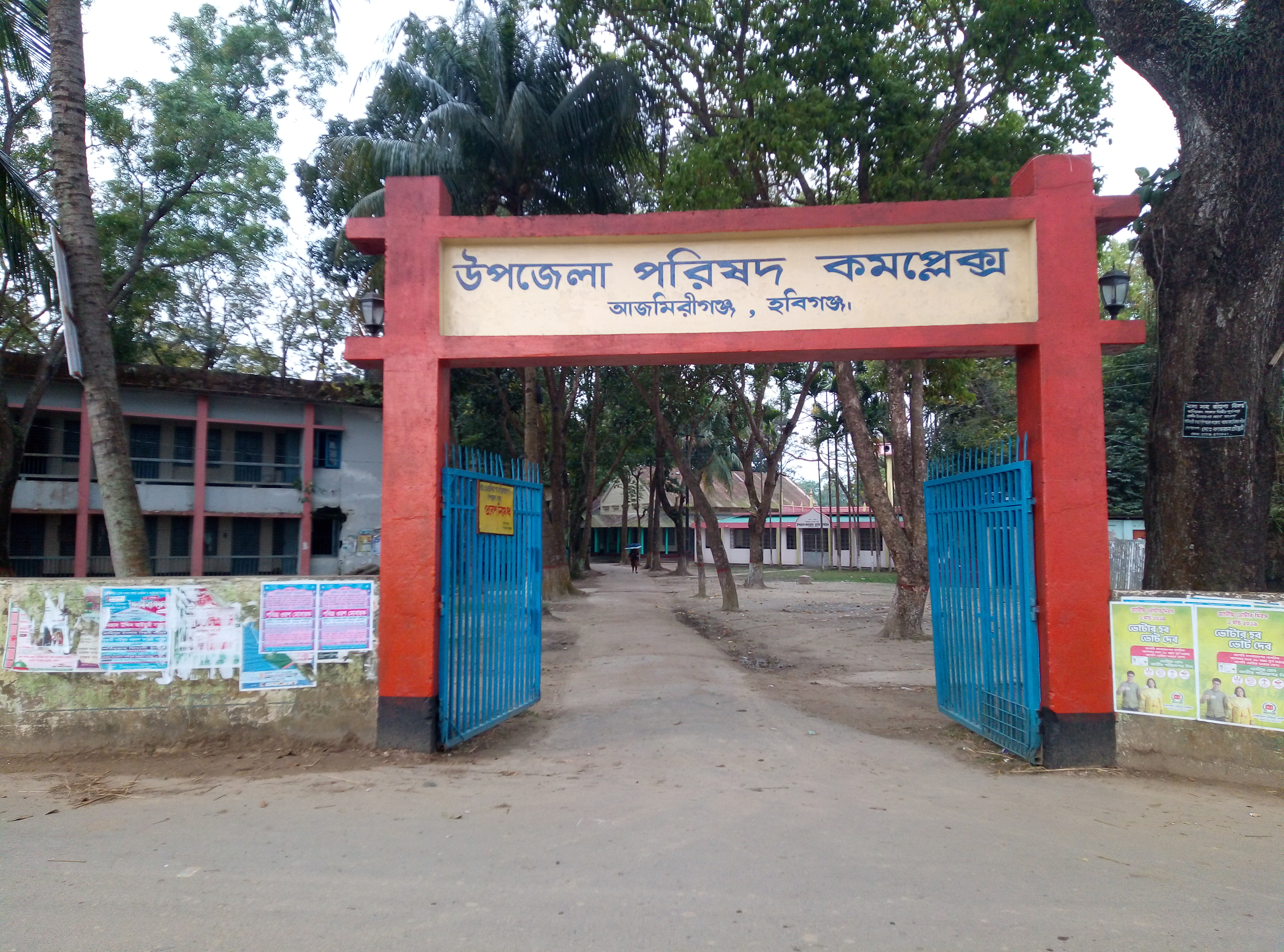
- Ajmiriganj Upazila Parishad Complex, Ajmiriganj

- Coordinates: 24°32.8′N 91°15′E
- Country: Bangladesh
- Division: Sylhet
- District: Habiganj

Area
  - Total: 223.98 km^{2} (86.48 sq mi)

Population (2022)
  - Total: 126,324
  - Density: 564.00/km^{2} (1,460.7/sq mi)
- Demonyms: Ajmiriganji, Ajmirigonji
- Time zone: UTC+6 (BST)
- Postal code: 3360
- Website: ajmiriganj.habiganj.gov.bd

Ajmiriganj Upazila mauza geocode map

Ajmiriganj (Bengali: আজমিরিগঞ্জ, is an upazila of Habiganj District in the Division of Sylhet, Bangladesh.

== History ==
In 1254, the Governor of Bengal Malik Ikhtiyaruddin Iuzbak invaded the Azmardan Raj (present-day Ajmiriganj). He defeated the local Raja. This was long before the Conquest of Sylhet in 1303. In the 1800s, a Sufi saint who was stationed at the Ajmer Sharif Dargah of Moinuddin Chishti, migrated to modern-day Ajmiriganj. His name was Syed Ishaq Chishti, and the locals referred to him as Ajmiri Baba (Baba of Ajmer). After the death of Ishaq, a government gazette notified that Abidabad thana would be renamed Ajmiriganj (Ganj of Ajmiri) in honour of Ishaq in circa 1907. Ajmiriganj amalgamated Bir Charan Govt Pilot High School was established in 1930. In 1983, Ajmiriganj thana was turned into an upazila. The names were changed from Aijadam > Ajmardan > Aijmadam > Abidabaad > Ajmiriganj.

During the Bangladesh Liberation War of 1971, an eighteen hour long encounter between the freedom fighters and the Pakistan Army took place on 16 November. 11 innocent villagers as well as freedom fighter Jagat Joity Das were killed.

== Geography ==
Ajmiriganj is located at 24.5472°N 91.2500°E. It has a total area of 223.98 km^{2}. Ajmiriganj Bazar (main town), on the other hand, consists of 2 mouzas, with an area of 5.73 km^{2}. The town has one Dak-Bungalow and a number of buildings dating from as early as the 1800s; some financed by the Maharaja of Tripura.

== Demographics ==
Historical population
Year	Pop. (000)	±%
1981	76	—
1991	87	+14.5%
2001	99	+13.8%
2011	114	+15.2%
2022	126	+10.5%
Source: Bangladesh Bureau of Statistics

According to the 2022 Bangladeshi census, Ajmiriganj Upazila had 25,203 households and a population of 126,324. 11.97% of the population were under 5 years of age. Ajmiriganj had a literacy rate (age 7 and over) of 63.71%: 64.86% for males and 62.60% for females, and a sex ratio of 97.25 males for every 100 females. 15,282 (12.10%) lived in urban areas.

According to the 2011 Census of Bangladesh, Ajmiriganj Upazila had 21,293 households and a population of 114,265. 35,070 (30.69%) were under 10 years of age. Ajmiriganj had a literacy rate (age 7 and over) of 37.06%, compared to the national average of 51.8%, and a sex ratio of 1018 females per 1000 males. 14,900 (13.04%) lived in urban areas.

=== Religion ===
Religions in Ajmiriganj Upazila (2022)
Religion	Percent
Islam	76.01%
Hinduism	23.98%
Other or not stated	0.01%

Population by religion in Union/Paurashava
Upazila	Muslim	Hindu	Others
Ajmiriganj Paurashava	9,688	3,631	5
Ajmiriganj Union	8,279	1,790	0
Badalpur Union	6,168	18,432	5
Badalpur Union	13,602	2,622	1
Kakailchheo Union	27,794	2,747	1
Shibpasha Union	30,485	974	0

🟩 Muslim majority 🟧 Hindu majority

== Administration ==
Ajmiriganj Upazila is divided into Ajmiriganj Municipality and five union parishads: Ajmiriganj, Badalpur, Jolsuka, Kakailsao, and Shibpasha. The union parishads are subdivided into 68 mauzas and 133 villages.

Ajmiriganj is part of the Habiganj-2 constituency in the Bangladesh Parliament.

== See also ==
- Upazilas of Bangladesh
- Districts of Bangladesh
- Divisions of Bangladesh
