= Habiganj-1 =

Constituency of Bangladesh's Jatiya Sangsad

Coordinates: 24.57°N 91.51°E

- Constituency for the Jatiya Sangsad
- District: Habiganj District
- Division: Sylhet Division
- Electorate: 365,018 (2018)

Current constituency
- Created: 1984
- Party: Bangladesh Nationalist Party
- Member: Reza Kibria
- Created from: Sylhet-8
- ← 238 Moulvibazar-4 240 Habiganj-2 →

Habiganj-1 is a constituency represented in the Jatiya Sangsad (National Parliament) of Bangladesh since 2026 by Reza Kibria of the Bangladesh Nationalist Party.

== Boundaries ==
The constituency encompasses Bahubal and Nabiganj upazilas.

== History ==
The constituency was created in 1984 from the Sylhet-8 constituency when the former Sylhet District was split into four districts: Sunamganj, Sylhet, Moulvibazar, and Habiganj.

Ahead of the 2008 general election, the Election Commission redrew constituency boundaries to reflect population changes revealed by the 2001 Bangladesh census. The 2008 redistricting altered the boundaries of the constituency.

== Members of Parliament ==
Election	Member	Party
1986	Ismat Ahmed Chowdhury	Awami League
1988	Abdul Moshabbir	Jatiya Samajtantrik Dal
1991	Khalilur Rahman Chowdhury	Jatiya Party
Feb 1996	Sheikh Sujat Mia	Bangladesh Nationalist Party
Jun 1996	Dewan Farid Gazi	Awami League
2011 by-election	Sheikh Sujat Mia	Bangladesh Nationalist Party
2014	Abdul Munim Chowdhury	Jatiya Party (Ershad)
2018	Gazi Mohammad Shahnawaz	Awami League
2024	Amatul Kibria Keya Chowdhury	Independent
2026	Reza Kibria	Bangladesh Nationalist Party

== Elections ==
=== Elections in the 2010s ===
Abdul Munim Chowdhury was elected unopposed in the 2014 general election after opposition parties withdrew their candidacies in a boycott of the election.

Dewan Farid Gazi died in November 2010. Sheikh Sujat Mia of the BNP was elected in a January 2011 by-election, defeating Awami League candidate Mushfiq Hussain Chowdhury and Jatiya Party (Ershad) candidate Abdul Munim Chowdhury.

=== Elections in the 2000s ===
General Election 2008: Habiganj-1
Party	Candidate	Votes	%	±%
AL	Dewan Farid Gazi	152,080	64.0	+23.9
BNP	Sheikh Sujat Mia	79,488	33.5	−2.0
BKM	Nezam Uddin	4,106	1.7	N/A
BSD	Md. Junayed Miah	1,157	0.5	N/A
Gano Forum	Dewan Sayed Mohammad Abdul Ahad Chowdhury	719	0.3	N/A
Majority		72,592	30.6	+26.0
Turnout		237,550	83.3	+12.5
AL hold				

General Election 2001: Habiganj-1
Party	Candidate	Votes	%	±%
AL	Dewan Farid Gazi	74,693	40.1	+1.8
BNP	Sheikh Sujat Mia	66,137	35.5	+15.8
IJOF	Khalilur Rahman Chowdhury	43,453	23.3	N/A
Independent	Md. Yakub Ali	872	0.5	N/A
JSD	Md. Sahid Mia	621	0.3	N/A
Bangladesh Samajtantrik Dal (Basad-Khalekuzzaman)	Junaed Ahmed	470	0.3	N/A
Majority		8,556	4.6	−1.8
Turnout		186,246	70.8	+2.8
AL hold				

=== Elections in the 1990s ===
General Election June 1996: Habiganj-1
Party	Candidate	Votes	%	±%
AL	Dewan Farid Gazi	52,940	38.3	−0.8
JP(E)	Khalilur Rahman Chowdhury	44,113	31.9	−7.2
BNP	Sheik Sujat Mia	27,248	19.7	+7.2
IOJ	Nizam Uddin	7,670	5.5	N/A
Jamaat	Md. Golam Rahman Chowdhury	3,393	2.5	N/A
BIF	Qari Lutfar Rahman Helal	862	0.6	N/A
Jatiya Samajtantrik Dal-JSD	Md. Sahid Mia	676	0.5	−1.8
Bangladesh Samajtantrik Dal (Khalekuzzaman)	Faisal Soheb	666	0.5	−0.1
Independent	Md. A. Samit	514	0.4	N/A
Gano Forum	Md. Abdul Hannan	188	0.1	N/A
Majority		8,827	6.4	+3.6
Turnout		138,270	68.0	+22.6
AL gain from BNP				

General Election 1991: Habiganj-1
Party	Candidate	Votes	%	±%
JP(E)	Khalilur Rahman Chowdhury	41,957	39.1	
AL	Farid Gazi	38,927	36.3	
BNP	Faruk Bakht Chowdhury	13,416	12.5	
Independent	Md. Abdul Aziz Chowdhury	8,975	8.4	
Jatiya Samajtantrik Dal-JSD	Md. Abdul Mosabbir	2,520	2.3	
Bangladesh Samajtantrik Dal (Khalekuzzaman)	Faisal Soheb	649	0.6	
Independent	Khalilur Rahman	430	0.4	
NIP	Rakib Uddin Chowdhury	288	0.3	
Independent	Md. Abdul Khaleq	154	0.1	
Majority		3,030	2.8	
Turnout		107,316	45.4	
JP(E) gain from				
