= Md. Abu Zahir =

Bangladeshi politician

- মোঃ আবু জ়াহির

Member of the Bangladesh Parliament for Habiganj-3
- In office 25 January 2009 – 6 August 2024
- Preceded by: Abu Lais Md. Mubin Chowdhury
- Succeeded by: G K Gouse

Personal details
- Born: 3 March 1963 (age 63)
- Party: Bangladesh Awami League

Md. Abu Zahir (Bengali: মোঃ আবু জ়াহির; born 3 March 1963) is a Bangladesh Awami League politician and a former Jatiya Sangsad member representing the Habiganj-3 constituency.

== Early life ==
Abu Zahir was born on 3 March 1963. He went to law school and practiced law after graduation.

== Career ==
Zahir was elected to Parliament on 5 January 2014 from Habiganj-3 as a Bangladesh Awami League candidate. He is also the President of Habiganj District Awami League, elected in 2019.
