= Mahbubur Rob Sadi =

Bangladeshi politician and freedom fighter

- মাহবুবুর রব সাদী
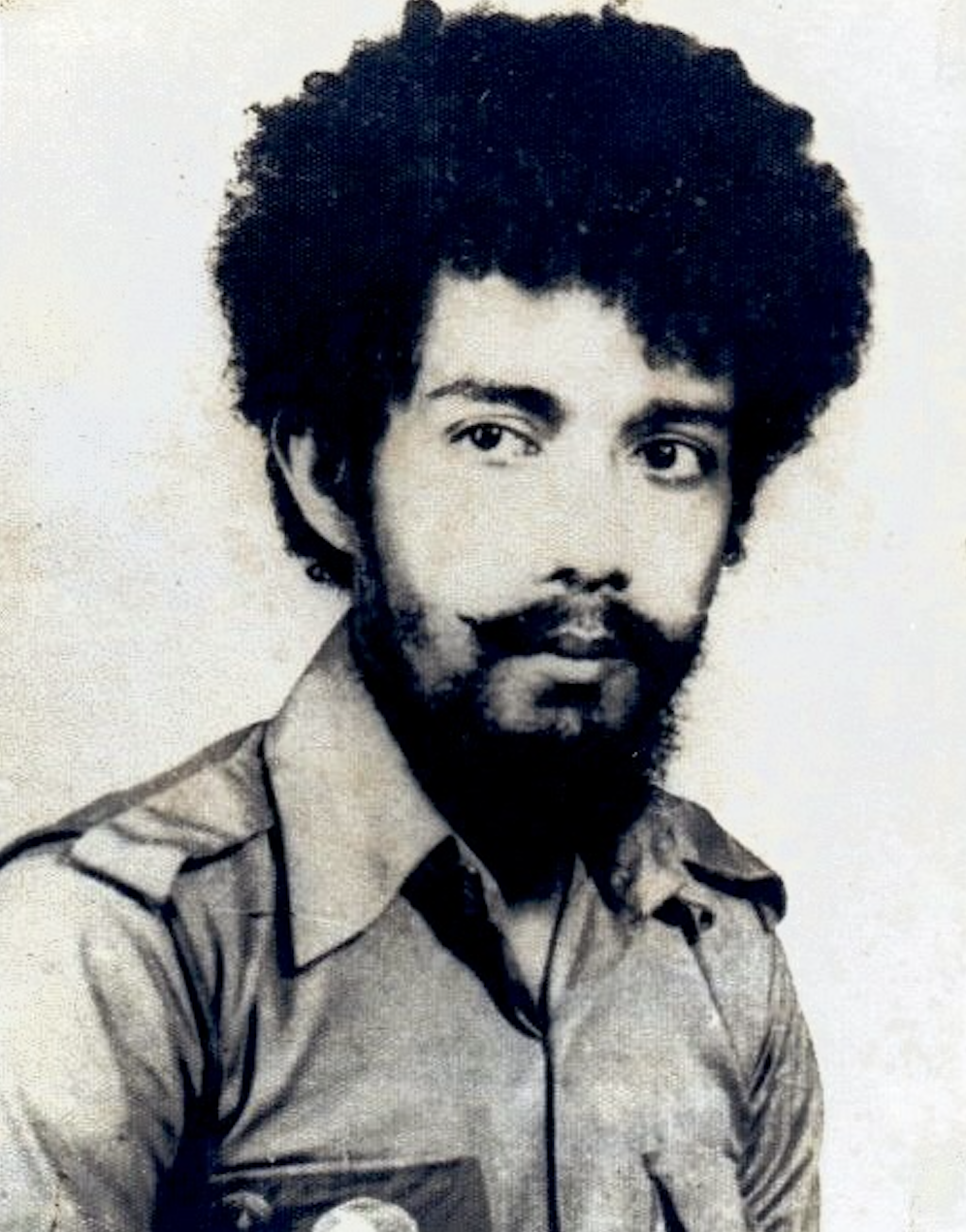
- Portrait following the Bangladesh Liberation War

Member of Parliament
- In office 18 February 1979 – 12 February 1982
- Preceded by: Abdul Mannan Chowdhury
- Succeeded by: Ismat Ahmed Chowdhury
- Constituency: Habiganj-1

Personal details
- Born: 10 May 1942 Nabiganj, Habiganj, Assam, British India (present day Habiganj, Sylhet, Bangladesh)
- Died: 17 October 2016 (aged 74) Dhaka, Bangladesh
- Citizenship: Bangladesh
- Party: JASAD
- Other political affiliations: Awami League (1963 – 1972)
- Awards: Bir Protik

Military service
- Allegiance: Bangladesh
- Branch/service: Mukti Bahini
- Unit: Sector – IV
- Commands: Sub-Commander of Sector – IV
- Battles/wars: Bangladesh Liberation War

Dewan Mahbubur Rob Sadi Chaudhuri (Bengali: দেওয়ান মাহবুবুর রব সাদী চৌধুরী; 10 May 1942 – 17 October 2016) was a Bengali politician. He was a 1971 Liberation War veteran and war hero who led the Jalalpur sub-sector (sector 4) as sub-sector commander of the Mukti Bahini under Sector Commander Major General Chitta Ranjan Dutta. Sadi was awarded Bir Protik on 15 December 1973 for demonstration of personal acts of valor during the war. He was elected a member of parliament in 1979. Besides being a freedom fighter and politician, Sadi was also a singer, poet, columnist, and songwriter. He was an active columnist for the Manab Zamin, and his articles and letters appeared in various national and international newspapers and magazines like The Economist, The Daily Star, The Daily Ittefaq, and Prothom Alo. Sadi served as the executive director of Delta Life Insurance Company Ltd, and later founded a socio-political organization named Centre for Democratic Practice, dedicated towards fostering democracy and national consciousness and consensus in Bangladesh.

== Early years ==
The youngest son of Dewan Mohammad Mamun Chowdhury and Syeda Zebunnessa Khatun, Sadi was born in Nabiganj, Habiganj, Assam Province, British India (present day Habiganj, Sylhet, Bangladesh) on 10 May 1942. As a child he was never too fond of schools or textbooks, as he was more of an adventurous type. He spent a great deal of time wandering around the village with his cohorts, minding other people's business. Sadi was better known as the good Samaritan who stood beside the sick and the poor. His father was always worried about news of his son selling off trees or land to help someone out.

Sadi graduated from J.K. & H.K. High School, Habiganj, in 1961. During his college years, he was elected cultural secretary of the Students Association, Chittagong City College. In the following year, he enrolled in Moulovibazar Government College and was elected general secretary of the Student Association. Sadi joined the Bangladesh Chhatra League.

== The Liberation War, 1971 ==
When the struggle for independence began, Sadi was on his way to Khawai subdivision in Tripura, India, for training under the BSF. He was then off to train under the Indian Army in Meghalaya, India. Struck by his fearlessness and valor, the commander in charge of the training camp, Brigadier Watke, offered Sadi a position in the armed forces. But nothing was more important to Sadi than to fight for the freedom of his motherland, and so he declined. When the brigadier asked, "I will give you one rifle to kill an enemy, but don't you want anything for yourself?" Sadi replied, "Give me more rifles and I will kill more enemies!" In response to this, the brigadier appointed Sadi as a sub-sector commander (sector 4) in Sylhet. He was among the very few commanders, in the entire Liberation Army, to be appointed from outside the armed forces.

Post-War

Immediately after liberation, Sadi was made honorary commander of the Shanti Rakkhi Bahini in Sylhet by the fragile government of the newborn country for restoration of law and order and maintaining peace. Under his leadership, Sylhet was recognized among the first post-war districts where looting and plundering were soon under control.

Symbol of valor and courage

On 15 December 1973, Sadi was awarded the Bir Protik gallantry award. He was probably the only veteran to publicly refuse to accept the medal in protest of partiality in the program. It was his firm belief that many nonmilitary (civilian) martyrs also deserved the Bir Shrestho gallantry award, the highest gallantry award of Bangladesh. Saluting the unparalleled contribution of the compatriot martyrs who went unnoticed, Sadi never collected his own medal. This war hero yet again inspired his nation with a display of true patriotism.

== Political career ==
Sadi had been a very active member of the Students Union of Bangladesh Awami League during Sheikh Mujibur Rahman's call for independence from Pakistan. His active interest in politics made him appreciate the Awami League's efforts for the rights of Bengalis in Bangladesh under oppressive Pakistani rule, and during his time in school, he established the Dinarpur Krishak Pragati Shangha to fight for the rights of the farming community of Bangladesh.

Sadi joined the Bangladesh Chhatra League in 1962, and eventually the Bangladesh Awami League (1963–1972). As a student, he played an active role in expanding Chhatra League in the Sylhet region. After liberation, he was one of the leading members of Chhatra League who decided to part ways and form JaSad.

In 1972, Mahbubur Rob Sadi, as a left-wing commander, took part in the formation of Jatiyo Samajtantrik Dal together with socialist political activists, military officers, and pro-Awami League top-ranking student leaders. He was a Central Committee member and was elected a member of parliament in 1979. Conflicting ideologies forced Sadi to eventually part ways with the party. Sadi had earned the reputation of a man of high principles and unquestioned honesty. Many were the times that he was called by the running governments to take up prestigious portfolios, but he was not the one to take advantage of his reputation and recognition.

In later years Sadi founded a socio-political organization named the Centre for Democratic Practice, dedicated towards fostering democracy and national consciousness and consensus in Bangladesh.

== Family background ==
Sadi was the youngest grandson of Khan Bahadur Dewan Mohammad Wasil Chaudhuri, whose title of respect and honor was bestowed by the British Indian Empire during the British Rule, primarily in recognition of public services rendered.

His father, Dewan Mohammad Mamun Chowdhury, was a zamindar in Sylhet. A strong supporter of a liberated Bangladesh, he never tried to stop his son from risking his life to save the motherland. During the war, Sadi's father was interrogated by the Pakistani military as they learned of his freedom fighter son, but he was eventually released after three days of torture.

Sadi's elder brother, Shegufta Bakht Chaudhuri, was the chief controller of import-export, East and West Pakistan prior to the country's liberation. After liberation, Chaudhuri served as governor of the Bangladesh Bank (1987–1992), and as an adviser in the caretaker government of Bangladesh (2001).

Sadi's uncle (maternal) Syed Mujtaba Ali, a renowned Bengali scholar, author, academic, and linguist, was one of his biggest inspirations. Barely three and a half months after the Partition of India, Syed Mujtaba Ali was one of the first to call for Bangla as East Pakistan's state language on 30 November 1947, at the Sylhet Muslim Sahitya Sangsad.

Sadi and Tajkera Sadi were married for thirty-three years until her death on 24 December 2012. Mrs. Sadi was the niece of Mizanur Rahman Chowdhury, former Prime Minister of Bangladesh (1986–1988).

== Death ==
Sadi died on 17 October 2016 in United Hospital, Dhaka, Bangladesh.
