= Abu Lais Md. Mubin Chowdhury =

Bangladeshi diplomat and politician

Member of Parliament

Personal details
- Born: 1942 Habiganj
- Died: 27 December 2013 (aged 71–72)
- Party: Bangladesh Nationalist Party

Abu Lais Md. Mubin Chowdhury was a Bangladesh Nationalist Party politician and four-term member of parliament from Habiganj-3.

== Career ==
Chowdhury was elected to parliament in 1988, 1991, and 1996 from Habiganj-3 as a candidate of the Jatiya Party. In 2000, he was a member of the Parliamentary Standing Committee on the Ministry of Planning. He lost the 2001 election to Awami League candidate Shah A M S Kibria. He is a former chairman of Habiganj Zila Parishad. He was nominated to contest a by-election in Habiganj-3 on 25 April 2005. The by-elections were called following the assassination of member of parliament of Habiganj-3 and Bangladesh Awami League politician, Shah A M S Kibria. He won the by-election. He lost the 2008 election to Md. Abu Zahir.

== Death ==
Chowdhury died of a heart attack at Shaistanagar town in Habiganj city on 27 December 2013, and was buried on the same day at Shastanagar graveyard.
