= Gazi Mohammad Shahnawaz =

Bangladeshi politician

Member of Parliament for Habiganj-1
- In office 2018 – 5 August 2024
- Preceded by: Abdul Munim Chowdhury

Personal details
- Born: 17 July 1958 (age 66); Devapara, Nabiganj, Habiganj
- Political party: Bangladesh Awami League
- Parent: Dewan Farid Gazi (father)

Gazi Mohammad Shahnawaz, also known as Milad Gazi, is a Bangladesh Awami League politician and the incumbent member of parliament of Habiganj-1.

== Early life ==
Shahnawaz was born on 17 July 1958. He has a BCom degree.

== Career ==
Shahnawaz was elected to parliament from Habiganj-1 as a Bangladesh Awami League candidate on 30 December 2018.
