= Shawkat Ara Begum =

Bangladeshi politician

Member of Bangladesh Parliament
- In office 2009–2014

Personal details
- Party: Bangladesh Awami League

Shawkat Ara Begum is a Bangladesh Awami League politician and a former member of the Bangladesh Parliament from a reserved seat.

== Early life ==
Begum was born on 31 January 1964. She has a law degree.

== Career ==
Begum was elected to parliament from a reserved seat in Nawabganj as a Bangladesh Awami League candidate in 2009.
