= Zakaria Khan Chowdhury =

Bangladeshi politician (1933–2021)

Member of Bangladesh Parliament
- In office 19 March 1996 – 30 March 1996
- Preceded by: Sharif Uddin Ahmed
- Succeeded by: Sharif Uddin Ahmed

Personal details
- Born: 18 November 1933 Assam, British India
- Died: 25 March 2021 (age 87) Green Life Medical College Hospital, Dhaka, Bangladesh
- Party: Bangladesh Nationalist Party
- Spouse: Shamim Sikder

Zakaria Khan Chowdhury (Bengali: জাকারিয়া খান চৌধুরী) was a Bangladesh Nationalist Party politician and a member of parliament from Habiganj-2.

== Early life ==
Chowdhury was born 18 November 1933 in Assam, British India. He graduated with a B.A. in economics from the University of Dhaka in 1955.

== Career ==
In 1960, Chowdhury created Purboshuri, a secret organisation, in London that would work for the independence of Bangladesh. He protested outside the Pakistan Embassy in London over the filing of the Agartala Conspiracy Case. He sent Sir William Thomas Williams, QC, to defend Sheikh Mujibur Rahman, with whom he had close contact, in the Agartala case. He returned to Bangladesh from London in 1972. In 1977, he became an advisor to the government of President Ziaur Rahman. He was instrumental in the formation of the Bangladesh Haor and Wetland Development Board.

Chowdhury worked as an organiser during the Bangladesh Liberation War. He was the publisher of The Manobkantha.

Chowdhury was elected to parliament from Habiganj-2 as a Bangladesh Nationalist Party candidate on 15 February 1996.

== Death ==
Chowdhury died on 25 March 2021 at Green Life Medical College Hospital, Dhaka, Bangladesh.
