= Dewan Farid Gazi =

Bangladeshi politician (1924–2010)

Member of Bangladesh Parliament

Personal details
- Born: 1 March 1924 Devapara, Nabiganj, Habiganj District, Assam, British Raj.
- Died: 19 November 2010 (aged 86) Dhaka, Bangladesh
- Resting place: Shah Jalal Dargah Cemetery
- Party: Awami League
- Children: Gazi Mohammad Shahnawaz
- Parent: Dewan Muhammad Hamid Gazi (father)

Dewan Farid Gazi (Bengali: দেওয়ান ফরিদ গাজী; 1 March 1924 – 19 November 2010) was a Bangladeshi politician born in Devpara, Nabiganj Upazila, Sylhet. He was elected as member of parliament for the Habiganj-1 (Nabigonj-Bahubal) constituency in 1996, 2001 and 2008, representing the Awami League, of which he was an advisory council member. He served as chairman of the Parliamentary Standing Committee on the Ministry of Primary and Mass Education.

== Early life ==
Gazi was born on 1 March 1924 in Devapara, Nabiganj, Habiganj District, Assam, British Raj. He was born into a Bengali Muslim family. His father, Dewan Muhammad Hamid Gazi was a zamindar in Dinarpur Pargana and was descended from Dewan Tajuddin Al-Quraishi Al-Ghazi in his 15th generation, a companion of Shah Jalal. He studied in Moulvibazar Junior Madrasa, Sylhet Aliya Madrasa, and graduated from Sylhet Rasamoy Memorial High School in 1945. He graduated in 1947 from Murari Chand College and in 1949 from Madan Mohan College. He joined the Assam Muslim Student Federation as a student. He campaigned against the Bangal Khedao (Oust Bengalees) movement of the Assamese people, which sought to remove Bengali people from Assam. He helped organise the Sylhet referendum in 1947. He carried out campaigns in 1950 to stop religious violence in Sylhet.

== Career ==
Gazi joined the Rasamoy Memorial High School as a teacher and then worked in Sylhet Government High School. He joined the Awami League in 1952 and was elected joint secretary of the Sylhet district Awami League. From 1952 to 1955, he worked in the Bengali Jugabhery weekly and the English Eastern Herald weekly. He was elected Topkhana union parisad chairman and Sylhet municipality commissioner. He was involved in the six-point program of the Awami League and was jailed for it in 1967. He campaigned against military dictator General Ayub Khan in 1969. In 1970, he was elected to the National Assembly of Pakistan from Sylhet as an Awami League candidate.

Gazi was involved in the Awami League-led Non-Cooperation movement in 1971 in Sylhet. In the Bangladesh Liberation War, he was an advisor of sectors 3 and 4 of the Mukti Bahini on civil affairs. He was elected to Bangladesh Parliament in 1973 from Sylhet. He served in the cabinet of Sheikh Mujibur Rahman as State Minister of the Ministry of Local Government and Cooperative, and afterwards he served as the state minister of commerce. He helped introduce the wage earners scheme policy. After the assassination of Sheikh Mujibur Rahman, he joined the cabinet of Khondakar Mostaq Ahmad in 1975. And he was the first person who resigned from Khondaker's cabinet as a sign of protest against him. He campaigned for the removal of military dictator Hussain Mohammad Ershad in 1990. He was elected to parliament from Habiganj-1 in 1996, 2001, and 2008.

== Death ==
Gazi died on 19 November 2010 in Dhaka, Bangladesh. He was buried in Shah Jalal Dargah Cemetery in Sylhet.
