= Habiganj-2 =

Constituency of Bangladesh's Jatiya Sangsad

Coordinates: 24.52°N 91.37°E

- Constituency for the Jatiya Sangsad
- District: Habiganj District
- Division: Sylhet Division
- Electorate: 306,981 (2018)

Current constituency
- Created: 1984
- Party: Bangladesh Nationalist Party
- Member: Abu Mansur Sakhawat Hasan
- ← 239 Habiganj-1 241 Habiganj-3 →

Habiganj-2 is a constituency represented in the Jatiya Sangsad (National Parliament) of Bangladesh since 2026 by Abu Mansur Sakhawat Hasan of the Bangladesh Nationalist Party.

== Boundaries ==
The constituency encompasses Ajmiriganj and Baniachong upazilas.

== History ==
The constituency was created in 1984 from a Sylhet constituency when the former Sylhet District was split into four districts: Sunamganj, Sylhet, Moulvibazar, and Habiganj.

== Members of Parliament ==
Election	Member	Party
1986	Sirajul Hossain Khan	Jatiya Party (Ershad)
1988	Sirajul Hossain Khan	Jatiya Party (Ershad)
1991	Sharif Uddin Ahmed	Awami League
Feb 1996	Zakaria Khan Chowdhury	Bangladesh Nationalist Party
Jun 1996	Sharif Uddin Ahmed	Awami League
Oct 1996 by-election	Suranjit Sengupta	Awami League
2001	Nazmul Hasan Jahed	Awami League
2008	Md. Abdul Majid Khan	Awami League
2014	Md. Abdul Majid Khan	Awami League
2018	Md. Abdul Majid Khan	Awami League
2024	Moyez Uddin Sharif Ruel	Awami League
2026	Abu Mansur Sakhawat Hasan	Bangladesh Nationalist Party

== Elections ==
=== Elections in the 2010s ===
General Election 2018: Habiganj-2
Party	Candidate	Votes	%	±%
AL	Abdul Majid Khan	1,79,480	74.41	+1.81
BNP	Maulana Abdul Basit Azad	59,724	24.76	N/A
JP(E)	Shankar Pal	1987	0.82	−23.08
Majority		1,19,756	49.65	+0.95
Turnout		2,41,191	78.57	N/A
AL hold				

General Election 2014: Habiganj-2
Party	Candidate	Votes	%	±%
AL	Abdul Majid Khan	65,362	72.6	+12.6
JP(E)	Shankar Pal	21,556	23.9	+21.6
Independent	Afsar Ahmed	3,112	3.5	+1.2
Majority		43,803	48.7	+21.7
Turnout		90,033		
AL hold				

=== Elections in the 2000s ===
General Election 2008: Habiganj-2
Party	Candidate	Votes	%	±%
AL	Abdul Majid Khan	122,025	60.0	+28.8
BNP	Abu Mansur Sakhawat Hasan	67,059	33.0	+2.0
Independent	Afsar Ahmed	4,722	2.3	N/A
JP(E)	Abid Ali Chowdhury	4,665	2.3	N/A
Bangladesh Khelafat Majlish	Abdur Rob Yousufi	3,167	1.6	N/A
Jamiat Ulema-e-Islam Bangladesh	Abdul Awal Chowdhury Waisy	837	0.4	N/A
BSD	Md. Kamrul Islam Chowdhury	563	0.3	N/A
KSJL	Monmuhan Debnath	337	0.2	N/A
Majority		54,966	27.0	+26.8
Turnout		203,375	85.0	+13.2
AL hold				

General Election 2001: Habiganj-2
Party	Candidate	Votes	%	±%
AL	Nazmul Hasan Jahed	50,361	31.2	−33.4
BNP	Md. Nurul Amin Chowdhury	50,014	31.0	N/A
IJOF	Shankar Pal	31,431	19.5	N/A
Independent	Zakaria Chowdhury	28,320	17.5	N/A
Independent	Sakhawat Hasan Jibon	453	0.3	N/A
Independent	Krisna Kanta Sarkar	432	0.3	N/A
Bangladesh Samajtantrik Dal (Basad-Khalekuzzaman)	Syed Delwar Hossain	273	0.2	N/A
Jatiya Party (M)	Akul Chowdhury	197	0.1	N/A
Majority		347	0.2	−29.8
Turnout		161,481	71.8	+7.8
AL hold				

=== Elections in the 1990s ===
Sharif Uddin Ahmed died in office. Suranjit Sengupta was elected in an October 1996 by-election.

Habiganj-2 by-election, 1996
Party	Candidate	Votes	%	±%
AL	Suranjit Sengupta	72,925	64.6	+24.6
JP(E)	Sirajul Hossain Khan	39,032	34.6	+9.4
Bangladesh Samajtantrik Dal (Mahbub)	Tofazzal Hossain Chowdhury	776	0.7	N/A
BKSMA	Krishak Md. Sadeq	237	0.2	N/A
Majority		33,893	30.0	+16.9
Turnout		112,970	64.0	−8.9
AL hold				

General Election June 1996: Habiganj-2
Party	Candidate	Votes	%	±%
AL	Sharif Uddin Ahmed	51,369	40.0	−7.4
BNP	Zakaria Khan Chowdhury	34,530	26.9	−10.7
JP(E)	Sirajul Hossain Khan	32,361	25.2	N/A
Jamaat	Ashraf Uddin	4,919	3.8	−5.4
IOJ	Md. Tazul Islam	3,289	2.6	N/A
Bangladesh Samajtantrik Dal (Mahbub)	Md. Tafazzal Hossain Chowdhury	2,087	1.6	N/A
Majority		16,839	13.1	+3.4
Turnout		128,555	72.9	+18.1
AL hold				

General Election 1991: Habiganj-2
Party	Candidate	Votes	%	±%
AL	Sharif Uddin Ahmed	50,397	47.4	
BNP	Zakaria Khan Chowdhury	40,025	37.6	
Jamaat	Fazlul Karim	9,769	9.2	
BKA	Sheik Abdur Rahman	5,587	5.3	
JSD	Md. Abdullah	624	0.6	
Majority		10,372	9.7	
Turnout		106,402	54.8	
AL gain from				
