= Tajuddin Quraishi =

14th-century religious and political figure

Tajuddin Quraishi (Bengali: তাজউদ্দীন কুরাইশী) was a 14th-century religious and political figure associated with the conquest of Sylhet, in what is present-day Bangladesh.

== Life ==
Born in what is now Yemen, Quraishi was the son of a prominent Sufi, Kiamuddin, and 10th in descent from the caliph Abu Bakr. Quraishi became a companion of the Sufi warrior-saint Shah Jalal in the latter's campaign in Sylhet, battling against the ruler of Taraf, Achak Narayana, in 1303.

Following the conquest of Sylhet, Quraishi was appointed qazi and later dewan, ultimately being entrusted with the administration of Dinarpur in the region of Laur, in present-day Habiganj district. He preached Islam throughout this area, establishing a khanaqah, building mosques and excavating reservoirs. Subsequently, he became known as an alim and Sufi of the Suhrawardi order, as well as being attributed with supernatural powers.

Quraishi died in Chouki, where his mazar now stands.
