= Md. Abdul Majid Khan =

Bangladeshi politician

Member of Parliament

Personal details
- Born: 31 December 1954 (age 71)
- Party: Awami League

Md. Abdul Majid Khan (Bengali: মোঃ আব্দুল মজিদ খান) is an Awami League politician and former Member of Parliament from Habiganj-2.

== Early life ==
Khan was born on 31 December 1954. He completed his undergraduate in communications and also has a law degree.

== Career ==
In 2008, Khan was elected to parliament from Habiganj-2 as a candidate of the Awami League. He received 152,080 votes while his nearest rival, Sheikh Sujat Miah of the Bangladesh Nationalist Party, received 79,488 votes.

Khan was elected to Parliament on 5 January 2014 from Habiganj-2 as an Awami League candidate. He received 65,362 Votes while his nearest rival, independent candidate Afsar Ahmed, received 3,112 votes.

Khan was re-elected to parliament in 2018 as a candidate of the Awami League from Habiganj-2. He had 179,480 votes while his nearest rival, Maulana Abdul Basit Azad of the Khelafat Majlis, received 59,724 votes. He was a member of the parliamentary standing committee on Ministry of Foreign Affairs. He visited Cambodia in 2020 as part of a delegation of the parliamentary standing committee to discuss the Rohingya refugees in Bangladesh.

Khan did not receive the nomination for the 2024 election.

== Controversy ==
He was arrested in February 2025, following the fall of the Sheikh Hasina led Awami League government. He was accused of being involved in the murder of Ripon Shil who died in protests against Sheikh Hasina.
