= Mass media in Bangladesh =

The mass media in Bangladesh refers to the print, broadcast and online mass media available in Bangladesh. The Constitution guarantees press freedom and freedom of expression within "reasonable restriction", though some media outlets, such as the daily Amar Desh newspaper and Diganta Television, have been harassed. The Bangladeshi media's rank dropped to 146 in 2018 from 144 in 2016 out of 180 countries on the Reporters Without Borders Press Freedom Index, with 1st being the most free. After the July Revolution in 2024, many formerly banned media outlets had their suspensions lifted.

== Overview ==
The media in Bangladesh is a mix of government-owned and private media. There are still criminal penalties for libel, defamation and sedition as well as reporting on national security issues. Reporters can be held for up to 120 days without trial under the 1974 Special Powers Act. Media restrictions have usually increased during periods of political turmoil. Reporters Without Borders has accused the army of targeting journalists and enforcing censorship.

== News agencies ==
News agencies were present in Bangladesh prior to its independence from Pakistan in 1971. The state-owned Associated Press of Pakistan (AAP) had branches in Dhaka and Chittagong from 1949. After independence, the AAP was replaced by the Bangladesh state-owned agency Bangladesh Sangbad Sangstha. The second news agency to be established, and the first to be privately owned, was Eastern News Agency (ENA). It was founded in Dhaka in the years immediately prior to the Bangladesh Liberation War by a consortium of six shareholders, which included its founding editor Golam Rasul Mallick. United News of Bangladesh, founded in 1988, was the country's first fully computerised privately owned agency. Other private news agencies include News Network of Bangladesh (NNB) and BD News 24, which also launched the country's first photo agency, Focus Bangla.

== Newspapers ==
The print media is private and consists of hundreds of weekly publications, presenting a wide range of viewpoints, though some outspoken papers have faced pressure in the past. English language papers such as the Daily Star appeal to an educated urban readership.

== Television and radio ==
Television is the biggest medium for news in Bangladesh. There were 15 television stations in 1999. In 2006, there were 15 AM and 13 FM radio stations available. The BBC World Service broadcasts in the country, and Indian and other foreign television broadcasts are received in the country. There are more than 100 television channels in Bangladesh.

Bangladesh NGOs Network for Radio and Communication (BNNRC), which holds special consultative status with the UN ECOSOC, considers community radio a special area for intervention. Since its establishment in 2000, BNNRC has carried out advocacy with the government on community radio, together with other organizations.

According to BNNRC, the objective of its community radio intervention is to address social issues at the community level, such as poverty and social exclusion, to empower marginalized rural groups and to support democratic processes and ongoing development efforts.

Community radio is intended to give a voice to people who do not have access to the mainstream media, allowing them to express their ideas and views on community development. Its stated aims include promoting the right to communicate, informing the community and supporting the free flow of information.

The Ministry of Information of the People's Republic of Bangladesh announced the Community Radio Installation, Broadcast and Operation Policy 2008. Under this policy, the Ministry of Information in 2011 approved the installation, broadcast, and operation of the first 12 community radio stations in Bangladesh. By 2016, the number of active community radio stations rose to 14. The government enacted the Right to Information Act 2009 to ensure the free flow of information and people's right to information.

The government initially approved 14 initiators: Young Power in Action(YPSA) for Sitakunda, Chittagong; Nalta Community Hospital for Satkhira; LDRO for Bogra; BRAC for Moulivi Bazer; Barandro Community Radio for Naogaon; Proyas for Chapai Nababgonj; CCD for Rajshahi; Srizoni for Jhinaidhah; EC Bangladesh for Munsihigonj; MMC for Barguna; RDRS for Kurigram; Sundarban Community Radio for Koyra(Khulna); ACLAB for Telnaf (Cox's Bazer); and Agriculture Information Services (AIS) for Community Rural Radio, Amtoli (Barguna)

.

BNNRC provided technical assistance to around 200 organizations in the community radio application process through a National Help Desk on Community Radio at the BNNRC Secretariat in Dhaka. Following this experience, BNNRC established the Community Radio Academy (CRA) to provide human resource development, research and development, and technical cooperation for community radio in Bangladesh. The academy organizes community radio related training, research, technical assistance and other support for community radio initiators throughout the year.

Community radio is considered an alternative mass medium for the rural disadvantaged population to express their thoughts in their own voice and style. Community radio stations are usually non-profit organizations.

== Internet media ==
There are an estimated 11.4 million internet users in Bangladesh, and use is unrestricted by the government; however, some journalists' emails have been monitored. People also use online newspapers and news portals, of which there are a large number in Bangladesh. However, not all news portals are listed by the government, which has sought to create a memorandum for online news portals. Social media platforms such as Facebook and Twitter have also become influential media in Bangladesh.
