= Sheikh Sujat Mia =

Bangladeshi politician

Member of Parliament

Personal details
- Political party: Bangladesh Nationalist Party

Sheikh Sujat Mia is a Bangladesh Nationalist Party politician and the former Member of Parliament from Habiganj-1. He was the member of parliament from 2011 to 2014 and sixth Jatiya Sangsad elections held on 15 February 1996

== Career ==
Mia was elected to parliament in 2011 in a by-election from Habiganj-1 as a Bangladesh Nationalist Party candidate. The by-elections were called following the death of incumbent Member of Parliament Dewan Farid Gazi.
