= Bahubal Upazila =

Bahubal বাহুবল
- Upazila
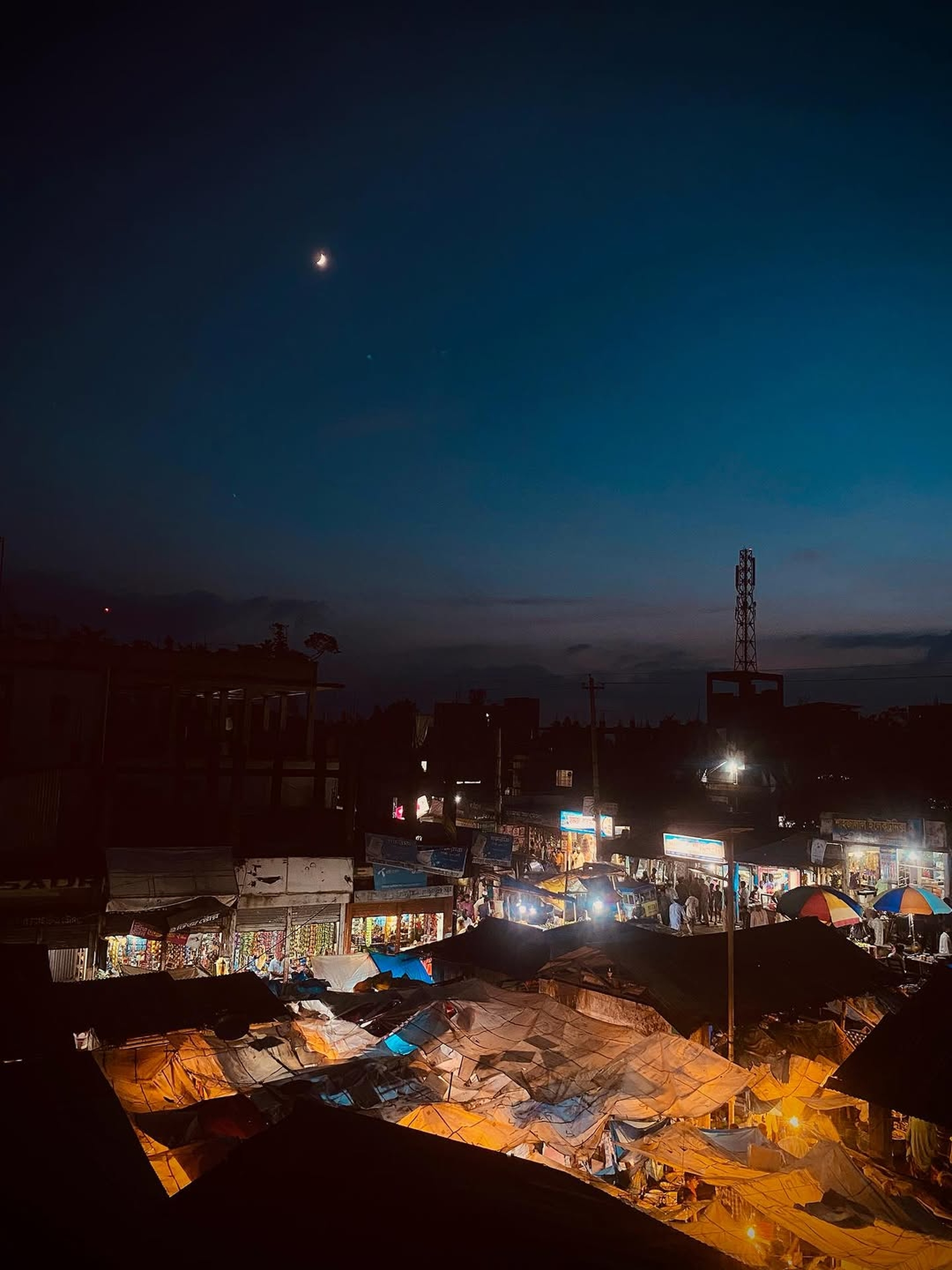
- Bahubal bazaar

- Coordinates: 24°21.3′N 91°32.5′E
- Country: Bangladesh
- Division: Sylhet
- District: Habiganj

Area
  - Total: 250.65 km^{2} (96.78 sq mi)

Population (2022)
  - Total: 219,377
  - Density: 875.23/km^{2} (2,266.8/sq mi)
- Demonym(s): Bahubali, Bahuboli
- Time zone: UTC+6 (BST)
- Postal code: 3310
- Website: bahubal.habiganj.gov.bd

Bahubal Upazila mauza geocode map

Bahubal (Bengali: বাহুবল), is an upazila of Habiganj District in Sylhet Division, Bangladesh.

== History ==
Bahubal was a part of the Tungachhal and Rajpur kingdoms. The last Raja of Tungachhal, Achak Narayan, was defeated in 1303 during the Conquest of Taraf by Syed Nasiruddin and his 12 lascars.

In the 17th century, after Khwaja Usman's departure from Bokainagar Fort, he reached Putijuri in Bahubal. Here, he built a fort at the foot of the Giripal and stationed his brothers, Malhi and Wali, and son, Mumriz in Putia Hill.

Bahuka Bol

দক্ষিণ ভাগ থেকে আইলো মাল, মির মিরাইয়া চায়
Dokkhin bhag theke ailo Mal, mir miraiya chay
A wrestler came from Dakshinbhag, glaring around at everyone
কুদরত মালের ঘুষি খাইয়া গড়াগড়ি যায়
Qudrot Maler ghushi khaiya goragori jay
He got a punch from Qudrot the Wrestler, and went rolling away

—

The area was historically famous to be the home of fighters and people of physical strength. Famed for sports such as malla-yuddha and lathi khela. One day, a wrestler (Mal) from Dakshinbhag, Moulvibazar, came to this area to fight another wrestler by the name of Qudrat Mal in a game of malla-yuddha. Qudrat defeated the wrestler and made his famous statement, "Bahuka Bol Dekh, Beta". This phrase became famous in the local area and from Bahuka-Bol, the place was eventually shortened to Bahubal. This incident is remembered through a common folk rhyme.

On 20 December 1793, Bahubal became a part of Lashkarpur District. In 1921, Bahubal was made thana headquarter.

During the 1950 East Pakistan riots, the village of Silani was attacked at 9 A.M. on 15 February. The mob raised provocative slogans and set fire to many homes. The inhabitants fled to the nearby jungles to save their lives, while the others were killed.

Bahubal thana was upgraded to an upazila in 1984.

== Geography ==
Bahubal is located at 24.3556°N 91.5417°E. It has a total area of 250.65 km^{2}.

== Demographics ==
Historical population
Year	Pop. (000)	±%
1981	120	—
1991	137	+14.2%
2001	167	+21.9%
2011	198	+18.6%
2022	219	+10.6%
Source: Bangladesh Bureau of Statistics

Religions in Bahubal Upazila (2022)
Religion	Percent
Islam	85.99%
Hinduism	13.67%
Other or not stated	0.34%

According to the 2022 Bangladeshi census, Bahubal Upazila had 44,372 households and a population of 219,377. 11.48% of the population were under 5 years of age. Bahubal had a literacy rate (age 7 and over) of 68.03%: 69.57% for males and 66.56% for females, and a sex ratio of 97.43 males for every 100 females. 11,801 (5.38%) lived in urban areas. Ethnic population is 3858 (1.76%) of which Santal are 1516.

According to the 2011 Census of Bangladesh, Bahubal Upazila had 37,334 households and a population of 197,997. 58,458 (29.52%) were under 10 years of age. Bahubal had a literacy rate (age 7 and over) of 39.77%, compared to the national average of 51.8%, and a sex ratio of 1018 females per 1000 males. 4,045 (2.04%) lived in urban areas. Ethnic population was 8,268 (4.18%), of which Santal were 1,368.

== Administration ==
Bahubal Upazila is divided into seven union parishads: Bahubal, Bhadeshwar, Lamatashi, Mirpur, Putijuri, Satkapan, and Snanghat. The union parishads are subdivided into 146 mauzas and 325 villages.

== Education ==
There are many schools and colleges.

== Gallery ==
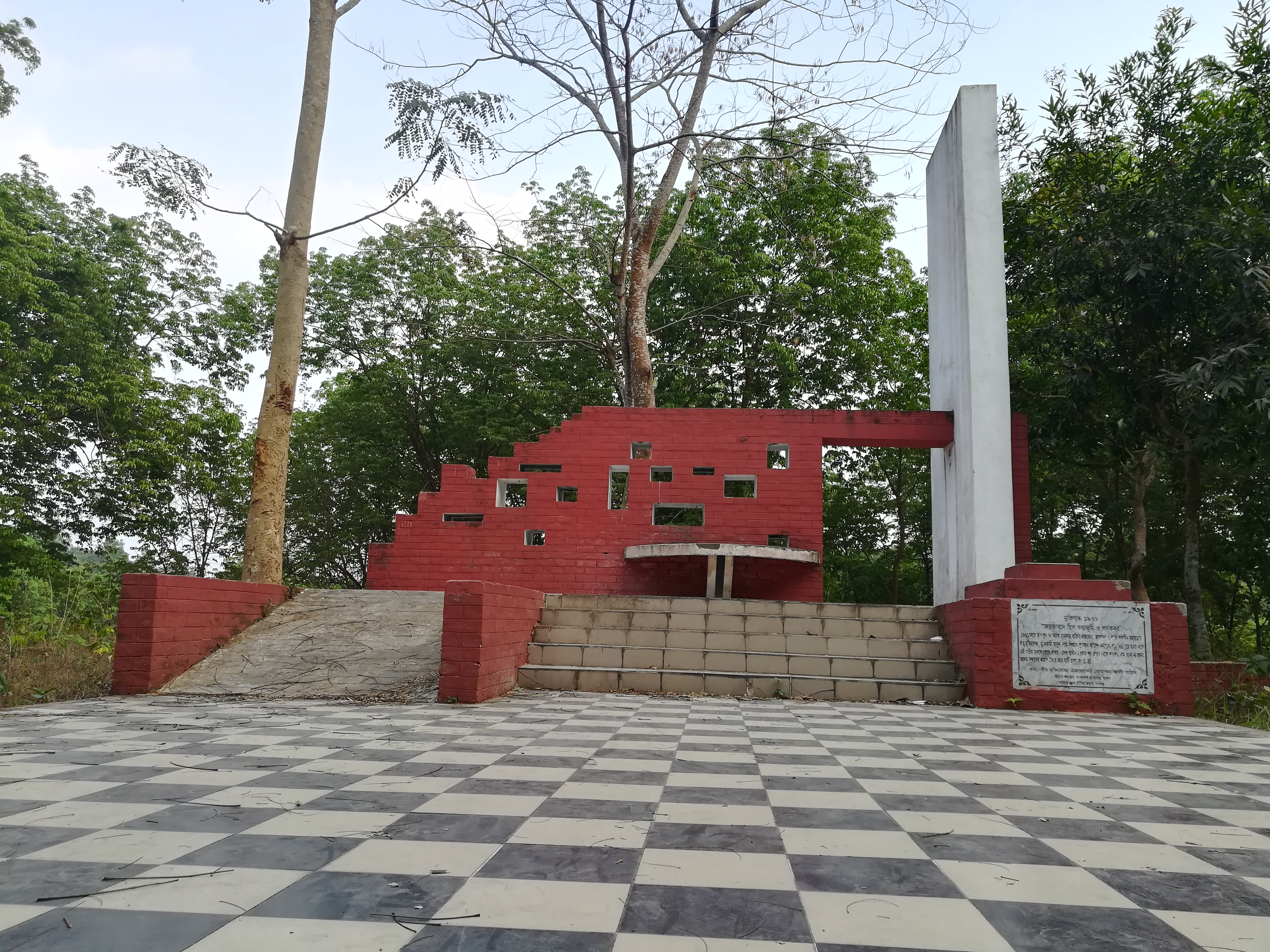
Fayzabad Hill Cemetery and Graveyard

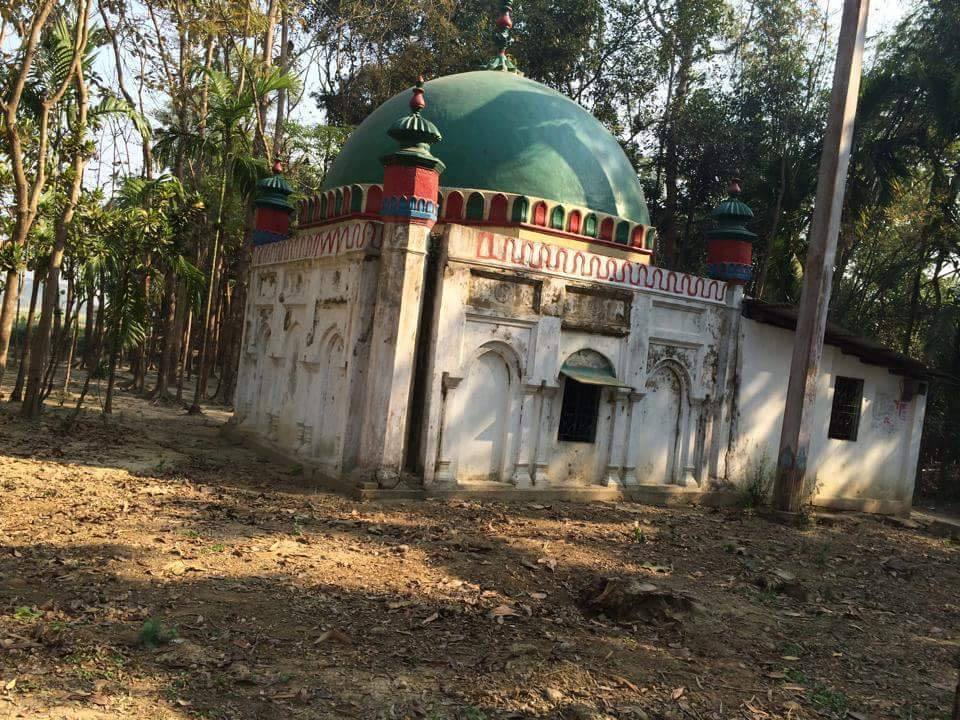
Mirzatula Mosque in the village of Mirjatula, Mirpur Union.

== See also ==
- Upazilas of Bangladesh
- Districts of Bangladesh
- Divisions of Bangladesh
- Administrative geography of Bangladesh
