= Habiganj District =

Habiganj District হবিগঞ্জ জেলা
- District of Bangladesh
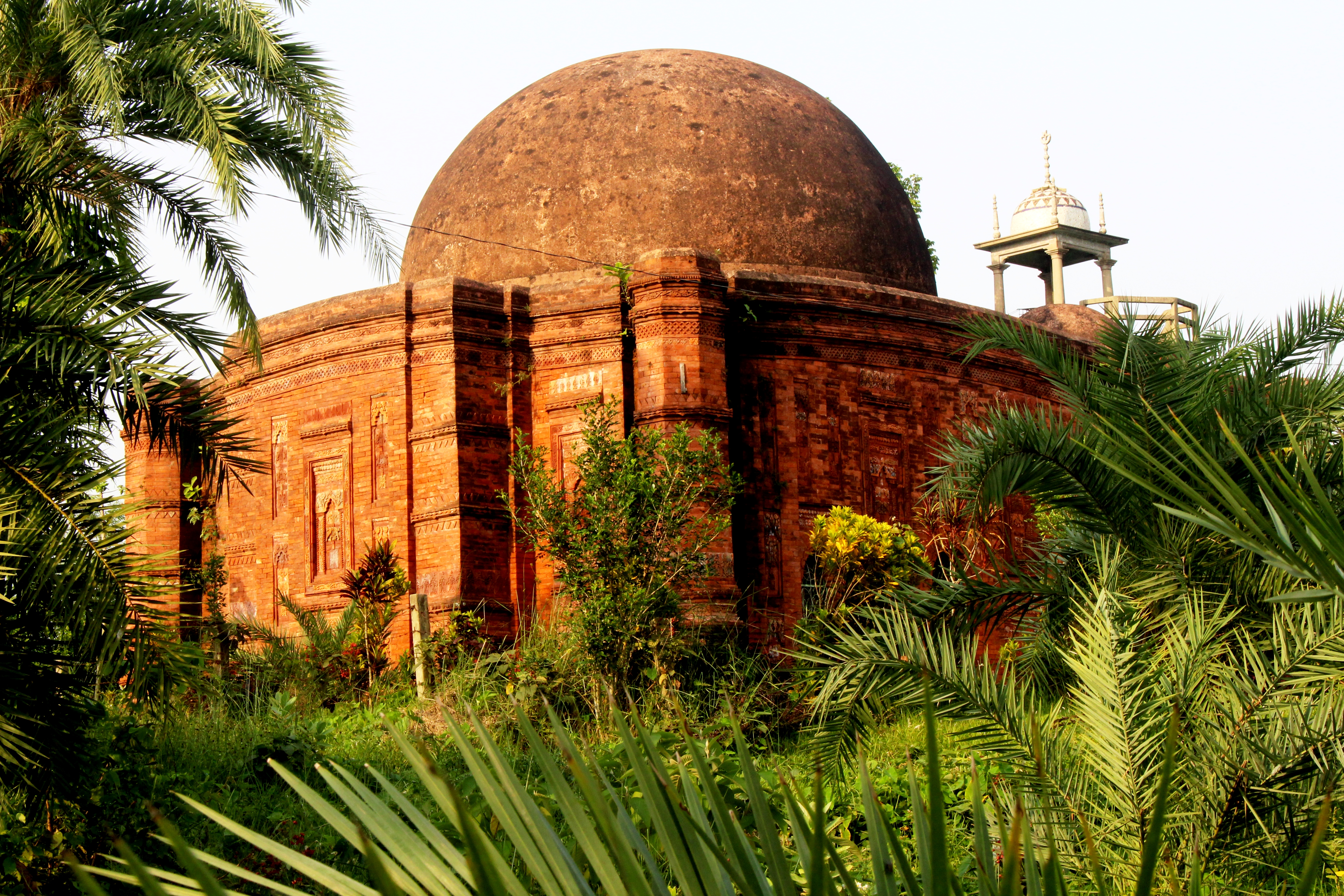
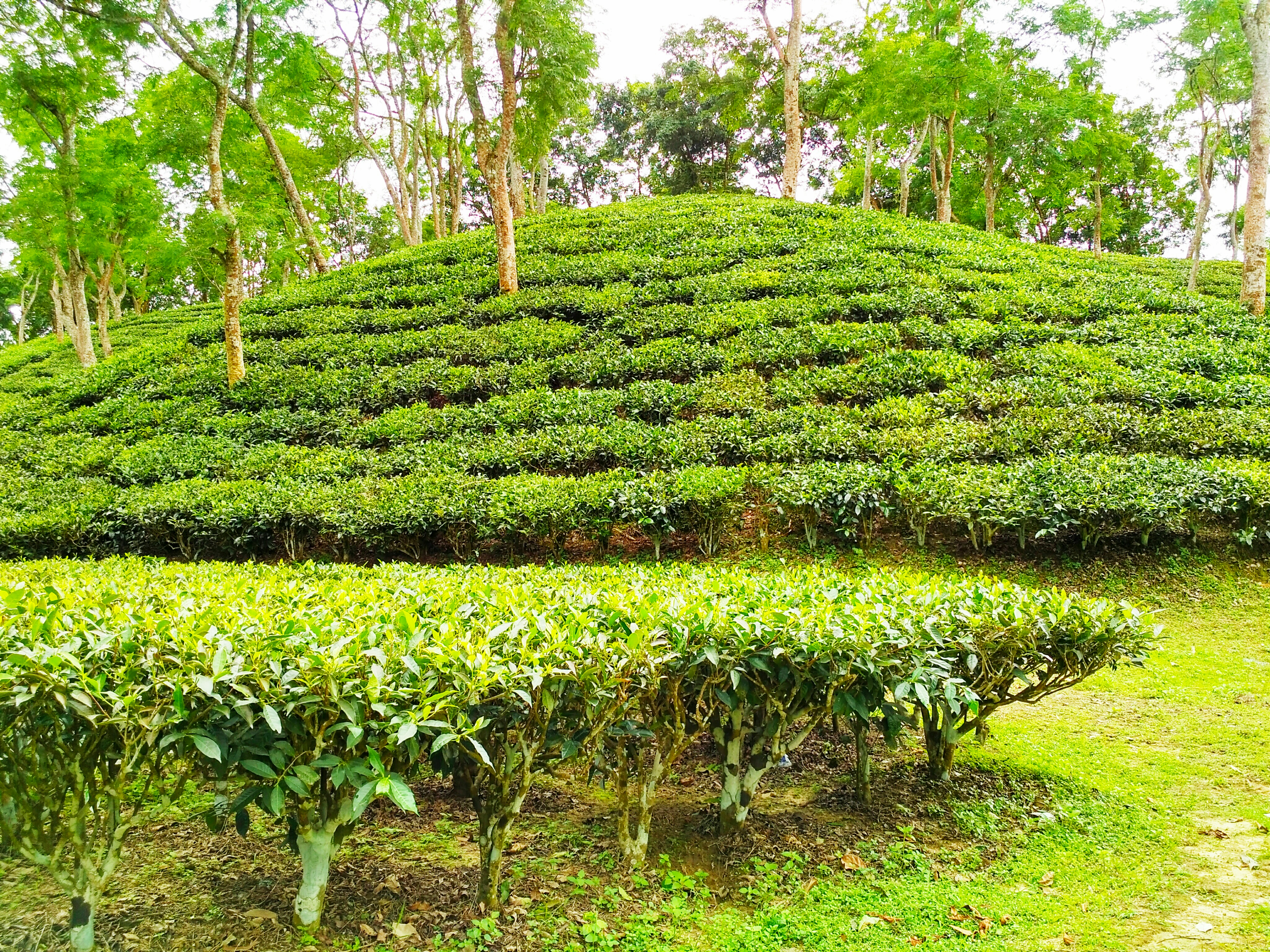
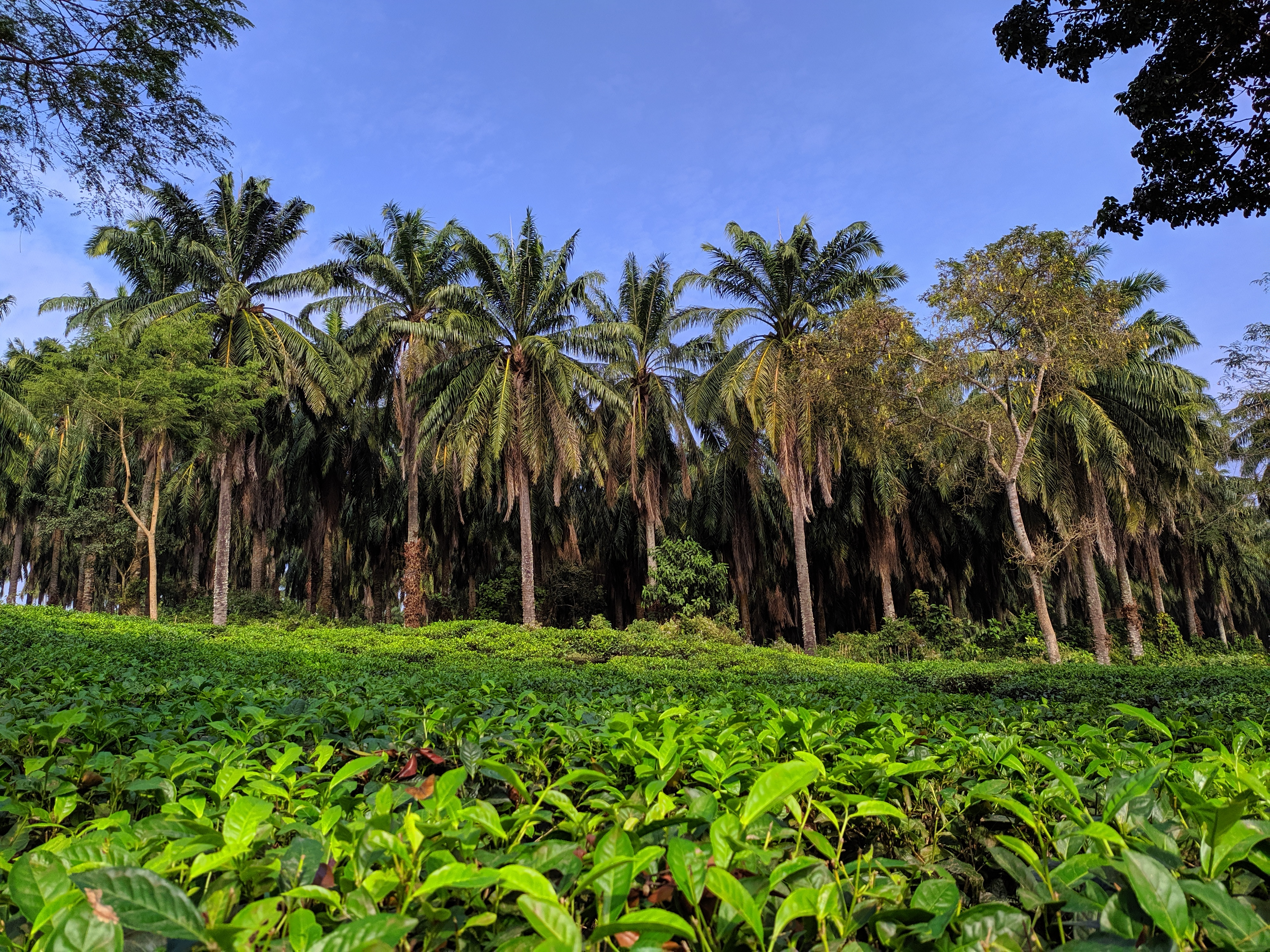
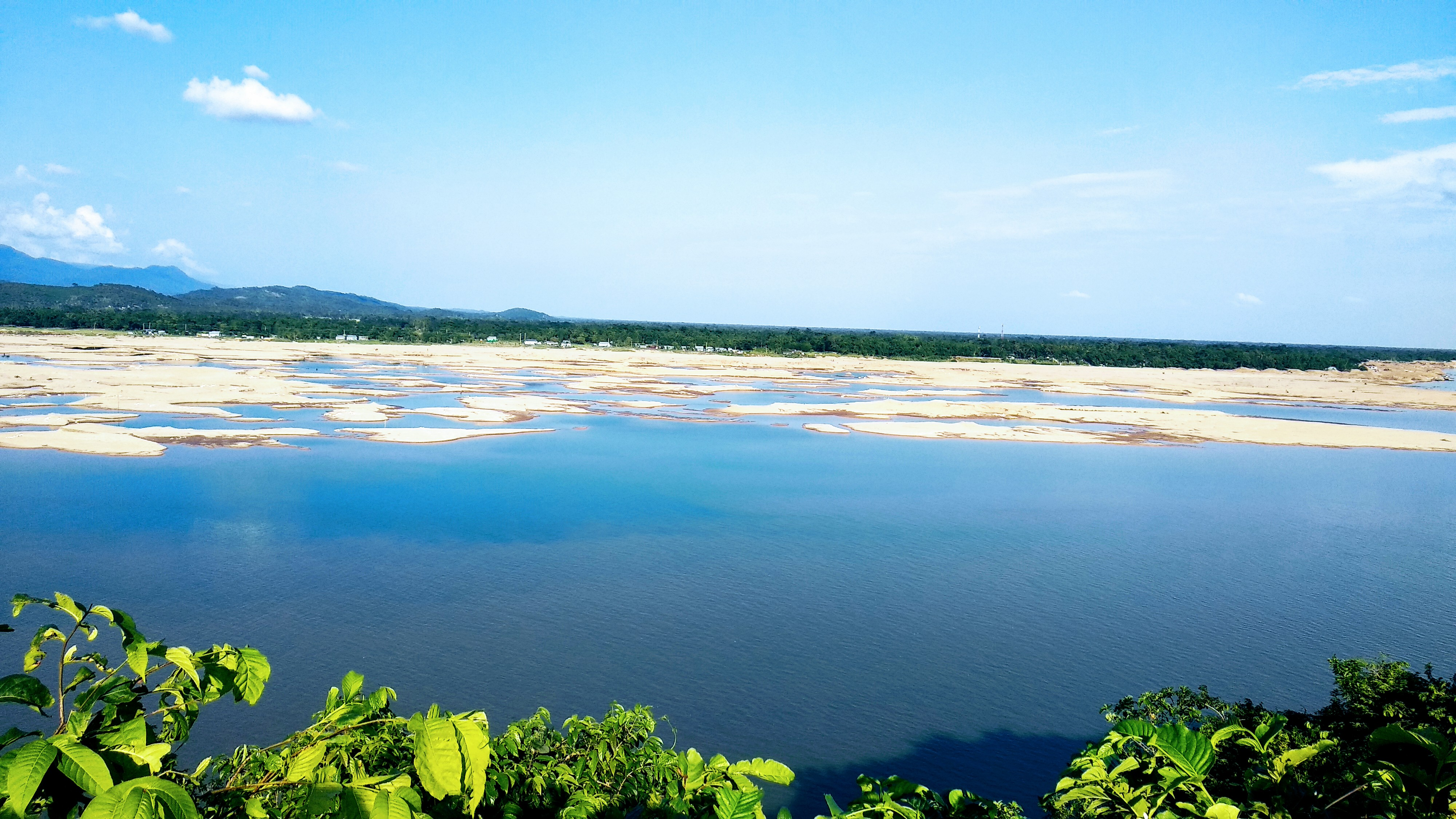
- Clockwise from top-left: Uchail Mosque, Narikel Tea Garden, Satchari National Park, Tea garden in Bahubal Upazila

- Location of Habiganj District in Bangladesh
- Interactive map of Habiganj District
- Country: Bangladesh
- Division: Sylhet Division
- Headquarters: Habiganj

Government
  - Deputy Commissioner: G. M. Sarfaraz

Area
  - Total: 2,636.58 km^{2} (1,017.99 sq mi)

Population (2022)
  - Total: 2,358,886
  - Density: 894.676/km^{2} (2,317.20/sq mi)
- Demonym: Habiganji
- Time zone: UTC+06:00 (BST)
- Postal code: 3300
- Area code: 0831
- ISO 3166 code: BD-20
- HDI (2019): 0.573 medium · 20th of 20
- Website: www.habiganj.gov.bd

Habiganj District (Bengali: হবিগঞ্জ জেলা; Bengali pronunciation: [ɦobigɔnd͡ʒ d͡ʒela]), formerly known as Habibganj District (Bengali: হাবিবগঞ্জ জেলা), is a district in Bangladesh, located in the Sylhet Division. Habiganj is an administrative district in the Sylhet Division of northeastern Bangladesh. Based on the number of upazilas, it is classified as a "Category A" district. Situated on the banks of the Khowai River, Habiganj was upgraded to a district on March 1, 1984; prior to that, it had been a subdivision of the Sylhet district since 1878. Baniyachong, the world's largest village, is located in this district. This village is also home to Kamlaranir Sagardighi, the second-largest water body in Bangladesh.

== History ==
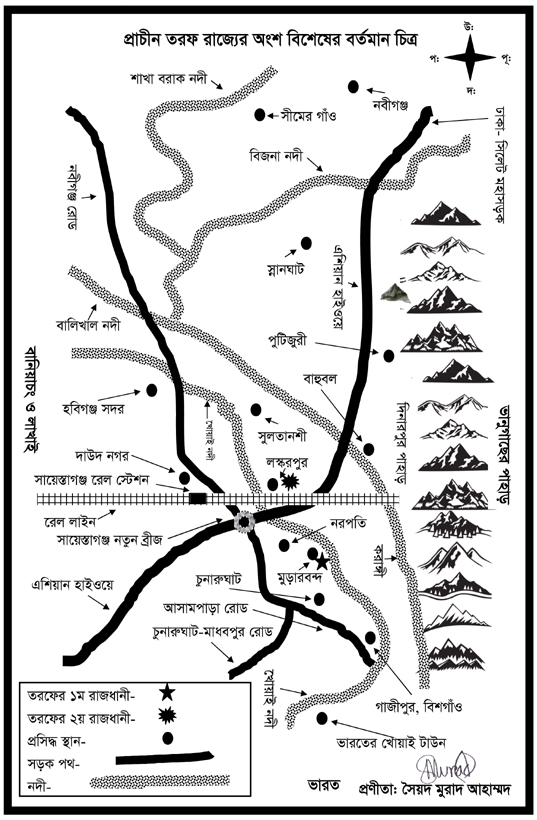
Map of Taraf

=== Ancient ===
Prehistoric settlements were said to have been discovered in the Chaklapunji tea garden, near Chandirmazar of Chunarughat. Habiganj has also revealed a significant number of prehistoric tools from the bed of Balu Stream, a small ephemeral stream (water remains here only for a few hours after rainfall). Angularity and freshness of the fossil wood artifacts suggest that they did not come from a great distance and probably came from nearby hillocks. Typologically, technologically, and morphometrically, the artifacts are more or less the same as those found in the Lalmai, Comilla. The fossil wood assemblages of both of these areas are often classified into two groups: pre-neolithic assemblages without polished tools (hand axes, cleavers, scrapers, chopping tools, points etc.) and neolithic assemblages (hand axes, polished Celts, awls etc.).

The Hindu epic known as the Mahabharata mentions the marriage of Duryodhana of the Kauravas into a family that are thought to be inhabitants of present-day Habiganj.

=== Early medieval ===
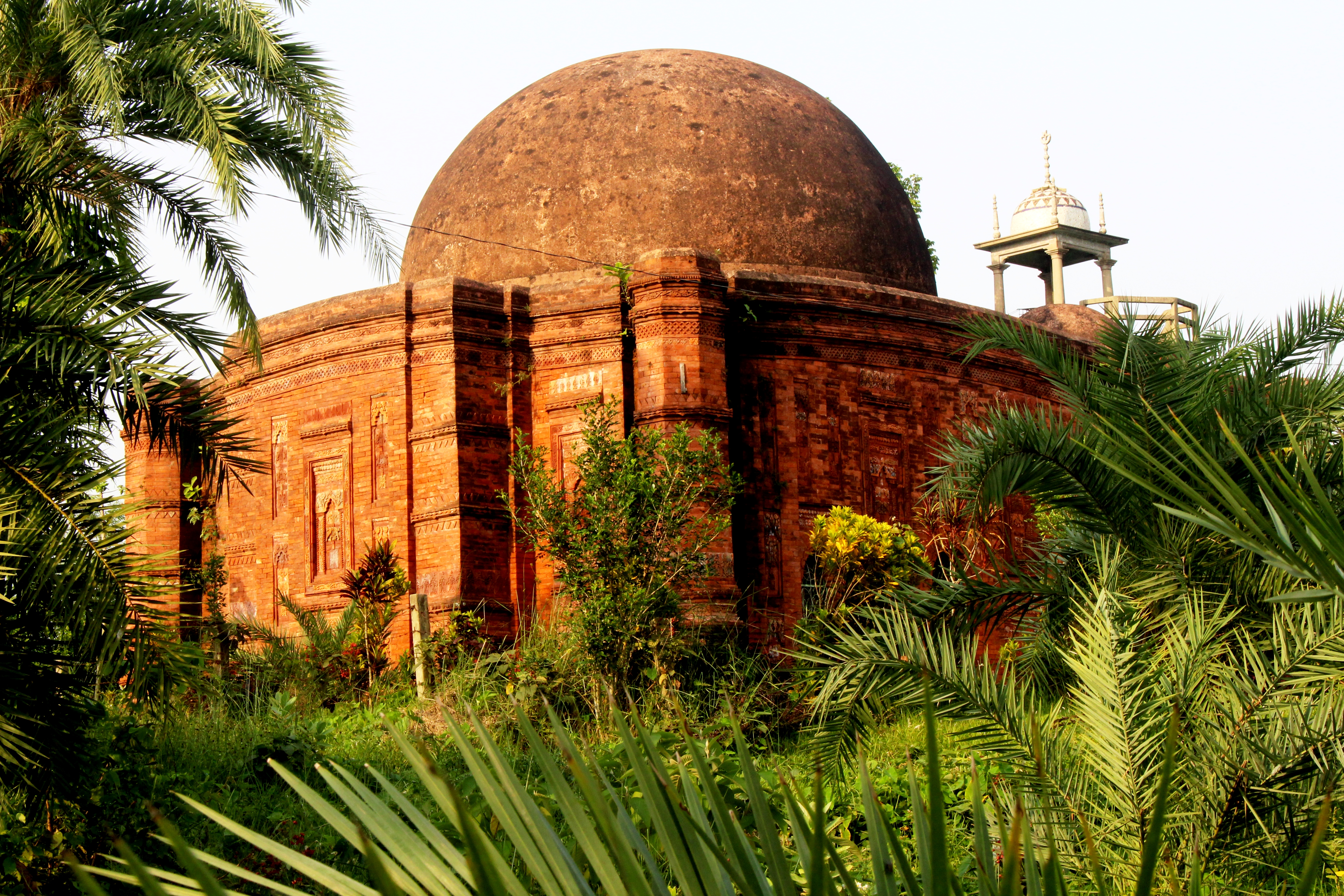
Shankarpasha Shahi Masjid was built by Shah Majlis Amin, one of the 12 Saint who took participation of the Capture of Taraf in 1304.

Historically, Habiganj was part of the Srihatta and Shilhatta region — which encompassed the current Greater Sylhet region. Though the borders of the kingdoms changed frequently, the region was ruled by the Buddhist and Hindu kingdoms of Harikela and Kamarupa before passing to the control of the Chandra, Sena and Deva dynasties in the early medieval period. Parts of the current district of Habiganj were part of the Tungachal Kingdom — a vassal state of the Gour Kingdom — with its capital being in present-day Chunarughat Upazila.

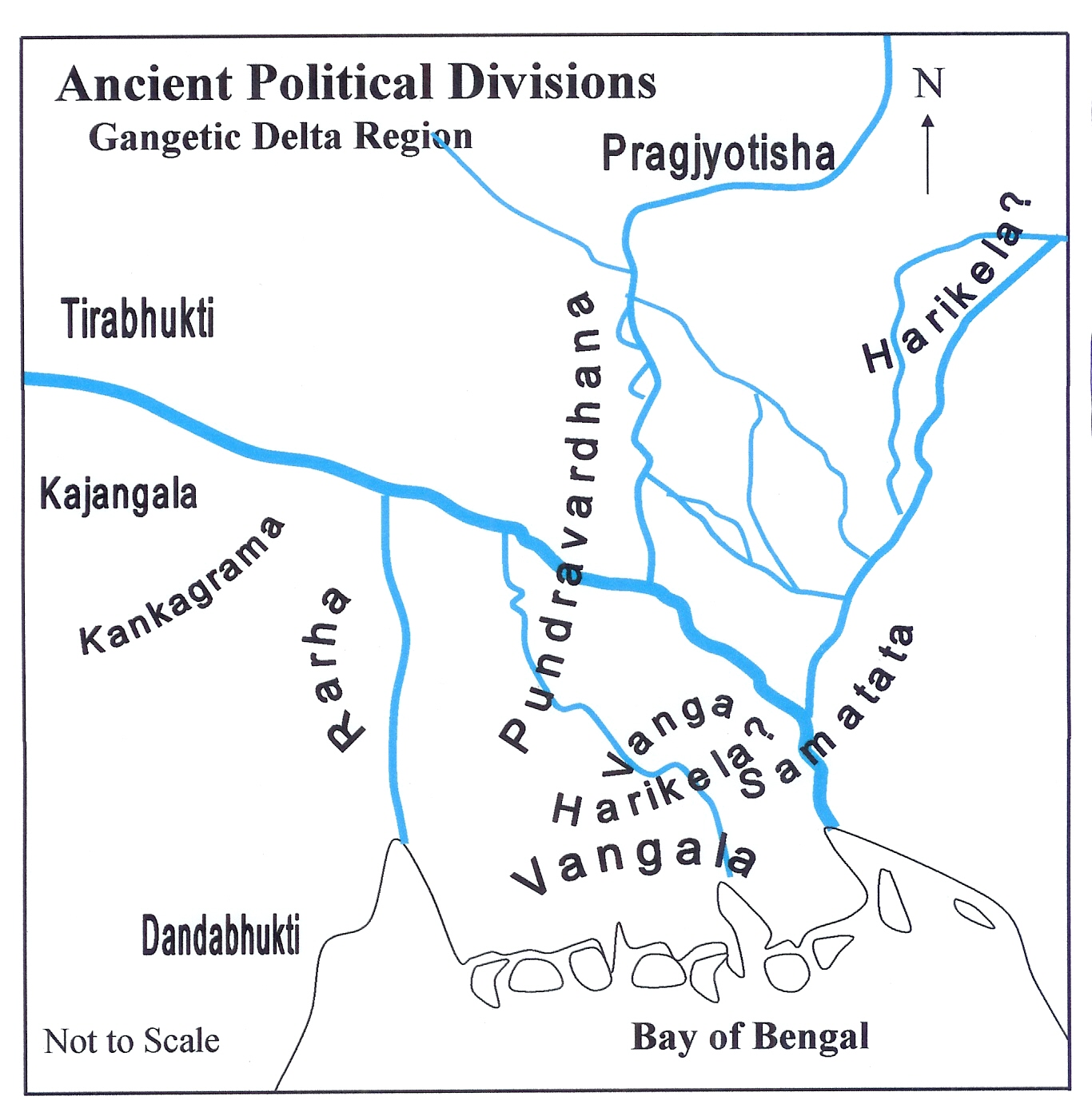
Map of Harikela

The Kamarupa state, the first historical kingdom of Assam, ruled from 350 to 1140 CE and occasionally took control of what is now modern day Habiganj district. Srichandra, the second king of the Chandra dynasty, led invasions into Kamarupa. The Paschimbhag copperplate inscription issued in 935 CE describes the land grant of 20,000 acres (8,100 ha) to build the Chandrapur University; though the location of the university is still unknown, Padmanath Bhattacharya, historian of the Kamarupa Kingdom and translator of the Nidhanpur copperplate inscription, claimed that Chandrapur was situated somewhere in the Habiganj District.

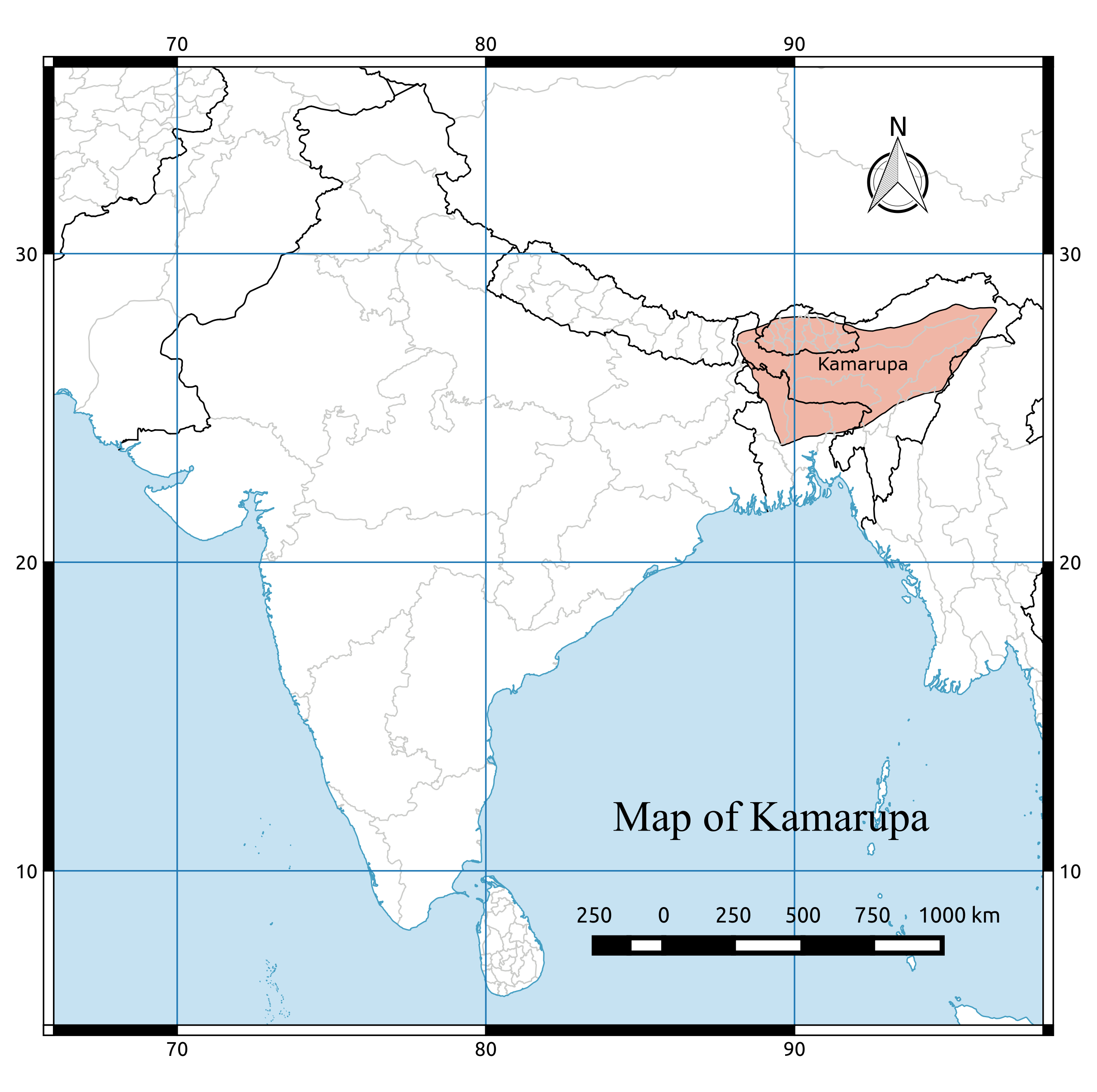
The 7th and 8th century extent of Kamarupa kingdom, located on the eastern region of the Indian subcontinent, what is today modern-day Assam, Bengal and Bhutan. Kamarupa at its height covered the entire Brahmaputra Valley, parts of North Bengal, Bhutan and northern part of Bangladesh, and at times portions of West Bengal and Bihar.

In medieval times, there were numerous petty kingdoms that were situated in what is now Habiganj District such as Azmardan, Baniachang, and Tungachal. In 1254, the Governor of Bengal Malik Ikhtiyaruddin Iuzbak invaded the Azmardan Raj. He defeated the local Raja, and plundered his wealth.

The feudal kingdom of Tungachal was given to Epivishnu by Raja Upananda of Brahmachal in the 11th century. It was based in Rajapur in southern Habiganj. Following the murder of Upananda by the Gour Kingdom loyalists, Epivishnu refused to acknowledge Tungachal as a part of Gour. This led to a battle in 1258 on the banks of Ghungi Jurir Haor in Tungachal in which Epivishnu was murdered and Shandul was subsequently appointed as Tungachal's governor by Raja Govardhan of Gour. In response to Epivishnu's murder, the King of Tripura managed to annex Tungachal away from Gour and appointed Bhadra Janardan, Epivishnu's minister, to govern Tungachal. Janardan was deposed during the reign of Govinda of Gour and replaced by Achak Narayan.

Following the Islamic Conquest of Sylhet in 1303, Syed Nasiruddin led a contingent of 1,000 soldiers along with the help of 12 Muslim saints to capture Tungachal in 1304. Nasiruddin was the military commander of Shamsuddin Firuz Shah, the Sultan of Lakhnauti (in western Bengal). After the successful capture and defeat of Achak Narayan, Tungachal was renamed to Taraf and incorporated into Bangalah (Bengal). Taraf was transformed to an esteemed centre of study in the subcontinent.

=== Late medieval ===
Between the thirteenth and early seventeenth centuries, parts of Habiganj were a part of the state of Nasirabad, based in Mymensingh.

Syed Musa became the zamindar of Taraf in the 16th century. During his office, the King of Tripura Amar Manikya called upon the Baro-Bhuiyans to contribute labourers to aid in the digging of a reservoir tank. Musa refused to accept such subordination to the Twipra Kingdom. As a result, the Battle of Jilkua emerged in 1581 leading to the imprisonment of Musa and his son Syed Adam Bairam.

By the middle of the 15th century, when all the divisions of Laur were united under the headship of Baniachang House (now of Muslim faith), it seems the Muslim area of Taraf passed under the control of Baniachung, which now became very powerful to include in its territory, the whole of present Sunamganj and Habiganj subdivisions. A town by the name of Habibganj was founded by Syed Habib Ullah who belonged to the Syed zamindar dynasty of Taraf. The name Habibganj eventually turned into Habiganj.

In Baniachang, a battle occurred between the Baro-Bhuiyan zamindars of Baniachang (Anwar Khan and Husayn Khan) with the Mughal army in the 17th century, which can be found in the Bahrastan-i-Gayebi. Khwaja Usman fled Bukai Nagar Fort and established a shelter at Putijuri on the foot of the Giripal. He also established a fort at Putijuri, which was extremely important for defense. The Mughal army took the advantage when Khwaja Osman's brother was absent from the fort, leading to the successful annexation of Baniachang and Taraf into Mughal Bengal.

Taraf was incorporated into the Sarkar of Sylhet. The Mughals made use of the fort at Taraf, often camping whilst on expeditions to defeat other rebellious chieftains such as Pahlawan of Matang and Bayazid Karrani II of Sylhet. With the establishment of the East India Company and later the British Raj, Taraf continued to exist as a pargana or fiscal division within Sylhet. Its area was 79.65 square miles, consisted of 1601 estates and had a land revenue of £4400 as of 1875.

=== Modern ===
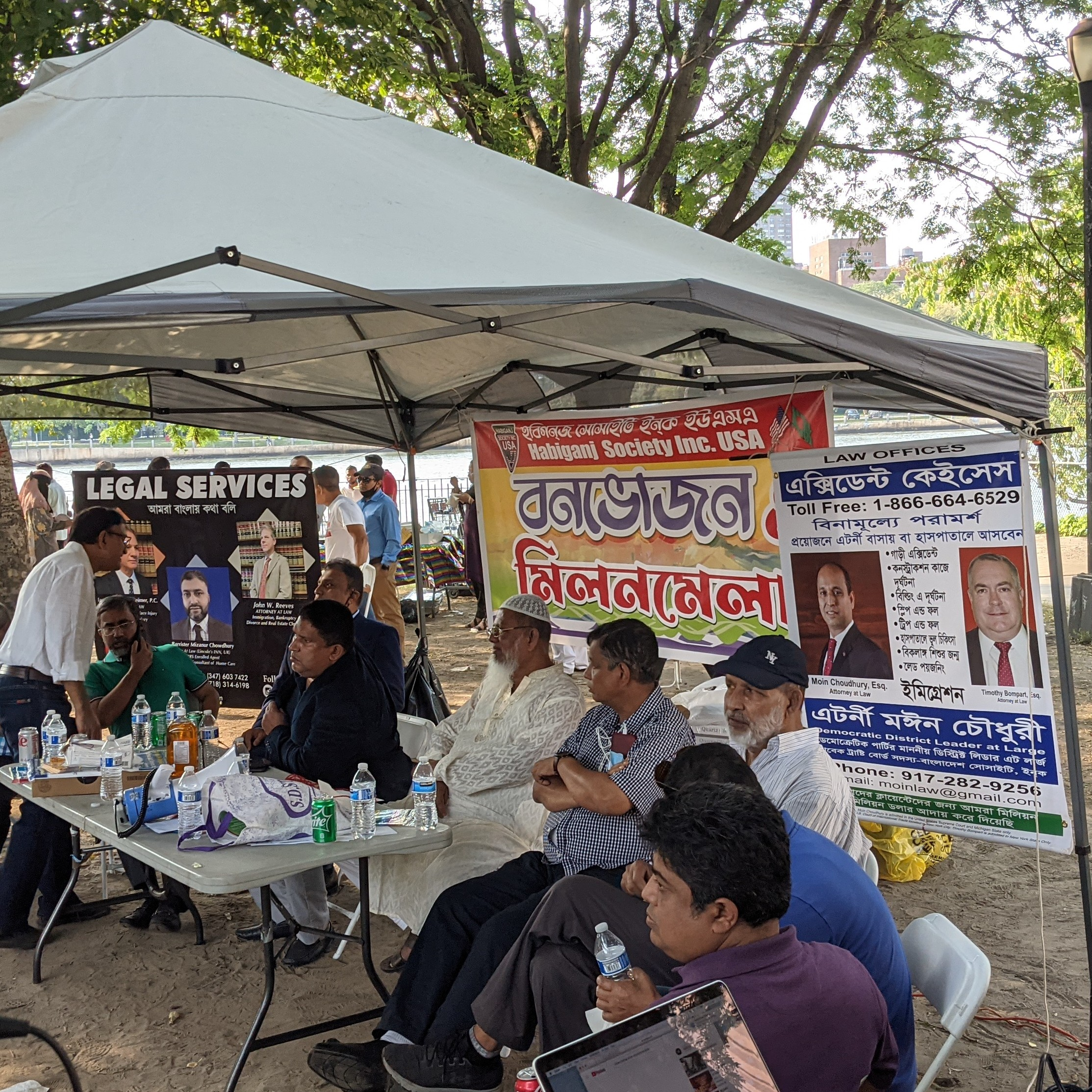
Habiganj diaspora festival in the New York City borough of Queens.

During the British Raj, Habiganj was established as a Thana (police precinct) in 1790, under Dhaka district (1779–1793).

In the second session of the Congress held in Calcutta in 1886, the Indian National Congress was able to attract representatives from Habiganj District. Until 1896, Habiganj's administrative centre was in Court Andar, Laskarpur. On 12 September 1874 it came under Sylhet district (part of Assam). Habiganj was declared as subdivision in 1867. On 7 April 1893, according to Notification #273 of Assam Provincial Government, Habiganj Thana (Administrative unit) was established. Habiganj was rejoined with East-Bengal (now Bangladesh) in 1911. Then the Office of the Circle Officer (Development) was established in 1960.

Habiganj is the historical place where the Mukti Bahini started their first guerrilla movement against rule of Pakistan Army. On 4 April 1971, during Bangladesh War of Independence, the senior army officers assembled at the headquarters of 2nd East Bengal Regiment at Teliapara, a semi-hilly area covered by tea gardens where General MAG Osmani, Lieutenant Colonel Abdur Rob, Lieutenant Colonel Salahuddin Mohammad Reja, Major Kazi Nuruzzaman, Major Khaled Mosharraf, Major Nurul Islam, Major Shafat Jamil, Major Mainul Hossain Chowdhury, and others were present.

At this meeting four senior commanders were entrusted with the responsibility of operational areas. Sylhet-Brahmanbaria area was placed under the command of Major Shafiullah, Comilla-Noakhali area was given to Major Khaled Mosharraf while Chittagong-Chittagong Hill Tracts was given to Major Ziaur Rahman and Kushtia-Jessore area was placed under command of Major Abu Osman Chowdhury. In the meeting the organization concept of the freedom fighter forces and the command structure were chalked out under the command of General MAG Osmani.

On 16 November 1971, Mukti Bahini fighter Jagat Jyoti and 11 villagers were killed in an encounter with the Pakistan army.

On 1 March 1984, Habiganj was established as a district under CMLA Hussain Muhammad Ershad's decentralization programme.

== Geography ==
Habiganj is located at 24.3750°N 91.4167°E. Its area is 2,636.58 km^{2} and bounded by Sunamganj District to the north, Tripura of India and Moulvibazar District to the east, Balaganj Upazila of Sylhet to the north-east, Brahmanbaria and Kishoreganj districts to the west.

This part of Bangladesh is characterized by alluvial plains which are dissected by various connecting rivers as well as streams, lakes; and it is vulnerable to both flood and drought. The land is devoted mainly to agriculture due to its fertile alluvial soils.

=== Land ===
Cultivated agricultural land: 1,54,953 hectare (60.22% of the total agricultural land). Forestland 95 11,644 hectare (4.53% of the total land). For crops 51.6% single-crop, 38.7% double-crop and 9.7% triple-crop; fallow 521 hectares. Its rivers include Barak, Bheramahana, Gopala, Kalni, Kalishiri, Khowai, Korangi, Kushiara, Meghna River(lower), Ratna, Shwasanali, shutki, sonai, Korangi, Shutang, Tentulia, Jhingri, Bizna, Yojnal, and Lohor.

== Demography ==
Historical population
Year	Pop.	±% p.a.
1974	1,082,485	—
1981	1,277,366	+2.39%
1991	1,526,609	+1.80%
2001	1,757,665	+1.42%
2011	2,089,001	+1.74%
2022	2,358,886	+1.11%

According to the 2022 Census of Bangladesh, Habiganj District had 491,884 households and a population of 2,358,886, of whom, 15.03% of the inhabitants lived in urban areas. The population density was 895 people per km^{2}. 22.13% of the population was under 10 years of age. Habiganj had a literacy rate (age 7 and over) of 69.44%, compared to the national average of 74.80%, and a sex ratio of 94.16 males per 1000 females.

Religions in Habiganj District (2022)
Religion	Percent
Islam	83.98%
Hinduism	15.86%
Other or not stated	0.16%

Religion in present-day Habiganj District
Religion	1941 (Note: 1941 figures are for Habiganj subdivision of erstwhile Sylhet district, which roughly corresponds to the present district.)		1981		1991		2001		2011		2022	
Religion	Pop.	%	Pop.	%	Pop.	%	Pop.	%	Pop.	%	Pop.	%
Islam	434,536	59.43%	997,421	78.08%	1,224,853	80.23%	1,431,886	81.47%	1,731,168	82.87%	1,981,089	83.98%
Hinduism	260,457	35.62%	265,655	20.80%	291,860	19.12%	321,077	18.27%	352,407	16.87%	374,104	15.86%
Tribal religion	35,794	4.90%	—N/a	—N/a	—N/a	—N/a	—N/a	—N/a	—N/a	—N/a	—N/a	—N/a
Others (Note: Including Jainism, Christianity, Buddhism, Zoroastrianism, Judaism, Ad-Dharmis, or not stated)	364	0.05	14,290	1.12%	9,896	0.65%	4,702	0.26%	5,426	0.26%	2,761	0.12%
Total Population	731,151	100%	1,277,366	100%	1,526,609	100%	1,757,665	100%	2,089,001	100%	2,358,886	100%

Muslims make up 83.98% of the population, while Hindus are 15.86% of the population. There is a population of 2,300 Christians, mainly among the ethnic minorities.

The ethnic population is 41,573 (1.76%), of which 13,152 are Munda, 6,666 Santal, 3,184 Bhumij and 2,551 Oraon. Most of the ethnic minorities are workers from the tea gardens whose ancestors were brought to the region by the British

== Economy ==
- Tea Gardens: 24 covering total area 15,703.24 hectare.
- Rubber gardens: 3 Rupaichhara-Bahubal (1981). Half of this garden is situated in Habiganj and the rests are in Shreemangal, total area 2,000 acres (8.1 km^{2}). Shahjibazar-Chunarughat(1978) area 2,004 acres (8.11 km^{2}), Shatgaon Rubber garden (1971) area 200 acres (0.81 km^{2}).

Rashidpur gas field (1960), Bibiana gas field (1998) and Habiganj gas field (1963). The approximate stock of these gas fields is 5.5 Trillion Cubic Feet. Habiganj gas field lies in Madhabpur Upazila. This field was also discovered by Pakistan Shell Oil Company in 1963. The structure measures 12x5 square km with a vertical closure of 300 m which has a roughly sub-meridian axis tilted slightly eastward at the northern end. Total recoverable gas reserve of this field re-estimated by Hydrocarbon Unit is 3,852.30 billion cubic feet (1.09085×10^{11} m^{3}). Commercial gas production from this field was commenced in 1968 and till 31 August 2006 total 1,364.474 billion cubic feet (3.86376×10^{10} m^{3}) or 35.42 percent of reserves has been recovered.

== Literature and culture ==
Habigang is famous for folk Literature: Mahuya Sundari and Dhupar Path.

Local newspapers: Daily Habiganj Express, Daily Pravakar, Pratidener Bani, weekly Swadhikar, Swadeshbarta, Drishtikon, Daily Khowai, Habiganj Samachar, Janatar Dalil, Parikrama, fortnightly Prayas, The Daily Habiganjer Ayna and Mritika.

Defunct local newspapers: monthly Moitri (1909), weekly Projapati (1909), Sree Sree Sonar Gauranga (1329 BS), Palli Bani (1940), weekly Shahid (1948), weekly Jagaran (1955), monthly Avijatrik (1966).

== Archaeological heritage ==
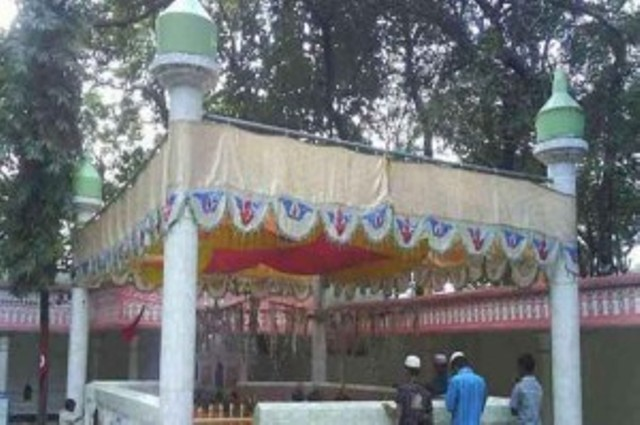
Mazar Sharif of Syed Nasir Uddin, Murarband Darbar Sharif

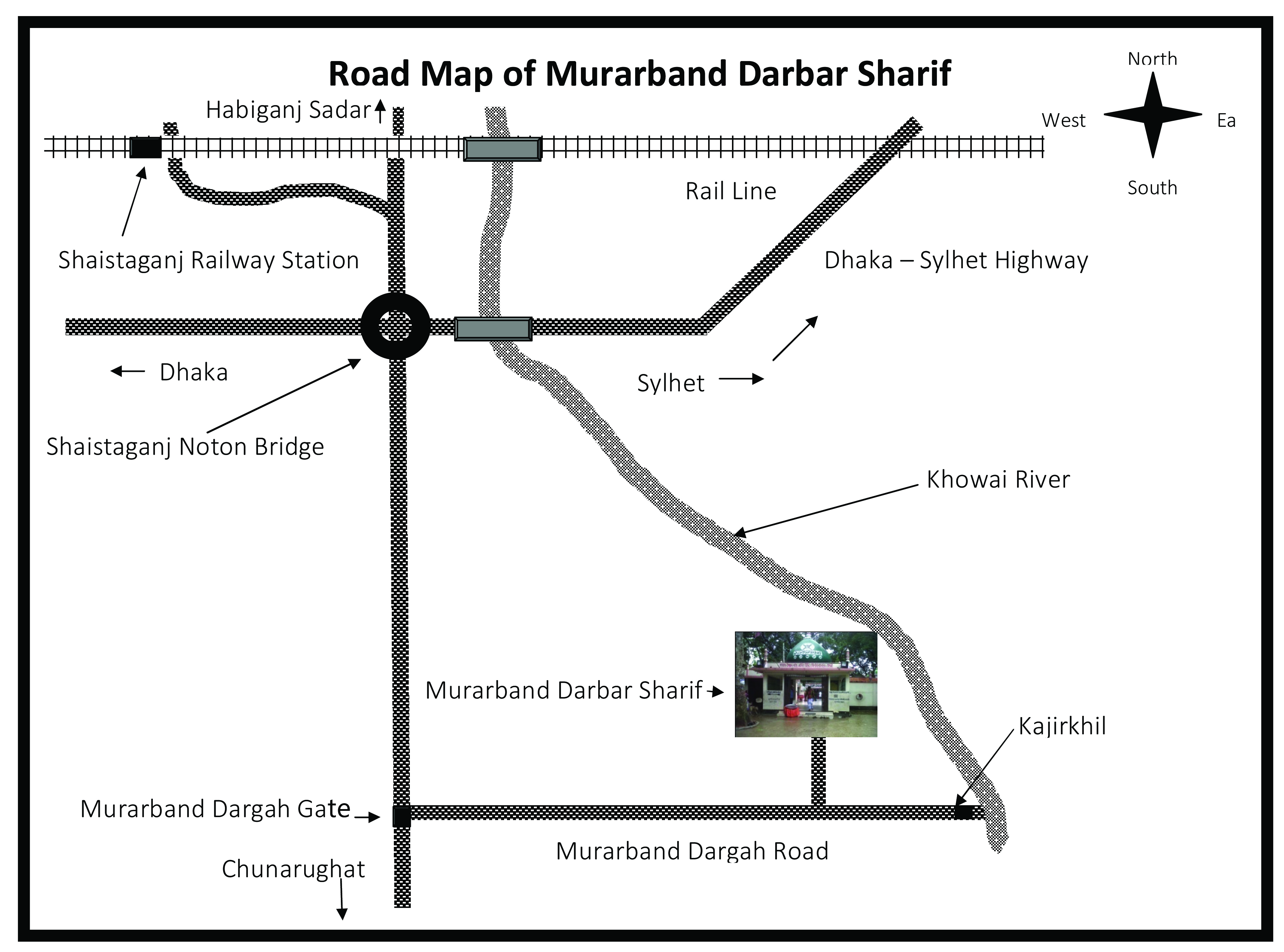
Road Map of Murarband Darbar Sharif

=== Habiganj Sadar ===
- Habiganj Chief Judicial Magistrate District Court, Habiganj Sadar
- Habiganj Bar Association (Traditional), Habiganj Sadar
- Habiganj Municipal Building (foundation and established on 16 December 1940), Habiganj Sadar
- Habiganj Bazar–Shaistaganj–Balla line (established 1928–1929)
- Habiganj Bazar Railway station, Habiganj Sadar
- Habiganj Court Railway station, Habiganj Sadar
- Duliakhal Railway station, Habiganj Sadar
- Paikpara Railway station, Habiganj Sadar
- Habiganj Govt.Technical School and College, Habiganj Sadar
- Habiganj Police Line, Habiganj Sadar
- Habiganj Govt. Polytechnical Institute, Habiganj Sadar
- Habiganj Agriculture University (Public), Habiganj Sadar
- Habiganj Medical University (Public), Habiganj Sadar
- Habiganj Govt. High School, Habiganj Sadar
- Habiganj High School & College, Habiganj Sadar
- Habiganj Brindaban Government College, Habiganj Sadar (established 1931)
- Habiganj Mahila College, Habiganj Sadar
- Habiganj Law College, Habiganj Sadar
- Mashulia Akhra, Habiganj Sadar
- Christian Church Missionary, Habiganj Sadar
- Ramakrishna Ashram, Habiganj Sadar
- Uchail Mosque, Habiganj Sadar
- Bagala Matar Mandir, Habiganj
- Kalibari, Habiganj Sadar

=== Shaistaganj ===
- Shaistaganj Junction Railway station (established 1903), Shaistaganj Upazila

=== Chunarughat ===
- Rema-Kalenga Wildlife Sanctuary, Chunarughat Upazila
- Shankarpasha Shahi Masjid, Chunarughat Upazila
- Murarband Dargah Sharif, Chunarughat
- Hujra Khana of Syed Nasir Uddin, Murarbandar Dargah Sharif, Chunarughat.
- Shajeerbazar, Chunarughat Upazila
- Barkota Railway Station, Chunarughat Upazila
- Sakir Muhammad Railway Station, Chunarughat Upazila
- Sutang Bazar Railway Station, Chunarughat Upazila
- Chunarughat Railway Station, Chunarughat Upazila
- Ancient limestone quarries, Chunarughat
- Tea Gardens of Chunarughat
- Amu Road Railway Station, Chunarughat Upazila
- Assampara Railway Station, Chunarughat Upazila
- Balla Railway Station, Chunarughat Upazila
- Balla Land Port (Bangladesh's no. 23 border land port) Balla, Chunarughat
- Balla Border Check Post Custom & Immigration Authority, Chunarughat Upazila

=== Bahubal ===
- The Place (Putijuri Resort), Bahubal
- Jami Mosque, Bahubal
- Putijuri Jami Mosque, Bahubal
- Rashidpur Tea Garden, Bahubal Upazila
- Satisjuri Railway Station

=== Nabiganj ===
- Dorga-tila, Mira-tila and Tangee-tila, Nabiganj
- Foltoli-tila and water fountain, Nabiganj
- Kuri-tila, Black-stone and an Ancient Rajbari, Dinarpur, Nabiganj
- War of Liberation Mass Grave, Nabiganj
- War of Liberation Memorial Monument, Nabiganj

=== Baniachang ===
- Ancient Rajbari (1737–38) at Puranbagh, Baniachang
- Baniachang village (the biggest village in Asia)
- Bibir Dargah Mosque, Baniachang
- Bithangal Akhra, Baniachang
- Shagor(Komola) Dighi, Baniachang
- Sham-baoul Akhra and Doulotpur Akhra, Baniachang
- Kalarduba Tourist Center, Baniachang

=== Ajmiriganj ===
- Chouki court
- River Port

=== Madhabpur ===
- Teliapara war monument
- Teliapara Railway Station
- Industrial park area

=== Lakhai ===
- Krishnapur slaughtered land grave (Bangladesh Independence war 1971), Lakhai Upazila

== Sports ==
The Habiganj Adhunik Stadium is the largest stadium in Habiganj District. The 25,000-capacity venue is used for cricket and football.

== Upazila ==
Habiganj District upazila geocode map

Upazilas of Habiganj

At present Habiganj consists of 9 upazilas, 6 municipalities, 54 wards, 78 union parishads, 124 mahallas, 1241 mouzas and 2076 villages. The upazilas are:

- Ajmiriganj
- Baniachang
- Bahubal
- Chunarughat
- Habiganj Sadar
- Lakhai
- Madhabpur
- Nabiganj
- Shaistaganj

== Railroad ==
- Habiganj Bazar–Shaistaganj–Balla line

Shaistaganj-Habiganj railroad section's four railway station established by Assam Bengal railway 1928

- Habiganj Bazar
- Habiganj Court
- Dhuliakhal
- Paikpara

Shaistaganj Junction

N.B.: Shaistaganj railway station established by Assam Bengal railway 1903. In 1928-29 when the Habiganj Bazar-Shaistaganj-Balla railway link was opened, it became a junction railway station.

Shaistaganj-Chunarughat railroad section's seven railway station established by Assam Bengal railway 1929

- Barkota
- Sakir Muhammed
- Sutang Bazar
- Chunarughat
- Amu Road
- Assampara
- Balla

Habiganj Bazar–Shaistaganj–Balla line During British rule, train services were started by rail at Habiganj Mahukuma in Sylhet district of the then (Undivided British-India) Assam province. In 1928, the British government built the Habiganj Bazar-Shaistaganj-Balla line as railway line and built infrastructure.

The railway line was opened by the Assam Bengal Railway by the then British government from Habiganj district headquarters town to Balla border via Shaistaganj junction, about 45 or 52 kilometers long railway line.

Of these, the Shaistaganj-Habiganj (15 or 16 km) railway line was inaugurated in 1928 and the Shaistaganj-Balla (30 or 36 km) railway line was inaugurated in 1929.

Coal-engined trains used to run between eight stations at Habiganj Bazar, Habiganj Court, Shaistaganj Junction, Shakir Mohammad, Chunarughat, Amuroad, Assampara and Balla bordering Tripura.

Of these, Chunarughat, Amur road and Assampara stations were of great importance. Tea produced in 22 tea gardens from those three stations was transported by rail.

At that time, this railway was the only means of exporting tea leaves of 13 gardens of Chunarughat upazila of Habiganj at a low cost and importing related items including garden rations.

There are a total of 4 stations on the Shaistaganj-Habiganj railway line (excluding Shaistaganj Junction), namely: Habiganj Bazar, Habiganj Court, Dhuliakhal and Paikpara. The Shaistaganj-Balla railway line has a total of 7 stations (excluding Shaistaganj Junction), namely: Barkula, Shakir Muhammed, Sutang Bazar, Chunarughat, Amu Road, Assampara and Balla.

After the independence of Bangladesh, the importance of the Balla train increased further. For this reason, the railway authorities built two more stations named Sutang Bazar and Barkula, known as remote areas.

At that time, the role of the train in bringing back refugees from India was commendable. At that time, a diesel engine was added to the ballar train. The train used to travel twice a day from Habiganj to the border station Balla.

After the end of the refugee transportation phase, the smugglers took over the train in Balla. Later, the train of Balla became a train of smugglers. At first, the passengers protested about this, but later the passengers got the opportunity to travel without a ticket.

In such a situation, the running train suffered losses. The railway authorities suspended the renovation work of the railway line. The train continues at great risk. The speed comes down to 15 kilometers.

During the tenure of the military ruler Ershad government, the train movement on this route was stopped unannounced for the first time. In the face of the movement of passengers, the train started running again within a week. A few days after the BNP came to power in 1991, the movement of the ballar train was again stopped unannounced.

Various social organizations started a movement demanding the movement of trains. For this reason, the government decided to run the train under private management. After running under private management for some time, the train was stopped again.

After the Awami League government came to power in 1996, the then Finance Minister late Shah AMS Kibria, (Member of parliament) elected from Habiganj Sadar-Lakhai Upazila (Habiganj-3) constituency, under the sincere political efforts of the late Shah AMS Kibria, the railway line was upgraded in 2000. Although the train service was started, the last train movement on this line was stopped in 2003.

Ever since the undeclared closure of the BNP-Jamaat coalition government, an influential quarter has been looking at the huge resources of the railways. Around 2005, about 15 kilometers of railway line from Habiganj Bazar to Shaistaganj railway junction was removed on the pretext of making a road. Later, the railway line from Shaistaganj to Habiganj was lifted and a bypass road was constructed.

The Habiganj-Balla train could not be restarted even after a long time. Railway land worth crores of rupees has been occupied by breaking the name of politics. Railway employees who used to stay at different stations are also living by occupying railway land and constructing buildings. Some employees are pocketing money by constructing buildings on railway land and installing tenants.

In 2003, the railway line was abandoned after the train service on this route was stopped. Since then, railway property worth crores of rupees has been looted. In the meantime, valuable equipment of the road and furniture of the station house have been looted.

Now the railway land is being occupied. A section of people are occupying these lands and building buildings. They are cultivating various crops. The name of Shaistaganj Junction is associated with the abandoned railway line. The locals demanded that the train be restarted on this railway line soon to protect the tradition of the junction.

After the Awami League government came to power in 2008, railway minister late Suranjit Sengupta was accorded a reception by the people of Shaistaganj. At that time, he assured that the Balla train would be started within a few days. When Suranjit Sen became a political victim, the train from Habiganj Sadar to Balla could not be started again.

The train from Habiganj Sadar to Balla is still closed. Locals said four of the habiganj-Shaistaganj-Balla railway stations are located in Habiganj Sadar upazila and seven in Chunarughat upazila. Shaistaganj Junction in Shaistaganj Upazila. That is why on the eve of the 11th parliamentary election, various demands were raised from the common people, including the introduction of the Ballar train from Habiganj Sadar, the recovery of the land of the train.

During the election campaign, Awami League leaders also assured to start the Ballar train from Habiganj Sadar, but even after the past years, no word has been uttered from the leaders about the introduction of the train. The expectations of the people of Chunarughat-Madhabpur upazila (Habiganj-4) have increased a lot after Mahbub Ali, (Member of parliament), became the state minister for civil aviation and tourism.

The common people think that Minister Mahbub Ali can restart the Balla train from Habiganj Bazar i.e. Habiganj Sadar to Chunarughat Balla Land Port, and Habiganj district.

Railway History

The Habiganj Bazar–Shaistaganj–Balla line is a railway line connecting Akhaura and Chhatak, via Kulaura in Bangladesh. This line is under the jurisdiction of Bangladesh Railway. Shaistaganj Junction railway station is a junction station situated in Shayestaganj Upazila of Habiganj District in Bangladesh. It was opened in 1903 on Akhaura–Kulaura–Chhatak line. Then it became a junction station when Habiganj Bazar–Shaistaganj–Balla line railway was opened in 1928–29. But later in 2003, that line was abandoned as is closed in an unannounced manner and in 2005, the Habiganj Bazar–Shaistaganj line was taken off.

In response to the demands of the Assam tea planters for a railway link to Chittagong port, Assam Bengal Railway started construction of a railway track on the eastern side of Bengal in 1891. A 150 kilometres (93 mi) track between Chittagong and Comilla was opened to traffic in 1895. The Comilla–Akhaura–Kulaura–Badarpur section was opened in 1896–98 and extended to Lumding by 1903.

The Kulaura-Sylhet section was opened 1912–15, the Shaistaganj-Habiganj branch line in 1928, the Shaistaganj–Balla branch line in 1929 and the Sylhet–Chhatak Bazar line in 1954.

A metre gauge link exists between Shahbajpur in Bangladesh and Mahisasan in India.

== Education ==
There are 20 colleges (3 of which are government-run), 3 technical schools and colleges, 1 polytechnic institute, 95 high schools (6 of which are government-run), and hundreds of primary schools in the district.

== Notable people ==
- Nurul Islam Olipuri (born 1955), Islamic scholar
- Tafazzul Haque Habiganji, former vice-president of Hefazat-e-Islam and Jamiat Ulema-e-Islam
- Sirajul Hossain Khan, former minister (1985–1990), MP, journalist and former general secretary of East Pakistan Journalist Union, leftist politician.
- Major General Mohammad Abdur Rab (Bir Uttam), Chief of Staff of Independence Forces
- Shah Kibria, former Finance Minister of Bangladesh, d. 2005
- Dewan Farid Gazi, veteran politician (Awami League) and freedom fighter/activist, former minister of Bangladesh
- Dewan Mahbubur Rob Sadi Chaudhuri (Bir Protik), Sub-Sector Commander (1971), Former MP
- Major General Chitta Ranjan Dutta- Bir Uttam
- Jagat Joity Das - Bir Bikrom
- Enamul Haque Mostafa Shahid, veteran politician (Awami League) and freedom fighter/activist, former Social Welfare Minister of Bangladesh, d. 2016
- Mukhlesur Rahman Chowdhury, former advisor to the President of Bangladesh and minister
- Hemango Biswas, nationalist leader, poet and singer
- Shegufta Bakht Chaudhuri, fourth Governor of Bangladesh Bank, former advisor, Caretaker Govt of Bangladesh
- Syed A. B. Mahmud Hossain, Chief Justice of Bangladesh
- Justice Syed Husain, Chief Justice (since 27 January 2004)
- Bipin Chandra Pal, one of the main architects of the Swadeshi movement and part of the Lal Bal Pal triumvirate
- Niranjan Pal, playwright and screenwriter
- B. Roy Chowdhury, footballer and Swadeshi movement activist
- Hamza Choudhury, football Player in the Premier League

== See also ==
- Upazilas of Bangladesh
- Districts of Bangladesh
- Divisions of Bangladesh
- Upazila
- Thana
