= B. Roy Chowdhury =

Bangladeshi footballer

Personal information
- Full name: Bhupendra Kumar Roy Chowdhury
- Date of birth: 1912
- Place of birth: Habiganj, Bengal, British India (present-day Bangladesh)
- Date of death: 21 November 1992 (aged 80)
- Place of death: Habiganj, Bangladesh
- Position: Left winger

Senior career*
Years	Team	Apps	(Gls)
1937	DSA XI		
1938	East Bengal		
1939–1942	Mohun Bagan		
- * Club domestic league appearances and goals

Bhupendra Roy Chowdhury (Bengali: ভূপেন্দ্র রায় চৌধুরী; 1912 – 21 November 1998) was a Bangladeshi footballer and politician.

== Early life ==
Bhupendra Kumar Roy Chowdhury was born in 1912 in Baniachong Upazila of Habiganj District in Bengal, British India. He became involved with both sports and politics at a young age. Chowdhury became actively involved in the Swadeshi movement during his student years. While in tenth grade at Habiganj High School, he helped organize the reception for Subhas Chandra Bose during his visit to Habiganj in 1931. That same year, he and three of his friends were arrested while hoisting the Indian flag in front of the Habiganj Subdistrict Treasury Office. In a summary trial, the then Subdivisional Officer of Habiganj, Navin Ali, sentenced them to 15 months in prison, and they were sent to Silchar Jail in Assam. After his release, Chowdhury enrolled at Brindaban Government College and founded the Town Club.

== Playing career ==
Chowdhury started playing football with Habiganj Town Club and Naojoan Club, while still being a college student. Eventually, he was invited for football trials in Dhaka for Jagannath College by its principle, Roy Bahadur Satyendranath Bhadra. Despite his families hesitance, Chowdhury moved to Dhaka, successfully trialed for the Jagannath College football team, and was granted free admission to the college. He finished his I.Com degree in 1934, and in the same year, the he captained the college team to the Dhaka University Shield. Impressed by Chowdhury's performance, Dhaka University Vice-Chancellor R. C. Majumdar persuaded him to enroll in the university. Aside from playing football for the university team, Chowdhury also served as the athletics secretary of Jagannath Hall.

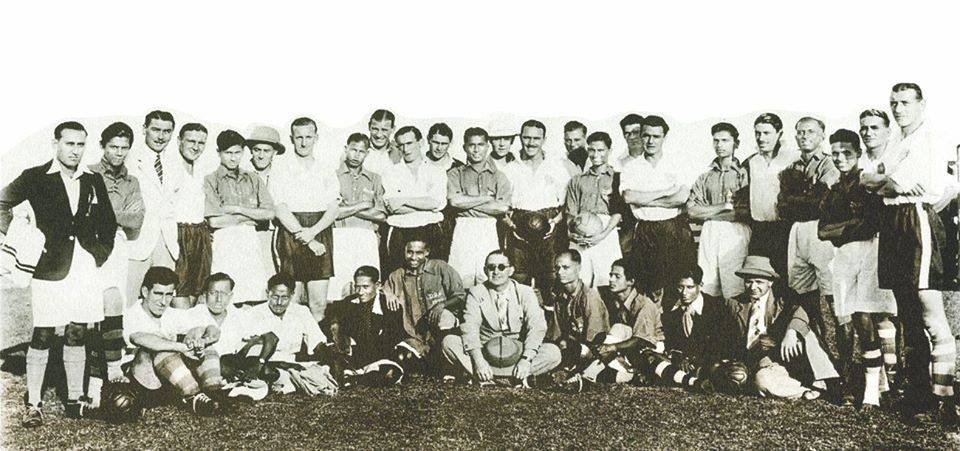
Islington Corinthians and DSA XI team photo on 22 November 1937, Chowdhury sitting third from right

In the mid-1930s, when First Division football began in Silchar, Assam, clubs from Sylhet, Brahmanbaria, Comilla, and Habiganj joined the league. This led Chowdhury and his younger brother, Sachin Roy Chowdhury, to travel regularly from Dhaka to participate. In 1937, Chowdhury represented Dhaka Sporting Association XI (DSA XI) against the touring Islington Corinthians. On 21 November, during the first exhibition match held at the DSA field, Chowdhury played in the left-wing, as Pakhi Sen scored the only goal in a surprise victory for DSA XI. He also played in the second exhibition match, which ended in a 0–1 defeat on 22 November.

In 1938, Chowdhury completed his B.Com degree from Dhaka University and accepted an offer to play for the Kolkata-based East Bengal Club and began plying his trade in West Bengal. In 1939, he joined arch-rivals, Mohun Bagan AC, and spent the following four years at the club, including as captain in 1940, before retiring into politics and sports administration.

== Post-retirement ==
After retiring from football, Chowdhury rejoined the Indian independence movement, focusing his efforts in Sylhet. During this time, he briefly worked as a manager at The Asiatic Bank in Silchar and served as the secretary of Silchar India Club for a few years, eventually receiving life membership. He also served as the honorary president of Mohun Bagan AC. In 1946, Chowdhury was the founding secretary of the Assam Football Association. Following the Partition of India, he moved back to his ancestral home in Baniachong, Habiganj, where he lived until his death. As a distinguished footballer and freedom fighter of the Swadeshi movement, he received an honorary allowance from the Government of India until his passing. In 1973, at a grand conference of anti-British freedom fighters in India, he was honored with a copper crown by then-Prime Minister Indira Gandhi.

== Death ==
Following the Independence of Bangladesh, Chowdhury remained in his residence in Baniachong Upazila, Habiganj District, where he died on 21 November 1992. His son, MLA Roy Chowdhury, is also involved with politics, and serves as the additional secretary of the Ministry of Shipping. An annual football tournament is held in his memory in his home village.

== Bibliography ==
- Mahmud, Dulal (2018). ঢাকার ফুটবলের গৌরবময় সেইদিন (transl. The glorious day of football in Dhaka). Bishhoshahitto Bhobon. ISBN 978-984-93467-8-4.
