= Nurul Islam Olipuri =

Islamic scholar of Bangladesh

Mufassir-e Qur'an Nurul Islam Olipuri Khatib-e-Azam
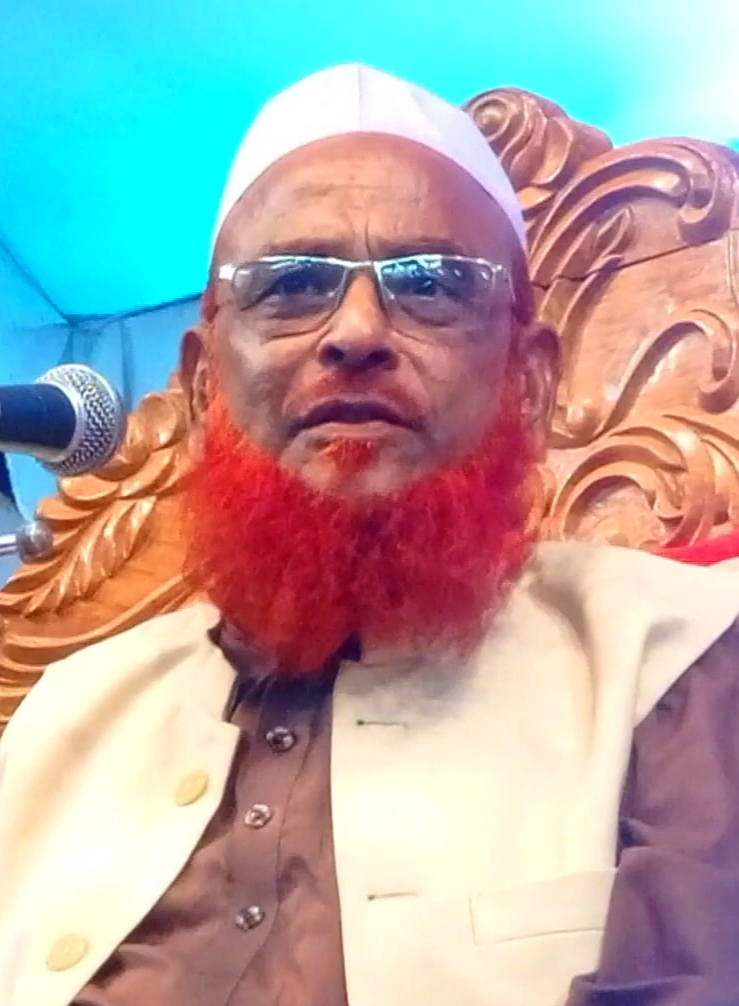

Personal life
- Born: 1955 (age 70–71) Walipur, Habiganj, East Bengal
- Main interest(s): Tafsir, fiqh
- Education: Jamia Qurania Arabia Lalbagh

Religious life
- Religion: Islam
- Denomination: Sunni
- Jurisprudence: Hanafi
- Tariqa: Chishti (Sabiri-Imdadi); Naqshbandi; Qadri; Suhrawardy
- Creed: Maturidi
- Movement: Deobandi

Muslim leader
- Teacher: Gul-e-Nur; Mukhlisur Rahman; Shamsuddin Qasemi
- Disciple of: Shah Ahmad Shafi

Nurul Islam Olipuri (Bengali: নূরুল ইসলাম ওলীপুরী) is an Islamic scholar of Bangladesh. Olipuri is best known for his interpretation of the Qur'an.

== Early life and education ==
Nurul Islam was born in 1955 in the village of Walipur in the Habiganj subdivision of Sylhet district, East Bengal. He belonged to a Bengali Muslim family descended from Naimullah Taluqdar, a distinguished landlord of Gauranger Chowk, and was the youngest of 5 brothers and 2 sisters. His father (Mawlana Abdur Rahim Walipuri), mother, elder brother (Mawlana Abdus Samad Walipuri) and elder sister (Gul-e-Nur) died when he was five years old as a result of a pox epidemic.

Olipuri's first teacher was his elder sister, Gul-e-Nur, who taught him how to read in Arabic and Bengali. He then spent two years at the nearby Sharifabad Primary School, before completing the remainder of his primary education at the Jamia Emdadia Madrasa in Kishoreganj, topping all the students in final exams. He then enrolled at the Jāmiʿah Saʿdiyyah in Raidhar, Habiganj where he topped the final exams again. Among his teachers in Raidhar was Allama Mukhlisur Rahman, who was the successor of Olipuri's father's teacher Mawlana Asadullah. Olipuri then proceeded to study at Jamia Qurania Arabia Lalbagh, from which he graduated with a Masters in Hadith studies in 1975. He then spent a further two years studying Tafsir under Shamsuddin Qasemi at the Jamia Hussainia Arzabad in Mirpur. He then became a murid of Shah Ahmad Shafi.

== Career ==
After completing his institutional education, he taught several topics including Hadith and Tafsir several years in Shāhpur Husayniyyah Madrasah in Chunarughat. After that he worked at his alma-mater Jāmiʿah Saʿdiyyah Raidhar for eight years where he taught Arabic grammar, logic and jurisprudence. He then spent a year teaching at the Jāmiʿah Mahmudiyyah Islamiyyah in Subhanighat, Sylhet. Then, for more than a decade, he served as the chief director of Darus Sunnah Madrasa Mantala in Madhabpur. In 2000, Olipuri established Madrasa Noor-e Madina in Shayestaganj, and has been serving as the founder director. Olipuri has also been a public lecturer at home and overseas. He participated in many debates, most notably in Netrokona (19/6/1997) as well as the Bajitpur debate (18/9/1993) which led to a clash between the two sides and police intervention. During the International Islamic Grand Conference in Comilla on 13 January 2004, Olipuri was conferred the title of Khatib-e-Azam.

== Works ==
Olipuri has written for many magazines such as Monthly Madina, Monthly Muinul Islam, Monthly Tawhidi Parikrama and Weekly Muslim Jahan. His books include:

- Islam, Nurul (2011). Islam O Adhunik Biggan ইসলাম ও আধুনিক বিজ্ঞান [Islam and Modern Science] (in Bengali). Dhaka: Al-Kousar Prokashoni.
- —— (2009). Narir Odikar O Morjadha নারীর মর্যাদা ও অধিকার [Women's Right in Islam] (in Bengali). Dhaka: Maktabatul Ashraf.
- Sermons of Olipuri (মাওয়ায়েজে ওলীপুরী)
- Qadiani Doctrine and Islamic Religion (কাদিয়ানী মতবাদ ও ইসলাম ধর্ম)
- End of Confusion (বিভ্রান্তির অবসান)
- World Muslim Safety Arrangement (বিশ্ব মুসলিম নিরাপত্তা ব্যবস্থা)
- Behind the Sunni name (সুন্নী নামের অন্তরালে)
- Who is a disbeliever by whose verdict? (কার ফতোয়ায় কে কাফের?)
- Light of Medina (নূরে মদীনা)
- Complete Way of Life (পরিপূর্ণ দ্বীন)
- Selected Sermons of Olipuri (নির্বাচিত বয়ান সমগ্র)
- Noor-e Madina (নূরে মাদীনা)

== See also ==
- Muhammad Faizullah
- Abdur Rahman (scholar)
- Fazlul Hoque Amini
- Junaid Babunagari
