= Shankarpasha Shahi Masjid =

Mosque in Habiganj, Bangladesh

- শংকরপাশা শাহী মসজিদ
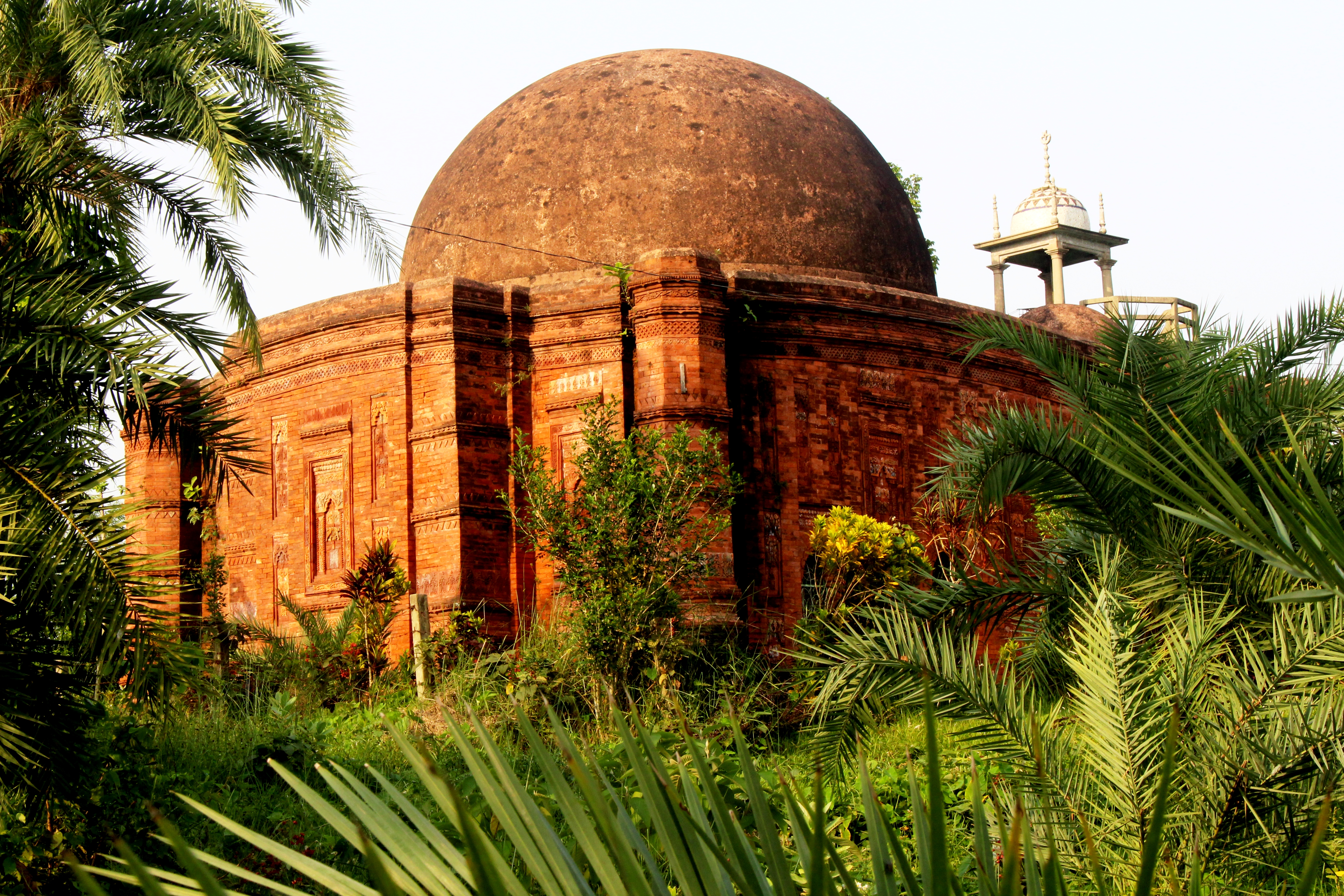

- Location of the mosque in Bangladesh

Religion
- Affiliation: Sunni Islam
- Ecclesiastical or organizational status: Mosque
- Status: Active

Location
- Location: Shankarpasha, Rajiura Union, Habiganj
- Country: Bangladesh
- Interactive map of Shankarpasha Shahi Masjid
- Coordinates: 24°18′08″N 91°21′32″E

Architecture
- Architect: Shah Majlis Amin
- Type: Mosque architecture
- Style: Bengal Sultanate
- Established: 1494-1499 AD

Specifications
- Capacity: 100 worshipers
- Length: 6.5 m (21 ft)
- Width: 6.5 m (21 ft)
- Dome: Four
- Minaret: One
- Materials: Brick

The Shankarpasha Shahi Jame Masjid, (Bengali: শংকরপাশা শাহী মসজিদ), Persian: شاهي مسجد شنكرپاشا), also known as the Uchail Mosque, is a 16th-century mosque, located in the Habiganj Sadar Upazila of Bangladesh. It is located in the village of Uchail Shankarpasha, Rajiura Union, Habiganj.

== History ==
From engraved inscriptions, it can be found that the mosque was completed in 1513 by Shah Majlis e Amin member of the Majlish of Bengal Sultanat under Sultan Alauddin Husain Shah. It was built on the memory of conquest of Taraf on the very location where the conquest begin by the twelve Saints who came to spread Islam in the region along with Saint Shahjalal (R). His mazar is located next to the mosque. According to Banglapedia, it was built sometime between 1494 and 1499 AD. As years passed, the area became entrapped in dense vegetation and forest land. Recently, this mosque has been discovered again.

== Description ==
It is a one-storey building. The building has the same length and width which is 6.55 metres (21 ft 6 in). The width of the verandah is slightly above 0.91 metres (3 ft) wide. It has four domes; with one large dome on the main building and three smaller domes on the verandah. There are 15 doors and windows, almost equal in size. The thickness of the walls are all approximately 1.5 metres (5 ft), apart from the western wall, which is approximately 3.0 metres (10 ft). It has six decorative pillars in the four corners of the main hall and two corners of the verandah. There is a large pond behind the mosque. The mosque has three doorways, with the middle one much larger than the others. There is a small minaret, that is not attached to the mosque.

== Gallery ==
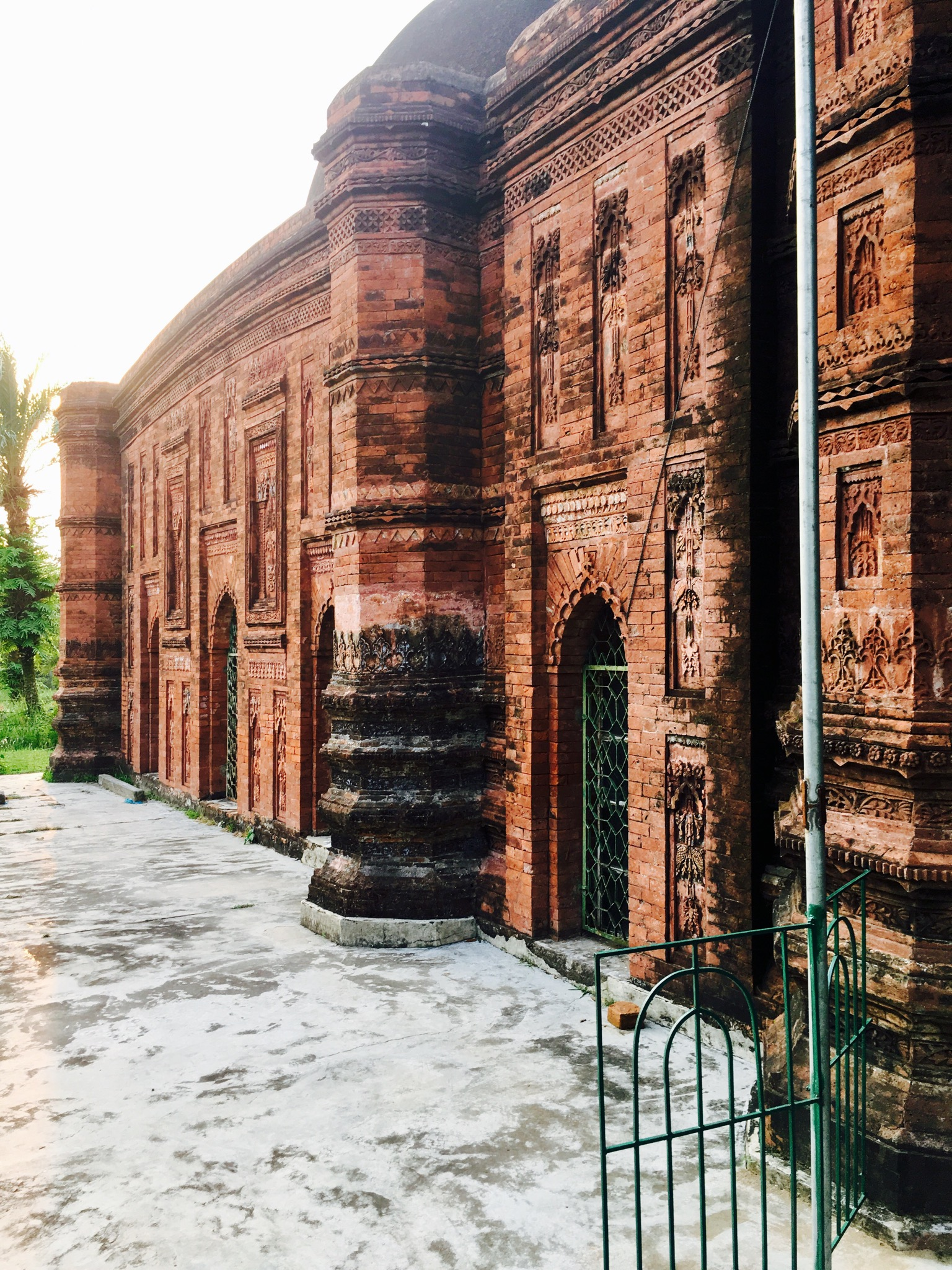
Side view

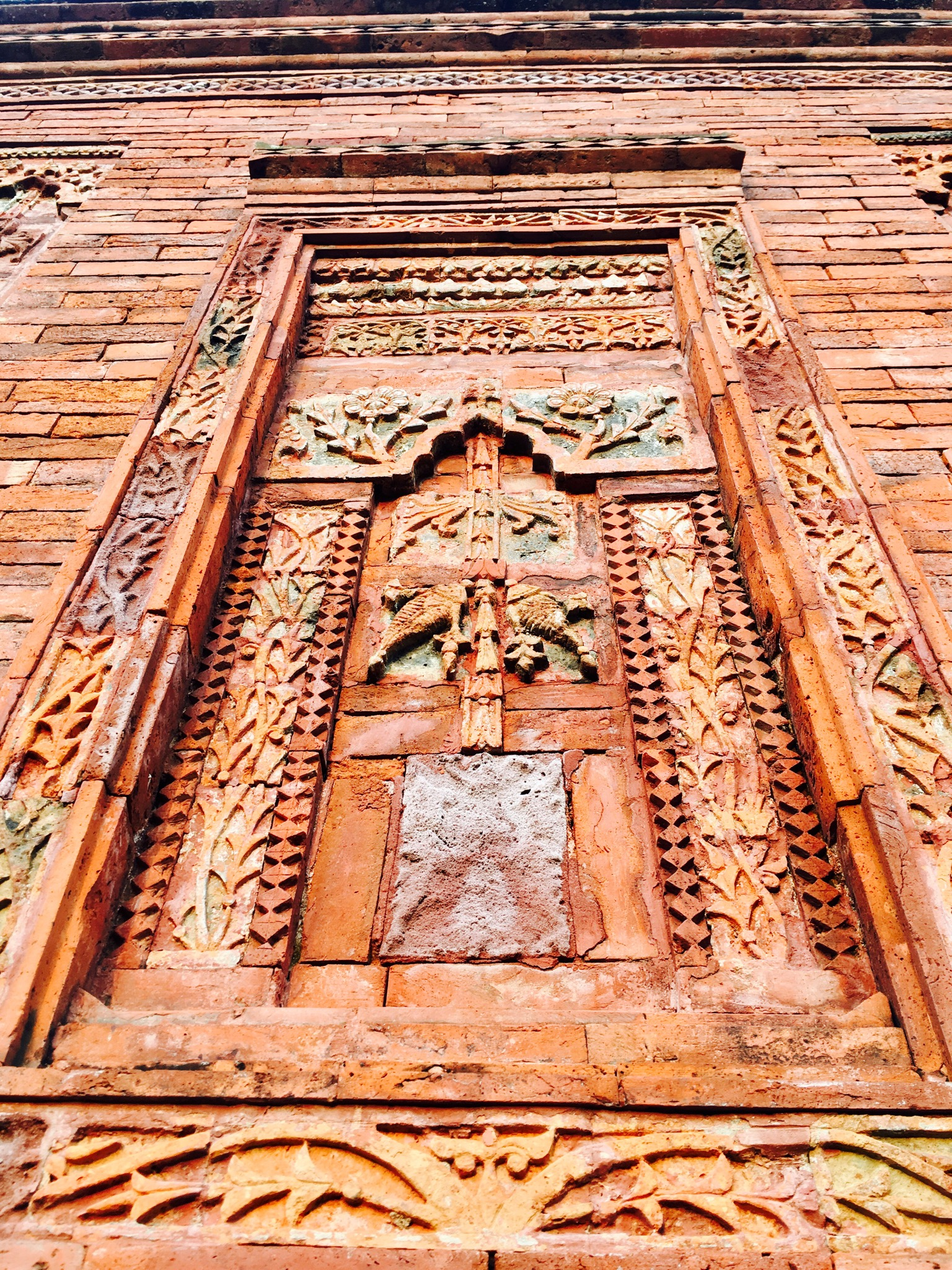
Wall design

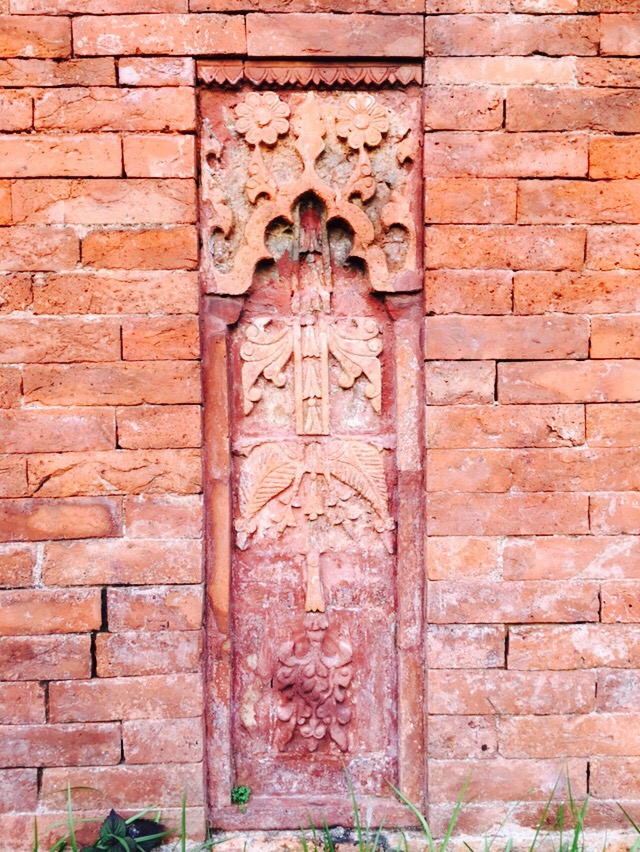
Design

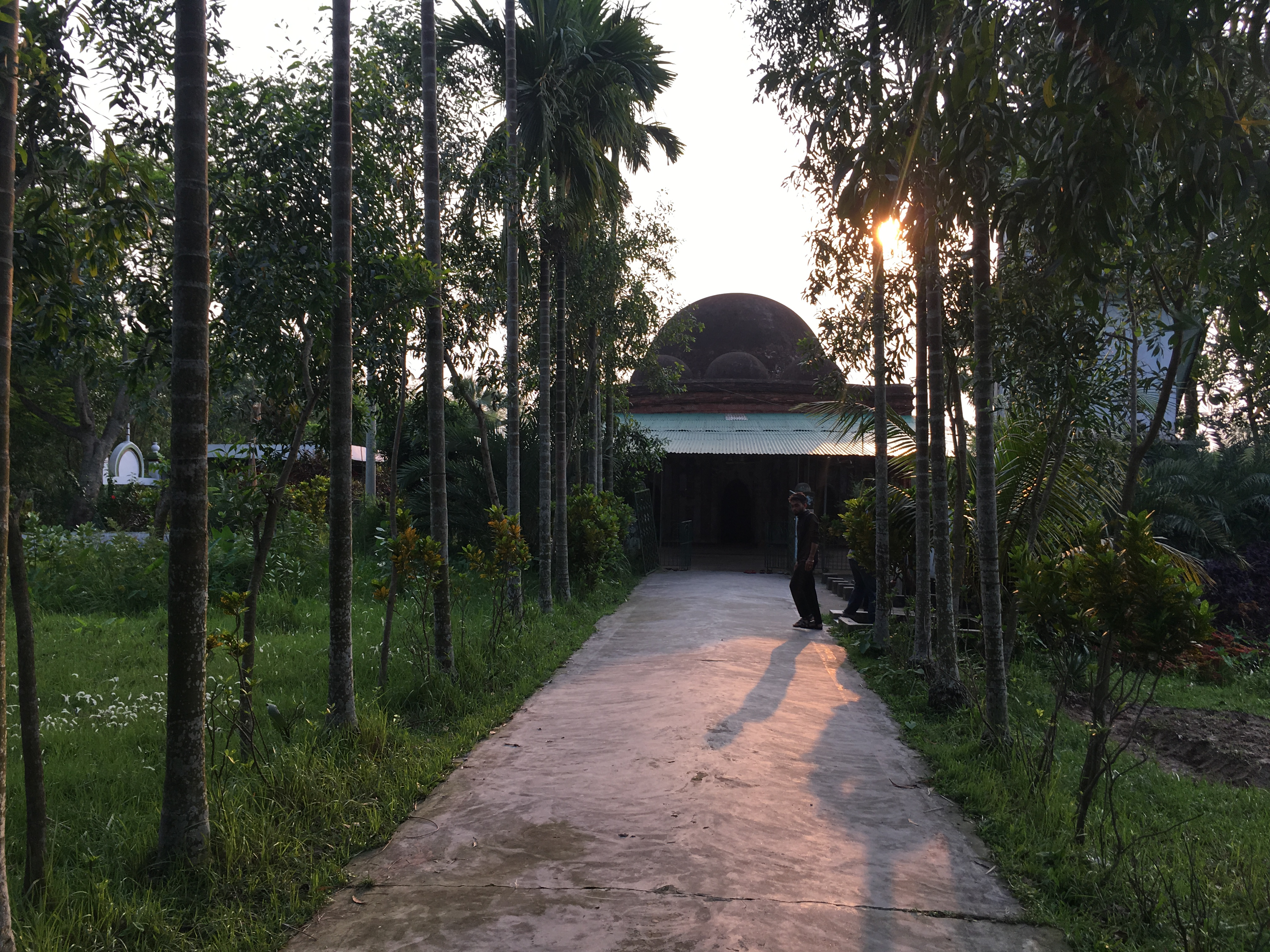
Entrance

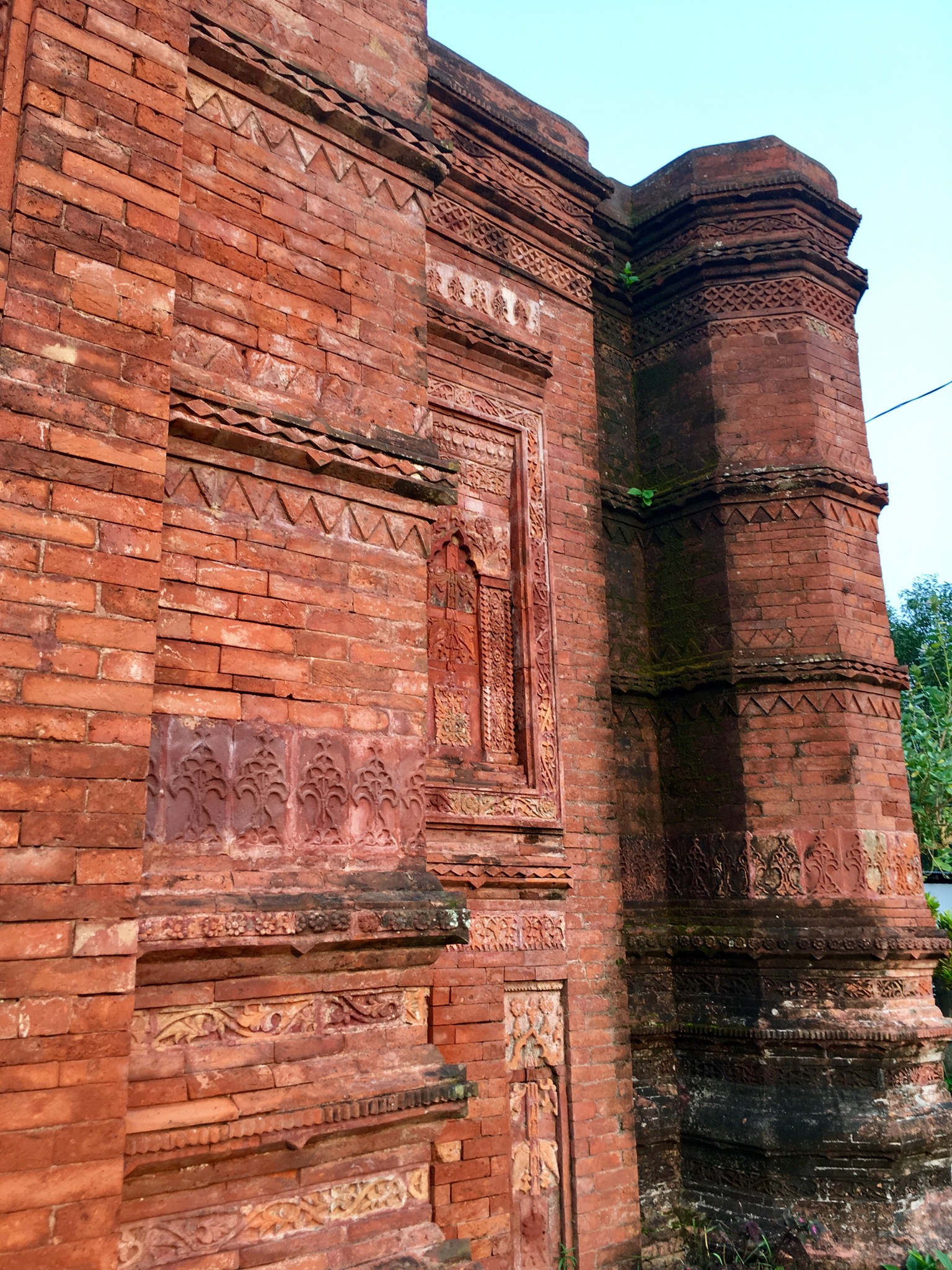
Pillar

== See also ==
- Islam in Bangladesh
- List of mosques in Bangladesh
