= Brindaban Government College =

College in Habiganj, Bangladesh

Brindaban Govt. College, Habiganj
- বৃন্দাবন সরকারি কলেজ, হবিগঞ্জ
- Type: Public college
- Established: 1931; 95 years ago
- Affiliations: National University; Mymensingh Education Board
- Principal: Professor AKM Masudul Haque
- Academic staff: 54
- Students: 14,286
- Undergraduates: 10,678
- Postgraduates: 1,016
- Other students: 2,592
- Location: Habiganj Sadar, 7903, Bangladesh
- Campus: 6.23 acres (2.52 ha); Urban
- Language: Bengali
- Website: bc.gov.bd

Brindaban Govt. College, Habiganj is a government college located in Habiganj District of Bangladesh. It is situated in Rajnagar, at the center of Habiganj Sadar, and was established on 1 July 1931. At present, the college offers education at the Higher Secondary level in Science, Humanities, and Business Studies streams. In addition, undergraduate (Pass) programmes, undergraduate (Honours) programmes in 14 subjects, and postgraduate programmes are conducted. According to 2025 data, a total of 14,286 students are currently enrolled at the college.

== History ==
Brindaban Government College, the second largest and one of the oldest educational institutions in the Sylhet Division, began its academic activities in mid-1931 under the name Habiganj College. Mr. Bipin Bihari Dey, a professor of philosophy from Ripon College, Kolkata, was appointed as the first principal. Although the college was affiliated with the University of Calcutta, it faced severe financial difficulties within a year of its establishment and was on the verge of closure. At that time, a philanthropist businessman, Babu Brindaban Chandra Das of Bithangal village in Baniachong Thana, donated a one-time grant of 10,000 taka. In recognition of his contribution, the governing body renamed the institution Brindaban College.

During the British period, the college initially offered instruction only at the Higher Secondary level in the Humanities stream. In the 1939–40 academic year, the BA (Pass) course was introduced, followed by BA (Honours) courses in several subjects in the 1940–41 academic year. On 7 May 1979, the college was nationalized by the then government and renamed Brindaban Government College. In 1998, the college received re-approval to conduct Honours programmes. At present, the college offers Higher Secondary education in all streams, undergraduate (Pass) courses, and Honours programmes in Bangla, English, Economics, Political Science, Philosophy, History, Islamic History and Culture, Physics, Chemistry, Botany, Zoology, Mathematics, Accounting, and Management. In 2003, postgraduate programmes in Bangla, Political Science, Islamic History and Culture, Accounting, and Management were introduced under the National University.

== Academics ==
More than 4,000 students in Higher Secondary School Certificate (HSC), honors and masters levels are currently studying in this college. The HSC education is controlled by the Board of Intermediate and Secondary Education, Sylhet. Honors and masters subjects are taught according to the guidance of Bangladesh National University.

The college placed within the top ten colleges in Sylhet Division, and it is the top ranked college in Habiganj district according to students performance, in four years between 2007 and 2016.

== Campus ==
Having an area of 6.2 acre, the college campus is adorned with academic buildings, tree orchards, ponds and other infrastructures. There are a number of magnificent buildings in the college. These buildings are as old as the college itself. A library, Shaheed Minar commemorating the martyrs of language movement in 1952, a mosque, and a gymnasium are also in the campus.

== Course Information ==
=== Bachelor Degree (Pass) ===
- B. A. (Pass)
- B. S. S. (Pass)
- B. Sc. (Pass)
- B. B. S. (Pass)
- C.C

=== Bachelor Degree Honours & Masters Final ===
- BENGALI
- ENGLISH
- HISTORY
- ISLAMIC HISTORY AND CULTURE
- PHILOSOPHY
- POLITICAL SCIENCE
- ECONOMICS
- ACCOUNTING
- MANAGEMENT
- PHYSICS
- CHEMISTRY
- BOTANY
- ZOOLOGY
- MATHEMATICS

== Students ==
According to data from the Bangladesh Bureau of Educational Information and Statistics (BANBEIS), in 2025 a total of 14,286 students were enrolled at the college, including 2,592 students at the Higher Secondary level, 4,228 students in undergraduate (Pass) programmes, 6,450 students in undergraduate (Honours) programmes, and 1,016 students in postgraduate programmes.

== Notable alumni ==
- Dasarath Deb Former Chief Minister of Tripura
- Syed Abdal Ahmed, journalist
- Enamul Hoque Mostofa Shaheed Bangladeshi Politician

== See also ==
- Ananda Mohan College
