= Akhaura–Kulaura–Chhatak line =

Railway line in Bangladesh

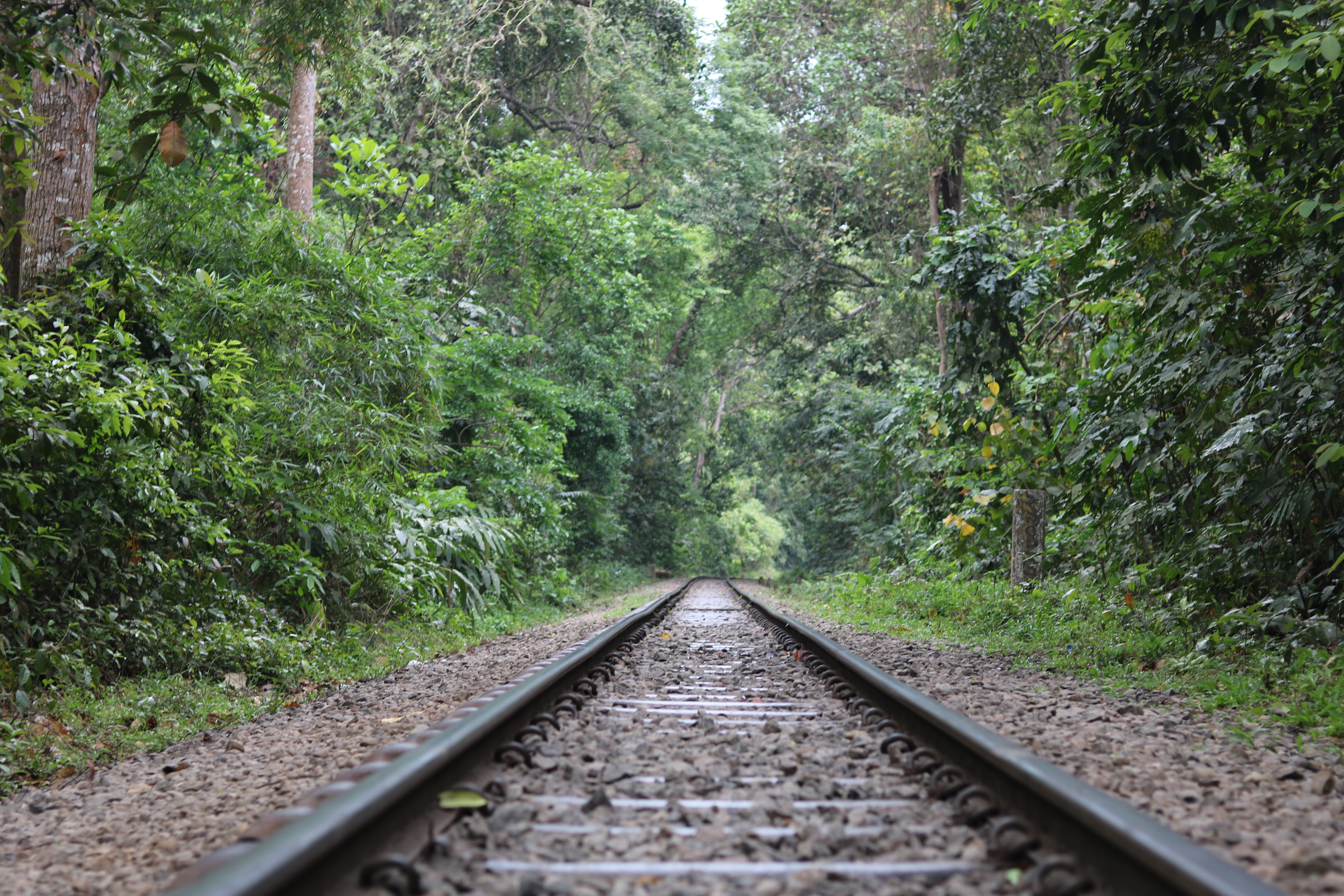
- Lawachara National Park Akhaura–Kulaura–Chhatak Railroad

Overview
- Status: Operational
- Owner: Bangladesh Railway
- Locale: Bangladesh
- Termini: Akhaura; Chhatak
- Stations: Active 38 Inactive 18 Total 56
- Website: www.railway.gov.bd

Service
- Operator(s): Eastern Railway, Bangladesh

History
- Opened: • Akhaura–Kulaura–Shahbajpur: 1896–98, • Kulaura–Sylhet: 1912–15, • Habiganj Bazar–Shaistaganj–Balla: 1928–29, • Sylhet–Chhatak: 1954

Technical
- Num of tracks: 2/ 1 ?
- Track gauge: 1,000 mm (3 ft 3 3/8 in) metre gauge

The Akhaura–Kulaura–Chhatak line is a railway line connecting Akhaura and Chhatak, via Kulaura in Bangladesh. This line is under the jurisdiction of Bangladesh Railway.

== History ==
In response to the demands of the Assam tea planters for a railway link to Chittagong port, Assam Bengal Railway started construction of a railway track on the eastern side of Bengal in 1891. A 150 kilometres (93 mi) track between Chittagong and Comilla was opened to traffic in 1895. The Comilla–Akhaura–Kulaura–Badarpur section was opened in 1896–98 and extended to Lumding by 1903.

The Kulaura-Sylhet section was opened 1912–15, the Shaistaganj-Habiganj branch line in 1928, the Shaistaganj–Balla branch line in 1929 and the Sylhet–Chhatak Bazar line in 1954.

A metre gauge link exists between Shahbajpur in Bangladesh and Mahisasan in India.

== Trains ==
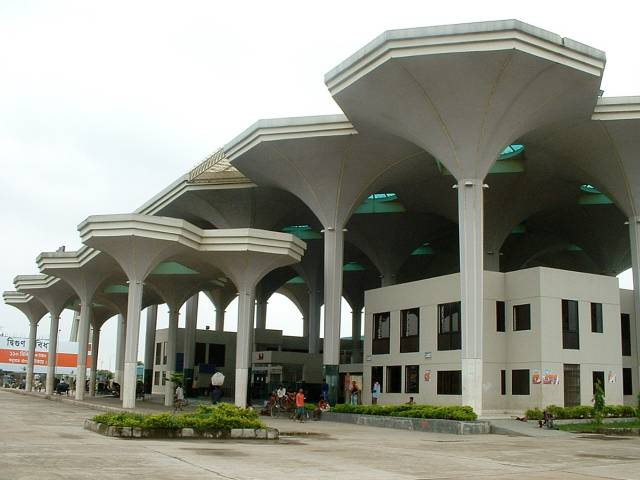
Sylhet railway station

There are several direct trains between Dhaka and Sylhet, such as Parabot, Jointika and Upbon. The one-way journey takes a little over seven hours. There also are trains to Chittagong from Sylhet.

The new railway station at Sylhet was opened in 2004. A.K. Rafique Uddin Ahmed, representing Engineering and Planning Consultants Ltd., was the chief architect of the project.

== Nearby places ==
Madhabkunda waterfall is a 3 km (1.9 mi) rickshaw ride from Dakshinbag railway station. It is also accessible from Sylhet and Srimangal.

Tamabil-Dawki road border-crossing across the Bangladesh–India border is 55 km (34 mi) north of Sylhet.
