= Shayestaganj Upazila =

Coordinates: 24.1644°N 91.2630°E

Shayestaganj শায়েস্তাগঞ্জ
- Upazila
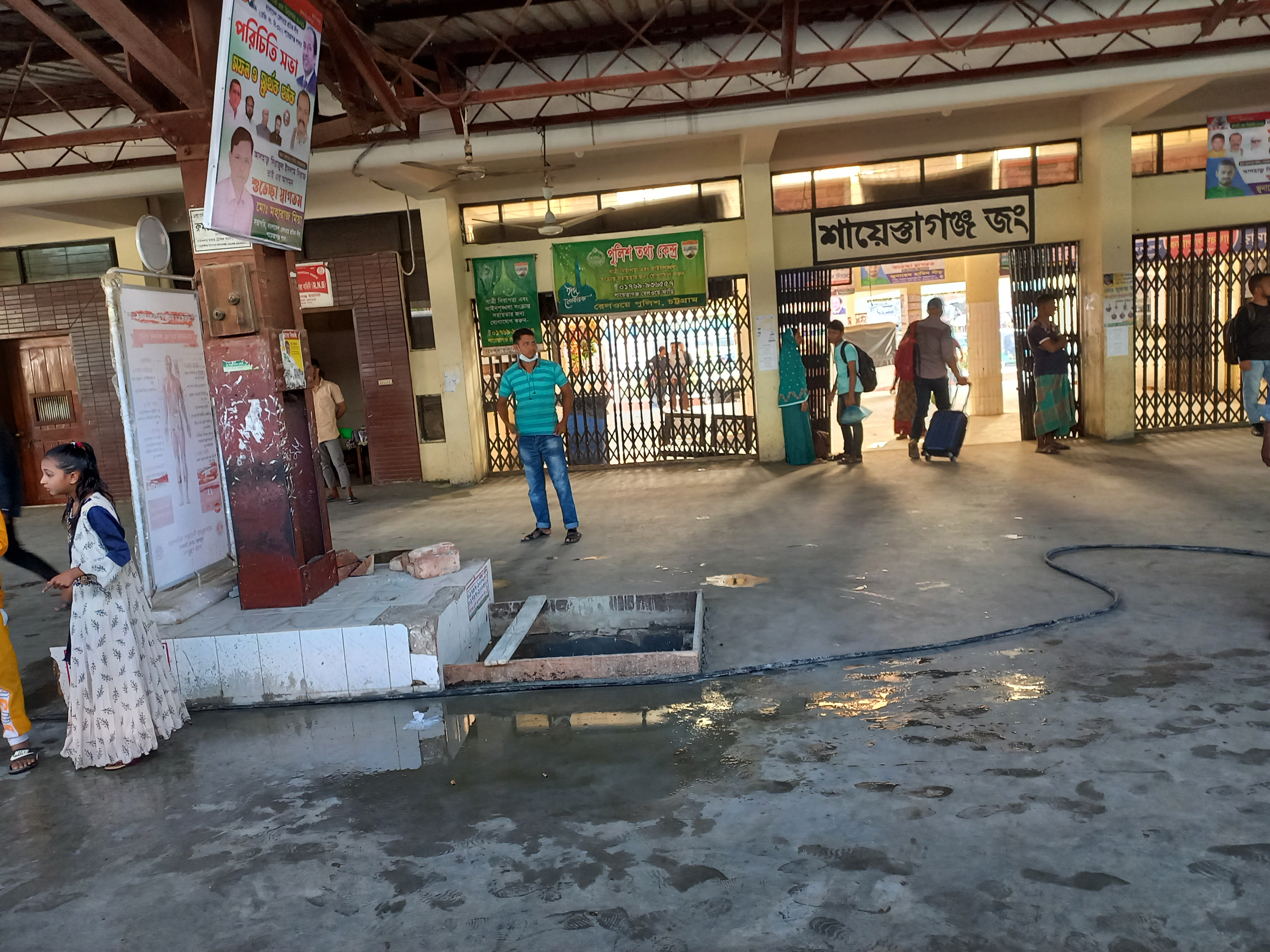
- Shayestaganj Junction

- Country: Bangladesh
- Division: Sylhet
- District: Habiganj
- Upazila: 20 November 2017
- Named for: Syed Shayesta Miah
- Headquarters: Shayestaganj

Government
  - Upazila Chairman: Vacant

Area
  - Upazila: 39.55 km^{2} (15.27 sq mi)
  - Metro: 12.77 km^{2} (4.93 sq mi)

Population (2022)
  - Upazila: 97,408
  - Density: 2,463/km^{2} (6,379/sq mi)
- Demonym(s): Shayestaganji, Shayestaganji
- Time zone: UTC+6 (BST)
- Postal code: 3301
- Area code: 08332
- Website: shayestaganj.habiganj.gov.bd

Shayestaganj (Bengali: শায়েস্তাগঞ্জ), also spelt Shaistaganj, is an upazila (sub-district) of Habiganj District in northeastern Bangladesh, part of the Sylhet Division.

Shayestaganj Railway Junction, Hospital, Market, Township, other offices and important places are located here since long.

== History ==
According to Achyut Charan Choudhury, a bazaar and courthouse was established approximately 300 years ago on the banks of the Khowai River by Syed Shayesta Miah as Shayesta Miah's Bazar and named after himself. The old market of modern-day Shayestaganj is viewed as the original Shayesta Miah's Bazar which eventually grew coming to be known as Shayestaganj. Syed Shayesta was the son of Syed Hamid Raja of Laskarpur Haveli - the ninth descendant of Syed Nasiruddin, a military commander who established the feudal state of Taraf following its capture in 1304. He had no children, and so his wealth and possessions were inherited by his wife following his death. The courthouse was auctioned and eventually purchased by a Babu named Hargovinda Roy. The building became popularly known by the locals as the "auctioned courthouse".

During colonial British rule, a railway junction was founded in Shayestaganj as part of the Assam Bengal Railway project. As a result, Shayestaganj continued to expand and a new market place arose in nearby Dawudnagar. During the Bangladesh Liberation War of 1971, modern-day Shayestaganj was under Sector 3, commanded by K. M. Shafiullah and later A. N. M. Nuruzzaman. The armed Bengali freedom fighters successfully blew up a train by an anti-tank mine near this area. On 1 or 2 May, Ramiz Uddin and others set up a camp near the rail line on the banks of the Khowai River, and gained control of Balumara Forest Office and nearby areas. Abdus Salam and other freedom fighters destroyed the Daragaon Rail Bridge over the Karangi River in eastern Shayestaganj, in the third week of August.

In 1998, Shayestaganj town was designated as a municipality and gained first-class status in 2013. On 20 November 2017, the Shayestaganj Upazila (sub-district) was formed out of southern parts of Habiganj Sadar Upazila, officially becoming Bangladesh's 492nd upazila.

== Demographics ==
Religions in Shayestaganj Upazila (2022)
Religion	Percent
Islam	91.24%
Hinduism	8.61%
Other or not stated	0.15%

According to the 2022 Bangladeshi census, Shayestaganj Upazila had 22,112 households and a population of 97,408. 10.30% of the population were under 5 years of age. Shayestaganj had a literacy rate (age 7 and over) of 78.12%: 80.67% for males and 75.60% for females, and a sex ratio of 99.86 males for every 100 females. 33,259 (34.14%) lived in urban areas.

According to the 2011 Census of Bangladesh, Shayestaganj Upazila had 12,775 households and a population of 65,398. 17,133 (26.20%) were under 10 years of age. Shayestaganj had a literacy rate (age 7 and over) of 54.12%, compared to the national average of 51.8%, and a sex ratio of 1032 females per 1000 males. 23,314 (35.65%) lived in urban areas.

== Administration ==
Shayestaganj Upazila is divided into Shayestaganj Municipality and three union parishads: Brahmandura, Nurpur, and Shayestaganj.

Shayestaganj Municipality is subdivided into 9 wards.

== Education ==
There are many educational institutions in this sub-district. Some notable ones include Jahur Chan Bibi Women's College, Shayestaganj Degree College and the Shayestaganj Kamil Madrasa. The Shayestaganj High School was established in 1918.Shaistaganj Skill Development Institute was established in 01/01/2022

== Notable people ==
- Enamul Haque Mostafa Shahid, politician
