= Mahisasan railway station =

Railway station on India-Bangladesh border

Mahisasan

General information
- Location: Mahisasan, Karimganj district, Assam; India
- Coordinates: 24°49′30″N 92°17′28″E
- System: Indian Railways station

Construction
- Structure type: Standard (on ground station)
- Parking: opened = 1896-98

Other information
- Status: Functioning
- Station code
- Zone(s): Northeast Frontier Railway

History
- Former names: Assam Bengal Railway
Location
- Location within Assam Location within India

Mahisasan is a border railway station and a defunct railway transit facility point on the India–Bangladesh border in Karimganj district in the Indian state of Assam. The corresponding station on the Bangladesh side is Shahbajpur (also known as Latu) in Sylhet District. The border station is linked to Karimganj 11 kilometres (6.8 mi) away. The Mahisasan–Shahbajpur route has not been operational since December 1996 due to lack of traffic.

== History ==
In response to the demand of the Assam tea planters for a railway link to Chittagong port, Assam Bengal Railway started construction of a railway track on the eastern side of Bengal in 1891. A 150 kilometres (93 mi) track between Chittagong and Comilla was opened to traffic in 1895. The Comilla–Akhaura–Kulaura–Badarpur section was opened in 1896–1898 and finally extended to Lumding in 1903. Mahisasan was a station on this track. With the partition of India in 1947, it assumed importance as a border station.

== Broad gauge ==
The Railway Budget for 2011–12 has approved the conversion of the metre-gauge Karimganj-Mahisasan section to broad gauge. Now this a broad-gauge single-track non-electrified line. Currently 2 passenger trains are running in this line from Silchar, Maishashan–Silchar Passenger

=== Metre gauge ===
Earlier it was functioning as a metre-gauge railway station, but after 2015, it was upgraded to BG.

== Trans-Asian Railway ==
Currently, all freight traffic originating from Asia destined for Europe goes by sea. The Trans-Asian Railway will enable containers from Singapore, China, Vietnam, Cambodia, India, Bangladesh, Myanmar, Thailand and Korea to travel over land by train to Europe. The Southern Corridor of the Trans-Asian Railway is of prime interest to India. It connects Yunnan in China and Thailand with Europe via Turkey and passes through India.

There is a general understanding between India and Myanmar that their railways will be interconnected via a 346-km line section that will extend from Kalay in Myanmar to Jiribam in India via the border point at Tamu / Moreh.

The proposed route will enter India through Tamu and Moreh in Manipur bordering Myanmar, then enter Bangladesh through Mahisasan and Shahbajpur and again enter India from Bangladesh at Gede. On the western side, the line will enter Pakistan at Attari. There is a 315-kilometre (196 mi) missing link on this route in the India–Myanmar sector; of this, 180 kilometres (110 mi), in India, is between Jiribam in Manipur and Tamu in Myanmar. The rail link between Jiribam and Imphal has been sanctioned by Indian Railways, but that is unlikely to be completed before 2016. At present construction work is in progress in a 97 kilometres (60 mi) stretch between Jiribam and Tupul.
