= Assam Bengal Railway =

Railway company in British India (1892–1942)

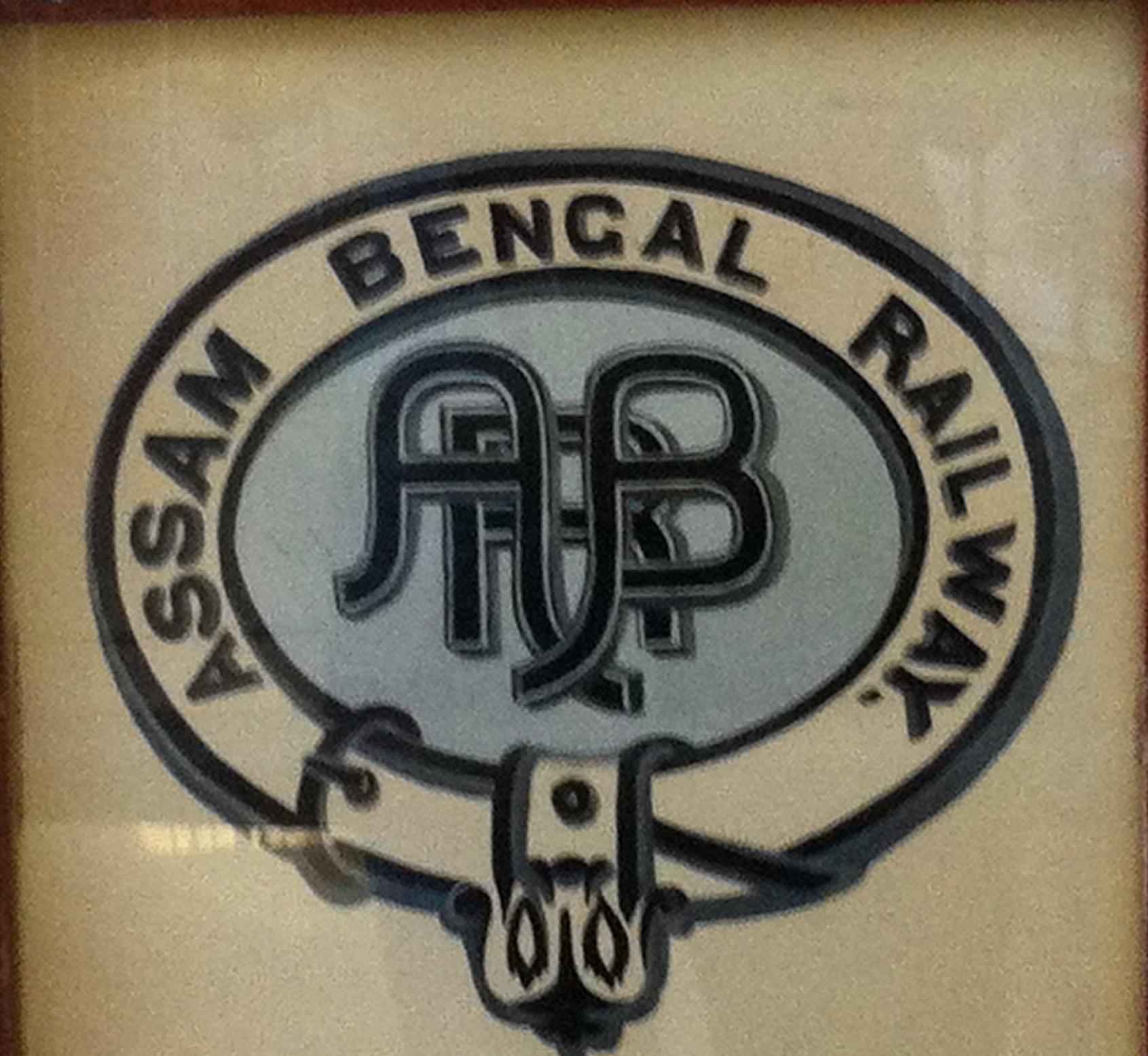
- Industry: Railways
- Founded: 1892
- Defunct: 1942
- Headquarters: Chittagong, British India
- Area served: Assam and Bengal
- Services: Rail transport

The Assam Bengal Railway (ABR) was one of the pioneering railway companies in British India. Headquartered in Chittagong, it functioned from 1892 to 1942.

== History ==
Assam Bengal Railway was incorporated in 1892 to serve British-owned tea plantations in Assam.

Assam Bengal Railway started construction of a railway track on the eastern side of Bengal in 1891. A 150 kilometres (93 mi) track between Chittagong and Comilla was opened to traffic in 1895. The Comilla-Akhaura-Kulaura-Badarpur section was opened in 1896–1898 and finally extended to Lumding in 1903. The Assam Bengal Railway constructed a branch line to Guwahati, connecting the city to the eastern line in 1900. The line was extended to Tinsukia in 1902 and it was also connected to Dibru-Sadiya Railway in 1903.

In 1936, the company owned 205 locomotives, 588 coaches and 5922 goods wagons.

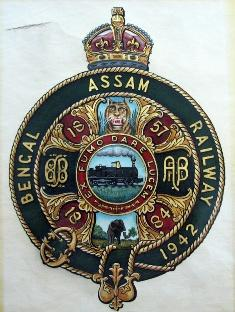
Logo of the Bengal and Assam Railway

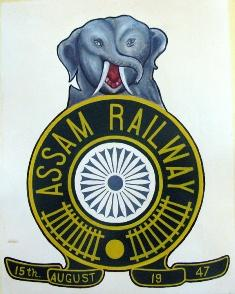
Logo of the Assam Railway

On 1 January 1942, the Assam Bengal Railway combined with the Eastern Bengal Railway to form the Bengal and Assam Railway. At time of the independence of India in 1947, Bengal and Assam Railway was split up and portions of the Bengal Assam Railway which lay in Assam and the Indian part of North Bengal became Assam Railway and East Indian Railway respectively. and the portions about 2,600 km long which fell within the boundary of erstwhile East Pakistan was named as Eastern Bengal Railway, the control remaining with the central Government of Pakistan. Later, with the effect from 1 February 1961, Eastern Bengal Railway was renamed as Pakistan Railway, and in 1962 it became Pakistan Eastern Railway. With the emergence of Bangladesh, it became Bangladesh Railway with its headquarters at Dhaka.

On 14 April 1952, the 2,857 km long Assam Railway and the Oudh and Tirhut Railway were amalgamated to form one of the six newly carved zones of the Indian Railways: the North Eastern Railway (India). On the same day, the reorganized Sealdah division of the erstwhile Bengal Assam Railway (which was added to the East Indian Railway earlier) was amalgamated with the Eastern Railway.

== Classification ==
It was labeled as a Class I railway according to Indian Railway Classification System of 1926.

== Conversion to broad gauge ==
The Indian part of ABR was converted to 1,676 mm (5 ft 6 in) broad gauge in 1990s to 2010s. The Bangladesh part is under conversion to 1,676 mm (5 ft 6 in) broad gauge.
