= Chowdhury =

Title in the Indian subcontinent

- Pronunciation: chow-dhuree; chaw-dree; chow-dree

Origin
- Meaning: "Holder of four"; "four-way duties"; "four responsibilities"
- Region of origin: Indian subcontinent

Other names
- Variant forms: Chaudhary, Chaudri, Choudhary, Chaudhry, Chowdary, Chowdhry, Chowdhary, Chaudry, Choudary, Choudhry, Chaudhuri, Chaudhari, Chudhry, Choudhari, Choudhury, Chowdhuri, Chowduri, Chawdhury, Chaudhurani, Choudhurani, Chowdhurani, Chowdhrani, Choudhrani, Chaudhrani.

Chowdhury, Choudhuri, Chaudhuri, Choudhury, Chaudhri, Chaudhury, Chaudhry, or Chaudhary, is a title of honour, usually hereditary, originating from the Indian subcontinent. It is an adaption from Sanskrit. During the Mughal rule, it was a title awarded to eminent people, while during British rule, the term was associated with zamindars and social leaders. The common female equivalent was Chowdhurani.

== Meaning ==
"Chowdhury" is a term adapted from the Sanskrit words čatus "four-way, all-round" and dhurīya "undertaking a burden", denoting the head of a community or caste.

== Significance ==
It was a title awarded to persons of eminence, including both Muslims and Hindus, during the Mughal Empire. It was also used as a title by military commanders responsible for four separate forces, including the cavalry, navy, infantry and elephant corps. These people belonged to the zamindar families in British India.

Later, the Mughals and the Nawabs conferred the same title in great numbers. Chaudharies were local magnates responsible for land taxes alongside an amil (revenue collector) and a karkun (accountant) in the local-level administrative units known as parganas .

In modern times, the term is a common South Asian surname for both males and females.

In Odisha, "Choudhury" is used as a title by Karanas.

=== Regional ===
In the Chittagong Hill Tracts, the titular Rajas of the Bohmong Circle and Mong Circle have the surname Chowdhury.

The Bengali Muslim Mirashdars (Note: Mirashdar is a term referring to a landowner who pays taxes directly to the government.) living in the former Kachari Kingdom were given titles by the Kachari Raja, which in modern-day acts as a surname for them.

In Bihar, the Pasi are also known as the Chaudhary, a community traditionally connected with toddy tapping.

In Rajasthan, Haryana, Delhi, Uttar Pradesh, Chaudhary surname is widely used by Jat community while some other communities using it are Rajputs, Gurjars, Ahirs, Dalits, etc. This surname is popular in North India and it conveys honour and strength. It is typically used as a prefix before the given name, often represented by the prefix 'Ch' such as Ch. Charan Singh, 5th prime minister of India and Ch. Devi Lal, 6th deputy prime minister of India.

Deshastha Brahmins and Kammas from Andhra Pradesh and Telangana who got this as a title during Qutb Shahis of Golconda and Nizams of Hyderabad also use Chowdhari or Chowdhury as their surnames.

== Alternate spellings ==
Its alternate spellings include Choudry, Chaudhary, Chaudri, Chaudhri, Choudhary, Chaudhry, Chowdary, Chowdhary, Chaudry, Choudary, Choudhry, Chaudhuri, Chaudhari, Chudhry, Choudhari, Choudhury, Chowdhuri, Chowdury and Chawdhury. The female equivalent is Chaudhurani and alternate spellings include Choudhurani, Chowdhurani, Chowdhrani, Choudhrani and Chaudhrani.

== Chowdhury by country ==
=== Bangladesh ===
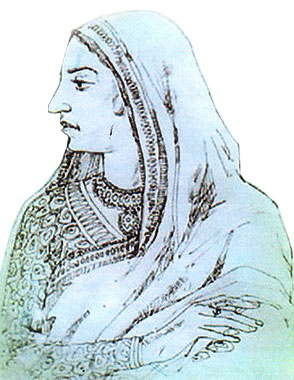
Faizunnesa Choudhurani

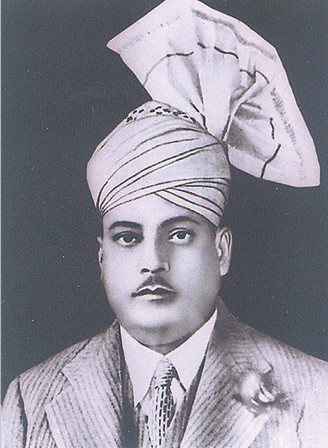
Abdul Hamid Chowdhury

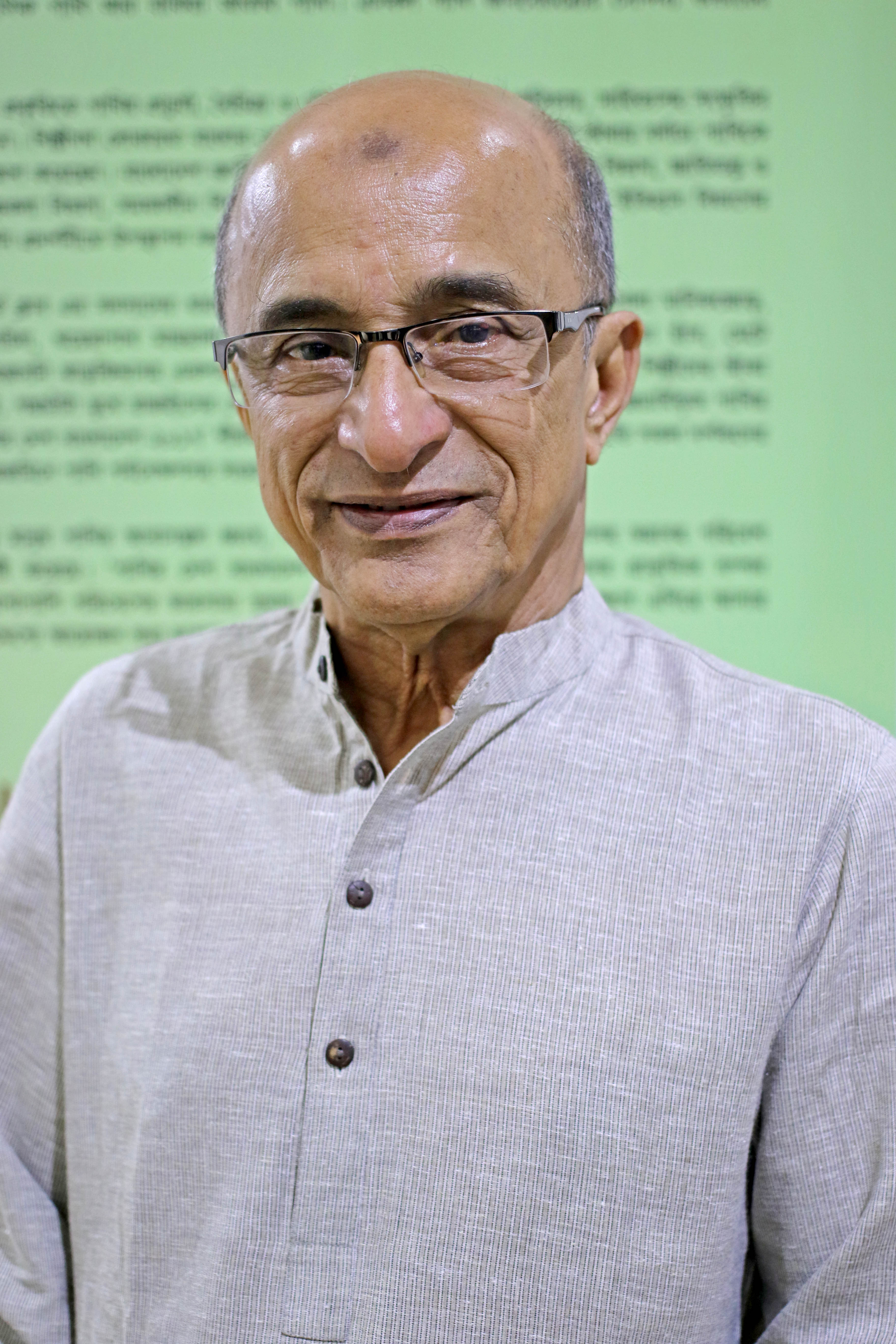
Dr. Tawfiq-e-Elahi Chowdhury

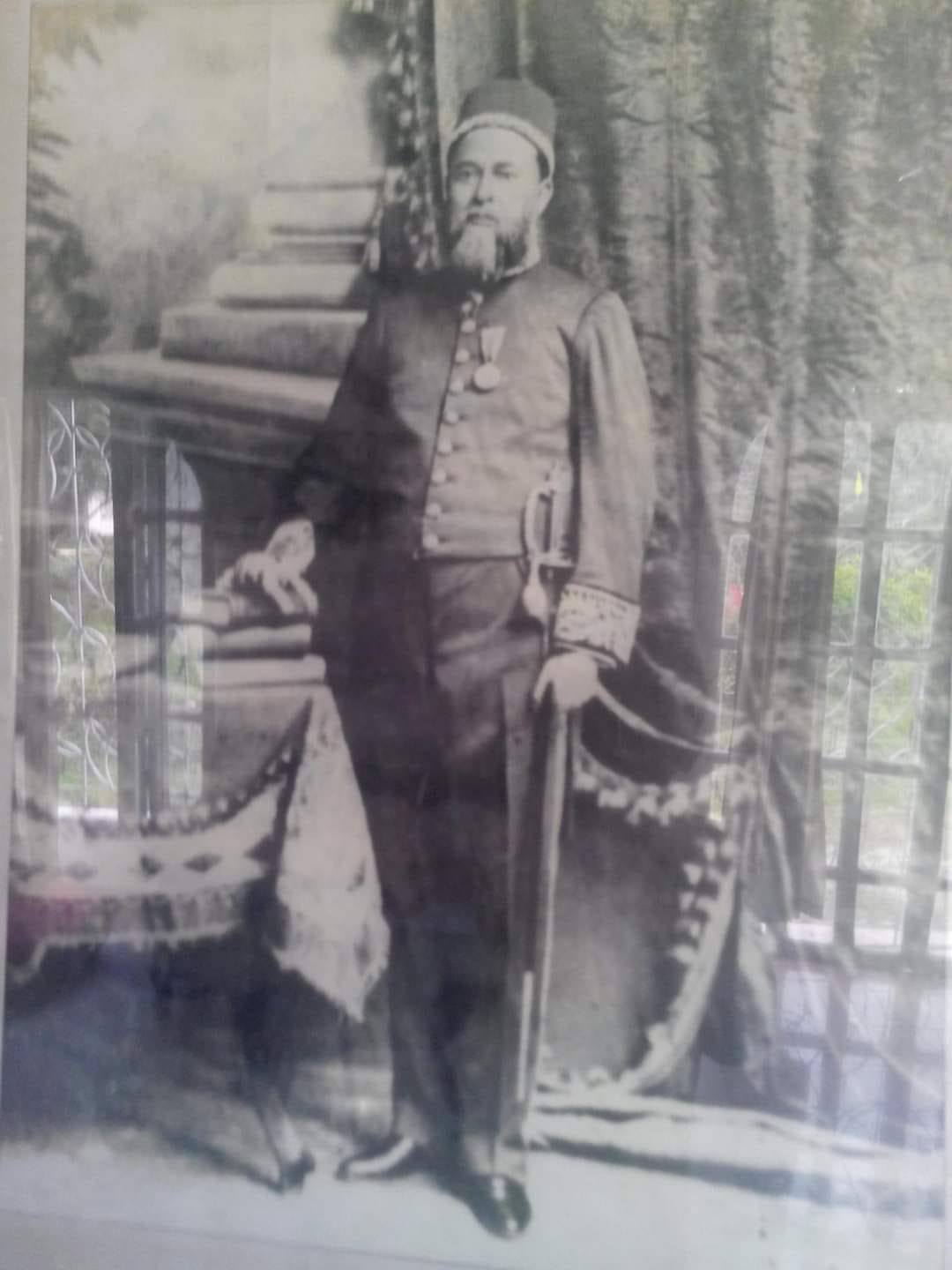
Syed Nawab Ali Chowdhury

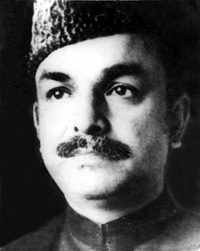
Habibullah Bahar Chowdhury

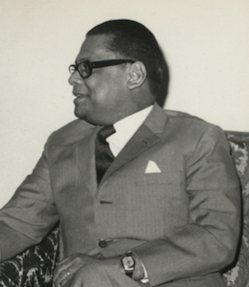
Abu Sayeed Chowdhury

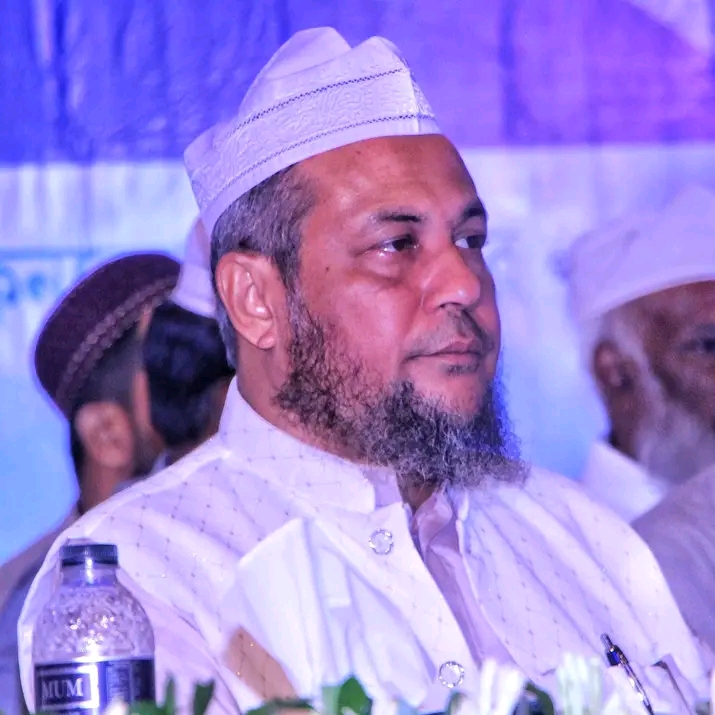
Husam Uddin Chowdhury Fultali

- Justice A. F. M. Ahsanuddin Chowdhury, 9th President of Bangladesh
- A. H. Abdul Gafur Chowdhury, politician
- A. K. M. Rafiq Ullah Choudhury (1923–2011), former chairman of Sandwip Upazila
- A. N. Muhammad Momtaz Uddin Choudhury (1923–2005), first vice-chancellor of Islamic University, Bangladesh
- A. T. Muhammad Nurul Bashar Chowdhury, former chairman of Kutubdia Upazila Council
- Abeda Chowdhury (born 1942), politician
- Abdul Hakeem Chowdhury (1924–1986), president of Sunamganj Awami League
- Abdul Halim Chowdhury (1928–1987), former minister of Agriculture and Food
- Abdul Hye Choudhury, politician
- Abdul Kahir Chowdhury, former parliamentarian
- Abdul Mannan Choudhury (born 1948), vice-chancellor of World University of Bangladesh
- Abdul Mannan Chowdhury, politician
- Abdul Matin Chaudhary (1895–1948), minister and politician
- Abdul Matin Chowdhury (1921–1981), academic and physicist
- Abdul Matin Chowdhury (1944–2012), politician
- Abdul Matin Chowdhury Shaikh-e-Fulbari (1915–1990), religious scholar and political activist
- Abdul Momin Chowdhury (1947–2024), historian and academic administrator, president of the Asiatic Society of Bangladesh (2000–2003)
- Abdul Munim Chowdhury (born 1967), former MP for Habiganj-1
- Abdur Rab Chowdhury (1934–2018), secretary for the Ministry of Agriculture
- Abdur Rouf Choudhury (1929–1996), writer
- Abdur Rouf Chowdhury (1935–2014), politician
- Abdus Salam Chowdhury, former parliamentarian
- Abdus Sattar Chowdhury, politician
- Abidur Reza Chowdhury (1872–1961), educationist and politician
- Abu Lais Muhammad Mubin Chowdhury (1973–2013), former MP for Habiganj-3
- Abu Naser Chowdhury, politician
- Abu Osman Chowdhury (1936–2020), Sector Commander of the Mukti Bahini
- Abul Fayez Muhammad Abdul Alim Chowdhury (1928–1971), martyred ophthalmologist
- Abul Hasnat Chowdhury, politician
- Abul Kalam Azad Chowdhury (born 1946), 23rd vice-chancellor of the University of Dhaka and 11th chairman of the University Grants Commission
- Abul Kalam Muhammad Ahsanul Hoque Chowdhury (born 1968), member of parliament
- Abul Khair Chowdhury, former State Minister of Youth and Sports
- Akram Hossain Chowdhury, politician
- Alauddin Ahmed Chowdhury (born 1961), MP for Feni-1
- Altaf Hossain Chowdhury (born 1942), former Air Force chief
- Altaf Hossain Chowdhury, politician
- Altafur Rahman Chowdhury (1926–2018), member of Awami League
- Aminul Islam Chowdhury (born 1921), founding chairman of Chittagong Chamber of Commerce & Industry
- Amirul Islam Chowdhury (born 1942), 7th vice-chancellor of Jahangirnagar University and former president of Asiatic Society of Bangladesh
- Anisul Haque Chowdhury (1926–2011), politician
- Anisul Haque Chowdhury Rizu, politician
- Anwar Hossain Chowdhury, retired brigadier general
- Anwarul Kabir Chowdhury, former parliamentarian
- Anwarul Karim Chowdhury (born 1943), former UN Under Secretary General
- Ariful Haque Choudhury (born 1959), former mayor of Sylhet
- Ayesha Bedora Choudhury (1935–1971), doctor
- Azizul Haque Choudhury, politician
- Azizur Rahman Chowdhury (1946–2011), Islamic scholar and politician
- Chanchal Chowdhury (born 1971), actor
- Chowdhury Abdul Hai, advocate and politician
- Chowdhury Abdullah Al-Mamun (born 1964), 29th Inspector General of Bangladesh Police
- Chowdhury Abu Torab Khan (died 1767), nobleman
- Chowdhury Gulam Akbar, writer and collector of Bengali folk literature for the Bangla Academy
- Chowdhury Harunur Rashid (died 2000), founding president of Bangladesh Trade Union Centre
- Chowdhury Khurshid Alam, politician
- Chowdhury Motahar Hossain, politician
- Dewan Shahjahan Eaar Chowdhury, politician
- Didarul Alam Chowdhury, first chairman of Ramu Upazila Council
- Ebadur Rahman Chowdhury, former State Minister of Food
- Ekramul Karim Chowdhury (born 1962), secretary-general of Noakhali Awami League
- Enam Ahmed Chowdhury (1937–2025), civil servant
- Enamul Haque Chowdhury (1948–2011), politician
- Erfan Reza Choudhury, former MNA
- Farid Uddin Chowdhury (born 1947), teacher, politician and businessman
- Gias Uddin Chowdhury, politician
- Golam Ali Chowdhury, Zamindar of Haturia and philanthropist
- Golam Jilani Chowdhury, former chairman of Sunamganj District Council
- A.K. Golam Jilani Chowdhury (1904–1932), independence revolutionary
- Golam Mabud Chowdhury (born 1984), Sylhet Division cricketer
- Golam Mohiuddin Chowdhury, retired major general
- Golam Wahed Choudhury (1926–1997), Bangladeshi diplomat and political scientist
- Gulzar Ahmed Chowdhury (1937–2019), politician
- Hamidul Huq Choudhury (1901–1992), former Minister of Foreign Affairs
- Hamza Choudhury, English-born footballer
- Harris Chowdhury, former MP for Sylhet-5
- Hasan Mashhud Chowdhury, 11th Chief of Army Staff of the Bangladesh Army
- Hasina Bari Chowdhury (born 1964), former MP
- Humayun Kabir Chowdhury, former chairman of Patnitala Upazila Council
- Iftekhar Ahmed Chowdhury, diplomat and former Foreign Affairs Adviser
- Iqbal Hossain Chowdhury (1944–2001), former Minister of Food
- Iqbal Sobhan Chowdhury (born 1949), editor of The Daily Observer and media adviser to the Prime Minister
- Ismat Ahmed Chowdhury, politician
- Izharul Islam Chowdhury, Bangladeshi Islamic scholar
- Jafrul Islam Chowdhury (1950–2022), former State Minister of Environment and Forest
- Jahangir Alam Chowdhury (born 1953), 7th Principal Staff Officer of Armed Forces
- Jahed Ali Chowdhury (1947–2011), former president of Mohammedan SC
- Jamilur Reza Choudhury, president of Bangladesh Mathematical Olympiad, vice-chancellor of University of Asia Pacific, adviser to Caretaker Government of Bangladesh
- Kamran Hossain Chowdhury (1952–2024), politician
- Kamrun Nahar Chowdhury, parliamentarian
- Khalilur Rahman Chowdhury (died 2013), politician
- Khan Fazle Rub Chowdhury, former MNA
- Khosru Chowdhury (born 1973), politician
- Lutfar Rahman Chowdhury, former parliamentarian
- M. K. Alam Chowdhury, politician
- Mafiz Ali Chowdhury (1919–1994), former Minister of Natural Wealth, Science and Technology Research and Atomic Energy
- Mahbub Kabir Chowdhury, politician
- Mahmudul Islam Chowdhury (born 1950), former mayor of Chittagong
- Mahmudul Karim Chowdhury (1938–2005), president of Bangladesh Fisherman's Society
- Mahmud Us Samad Chowdhury, former MP for Sylhet-3
- Majibul Haque Chowdhury, former parliamentarian
- Majibur Rahman Chowdhury, former MNA
- Masud Uddin Chowdhury (born 1954), 8th Principal Staff Officer of Armed Forces
- Matia Chowdhury (born 1942), former Minister of Agriculture
- Matiar Rahman Chowdhury, politician
- Mazhar Ali Chowdhury (born 1970), actor
- Mazharul Haq Shah Chowdhury, former vice-chairman of Jatiya Party
- Mehazabien Chowdhury, actress
- Mifta Uddin Chowdhury Rumi, former High Court justice
- Miftah Uddin Choudhury (born 1955), former High Court judge
- Mina Zaman Chowdhury Jatiya Party (Ershad) politician and the former Member of Bangladesh Parliament
- Mizanur Rahman Chowdhury (1928–2006), fifth Prime Minister of Bangladesh
- Mizanur Rahman Chowdhury (died 2013), leader of Mujib Bahini Jaldhaka branch
- Moazzem Ahmed Chowdhury, former MNA
- Mofazzal Hossain Chowdhury (born 1948), former Minister of Shipping
- Mohammad Abdul Jalil Choudhury (1942–1989), co-founder of Jatiya Samajtantrik Dal
- Mokhlechhar Rahman Chowdhury, politician
- Monirul Haq Chowdhury (born 1946), advisor to BNP Chairman
- Monowar Hossain Chowdhury (born 1948), former chief engineer of LGED
- Mostaq Ahmad Chowdhury, former administrator and chairman of Cox's Bazar District Council
- Motaherul Islam Chowdhury, politician and freedom fighter
- Muhammad Yunus Chowdhury (1906–1992), Islamic scholar and founding president of Befaqul Madarisil Arabia
- Mukhlesur Rahman Chowdhury (born 1965), journalist and former advisor to the President
- Mustafizur Rahaman Chowdhury (born 1957), politician
- Muzaffar Rahman Chowdhury, former MNA
- Naiyyum Choudhury, biotechnologist and nuclear scientist
- Najma Chowdhury, founder of the Women and Gender Studies department in the University of Dhaka, adviser to Caretaker Government of Bangladesh
- Nasimul Alam Chowdhury (born 1967), former parliamentarian
- Nasir Uddin Chowdhury, politician
- Nasiruddin Chowdhury (born 1979), footballer
- Navila Chowdhury, politician
- Nazim Kamran Choudhury, former MP
- Nazir Hossain Chowdhury, politician
- Nazrul Islam Chowdhury (born 1952), parliamentarian
- Nazrul Islam Chowdhury, a judge of the High Court Division
- Nilufar Chowdhury Moni (born 1969), Secretary of BNP Central Committee
- Nitai Roy Chowdhury (born 1949), former State Minister of Education
- Noor-E-Hasna Lily Chowdhury, politician
- Nur Qutb Alam Chowdhury, lawyer and politician
- Nuruddin Chowdhury Noyon (born 1962), two-time parliamentarian
- Nurul Alam Chowdhury (1945–2019), former ambassador to Oman and director of Rupali Bank
- Nural Hoda Choudhury, former MNA
- Nurul Islam Chowdhury (1925–1995), politician
- Nurunnabi Chowdhury (born 1968), politician
- Obaidul Muktadir Chowdhury (born 1955), incumbent Minister of Housing and Public Works
- Omor Faruk Chowdhury (born 1960), former State Minister of Industries
- Rafiqul Bari Chowdhury (1930–2005), cinematographer and director
- Rafiqul Islam Chowdhury (died 2008), 9th vice-chancellor of the University of Chittagong
- Rahimullah Choudhury, former MNA
- Rashed Chowdhury, former Army officer, currently in exile in the United States
- Razzaqul Haider Chowdhury (1889–1970), former minister
- Reazul Huq Chowdhury, politician
- Rezaul Haque Chowdhury (born 1954), two-time MP
- Rezaul Karim Chowdhury (born 1953), incumbent Mayor of Chittagong
- Rezwana Chowdhury, renowned exponent of Tagore songs
- Rezzakul Haider Chowdhury, 14th Director General of Bangladesh Rifles
- Saber Hossain Chowdhury (born 1961), former president of Bangladesh Cricket Board
- Sadruddin Ahmed Chowdhury, physicist and vice-chancellor of Shahjalal University of Science and Technology and Sylhet International University
- Saifuzzaman Chowdhury Jewel, former president of Faridpur Sramik League
- Salah Uddin Shoaib Choudhury, editor of Weekly Blitz
- Salek Chowdhury, physician and politician
- Chowdhury Muhammad Shahriar Emon, actor better known as Salman Shah
- Samarjit Roy Chowdhury, painter
- SBM Mizanur Rahman Chowdhury (died 1971), civil servant and freedom fighter
- Serajul Islam Choudhury (born 1936), literary critic and essayist
- Serajunnessa Choudhury (1910–1974), politician and businesswoman
- Shafi Ahmed Chowdhury, businessman and politician
- Shafiul Alam Chowdhury Nadel MP (born 1969), member of Bangladesh Parliament for Moulvibazar-2, politician, organising secretary of Bangladesh Awami League and director of Bangladesh Cricket Board
- Shahadat Hossain Chowdhury (born 1959), election commissioner and retired brigadier general
- Shahadat Hossain Chowdhury (died 2021), politician
- Shahdab Akbar Chowdhury Labu, politician
- Shahdeen Malik Chowdhury, lawyer
- Shah-e-Jahan Chowdhury, politician
- Shahjahan Chowdhury, president of Cox's Bazar BNP branch
- Shahjahan Chowdhury, film director and scriptwriter
- Shajahan Chowdhury, vice-president of Jamaat-e-Islami Chittagong
- Shah Newaz Chowdhury (died 1997), politician
- Shah Rafiqul Bari Chowdhury, former parliamentarian
- Shah Sirajul Islam Chowdhury, politician
- Shahiduddin Chowdhury Annie (born 1968), vice-chairman of APPG
- Shahinur Pasha Chowdhury (born 1985), vice-president of Jamiat Ulema-e-Islam Bangladesh
- Shamima K Choudhury, physicist and advocate for women in science
- Shamsher M. Chowdhury, diplomat and former secretary of the Ministry of Foreign Affairs
- Shamsuddin Ahmad Chowdhury, physician and politician
- Shamsul Haque Chowdhury (1936–2008), politician
- Shamsul Haque Chowdhury (born 1957), general secretary of Chittagong Abahani Limited
- Shamsul Huda Chaudhury (1920–2000), third Speaker of the Bangladesh National Parliament
- Shankar Gobind Chowdhury (1926–1995), former governor of Natore
- Shawkat Chowdhury (born 1963), politician
- Shirin Sharmin Chaudhury (born 1966), Speaker of the Bangladesh National Parliament
- Shayan Chowdhury, Bengali indie musician and singer
- Shegufta Bakht Chaudhuri, 4th Governor of Bangladesh Bank
- Sirajul Islam Chowdhury, advisor to Jatiya Party chairman
- Sultan Ahmed Chowdhury (1932–1992), deputy speaker of parliament
- Sultana Zaman Chowdhury, politician
- Sultanul Kabir Chowdhury (1946–2014), politician
- Syed Maskarul Alam Chowdhury, former parliamentarian
- Tajul Islam Choudhury (1944–2018), former Opposition Chief Whip
- Tapan Chowdhury, Bengali singer of Adhunik songs
- Tawfiq-e-Elahi Chowdhury (born 1945), energy adviser to the Prime Minister
- T. I. M. Fazle Rabbi Chowdhury (1934–2018), six-time MP and former leader of the Jatiya Party (Zafar)
- Upendrakishore Ray Chowdhury (1863–1915), writer, painter and aristocrat
- Yahya Chowdhury (born 1964), secretary of Jatiya Party Central Committee
- Yakub Ali Chowdhury, former VP of Patuakhali Government College
- Yeamin Ahmed Chowdhury Munna, footballer for Chittagong Abahani
- Yusuf Hossain Choudhury, politician
- Zafrullah Chowdhury (1941–2023), founder of Gonoshasthaya Kendra
- Zakaria Khan Chowdhury (1933–2021), former parliamentarian
- Zulfiqar Mortuza Chowdhury, politician
- Chowdhury family of Aruakandi, Gopalganj
  - Samson Hossain Chowdhury (1925–2012), chairman of Square Pharmaceuticals
  - Tapan Chowdhury, businessman and adviser to the caretaker government
  - Anjan Chowdhury (born 1954), industrialist
- Chowdhury family of Balia, Thakurgaon
  - Nurul Huq Choudhury (1902–1987), parliamentary secretary
  - Rezwanul Haque Idu Chowdhury (1930–1994), former Minister of Social Welfare
- Chowdhury family of Batgram, Comilla
  - Ashrafuddin Ahmad Chowdhury (1894–1976), former Education Minister
  - Rabeya Chowdhury, president of Comilla BNP branch
- Chowdhury family of Bahubal, Habiganj
  - Manik Chowdhury (1933–1991), former governor of Habiganj Subdivision
  - Amatul Kibria Keya Chowdhury, politician
- Chowdhury family of Khanpur, Gopalganj
  - Mohabbat Jan Chowdhury, former Home Minister
  - Sarwar Jan Chowdhury, politician
- Chowdhury family of Baliadi, Gazipur
  - Chowdhury Kazemuddin Ahmed Siddiky (1876–1937), former president of the Eastern Bengal and Assam Muslim League and co-founder of Dhaka University
  - Badruddin Ahmed Siddiky (1915–1991), former Chief Justice of East Pakistan
  - Chowdhury Abraruddin Ahmed Siddiky, leader of the East Bengal Film Association
  - Chowdhury Tanbir Ahmed Siddiky (born 1939), former Minister of Commerce
- Chowdhury family of Dargapasha, Sunamganj
  - Abdur Rasheed Choudhury (died 1944), businessman and politician
  - Humayun Rashid Choudhury (1928–2001), 41st President of the United Nations General Assembly
  - Faruk Rashid Chowdhury, former State Minister of Finance
- Chowdhury family of Dhampur, Mymensingh
  - Aftab Uddin Chowdhury (1913–1985), founding secretary of Bhaluka Pilot High School
  - Aman Ullah Chowdhury (died 2014), politician
- Chowdhury family of Dhanbari, Tangail
  - Syed Nawab Ali Chowdhury (1863–1929), former Minister for Education
  - Syed Mohammad Ali Chowdhury (1909–1963), former Prime Minister of Pakistan
  - Syed Hasan Ali Chowdhury (1910–1981), former Minister for Commerce and Industry
- Chowdhury family of Dhantala, Dinajpur
  - Abdur Rauf Chowdhury (1937–2007), former State Minister for Post and Telecommunications
  - Khalid Mahmud Chowdhury (born 1970), State Minister of Shipping
- Chowdhury family of Duttapara, Madaripur
  - Ilias Ahmed Chowdhury (1934–1991), politician
  - Noor-E-Alam Chowdhury Liton (born 1964), Chief Whip of the Bangladesh Parliament
  - Mujibur Rahman Chowdhury Nixon (born 1978), presidium member of Jubo League
- Chowdhury family of Faridpur
  - Chowdhury Moyezuddin Biwshash (1840–1923), merchant and aristocrat
  - Chowdhury Abd-Allah Zaheeruddin (1903–1967), former Minister of Health, Labor and Social welfare
  - Yusuf Ali Chowdhury (1905–1971), former Minister of Agriculture
  - Chowdhury Kamal Ibne Yusuf (1940–2020), former Minister of Disaster Management
  - Chowdhury Akmal Ibne Yusuf (1945–2021), politician
- Chowdhury family of Fultali, Sylhet
  - Abdul Latif Chowdhury Fultali (1913–2008), Islamic scholar, author, poet and orator
  - Husam Uddin Chowdhury Fultali (born 1974), Islamic scholar, writer and politician
- Chaudhry family of Gahira, Chittagong
  - AKM Fazlul Kabir Chowdhury (1917–1972), Leader of the Opposition at the East Bengal Legislative Assembly
  - Fazlul Qadir Chaudhry (1919–1973), 5th Speaker of the National Assembly of Pakistan
  - A. B. M. Mohiuddin Chowdhury (1944–2017), three-time Mayor of Chittagong
  - Salahuddin Quader Chowdhury (1949–2015), six-time MP and former adviser to the Prime Minister
  - A.B.M. Fazle Karim Chowdhury (born 1954), five-time MP
  - Giasuddin Quader Chowdhury, two-time MP
  - Mohibul Hasan Chowdhury (born 1983), Deputy Minister of Education
- Chowdhury family of Gomnati, Nilphamari
  - Muhammad Rafiqul Islam Chowdhury, 8th vice-chancellor of Islamic University Bangladesh
  - Muhammad Shahrin Islam Chowdhury Tuhin, president of Nilphamari BNP
- Chowdhury family of Guthuma, Feni
  - Habibullah Bahar Chowdhury (1906–1966), former Health Minister
  - Begum Shamsunnahar Chowdhurani (1908–1964), writer, educator and politician
  - Parveen Sultana Chaudhury (1940–2004), writer and academician
  - Iqbal Bahar Chowdhury (born 1940), news presenter and elocutionist
- Chowdhury family of Haildhar, Chittagong
  - Akhtaruzzaman Chowdhury Babu (1945–2012), founding chairman of United Commercial Bank PLC
  - Saifuzzaman Chowdhury (born 1969), Minister of Land
  - Abdul Muntaquim Chaudhury (born 1929), politician
- Chowdhury family of Katakhali, Rajbari
  - Abdul Wajed Chowdhury (died 1992), politician
  - Salma Chowdhury (born 1971), parliamentarian
- Chowdhury family of Kattali (North), Chittagong
  - Mahmudunnabi Chowdhury (1908–1995), former Minister of Relief and Rehabilitation
  - Zahur Ahmad Chowdhury (1919–1974), former Minister of Health and Family Welfare
  - Amir Khasru Mahmud Chowdhury (born 1949), former Minister of Commerce
- Chowdhury family of Lakshmansri, Sunamganj
  - Dewan Hason Raja Chowdhury (1854–1922), mystic poet
  - Dewan Taimur Raja Chowdhury (1917–1997), former State Minister of Communications
- Chowdhury family of Maguradangi, Rajbari
  - Rowshan Ali Chowdhury (1874–1933), journalist
  - Yakub Ali Chowdhury (1888–1940), essayist
- Chowdhury family of Mahipur
  - Khan Bahadur Abdul Majid Chowdhury (1860–1912), educationist
- Chowdhury family of Majidpur-Daihata, Munshiganj
  - Kafiluddin Chowdhury (1898–1972), former Communications and Law Minister of East Pakistan
  - Abul Qasim Mohammad Badruddoza Chowdhury (born 1932), 13th President of Bangladesh
  - Mahi Badruddoza Chowdhury (born 1970), secretary general of Bikalpa Dhara
- Chowdhury family of Mandalpara, Cox's Bazar
  - Osman Sarwar Alam Chowdhury (1937–2010), former ambassador to the UAE
  - Shaimum Sarwar Chowdhury Kamal (born 1970), politician
- Chowdhury family of Monakosha, Nawabganj
  - Murtaza Raza Choudhry, former State Minister for Finance
  - Mainur Reza Chowdhury (1938–2004), 12th Chief Justice of Bangladesh
  - Zara Jabeen Chowdhurani (born 1976), former MP
- Chowdhury family of Nagbari, Tangail
  - Abdul Hamid Chowdhury (died 1969), Speaker of the East Pakistan Provincial Assembly
  - Abu Sayeed Chowdhury (1921–1987), second President of Bangladesh
  - Abul Hasan Chowdhury (born 1951), former State Minister of Foreign Affairs
- Chowdhury family of Nandail, Mymensingh
  - Khurram Khan Chowdhury (1945–2021), politician
  - Anwarul Hossain Khan Chowdhury (died 2013), former adviser to the president
- Chowdhury family of Natore
  - Ashraf Ali Khan Chowdhury (1878–1941), politician
  - Abdus Sattar Khan Chowdhury, politician
  - Amjad Khan Chowdhury (1937–2015), founder of PRAN-RFL Group
- Chowdhury family of Nurshonapur, Noakhali
  - Badrul Haider Chowdhury (1925–1998), fifth Chief Justice of Bangladesh
  - Naima Haider Chowdhury (born 1962), Justice of the High Court Division
- Choudhury family of Ranakeli, Sylhet
  - Mahmudul Amin Choudhury (1937–2019), 11th Chief Justice of Bangladesh
  - Fatema Chowdhury Paru (1944–2002), politician
- Chowdhury family of Shat Aani, Bogra
  - Ismat Ara Chowdhury (1941–2020), former State Minister of Public Administration
  - Mamdudur Rahman Chowdhury (1946–2018), former Minister of Shipping
- Chowdhury family of Ulania, Barisal
  - Abdul Gaffar Chowdhury (1934–2022), poet and political analyst
  - Asad Chowdhury (born 1943), poet, writer, translator and journalist
- Kings of the Bohmong Circle
  - Maung Shwe Prue Chowdhury (1915–1998), 14th King of Bohmong Circle
  - Aung Shwe Prue Chowdhury (1914–2012), 15th King of Bohmong Circle

=== India ===
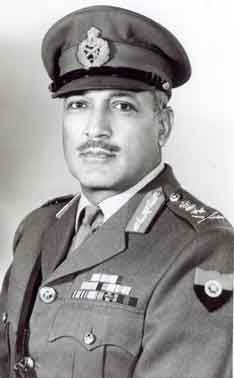
Jayanto Nath Chaudhuri

- Amitabh Chaudhry (born 1964/65), Indian banker, CEO and MD of Axis Bank
- Arindam Chaudhuri, Indian author
- Farukh Choudhary, Indian Association football player who plays for Jamshedpur FC in the Indian Super League
- Pratik Chaudhari (born 1989), Indian footballer playing as a defender for Jamshedpur
- Chaudhary Devi Lal, Deputy Prime Minister of India
- Shagun Chowdhary, Indian shooter
- Chaudhary Brahm Prakash Yadav, Chief Minister, Delhi
- Mohinder Singh Chaudhury, Indian politician
- R. B. Choudary, Indian film producer
- Gurmeet Choudhary, Indian television actor
- Ranjit Chowdhry, Indian actor
- Karmveer Choudhary, Indian actor
- Ankush Chaudhari, Marathi film actor

==== Andhra Pradesh and Telangana ====
- Veeramachineni Jagapathi Rao Chowdary, Telugu film actor
- K. V. Chowdary, Indian Revenue Service Central Vigilance Commissioner
- Renuka Chowdhury, Union Minister of State
- T. Ramaswamy Choudary, Lawyer, poet, playwright and reformer among the Telugu-speaking people
- Veerabhadram Chowdary, Telugu film director
- Y. S. Chowdary, Indian central minister for state
- Y. V. S. Chowdary, Telugu cinema writer, director, producer
- Narendra Choudary, Media entrepreneur and businessman
- Simran Choudhary, Actress and model
- Chandini Chowdary, Actress

==== Assam ====
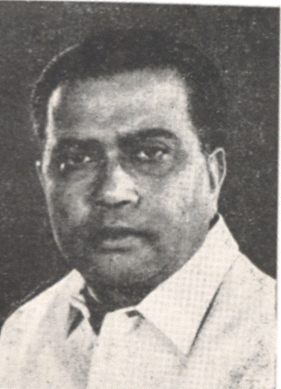
Moinul Hoque Choudhury

- Abdul Jalil Choudhury (1925–1989), Islamic scholar and politician
- Ambikagiri Raichoudhury, Assamese poet
- Anwaruddin Choudhury (born 1959), naturalist
- Avinov Choudhury (born 1999), cricketer
- Khalilur Rahman Chowdhury (Indian politician), MLA for Jamunamukh
- Mahendra Mohan Choudhury, Chief Minister of Assam and Governor of Punjab
- Moinul Hoque Choudhury, five-time MLA, two-time UN General Assembly representative and Minister of Industrial Development
- Mrinal Datta Chaudhuri, theoretical economist, academic and professor of the Delhi School of Economics.
- Rashida Haque Choudhury, former Minister of State of Social Welfare
- Rita Chowdhury, established poet and novelist, Sahitya Akademi Award recipient
- Choudhury family of Bagbari, Karimganj
  - Najib Ali Choudhury, Islamic scholar and teacher
  - Abdul Munim Choudhury, former MLA of Karimganj South

==== Uttar Pradesh ====
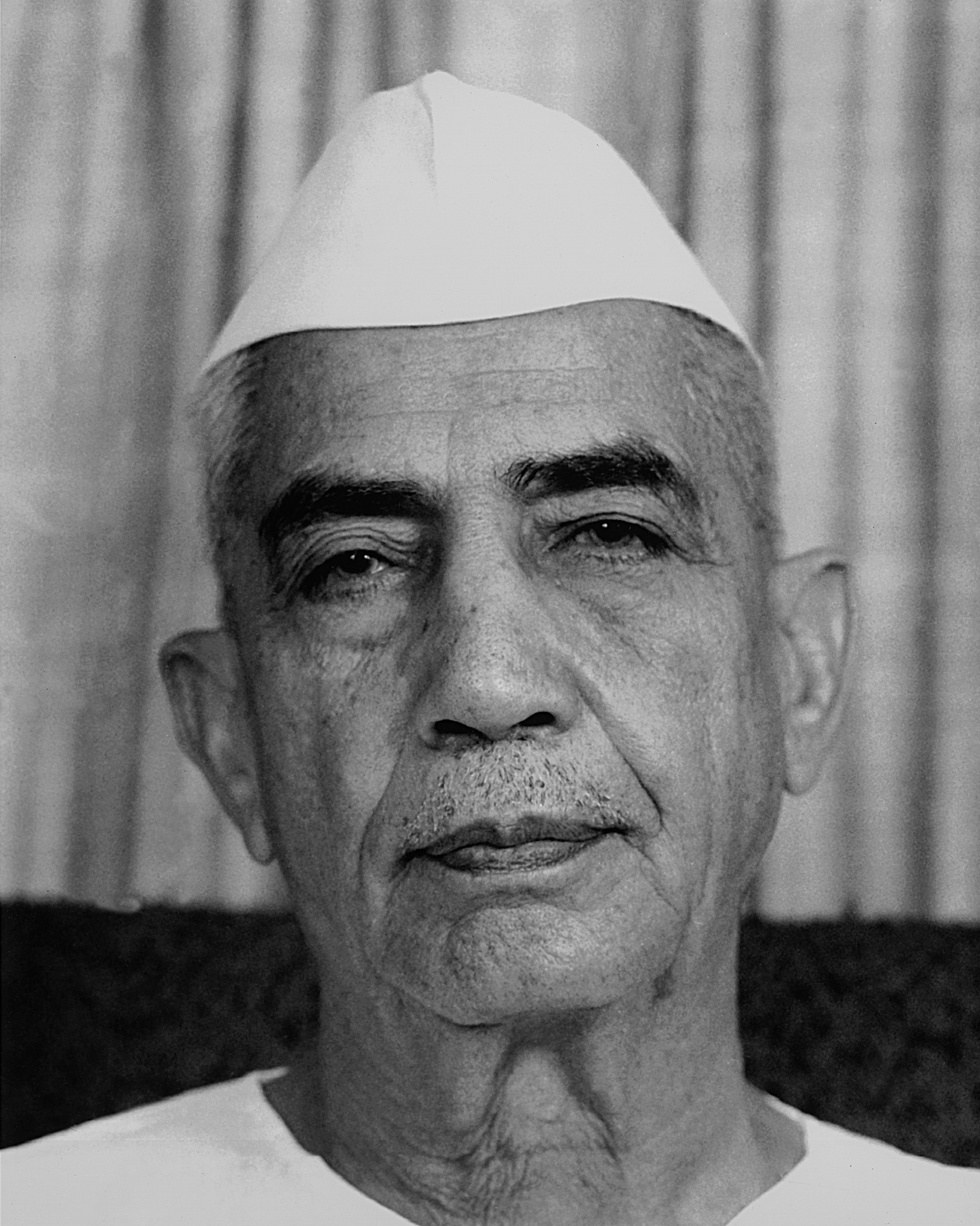
Charan Singh in 1979

- Chaudhary family of Noorpur, Meerut
  - Chaudhary Charan Singh (1902–1987), 5th prime minister of India and two term chief minister of Uttar Pradesh
  - Chaudhary Ajit Singh (1939–2021), former union minister and son of Charan Singh
  - Chaudhary Jayant Singh (born 1978), union minister of state for skill development, entrepreneurship and education and president of the Rashtriya Lok Dal
- Rahul Chaudhari, Indian kabaddi player
- Chaudhary Harmohan Singh Yadav, Shaurya Chakra awardee
- Aadesh Chaudhary, Indian actor
- Kamla Chaudhry (born 1908), Indian short story writer
- Yuvika Chaudhary (born 1983), Indian actress
- Chaudhary Gurjar family of Kairana
  - Chaudhary Munawwar Hasan (1964–2008), former MP
  - Chaudhary Nahid Hasan (born 1988), politician

==== Haryana ====
Chaudhary Devi Lal, former Feputy Prime Minister of India

- Chaudhary Ahmed family of Nuh, Mewat
  - Chaudhary Khurshid Ahmed (1934–2020), politician
  - Chaudhary Aftab Ahmed (born 1966), politician
- Chaudhary Hussain family of Mewat
  - Chaudhary Tayyab Husain (1936–2008), former MP and minister of state
  - Chaudhary Zakir Hussain, administrator of Haryana Waqf Board
  - Zahida Khan (born 1968), politician
- Chaudhary Rahim Khan family of Sultanpur, Mewat
  - Chaudhary Rahim Khan (1923–1987), former MP and minister of state
  - Chaudhary Sardar Khan, politician
  - Chaudhary Mohammad Ilyas Khan (born 1954), politician
  - Chaudhary Habib Ur Rehman (born 1957), politician

==== West Bengal ====
- Abdul Karim Chowdhury (born 1946), former Minister for Mass Education Extension and Library Services
- Abu Taleb Chowdhury (died 1971), former MP
- Amit Chaudhuri, Fellow of the Royal Society of Literature
- Anjan Choudhury, Bengali film director and writer
- Aniruddha Roy Chowdhury, Indian film director
- Adhir Ranjan Chowdhury, member of the 16th Lok Sabha of India
- Bula Choudhury (born 1970), Indian national women's swimming champion
- Chumki Choudhury (born 1970), Indian actress
- Jogen Chowdhury, 21st century Indian painter
- Joyanto Nath Chaudhuri, Chief of Staff of the Indian Army
- Mahima Chaudhry, Indian actress and model
- Nirad C. Chaudhuri, Indian writer
- Noor Alam Chowdhury (1943–2021), former acting Chief Justice in Calcutta High Court
- Pramatha Chaudhuri, 19th century Bengali writer and an influential figure in Bengali literature
- Rabiul Alam Chowdhury, former MLA
- Ravi Shankar (born Rabindra Shankar Chowdhury), Indian musician and a composer of Hindustani classical music
- Rina Choudhury, Indian actress
- Saifuddin Choudhury (1952–2014), communist
- Shankar Roychowdhury, Chief of Staff of the Indian Army
- Siddiqullah Chowdhury, president of Jamiat Ulema-e-Maghribi Bangal
- Somlata Acharyya Chowdhury, Indian singer
- Sonali Chowdhury, Indian actress
- Salil Chowdhury, Indian music director & composer
- Sarita Choudhury, Indian actress and model
- Tridha Choudhury, Indian actress
- Choudhury family of Sahazalalpur, Malda
  - Abu Barkat Ataul Ghani Khan Choudhury (1927–2006), former Union Minister
  - Abu Nasar Khan Choudhury (born 1935), former Minister of State for Science and Technology
  - Abu Hasem Khan Choudhury (born 1938), former Union Minister of State for Health and Family Welfare
  - Begum Rubi Choudhurani (1945–2008), four-time MLA
  - Isha Khan Choudhury (born 1971), politician

=== Nepal ===
- Binod Chaudhary (born 1955), Nepalese billionaire

=== Fiji ===
- Mahendra Chaudhry (born 1942), former Prime Minister of Fiji

=== Pakistan ===
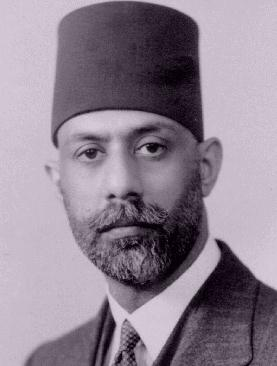
Choudhry Rahmat Ali

- Anwar Khurshid Chowdhry (1923–2010), former president of International Boxing Association
- Cecil Chaudhry (1941–2012), Pakistani academic, human rights activist, veteran fighter pilot
- Chaudhary Aadil Bakhsh Chattha, politician
- Chaudhry Abdul Hameed Khan (1906–1958), civil servant
- Chaudhry Abdul Jalil Chacha Cricket (born 1949), cricket mascot
- Chaudhry Abdul Majeed (1937–2006), nuclear chemist
- Chaudhry Abdul Majid (born 1946), former Prime Minister of Azad Jammu And Kashmir
- Chaudhry Abdul Rahim, legislator
- Chaudhry Abdul Razzaq Dhillon (born 1961), politician
- Chaudhry Abid Jotana (born 1982), politician
- Chaudhry Abid Raza (born 1972), politician
- Chaudhry Abid Sher Ali (born 1971), former Minister of State for Power
- Chaudhry Aftab Ahmed Gujjar, senior advocate
- Chaudhry Afzal Haq (1891–1942), author and co-founder of Majlis-e Ahrar-e Islam
- Chaudhry Akhtar Abbas Bosal (born 1973), politician
- Chaudhry Amir Hussain (born 1942), 17th Speaker of National Assembly
- Chaudhry Amjad Ali Javed (born 1965), politician
- Chaudhry Anwarul Haq (born 1970), Prime Minister of Azad Jammu and Kashmir
- Chaudhry Arshad Javaid Warraich (1956–2025), politician
- Chaudhry Ashfaq Ahmed (born 1967), politician
- Chaudhry Ashraf Ali Ansari (born 1969), politician
- Chaudhry Ashraf Deona (born 1946), politician
- Chaudhry Asif Majeed, politician
- Chaudhry Aslam Khan (1967–2014), police officer
- Chaudhry Azhar Qayyum Nahra (born 1977), politician
- Chaudhry Bilal Ijaz (born 1970), former chairman of Punjab Zakat Council
- Chaudhry Ejaz Yousaf (born 1952), 10th chief justice of the Federal Shariat Court
- Chaudhary Mohammad Akbar Ibrahim, former minister
- Chaudhry Muhammad Hussain, former chairman of Pakistan Cricket Board
- Chaudhry Muhammad Sarwar Khan (1919–2003), politician
- Chaudhry Muhammad Shafique (born 1952), politician
- Chaudhry Mumtaz Ahmed Jajja (1948–2011), agriculturist and politician
- Choudhry Rahmat Ali, Pakistan Movement activist and politician
- Chaudhry Tahir Mahmood Chahal Jatt (born 1984), politician
- Chaudry Tussadiq Masud Khan (born 1959), agriculturalist and politician
- Fazal Ilahi Chaudhry (1904–1982), fifth president of Pakistan
- Iftikhar Muhammad Chaudhry, former Chief Justice of Pakistan
- Michael A. Chowdry (1954–2001), founder of Atlas Air (FY 2019 revenue US$2.7 billion)
- Niaz Ahmad Chaudhry (born 1949), Horticultural researcher
- Rafi Muhammad Chaudhry (1903–1988), nuclear physicist
- Zafar Ahmad Chaudhry (1926–2019), human rights activist
- Chaudhary family of Ajnala, Gujrat
  - Anwar Aziz Chaudhry (1930–2020), swimmer and politician
  - Daniyal Aziz Chaudhry (born 1965), former Minister for Privatisation
- Chaudhary family of Chakri, Rawalpindi
  - Chaudhary Iftikhar Ali Khan (1941–2009), general
  - Chaudhary Nisar Ali Khan (born 1954), Minister of Interior
- Chaudhry family of Challianwala, Mandi Bahauddin
  - Chaudhry Muhammad Ashraf (1925–1983), businessman
  - Chaudhry Muhammad Zaka Ashraf (born 1952), chairman of Pakistan Cricket Board
  - Begum Ishrat Ashraf, politician
- Jutt Chaudhry family of Chichawatni, Sahiwal
  - Chaudhry Muhammad Tufail, politician
  - Chaudhry Muhammad Hanif (born 1963), politician
  - Chaudhry Muhammad Arshad Jutt (born 1970), politician
- Gujjar Chaudhry family of Rahim Yar Khan
  - Chaudhry Jaffar Iqbal Gujjar, former senator
  - Zeb Jaffar, politician
  - Chaudhry Muhammad Omar Jaffar (born 1982), politician
  - Maiza Hameed Gujjar, politician
- Warraich Chaudhry family of Gujrat
  - Chaudhry Zahoor Elahi (1917–1981), politician
  - Chaudhry Pervaiz Elahi (born 1945), former Chief Minister of Punjab
  - Chaudhry Shujaat Hussain (born 1946), 14th Prime Minister of Pakistan
  - Chaudhry Wajahat Hussain (born 1950), president of PML-Q
  - Chaudhry Moonis Elahi (born 1976), former federal minister
  - Chaudhry Salik Hussain (born 1979), former federal minister
  - Chaudhry Hussain Elahi, politician
- Chaudhry family of Dina, Jhelum
  - Chaudhry Mohammad Awais, politician
  - Chaudhry Altaf Hussain (1929–1995), three-time Governor of Punjab
  - Chaudhry Iftikhar Hussain (judge) (1946–2015), 36th Chief Justice of Lahore High Court
  - Chaudhry Shahbaz Hussain, restaurateur
  - Fawad Ahmed Hussain Chaudhry (born 1976), former minister
  - Chaudhry Farrukh Altaf, politician
- Arain Chaudhry family of Jalandhar (Muhajir)
  - Chaudhry Muhammad Ali (1905–1982), fourth Prime Minister of Pakistan
  - Chaudhry Khalid Anwer (born 1938), lawyer, jurist and constitutional expert
- Rana Chaudhry family of Rahon, Jalandhar (Muhajir)
  - Chaudhry Abdul Rehman Khan, nobleman
  - Nisar Fatima Zahra (1935–1991), politician
- Chaudhry family of Kamoke, Gujranwala
  - Chaudhry Abdul Wakeel Khan, politician
  - Chaudhry Akhtar Ali Khan (born 1957), politician
  - Chaudhry Rana Shamshad Ahmad Khan (1965–2015), former minister
- Rajput Chaudhry family of Kolian, Hoshiarpur (Muhajir)
  - Chaudhry Ali Akbar Khan (1910–1967), diplomat
  - Chaudhry Nisar Akbar Khan, retired army officer
- Rajput Chaudhry family of Quetta
  - Iftikhar Muhammad Chaudhry (born 1948), 20th Chief Justice of Pakistan
  - Arsalan Iftikhar Chaudhry (born 1976), medical doctor
- Chaudhry family of Sain De Khuie, Faisalabad
  - Chaudhry Mohammad Sarwar (born 1950), former governor of Punjab
  - Chaudhry Anas Sarwar (born 1983), leader of the Scottish Labour Party
- Sahi Chaudhry family
  - Chaudhry Ghulam Rasool Sahi (born 1944), politician
  - Chaudhry Muhammad Afzal Sahi (born 1949), former acting Governor of Punjab
  - Chaudhry Ali Afzal Sahi (born 1986), former provincial minister
- Cheema Chaudhry family of Sargodha
  - Chaudhry Anwar Ali Cheema (1935–2016), former government minister
  - Chaudhry Aamir Sultan Cheema (born 1962), politician
  - Chaudhry Muhammad Muneeb Sultan Cheema (born 1992), former provincial transport minister
- Siddiqi Chaudhry family of Chunar, Mirzapur (Muhajir)
  - Chaudhry Salimuzzaman Siddiqui (1897–1994), organic chemist
  - Chaudhry Khaliquzzaman Siddiqi (1889–1973), former president of Muslim League

=== United Kingdom ===
- Akhlaq Choudhury (born 1967), Judge of the British High Court of Justice
- Anas Sarwar Chaudhry (born 1983), leader of the Scottish Labour Party
- Anwar Choudhury (born 1959), diplomat at the Foreign and Commonwealth Office; former Governor of the Cayman Islands, British Ambassador to Peru and British High Commissioner to Bangladesh
- Anjem Choudary, Islamist political activist
- Asim Chaudhry, comedian and actor
- Atique Islam Choudhury (born 1963), restaurateur and chef
- Foysol Choudhury, Businessman, community activist and Chairman of Edinburgh and Lothians Regional Equality Council.
- Himanshi Choudhry, British actress
- Khaled Choudhury, theatre personality and artist
- Kirti N. Chaudhuri, British-Indian economic historian
- Mamun Chowdhury, businessman, and founder and co-director of London Tradition
- Navin Chowdhry, British actor
- Robin Choudhury, British cardiologist
- Roshonara Choudhry, British Islamic extremist
- Shafiqur Rahaman Chowdhury, president of the Bishwanath Expatriate Education Trust
- Shamim Chowdhury, TV and print journalist for Al Jazeera English
- Shefali Chowdhury, actress best known for the role of Padma Patil in the Harry Potter film series
- Sophie Choudry, British actress and singer
- Paul Chowdhry, English comedian of Punjabi origin
- Uzair Chowdhury, British artistic gymnast

=== United States ===
- Choudhri Mohammed Naim (born 1936), scholar of Urdu language and literature
- Jay Chaudhry (born 1958/1959), American billionaire, CEO and founder of Zscaler
- Michael Chowdry, founder of cargo airliner Atlas Air
- Satveer Chaudhary, former Minnesota state senator
- Subir Chowdhury, author and management consultant

== Chaudhary ==
=== Business ===
- Binod Chaudhary (1955-), a Nepalese businessman, industrialist, philanthropist, and politician
- Fawad Chaudhry a Pakistani businessman, landlord, lawyer and politician

=== Acting, modelling and entertainment ===
- Areej Chaudhary (1997), Pakistani actress, psychologist, Miss Pakistan Universe-2020, Miss Earth-2020, Miss Global-2022
- Ekta Chowdhry (1986-), Miss India Universe-2009
- Raja Chaudhary (1975-), an Indian television actor, writer and producer
- Gaurav Chaudhary (1991-), an Indian YouTuber, media personality, and engineer
- Ajay Chaudhary, an Indian television actor and model
- Yuvika Chaudhary (1983-), an Indian actress
- Meenakshi Chaudhary, is an Indian model
- Basanta Chowdhury (1928–2000), an Indian actor
- Saket Chaudhary, an Indian screenwriter and director
- Sakshi Chaudhary (1993), an Indian model and actress from Dehradun, Uttarakhand
- Aadesh Chaudhary, an Indian television actor
- Parull Chaudhry, an Indian television actress
- Urvashi Chaudhary (1986-), an Indian actress and model
- Raj Singh Chaudhary, an Indian actor
- Ksshitij Chaudhary, an Indian Punjabi film director
- Hema Chaudhary (1955-), an Indian actress in Kannada, Telugu, Malayalam, and Tamil films
- Aastha Chaudhary, an Indian actress
- Arav Chaudhary, an Indian actor
- Ankush Choudhary, Indian actor, screenwriter, director, producer and theatre personality in Marathi cinema
- Mahima Chaudhry, Indian actress
- Aashish Chaudhary, Indian actor
- Gurmeet Choudhary, Indian actor

=== Politics ===
- Aun Chaudhry, Pakistani politician and businessman
- Nabakrushna Choudhuri, former Chief minister of Odisha
- Ramadevi Choudhury, freedom fighter & social reformer
- Gopabandhu Choudhury, Indian activist, Freedom fighter
- Harish Chaudhary politician of Congress from Rajasthan
- Haribhai Chaudhary politician of Congress from Gujarat
- Awadh Bihari Choudhary, Speaker of the Bihar Legislative Assembly
- Ram Govind Chaudhary, Former Leader of Opposition in Uttar Pradesh Legislative Assembly
- Sarveen Choudhary, cabinet minister in Bharatiya Janata Party ministry in Himachal Pradesh holding Urban, Town & Country Planning departments.
- Babulal Chaudhary (1948-), an Indian Bharatiya Janata Party politician
- Haribhai Parthibhai Chaudhary (1954-), an Indian politician and Minister of State for Coal and Mines
- Ejaz Chaudhary (1956-), a prominent Pakistani politician, social worker, civil engineer
- P. P. Chaudhary (1953-), a Union Minister of State
- Shanta Chaudhary, a social reformer and Former Member of Constituent Assembly of Nepal
- Chaudhary Manisha Ashok, an Indian politician and member of the Bharatiya Janata Party
- Satveer Chaudhary (1969-), an American politician
- Amarsinh Chaudhary (1941–2004), an Indian politician
- Jayant Chaudhary, an Indian politician from Mathura
- Lal Singh Chaudhary (politician) (1959-), an Indian politician from Jammu and Kashmir
- Chhotu Ram Chaudhary, an Indian politician of the Bharatiya Janata Party
- Balbir Prasad Chaudhary, a Nepali politician
- Hemlata Chaudhary, an Indian politician from Uttar Pradesh
- Tushar Amarsinh Chaudhary (1965-), an Indian politician of the Indian National Congress in Gujarat
- Shankar Chaudhary (1970-), an Indian politician from Gujarat
- Bhairaram Chaudhary, an Indian politician from the Bharatiya Janata Party from Rajasthan
- Arun Chaudhary, an American political operative and filmmaker
- Manibhai Chaudhary (1947-) an Indian politician of the Bharatiya Janata Party
- Aruna Chaudhary, an Indian politician of Indian National Congress from Punjab
- Dayaram Chaudhary, an Indian politician from Uttar Pradesh
- R. K. Chaudhary, an Indian politician and former Minister of Roadways, Health
- Roop Chaudhary, an Indian politician and member of the Bharatiya Janata Party from Uttar Pradesh
- Genda Lal Chaudhary, an Indian politician representing Hathras
- Nisha Chaudhary (1952-), a social worker and politician representing Sabarkantha
- Bhupendra Chaudhary, state minister of Uttar Pradesh
- Vijay Kumar Chaudhary (1957-) an Indian politician from Bihar
- Arvind Kumar Chaudhary, an Indian politician of the Bahujan Samaj Party
- Sanjay Chaudhary, an Indian politician of the Bharatiya Janata Party
- Laxmilal Chaudhary, a Nepalese politician of the Nepal Loktantrik Samajbadi Dal
- Amar Singh Chaudhary, an Indian politician of the Siddharth Nagar district, Uttar Pradesh
- Birendra Kumar Chaudhary, an Indian politician from Jhanjharpur (Lok Sabha constituency)
- Ram Prasad Chaudhary, an Indian politician from Uttar Pradesh
- Vidya Sagar Chaudhary, an Indian politician of the Bharatiya Janata Party from Himachal Pradesh
- Dilli Bahadur Chaudhary Chief minister of Lumbini Province, Nepal
- Umakant Chaudhary – politician and the former minister for Water Supply of Nepal
- Resham Lal Chaudhary Nepalese politician and member of Federal Parliament.

=== Sports ===
- Anil Chaudhary (umpire) (1965-), an Indian cricket umpire
- Saurabh Chaudhary (2002-), an Indian Sport Shooter
- Garima Chaudhary (1990-), an Indian judoka
- Ishwar Chaudhary (1988-), an Indian cricketer
- Shweta Chaudhry (1986), an Indian shooter
- Harendra Chaudhary (1976-), an Indian cricketer
- Aditya Chaudhary (1996-), a footballer from Nepal
- Shivam Chaudhary (1997-), an Indian cricketer
- Vijay Chaudhary, an Indian wrestler
- Dipendra Chaudhary (1980-), a Nepalese cricketer
- Nikhil Chaudhary (cricketer) (1996-), an Indian cricketer
- Sachin Chaudhary (1983-), an Indian powerlifter
- Nilesh Chaudhary (1983-), an Indian cricketer
- Rahul Chaudhari (1983-), an Indian kabaddi player
- Mamta Chaudhary, a Nepali cricketer
- Sarswati Chaudhary, Nepali sprinter

=== Academia, science & scholarship ===
- Arknath Chaudhary, a Sanskrit scholar and vice-chancellor of Shree Somnath Sanskrit University
- Ram Chet Chaudhary, an Indian agricultural scientist
- Shamila N. Chaudhary, a foreign policy expert
- Jai Bhagwan Chaudhary, a former Vice-Chancellor of Haryana Agricultural University

=== Journalism ===
- Sudhir Chaudhary (journalist), an Indian journalist, editor
- Omkar Chaudhary (1961-), an Indian journalist, writer, and editor

=== Other occupations ===
- Nand Kishore Chaudhary (1953-), an Indian social entrepreneur
- Akshay Chandra Chaudhury (1850–1898), an Indian poet and novelist
- Aisha Chaudhary (1996–2015), a motivational speaker

== Chaudhari ==
Chaudhari (Hindi: चौधरी, Punjabi: ਚੌਧਰੀ, Marathi: चौधरी) is a surname. Notable people with the surname include:

- Ankush Chaudhari (born 1977), Indian film actor
- Bahinabai Chaudhari (1880–1951), Marathi language poet
- Manish Chaudhari (born 1969), Indian actor
- Nirupa Chaudhari, American biologist
- Pramod Chaudhari, businessman from Maharashtra
- Pratik Chaudhari (born 1989), Indian footballer
- Praveen Chaudhari (1937–2010), Indian American physicist
- Radhika Chaudhari, Indian actress
- Raghuveer Chaudhari (born 1938), Indian male novelist
- Rahul Chaudhari (born 1992/1993), Indian professional Kabaddi player
- Ramkumari Chaudhari (born 1985), Nepali politician
- Shirish Hiralal Chaudhari, Indian politician
- Vivek Ram Chaudhari (born 1962), Indian Air Force air marshal

== Chaudhri ==
- Amjad Ali Chaudhri (1917–1990), Pakistani military officer who fought in the Indo-Pakistani War of 1965
- Haleem Chaudhri (?–1971), Bengali cricketer, hero of the Liberation War of Bangladesh
- Imran Chaudhri (born 1973), British-American designer
- Iqbal Chaudhri, Pakistani cricketer
- Nadia Chaudhri (1978–2021), Pakistani-Canadian psychologist
- Shufti Chaudhri (1920–2015), officer of the 16th Punjab Regiment
- Tara Chaudhri (?–2013), Indian classical dancer.

== Chaudhry ==
- Sultan Mehmood Chaudhry (1950 or 1951–2026), Pakistani Azad Kashmiri politician

== Chaudhuri ==
- Mihir Kanti Chaudhuri (1947–2024), Indian inorganic chemist
- Sujata Chaudhuri (23 March 1901–?), Indian professor of medicine

== Choudhury ==
- Annapurna Choudhury (1917–2012), freedom fighter, women right's activist & one of the close ally of Mahatma Gandhi.
- Debabani Choudhury, Indian and American microwave communications engineer
- Gopabandhu Choudhury (1895–1958), Indian activist, social worker, politician and freedom fighter from Odisha.
- Juhaim Rasul Choudhury (born 2005), English actor
- Nabakrushna Choudhury (1901–1984), former Chief Minister of Odisha, who elected 2 times as Chief Minister. freedom fighter.
- Ramadevi Choudhury (1899–1985), Indian freedom fighter & social reformer from Odisha.
- Suchibrata Roy Choudhury (1931–2009), Indian poet

== Chaudhurani ==
- Faizunnesa Choudhurani, Muslim feminist and awarded the title Nawab by Queen Victoria
- Indira Devi Chaudhurani, Indian literary figure, author and musician.
- Karimunnesa Khanam Chaudhurani (1855–1926), Bengali poet, social worker, and patron of literature.
- Sarala Devi Chaudhurani, founder of the first women's organisation in India, the Bharat Stree Mahamandal in Allahabad in 1910.

== Fictional characters ==
- Indra Chaudhari, the protagonist of Axiom Verge 2

== Other ==
- Chaudhry and Sons, a 2022 Pakistani romantic family comedy drama television series
- Chacha Chaudhary, an Indian comic book character
- Chacha Chaudhary (2002 TV series), an Indian children's television series
- Chaudhary Karnail Singh, a 1960 Indian Punjabi-language film
- Chaudhary Charan Singh Airport, an international airport serving Lucknow
- Chaudhary Charan Singh International Airport metro station in Lucknow
- Saint-Christophe-le-Chaudry, a commune located in Cher, France

== Further disambiguation pages ==
- Rajendra Chaudhary (disambiguation), several people

=== Organisations ===
- Chaudhary Group (CG Global), a multi-national conglomerate headquartered in Nepal
- Chaudhary Charan Singh Post Graduate College, a college in Heonra-Saifai, Etawah
- Chaudhary Ranbir Singh University, a university in Jind, Haryana
- Chaudhary Bansi Lal University, a university in Bhiwani, Haryana
- Chaudhary Charan Singh University, a university in Meerut, Uttar Pradesh
- Chaudhary Devi Lal University, a university in Haryana
- Dutta Chowdhury family, West Bengal, India.
- Savarna Roy Chowdhury family, West Bengal, India.
