= Ghulam Mohiuddin =

Ghulam Muhy al-Din (Arabic: غلام محي الدين; transliterations vary), an Arabic phrase meaning "Servant of the Reviver of the Faith", is a male Muslim given name in reference to Muhy al-Din Abdul Qadir Gilani. Notable bearers of the name include;

- Shaikh Ghulam Muhy-ud-Din (died 1846), Governor of Kashmir under Sikh Empire
- Ghulam Mohiuddin Khan (died 1969), sixth Prince of Arcot, India
- Ghulam Mohiyuddin Gilani (1891–1974), Pakistani Sufi saint
- Golam Mohiuddin Faroqui (1891–1984), Bengali knight and politician
- Ghulam Mohi-ud-Din Ghaznavi (1902–1975), Pakistani Sufi saint
- Ghulam Mohiddin Gunga (born 1934), Afghan wrestler
- Ghulam Mohieddin Shabnam (1935–2009), Afghan painter
- Ghulam Mohiuddin (actor) (born 1951), Pakistani actor in Urdu and Punjabi films
- A. H. Ghulam Mohiuddin, Bangladeshi diplomat and former Permanent Representative of Bangladesh to the United Nations
- Golam Mohiuddin Chowdhury, Bangladeshi retired major general
- Golam Mohiuddin, Indian politician
