= Shamim Chowdhury =

English television and print journalist

- শামীম চৌধুরী
- Born: London, England
- Education: Queen Mary University; Birkbeck College; City University London
- Occupation: Journalist
- Relatives: Muhammad Ataul Gani Osmani (great uncle)
- Awards: Winner of British-Bangladeshi Outstanding Achievement Award 2014

Shamim Ara Chowdhury (Bengali: শামীম আরা চৌধুরী) is an English television and print journalist.

== Early life and education ==
Chowdhury was born into a Bengali Muslim Chowdhury family in England, United Kingdom. Her parents migrated from Sylhet, East Pakistan (now Bangladesh) to the United Kingdom in the early 1970s. Muhammad Ataul Gani Osmani, the commander-in-chief of the Bengali liberation forces, is her great-uncle and grew up in the same household as her paternal grandfather, Azadur Rahman Chowdhury, who himself was the postmaster general of the Sylhet district.

Chowdhury has a BSc from Queen Mary University, a MSc from Birkbeck College, and a post-graduate diploma in newspaper journalism from City University London.

== Career ==
Chowdhury started out in print journalism and has written for a number of British national newspapers, including The Daily Express, The Daily Mail, The Daily Telegraph, and The Independent, where she wrote a number of op-eds on a range of socio-political issues. She also used to have her own column in the English-language Bangladeshi newspaper, Bangla Mirror.

In 2007, Chowdhury started working for Al Jazeera English as a deputy news editor. Her later roles included news editor, reporter and producer. She was based mainly in London, but also worked occasionally in the main news centre in Doha, Qatar. She was involved in a wide range of stories for the channel, including the 2013 Ukraine crisis, the collapse of the Rana Plaza building complex in Bangladesh and the Bangladeshi elections. She was regarded as the channel's Bangladesh expert.

Since 2015, she has been working as a foreign correspondent for the Turkish television news channel, TRT World. During this time she has reported from inside Syria, Iraq, South Korea, Jerusalem, Bangladesh, Mongolia, Sri Lanka, the Philippines and many European countries. She also produced and reported an exclusive series of reports on Bangladesh's burgeoning economy, including a half-hour documentary of the subject.

Her interviews include former Prime Minister of Turkey Binali Yıldırım; Gowher Rizvi, the International Affairs Adviser to the Prime Minister of Bangladesh; and Kamal Hossain, a founding leader of Bangladesh.

She has also written extensively for The Huffington Post on a wide range of socio-political issues.

Her previous television experience includes work at the BBC, ITN, and Sky News.

Chowdhury has taken part in current affairs and politics debates at The House of Lords and on live television discussion programmes.

Since October 2013, Chowdhury has been a judging panel member at the Asian Media Awards.

== Personal life ==
Chowdhury is a Muslim and lives in West London. She has visited more than 65 countries including parts of the Middle East, Africa and Asia. On one occasion, she worked with a leading charity to help build a community centre in a remote part of Cambodia.

== See also ==
- British Bangladeshi
- List of British Bangladeshis
