= Rajendra Chaudhary =

Rajendra Chaudhary may refer to:

- Rajendra Chaudhary (Rajasthan politician) (born 1955)
- Rajendra Chaudhary (Uttar Pradesh politician) (born 1956)
