= Trump Card (2010 film) =

2010 Bollywood film

Trump Card is a 2010 Bollywood film directed by Arshad Khan. The film stars Vishwajeet Pradhan, Vikram Kumar, Haidar Ali, Urvashi Chaudhary. This is a thriller story of deceit, love crime. This film was released on 12 March 2010.

poster

== Cast ==
- Vishwajeet Pradhan
- Vikram Kumar
- Haider Ali
- Urvashi Chaudhary

== Soundtrack ==
The music was composed by Lalit Sen.

Trump Card

Soundtrack album by Lalit Sen
- Released: 2009
- Recorded: 2009
- Genre: Soundtrack
- Length: 27:34
- Label: Planet41
- Producer: Lalit Sen

Track list
No.	Title	Lyrics	Singer(s)	Length
1.	"Shadows Of The Night"	Lalit Sen	Suzanne D'Mello	1:55
2.	"Life Is Fun"	Nawab Arzoo	Sunidhi Chauhan, Shaan	5:43
3.	"Raat Ka Jaadu"	Sunil Jha	Sunidhi Chauhan, Shaan	5:17
4.	"Dil Nakaam"	Sunil Jha	Sunidhi Chauhan	5:06
5.	"Anta Habibi"	Shakeel Azmi	Kunal Ganjawala	4:19
6.	"Tumhare Liye"	Nawab Arzoo	Alka Yagnik, Kunal Ganjawala	5:10
Total length:				27:34
