= Omkar Chaudhary =

Indian journalist and writer

- ओमकार चौधरी
- Born: 7 February 1961 (age 65); Dabathwa, Meerut, Uttar Pradesh, India
- Citizenship: Indian
- Occupations: Journalist and writer
- Years active: 1983 – present
- Known for: Journalism

Omkar Chaudhary (born 7 February 1961, Dabathwa, Meerut, Uttar Pradesh, India) is an Indian journalist and writer who is currently editor in National Newspaper Hari Bhoomi Haryana. He has worked in many different Indian Hindi newspapers in his career. Thousands of articles have been published so far. Ten books have been printed on different subjects. One of his books has muffled a researcher from Kurukshetra University on the inscription on time. As an analyst and reviewer, many TV channels and Akashwani have been associated. He has been honored with many awards in his thirty-four journalistic career. Omkar Chaudhary started his journalism career from the Sandhya Dainik Prabhat newspaper published in Meerut in 1983.

== Personal life ==
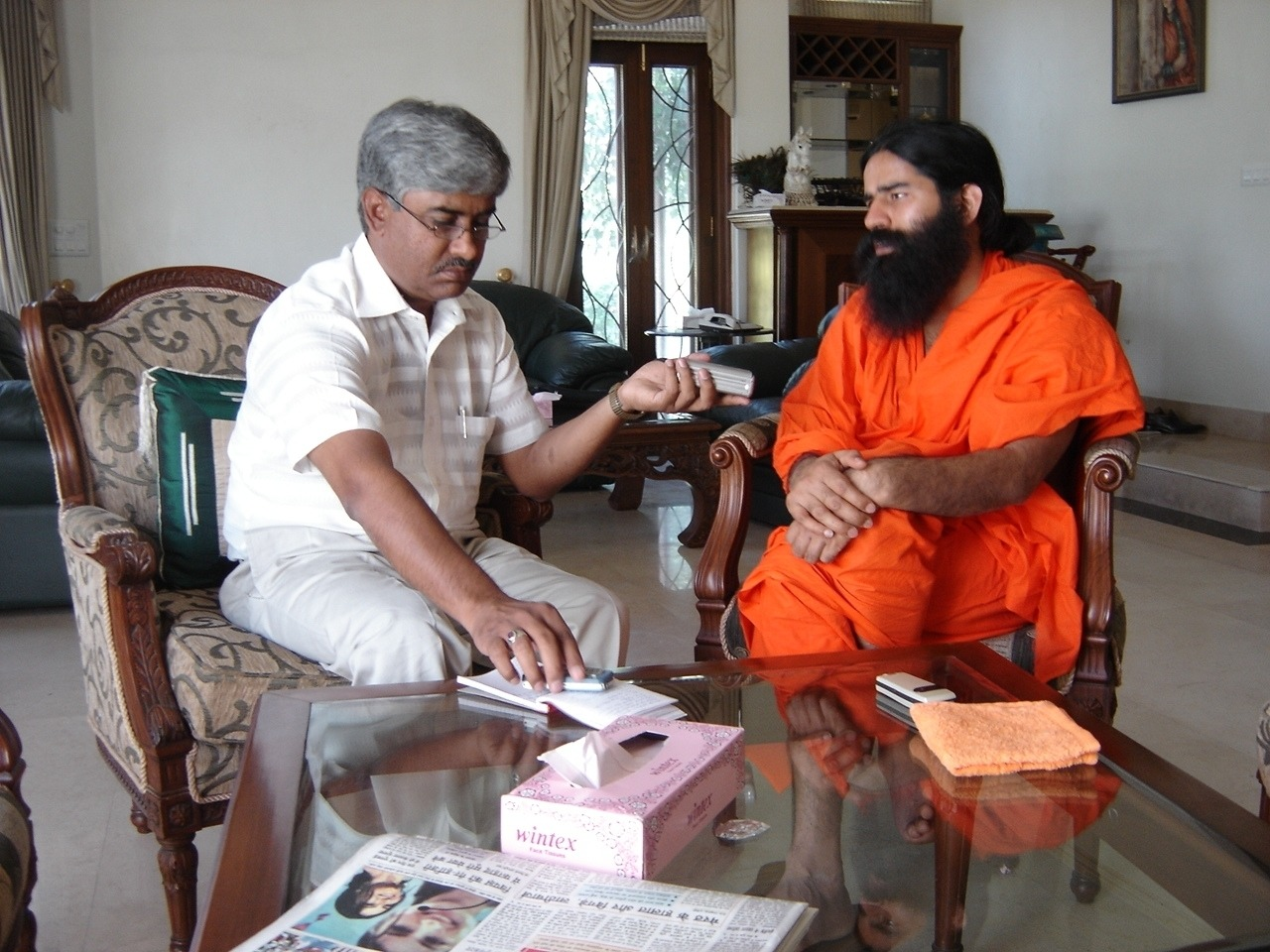
Omkar Chaudhary with Yoga Guru Ramdev.

Journalist and writer Omkar Chaudhary was born in a farmer's family in Dabethuwa village of Meerut city, Uttar Pradesh, India. Raised in a joint family he did his primary education from village's primary school and intermediate from Shri Gandhi Smaarak Inter College, Dabathwa. He did his graduation from Meerut College, Meerut. His parents Shri Briham Singh and Smt. Vidya Devi had 5 children (4 boys and 1 girl), Omkar, 4th child in order, was always interested in arts and music. He married Smt. Kamlesh Chaudhary in 1981 and together they have two children. His son Ankur Chaudhary is an FTII (National Film School, Pune) graduate in Sound Recording-Designing and professionally works in Mumbai Film Industry with his wife Shelly Attrishi, who's also a media professional-currently working with web portal First Post (Network 18) as Branded Content Manager. His daughter Kaveri Chaudhary is an active Interior Designer in Ghaziabad, Uttar Pradesh.

== Career ==
Right from the school days he was interested in writing. His college time poems and other write-ups regularly got published in local newspapers. After initiating his media career from Meerut’s Saandhya Dainik Prabhat in 1981, he got promoted and joined Hindi daily Dainik Jagran in 1986. Here he grew in experience and stature and held many responsible positions as one of the most recognized and respected journalist around the region. In 1997 he was promoted and assigned to conceptualize and introduce the Chandigarh edition of Hindi daily Amar Ujala. After enjoying a successful tenure as editorial bureau-chief in Chandigarh, Chaudhary joined the national bureau of Amar Ujala in 2001. Here, as a national correspondent, he covered states like Uttar Pradesh, Haryana, Chandigarh, Himachal Pradesh, Punjab, India and Delhi. He held major beats like Prime Minister Office, Home Ministry, Parliament, Tourism etc. and political parties like Indian National Congress, Samajwadi Party, RLD etc. During his national capital tenure, he travelled all around the country to cover major events. In 2013 he also travelled to London on a special trip of aviation ministry, which ultimately turned out to be a wonderful subject for his next travelogue book Done-Done London. And Since 2004, he's been associated with Haryana’s Hindi Daily Hari Bhoomi as its active Editor, stationed in Rohtak City. Two major high points of his career have been to successfully start fresh newspaper editions. Amar Ujala’s Chandigarh edition in 1999 and DLA's Meerut edition in 2008 started under his editorial supervision.
