= Nural Hoda Choudhury =

Bengali politician

Mawlana Nural Hoda Choudhury
- নূরুল হুদা চৌধুরী

Member of the National Assembly of Pakistan
- In office 1965–1969
- Preceded by: Abbas Ali Khan
- Succeeded by: Constituency abolished
- Constituency: Dinajpur-cum-Bogra

Personal details
- Born: Bengal Presidency
- Party: Muslim League

Nural Hoda Choudhury (Bengali: নূরুল হুদা চৌধুরী) was a Bengali politician and Pakistan Movement leader based in Dinajpur. He was a member of the 4th National Assembly of Pakistan.

== Early life ==
Nural Hoda was born into a Bengali Muslim family of Choudhuries in the village of Rajarampur in Fulbari, Dinajpur District, Bengal Presidency. His father, Sharfuddin Choudhury, was the founder of Rajarampur Primary School (est. 1913) in which Muhammad Shahidullah briefly taught at.

== Career ==
Choudhury joined the Pakistan Movement and became a founding member of the Dinajpur District Muslim League in 1937. He was later made the vice-president of the Dinajpur Muslim League. He also served as the vice-chairman of the Dinajpur District Board and was a representative member for the Radcliffe-Roedad Mission.

Choudhury was elected to the Dinajpur-cum-Bogra constituency as a member of the National Assembly of Pakistan following the 1965 elections under the Basic Democracy system. He contested in the 1970 Pakistani general election as a Muslim League candidate for the Dinajpur-5 constituency, losing to Shah Mahatab Ahmad of the Awami League. He is credited for the establishing the three-storey student accommodation at Fulbari College.

== Personal life ==
Choudhury had a son named Lauha-Manav Muhammad Ali Choudhury Badshah.
