= Praj =

Indian process and engineering company

PRAJ Industries Limited
- Company type: Public
- Traded as: BSE: 522205; NSE: PRAJIND
- Industry: Manufacturing, Engineering and Service
- Founded: 1983
- Headquarters: Pune, Maharashtra, India
- Areas served: Worldwide
- Key people: Pramod Chaudhari (Executive Chairman)
- Products: Ethanol plant Brewery Plants; Water & Waste Water Solutions; Process equipment and systems supplier High Purity solutions Bioproducts; Research services
- Revenue: ▲₹1,330.41 crore (US$140 million) (2021)
- Net income: ▲₹81.05 crore (US$8.5 million) (2021)
- Total assets: ▲₹1,593.82 crore (US$170 million) (2021)
- Total equity: ▲₹802.51 crore (US$84 million) (2021)
- Number of employees: 940 (2021)
- Website: www.praj.net

Praj Industries Limited is an Indian multinational process and project engineering company, headquartered in Pune, Maharashtra. The company also has offices in South Africa, North America, Latin America, the Caribbean, Thailand and Philippines. Its manufacturing facilities are at 4 locations – in Sanaswadi, near Pune; Kandla, Port in Gujarat and Wada, Thane District. Praj is a recipient of the DSIR National Award in 2005 for outstanding In-House R&D Achievements.

== History ==
Praj was formed in 1983. The company went public in 1994 and is listed on the Bombay Stock Exchange and National Stock Exchange of India. Praj received its first Venture Capital from ICICI Bank in 1987. Today it has investors like venture capitalist Vinod Khosla who has a 10% stake and Marubeni Corporation. Praj Foundation was established in 2005 as the CSR wing which is managed by Parimal Chaudhari. In 2021, the company and Indian Oil Corporation signed a memorandum of understanding to explore opportunities in the production of alcohol-to-jet (ATJ) fuels, 1G & 2G ethanol, compressed biogas and other related opportunities in the biofuels sector.

== Business divisions ==
The company deals with segments like Alcohol / Fuel Ethanol and Brewery Plants, Water and Wastewater Treatment Plants, Critical Process Equipment System, High Purity Systems, BioProducts (Livestock Health and Nutrition Products), and Customised Research Service & Solutions.

== Subsidiaries and acquisitions ==
The company's acquisitions include – Praj HiPurity Systems Limited (erstwhile Neela Systems Ltd), Praj Americas. Inc, Praj Far East Co. Ltd., Praj Industries (Africa) Pty. Ltd., Praj Far East Philippines Ltd. Inc., Praj Industries (Tanzania) Ltd. {subsidiary of Praj Industries (Africa) Pty. Ltd.}, Praj Industries (Sierra Leone) Ltd. (subsidiary of Praj Industries (Africa) Pty Ltd., Praj sur America SRL, Praj Engineering & Infra Ltd.

== Awards and recognition ==
- Praj was awarded the National Award for outstanding In-House R&D Achievements by DSIR in 2005.
- Praj was awarded the "Association of Biotechnology Led Enterprises|ABLE 10th anniversary award" under bio-industrial category for contribution to industrial biotechnology.
- Praj Tower received ‘Platinum’ LEED Certification from IGBC.
- Praj Bags B.G. Deshmukh CSR Innovation Award
- Praj received ‘Solar Energy Society of India (SESI) Business Leadership Award’ at the ICORE 2005
- Praj was awarded Forbes Best Under A Billion Company in Asia

== Initiatives ==
=== Industry innovations ===
1. Launched the ‘Water Master Class’ knowledge forum in Chennai that aims at sharing industry experts’ experience in water & wastewater management and treatment of complex industrial effluents.
2. Licensing and Joint Development Agreements With Gevo
3. Develops innovative method to produce Ethanol Matrix, the R&D Center (division of Praj Industries) is based on the foundation of scientific expertise and technology development. Located in Pune (India), Praj Matrix is organized around the 5 major Centers of Excellence. Molecular Biology and Microbiology; Bioprocess Technology Analytical Sciences; Chemical Sciences; and Scale up and Process engineering. It is supported by over 100 technologists including 20 PhDs.
4. Introduced ‘BioWiz’ Smart Bioreactor.
