= University of Minnesota Crookston =

Public university in Crookston, Minnesota, US

Coordinates: 47°47′59.91″N 96°36′28.79″W

- Former names: University of Minnesota Technical Institute (1966–1968); University of Minnesota Technical College (1968–1988)
- Type: Public college
- Established: 1966
- Parent institution: University of Minnesota system
- Chancellor: Mary Holz-Clause
- Students: 1,489
- Location: Crookston, Minnesota, U.S.
- Campus: Rural, 108 acres (44 ha)
- Colors: Maroon & Gold
- Nickname: Golden Eagles
- Sporting affiliations: NSIC (NCAA Division II)
- Mascot: Regal the Eagle
- Website: crk.umn.edu
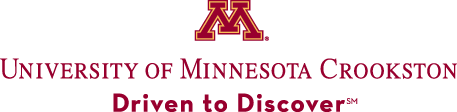

The University of Minnesota Crookston (UMN–Crookston) is a public college in Crookston, Minnesota, United States. One of five campuses in the University of Minnesota system, UMN Crookston had a fall 2022 enrollment of 1,489 undergraduate students. Students come from 20 countries and 40 states.

Located on the northern edge of Crookston, Minnesota, off U.S. Highway 2, the 108-acre (44 ha) campus (237 acres (96 ha) including research plots of the Northwest Research and Outreach Center) is situated in the Red River Valley, the center of a large agricultural region. The region is the transition point from the forested areas of the east to the great plains of the Dakotas.

== History ==
In 1895, the Minnesota legislature appropriated $30,000 to construct experimental research farms at Morris and Crookston. The Great Northern Railway, under the guidance of James J. Hill, donated 476 acres (193 ha), and the Northwest Experiment Station was established.

In 1905, the Minnesota legislature appropriated $15,000 to establish the "Northwest School of Agriculture" (NWSA), a regional residential agricultural high school. Affiliated with the University of Minnesota, the school provided training in "the technical and practical business of agriculture and in the art of homemaking." The school year began in October and ended in March to accommodate farm students. In 1906, the Northwest School of Agriculture officially opened.

In 1963, the University of Minnesota Bureau of Field Studies began examining the need for a two-year institution of higher education at the NWSA and, in the fall of 1966, the "University of Minnesota Technical Institute", a two-year (associate) degree granting institution, opened its doors to the first incoming class of 187 students.

For two years the NWSA and the Technical Institute shared the campus. In the spring of 1968 a torch was passed—figuratively and literally—from the 60th and final graduating class of the NWSA to the first graduating class of the Technical Institute, now an official coordinate campus of the University of Minnesota. In all, 5,433 students completed their high school education at the NWSA. Later in 1968 the name of the campus was changed from the University of Minnesota Technical Institute to the "University of Minnesota Technical College".

By 1977, the University of Minnesota Technical College had nearly 1,000 students taking classes in a range of degree options in the areas of agriculture; business; home and family services; and hotel, restaurant and institutional management. In 1988, the name was changed to the University of Minnesota Crookston.

In 1993, the University of Minnesota Crookston became a baccalaureate degree granting institution. That same year, the university launched its "Laptop U" initiative, providing laptop computers to all students and faculty. It is recognized as one of the first programs of its kind in the United States. Over the next few years, more than 100 colleges and universities from across the U.S. and Canada visited the campus to learn more about this innovation. Some of these adopted programs modeled closely after the one at UMN Crookston.

=== Chief Executive Officers ===
- 1966-1985 - Stanley D. Sahlstrom, director (1966-1970) provost (1970-1985)
- 1985-2003 - Donald G. Sargeant, provost (1985-?), chancellor (?-2003)
- 2003-2004 - Velmer Burton, Jr., chancellor
- 2004-2005 - Joseph Massey, chief executive officer
- 2005-2012 - Charles H. Casey, chancellor
- 2012–2016 - Fred E. Wood, chancellor
- 2017 (January through June) - Barbara Keinath, interim chancellor
- 2017–present - Mary Holz-Clause, chancellor

== Academics ==
Undergraduate demographics as of Fall 2023
Race and ethnicity	Total
White	71%
Black	7%
Hispanic	7%
International student	5%
Asian	4%
Two or more races	4%
Unknown	3%
American Indian/Alaska Native	1%
Economic diversity
Low-income (Note: The percentage of students who received an income-based federal Pell grant intended for low-income students.)	31%
Affluent (Note: The percentage of students who are a part of the American middle class at the bare minimum.)	69%

Academic rankings

Liberal arts
- Washington Monthly: 94

Regional
- U.S. News & World Report: 115

National
- Forbes: RNP

As of November 2023, the University of Minnesota Crookston offers 75+ majors, minors, and certificates, and four program options: Agriculture and Natural Resources; Business; Humanities, Social Sciences and Education; and Math, Science and Technology. Since 2004, the university has gained approval from the University of Minnesota Board of Regents to offer additional majors in additional subjects. It is accredited by the Higher Learning Commission.

As of spring semester 2019, sixteen degree programs are offered entirely online (as well as on campus.) In January 2011, the New Century Learning Consortium (NCLC), founded at the University of Illinois at Springfield, added the University of Minnesota Crookston as its 10th member. The NCLC is designed to assist universities in implementing high quality, large-scale online and blended learning programs.

== Campus ==
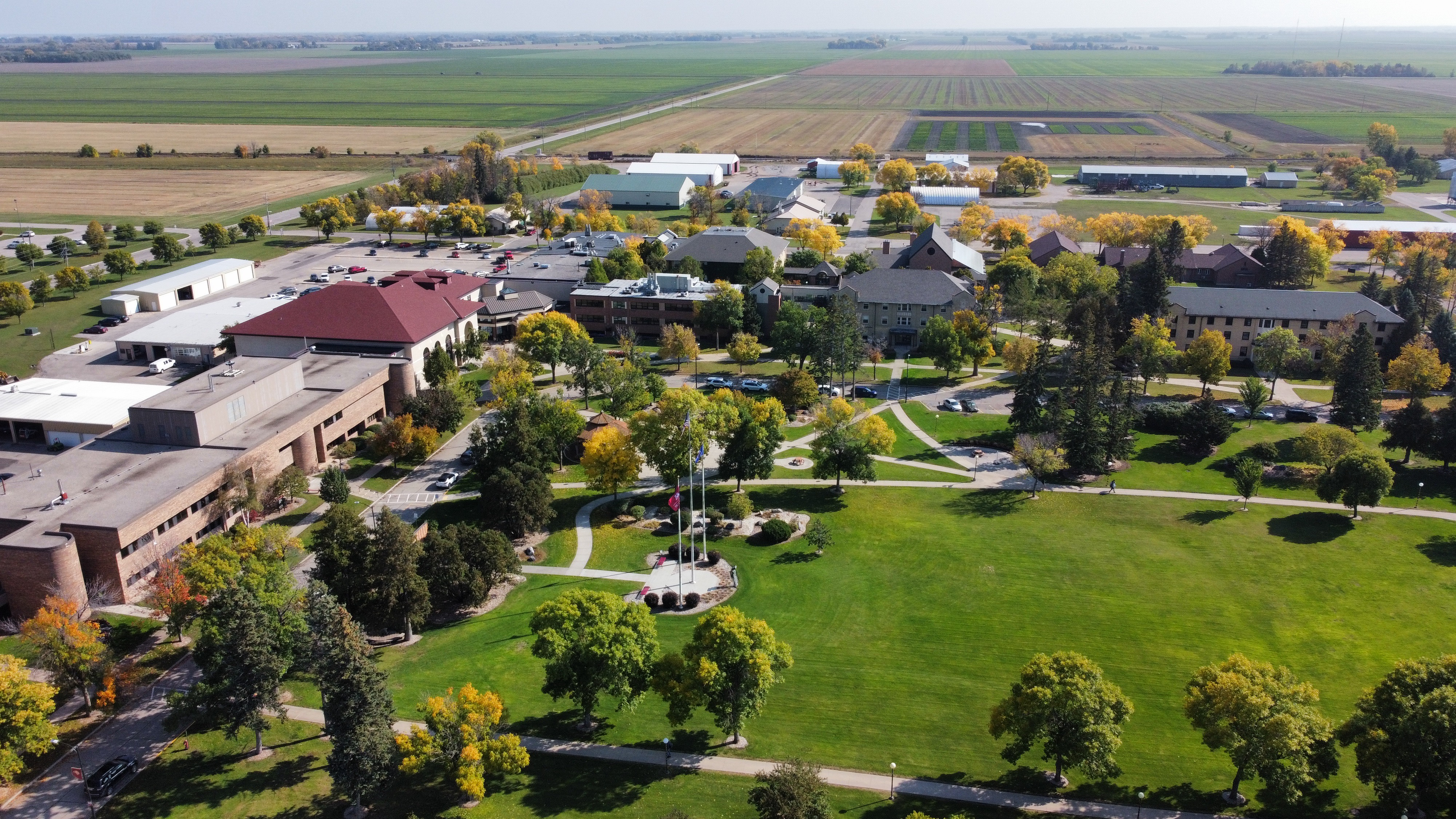
Aerial view of the UMC campus in 2023

The 108-acre (44 ha) campus is located on the northern edge of the city of Crookston. Including the research plots for the Northwest Research and Outreach Center gives a 237 acre total. The campus itself includes fine specimens of numerous tree species, as well as flower gardens bordering a spacious mall. Less than a mile away lies a natural history area that contains a rare fragment of virgin prairie land with native grasses.

Facilities built or renovated within the last 20 years include a student wellness center (2016), three new residence halls (2006, 2009, 2013), an immersive computer visualization and informatics lab (2010), various biology and chemistry labs (2010 and 2012), the centrally located Sargeant Student Center (2005), renovated Kiehle Building (2002), an indoor animal science facility with an equine arena and stables (1993 with addition in 1998), a recreational and athletic complex, a horticulture complex (1997), an early childhood education center (1999), and a controlled environmental laboratory facility (1998).

In July 2016 construction was completed on a $15 million wellness center adjacent to the current UMN Crookston Sports Center. Intended to offer students opportunities to engage in many activities involved with wellness, this new facility features a two-court gymnasium, a suspended walking and running track, a multipurpose room with fitness-on-demand equipment, a classroom, and areas with both cardio and strength training machines.

In addition to facilities dedicated to its undergraduate educational mission, the Crookston campus is home to a variety of partner organizations and agencies, most of which are affiliated with the University of Minnesota system:

- The Northwest Research and Outreach Center acquires, interprets and disseminates research knowledge for agricultural and other constituencies.
- University of Minnesota Extension, Crookston Regional Center delivers educational programs to residents and communities.
- The EDA Center for Minnesota is one of more than 40 university centers nationwide supported by the Economic Development Administration, U.S. Department of Commerce. It conducts applied research, provides direct technical assistance, and delivers educational programs to economic development agencies that support the economy of rural communities throughout Minnesota.
- The Center for Rural Entrepreneurial Studies (CRES), established with a grant from the U.S. Department of Education in the fall of 2010, engages students, faculty, and research facilities on the Crookston campus to nurture the entrepreneurial culture and strengthen the economic vitality of Northwest Minnesota.
- The Northwest Regional Partnership for Sustainable Development connects regional and University resources to develop a sustainable future for the region.
- The Agricultural Utilization Research Institute (AURI), a public non-profit corporation, develops new uses and new markets for agricultural products.
- Northwest Educational Technology System (NETS) is a coalition of regional higher education institutions employing communications technology to foster cooperation, communication, efficiency, and access.
- Valley Technology Park, operated by the City of Crookston, is a small business incubation facility just north of campus.
- The Retired Senior Volunteer Program (RSVP) matches the skills and experiences of volunteer retirees to community needs.
- The 85-acre Red River Valley Natural History Area (containing prairie, marshes, and forests) is located near campus and is used extensively for practice in conservation techniques and nature observation.

== Athletics ==
The Minnesota–Crookston (UMC) athletic teams are called the Golden Eagles. The university is a member of the NCAA Division II ranks, primarily competing in the Northern Sun Intercollegiate Conference (NSIC) since the 1999–2000 academic year. The mascot is a golden eagle named "Regal".

UMC competes in 12 intercollegiate varsity sports: Men's sports include baseball, basketball, cross country and golf; while women's sports include basketball, cross country, equestrian (Hunt Seat and Western), golf, soccer, softball, tennis and volleyball. Club sports include men's ice hockey and co-ed trap shooting. Football was a sponsored sport until after the 2019 fall season (2019–20 school year), when they decided to drop the program.

== Administration ==
The University of Minnesota Crookston is governed by policies established by the University of Minnesota Board of Regents. The president of the University of Minnesota provides oversight to the chancellor at the UMN Crookston. The vice chancellor for academic affairs oversees the four academic departments with leadership in each area provided by a department head. The associate vice chancellor for student affairs and enrollment management oversees most student support units. For more detail, review the organizational chart.

== Student organizations ==
There are approximately 40 student clubs and organizations for students to join. The Crookston Student Association (CSA) is the student governing body.

== Notable alumni ==
- Michael Chowdry, founder of Atlas Air
- Jim LeClair, professional football player
- Ed Widseth, professional football player

== See also ==
- List of colleges and universities in Minnesota
- Higher education in Minnesota
