= Aftab Ahmed Gujjar =

Pakistani lawyer

Aftab Ahmed Gujjar (April 16, 1957 – May 9, 2009) was an advocate of the Supreme Court of Pakistan. He died on the 9th of May in 2009 at the age of 52.
