= Hasina Bari Chowdhury =

Bangladeshi politician (born 1964)

- হাছিনা বারী চৌধুরী

Member of the Bangladesh Parliament for Reserved women's seat-31
- In office 28 February 2024 – 6 August 2024
- Preceded by: Rabeya Alim

Personal details
- Born: 4 September 1964 (age 61)
- Party: Bangladesh Awami League

Hasina Bari Chowdhury (born 4 September 1964) is a Awami League politician and a former Jatiya Sangsad member from a women's reserved for Dhaka District. She was the reserved women ward councilor one of Dhaka North City Corporation. She was the general secretary of Dhaka Metropolitan North unit of the Bangladesh Mohila Awami League.
