= Chowdhury Motahar Hossain =

Bangladeshi politician

Member of Bangladesh Parliament
- In office 1979–1986

Personal details
- Political party: Bangladesh Nationalist Party

Chowdhury Motahar Hossain (Bengali: চৌধুরী মোতাহার হোসেন) is a Bangladesh Nationalist Party politician and a former member of parliament for Rajshahi-9.

== Career ==
Hossain was elected to parliament from Rajshahi-9 as a Bangladesh Nationalist Party candidate in 1979.
