= Nirupa Chaudhari =

American biologist

Nirupa Chaudhari is an American biologist who has shown that human and animal tongues have special receptors that respond to umami, the fifth taste. Chaudhari is a researcher at the University of Miami.
