= Ram Chet Chaudhary =

Indian agricultural scientist

Ram Chet Chaudhary is an Indian agricultural scientist and a 2024 Padma Shri Awardee.

Born on 8 November 1944, Chaudhary received his B.Sc. Ag degree from the Deen Dayal Upadhyay, Gorakhpur University in 1963, M.Sc. Ag. in 1965 from then Government Agriculture College, Kanpur, and Ph.D. in agricultural botany from Agra University. His Ph.D. thesis work was completed at CSIR – National Botanical Research Institute, Lucknow. He received his postdoctorate from the Technical University of Munich.

After receiving his Ph.D. degree in 1969, Chaudhary served as assistant professor in G.B. Pant University of Agriculture & Technology, Pantnagar, associate professor in Plant Breeding Department, and associate director of Crops Research Centre. After that he served as chief scientist, rice director in Dr. Rajendra Prasad Central Agricultural University, Pusa (Bihar). Following this he worked as rice specialist in the World Bank in Nigeria followed by 10 years as plant breeder and INGER global coordinator of International Rice Research Institute (IRRI). Chaudhary's last formal job was with the FAO in various countries of Asia, Middle East, and Africa through which he contributed for the welfare of mankind relating to food and health in more than 40 countries of the world. Dr Chaudhary is all set to appear for Sanely Spoken, a podcast wing of Sanely Written.

== Publication ==
Until September 2024, he has produced more than 390 publications, including 58 books and bulletins. His ICAR Award-winning books in plant breeding are the textbooks in agricultural universities. His 244 research papers have been published in national and international journals. Currently, he is on the advisory board of several universities. DDU University Gorakhpur has put him as mentor of the Institute of Agriculture and natural Sciences, and also instituted "Dr. Ram Chet Chaudhary Gold Medal" for the top PG student in agriculture. He is the member of 17 national and international scientific societies.

Chaudhary's works on agriculture have been published across the world and form part of the curriculum in many Indian agriculture universities. He has studied the production of rice and other crops in Nigeria, the Philippines, Indonesia, Cambodia, Myanmar, as well as India. He has written a textbook on plant breeding by the name Introductory principles of Plant Breeding, published by Oxford University Press in 1982 and reprinted four times through 1993, and a comprehensive work on rice varieties, published by FAO in 2001.

He founded on 8 September 1998, and is chairman of, the Participatory Rural Development Foundation (PRDF). Formerly he was the coordinator of the International Network for the Genetic Evaluation of Rice (INGER).

== Awards and recognition ==
- Dr. Rajendra Prasad Award (1974): Awarded for his work in developing superior rice varieties in Uttar Pradesh.
- Distinguished Collaboration Award (2000): Conferred by the Cambodian Prime Minister Hun Sen for his contributions to rice research.
- Fellow of ISPGR (2017): Awarded by Dr M.S. Swaminathan, Dr R.S. Paroda and other dignitaries.
- Karm Ratna Award (2018): Given by Indo-Nepal Samrasta Organization for his work in agricultural development (PRDF) in the Presence of K.P. Sharma Oly, the Prime Minister of Nepal.
- Padma Shri Award (2024): Dr Chaudhary was honoured by the Government of India for his work in the field of science and engineering, particularly his contribution to agricultural advancements and the promotion of Kala Namak rice.
