= Tahir Mahmood Chahal =

Pakistani politician

Chaudhry Tahir Mahmood Chahal Jatt چوہدری طاھر محمود چاھل جٹ

Voice Chairman of UC-252 Halloki
- In office 7 June 2013 – Incumbent

Member of Parliament for NA-129
- In office 9 Nov 1990 – 8 Jul 1993

Personal details
- Born: 20 April 1949 (age 77) Lahore, Punjab, Pakistan
- Party: PML (Pakistan)
- Relatives: Ch Zahid Mahmood Chahal Jatt (brother)
- Education: Govt High School Halloki Lahore
- Profession: Agriculture

Ch Tahir Mahmood Chahal Jatt (چوہدری طاھر محمود چاھل جٹ: born 20 April 1984 in Lahore) is a prominent local politician. Chaudhary Tahir Mahmood Chahal Jatt S/O Ch Allah Deta Chahal Jatt FROM Nanger Sharif Railway Station Kana Kachha LAHORE. NA-129, PP-160 UC 252.

== Political career ==
He started his political career from Lahore as a student activist. Later on he was elected Nominative Voice Chairman of UC-252 Halloki From Nanger Sharif/ Railway Station Kana Kachha LAHORE NA-129, PP-160.

Chaudhry Tahir Mahmood Chahal Jatt is married and has two daughters.

Political offices
Preceded by Rana Mubshir Iqbal	MNA NA-129; 2011–Present	Incumbent
