= Michael Chowdry =

Pakistani-American businessman

- Born: 1954; Dominion of Pakistan
- Died: January 24, 2001 (aged 46–47); Watkins, Colorado, U.S.
- Education: University of Minnesota Crookston
- Occupations: Businessman, pilot
- Organization: Atlas Air
- Spouse: Linda Chowdry
- Relatives: Chowdry Ghais Akbar Buttar (father)

Michael A. Chowdry (1954 – January 24, 2001) was a Pakistani-American businessman who became the founder of American-based cargo carrier Atlas Air in 1992. He was on the Forbes 400 list with a net worth of $920 million, ranked among the richest American businessmen of Pakistani heritage before his death in a plane crash in 2001.

== Early life and education ==
Born in Pakistan in a Muslim Punjabi family, Chowdry emigrated to England aged 15. He was a son of Chowdry Ghais Akbar Buttar, a retired army officer and grandson of Chowdry Mohammad Akbar Buttar; a government bureaucrat. In 1976, he moved to the United States where he graduated from the University of Minnesota Crookston in 1978 with a degree in Agricultural Aviation. He started his aviation career flying crop dusters and selling Piper airplanes to cover his college tuition. He gave flying lessons to farmers, and also worked under a government contract flying Native Americans to the Mayo Clinic from reservations in the Midwest.

== Career ==
Chowdry expanded his business into buying and selling landing rights at constrained airports in the early 1980s. In 1984, he started a company named Aeronautics Leasing, which leased passenger airplanes to major carriers such as Pan American, British Airways and Trans World Airlines. In 1992, Michael Chowdry founded Atlas Air which is based in Purchase, NY, valued around $ 1.39 billion, operates B747s in 46 countries and 101 cities. By 1993, Atlas Air was flying routes to Taipei and Europe, and the company went public in 1997.

=== Plane crash ===
On January 24, 2001, Michael Chowdry died while flying his personal Czech-made Aero L-39 Albatros jet trainer with Jeff Cole, aerospace editor of the Wall Street Journal. The crash occurred in Watkins, Colorado, killing both Chowdry and Cole. He was survived by his wife and two children. His wife Linda in 2021 published the memoir No Man's Son - A Flight from Obscurity to Fame about her late husband.
