= Dabethuwa =

- Village
- Village location on Varanasi district map Dabethuwa (Uttar Pradesh) Dabethuwa (India)
- Coordinates: 25.342560°N 82.694242°E
- Country: India
- State: Uttar Pradesh
- Elevation: 85 m (279 ft)

Population (2011)
  - Total: 757

Languages
  - Official: Hindi
- Time zone: UTC+5:30 (IST)
- Postal code: 221207
- Telephone code: +91-542
- Vehicle registration: UP65 XXXX
- Village code: 209148
- Website: up.gov.in

Dabethuwa is a village in Varanasi tehsil of Varanasi district in the Indian state of Uttar Pradesh. It is about 294 kilometres from the state capital Lucknow and 776 kilometres from the national capital Delhi.

== Demography ==
Dabethuwa has a total population of 757 people amongst 106 families. Sex ratio of Dabethuwa is 897 and child sex ratio is 1,034. Uttar Pradesh state average for both ratios is 912 and 902 respectively^{[note]}.

Details	Male	Female	Total	Comments
Number of houses	–	–	106	(census 2011)
Adult	340	297	637	(census 2011)
Children (0–6 years)	59	61	120	(census 2011)
Total population	399	358	757	(census 2011)
Literacy	89.12%	70.71%	80.53%	(census 2011)

== Transportation ==
Dabethuwa can be accessed by road only as it does not have a railway station. Closest railway station to this village is Bhadohi (23 km). Nearest operational airports are Varanasi airport (38 kilometres) and Allahabad Airports (114 kilometres).

== Notes ==
- All demographic data is based on 2011 Census of India.
