= Matiar Rahman Chowdhury =

Bangladeshi politician

- মতিয়ার রহমান চৌধুরী

Member of Parliament for Rangpur-12
- In office 18 February 1979 – 12 February 1982
- Preceded by: Shamsul Haque Chowdhury
- Succeeded by: Seats abolished

Personal details
- Party: Bangladesh Nationalist Party

Matiar Rahman Chowdhury is a Bangladesh Nationalist Party politician. He was elected a member of parliament for Rangpur-12 in the 1979 Bangladeshi general election.

== Career ==
Matiar Rahman Chowdhury was elected a member of parliament for constituency Rangpur-12 as a Bangladesh Nationalist Party candidate in the 1979 Bangladeshi general election.
