= Chaudhry Abid Jotana =

Pakistani politician

Chaudhry Abid Ashraf Jotana چوہدری عابد اشرف جوتانہ

Personal details
- Born: Sauwal, Pind Dadan Khan, Pakistan

Chaudhry Abid Ashraf Jotana (Urdu: چوہدری عابد اشرف جوتانہ; was born on 13 February 1982 in Pind Dadan Khan Tehsil, Pakistan) in an Arain family. He is a Pakistani politician who has been serving as a member of the Provincial Assembly of the Punjab since August 2002.

== Political career ==
Jotana was elected to the Provincial Assembly of Punjab from the Nazam Tehsil constituency under the Pakistan Muslim League (Q) in the 2002 Pakistani by-elections. On a PML-Q ticket, he reiterated his support for the PAT in 2018.
