= Bangla Mirror =

- Front page on 2 September 2010
- Type: Weekly newspaper
- Format: Tabloid
- Editor: Mohammed Abdul Kaim (Goni)
- Founded: October 2002
- Language: English
- Headquarters: Unit-2, 60 Hanbury Street, Aldgate, London, E1 5JL
- Sister newspapers: Sylhet Mirror
- Website: Official website

The Bangla Mirror (Bengali: বাংলা দর্পন) is a British English-language weekly newspaper marketed to British Bangladeshis. It is owned by the Bangla Mirror Group.

== Content ==
The Bangla Mirror was launched in October 2002. It is based in London and is published every Friday for £0.50 (or for an annual subscription of £35). Its aim is to link members of the British Bangladeshi community to the heritage of their ancestors in Bangladesh. It owned by the Bangla Mirror Group.

The newspaper combines hometown weekly qualities (such as human interest stories, anniversaries, birthdays) with popular major newspapers or magazines features (such as book, movie, television, restaurant, music, stage, politics, health issues, sports, travel, fashion, art, classifieds, memoriam, obituaries).

The newspaper focuses on current events and happenings of interest to the British Bangladeshi community. Including articles on Bangladeshi and British Bangladeshi entertainers, politicians, social organizations, service groups as well as features on Bangladeshi history, articles on Bangladeshi roots, old stories featuring prominent British Bangladeshis, and also community-based celebrations.

The newspaper is read in the United Kingdom, Bangladesh, the United States of America, Sri Lanka, Norway and Iceland. The newspaper is read at the Bangladeshi High Commission in London and by civil service departments in Bangladesh itself.

== See also ==
- List of newspapers in London
