= Pramod Chaudhari =

Indian businessperson

Pramod Chaudhari is founder-chairman of Praj Industries Limited, a process and project engineering company based in Pune a city in Maharashtra state of India. Thought Leaders (2002) includes his biography in 22 visionary Indian managers. Chaudhari has been voted amongst Globally Top 100 People in bio-energy space by Biofuels Digest. He has also been awarded the distinguished alumnus award (2005) and distinguished service award (2015) from IIT Bombay. Praj has won the Forbes 200 Best Under a Billion Company in Asia, twice.
