= Robin Choudhury =

British cardiologist

Robin Choudhury is a British cardiologist, and Professor of Cardiovascular Medicine at the University of Oxford. He is also a Consultant Cardiologist at the John Radcliffe Hospital and a Research Fellow in Biomedical Sciences at Balliol College, Oxford.

== Education ==
He attended Leeds Grammar School and Balliol College, University of Oxford.

== Career and Research ==
Choudhury was a house physician in the Nuffield Department of Medicine at the John Radcliffe Hospital, Oxford. He undertook postgraduate training in London at the Royal Brompton Hospital and Hammersmith Hospital. He won a Wellcome Trust Prize International Fellowship to undertake research at the Mount Sinai School of Medicine, New York City, where he worked with Dr Valentin Fuster and in the laboratory of Dr Edward Fisher.

He returned to Oxford in 2001, where he was a Wellcome Trust Senior Research Fellow in Clinical Science and founding Director of the Acute Vascular Imaging Centre. He has been elected to fellowships of The European Society of Cardiology, the American College of Cardiology and of the Royal College of Physicians (FRCP).

== Clinical expertise ==
His clinical practice is as a coronary interventional cardiologist and he is expert in the management of cholesterol, inflammation and cardiovascular risk. His is a past president of the Royal Society of Medicine Section on Lipids, Metabolism and Vascular Risk. He is an advocate for informed patient choice.

== Publications ==
Choudhury's most notable research has been in the field of cardiovascular disease. Choudhury has contributed to over 250 articles in the scientific literature mostly in the fields of molecular imaging; inflammation in cardiovascular disease; myocardial regeneration; and innate immune programming.

He is co-editor of the Handbook of Cardiology Emergencies (OUP), and contributor to the Oxford Textbook of Medicine (OUP).

In 2013, he led a group that used MRI to test, for the first time in a living subject, the 500-year-old theories of Leonardo da Vinci on the movement of blood across the aortic valve. In 2024, Head of Zeus published The Beating Heart: The Art & Science of Our Most Vital Organ. Apollo Magazine noted that it "charts depictions of the art from ancient ayurvedic texts to Renaissance anatomical diagrams to the Surrealists and beyond".
