= A.K. Golam Jilani =

Bengali revolutionary

A. K. Golam Jilani
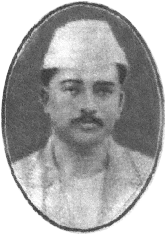
- Born: 24 October 1904; Algichor, Nawabganj Upazila, Dhaka, British India
- Died: 9 February 1932 (aged 27); Dhaka Central Jail, Dhaka, British India
- Resting place: Algichor, Nawabganj Upazila, Dhaka, Bangladesh
- Political party: All Bengal Khilafat Committee; All India Congress Committee (AICC)

A. K. Golam Jilani (24 October 1904 – 9 February 1932) was a Bengali revolutionary of the Indian independence movement from the Nawabganj Upazila, Dhaka in present-day Bangladesh.

== Early life ==
A. K. Golam Jilani was born on 24 October 1904 in the Algichor village of the Nawabganj Upazila of the Dhaka district of British India (Present day India, Pakistan and Bangladesh). His father's name was Golam Muhammad Chowdhury, who was also a revolutionary against the British Raj. Golam Jilani was educated at the National School, where he completed his matriculation. He later went to Patna (capital of the Indian state of Bihar) and passed his B.A. there.

== Indian independence movement ==
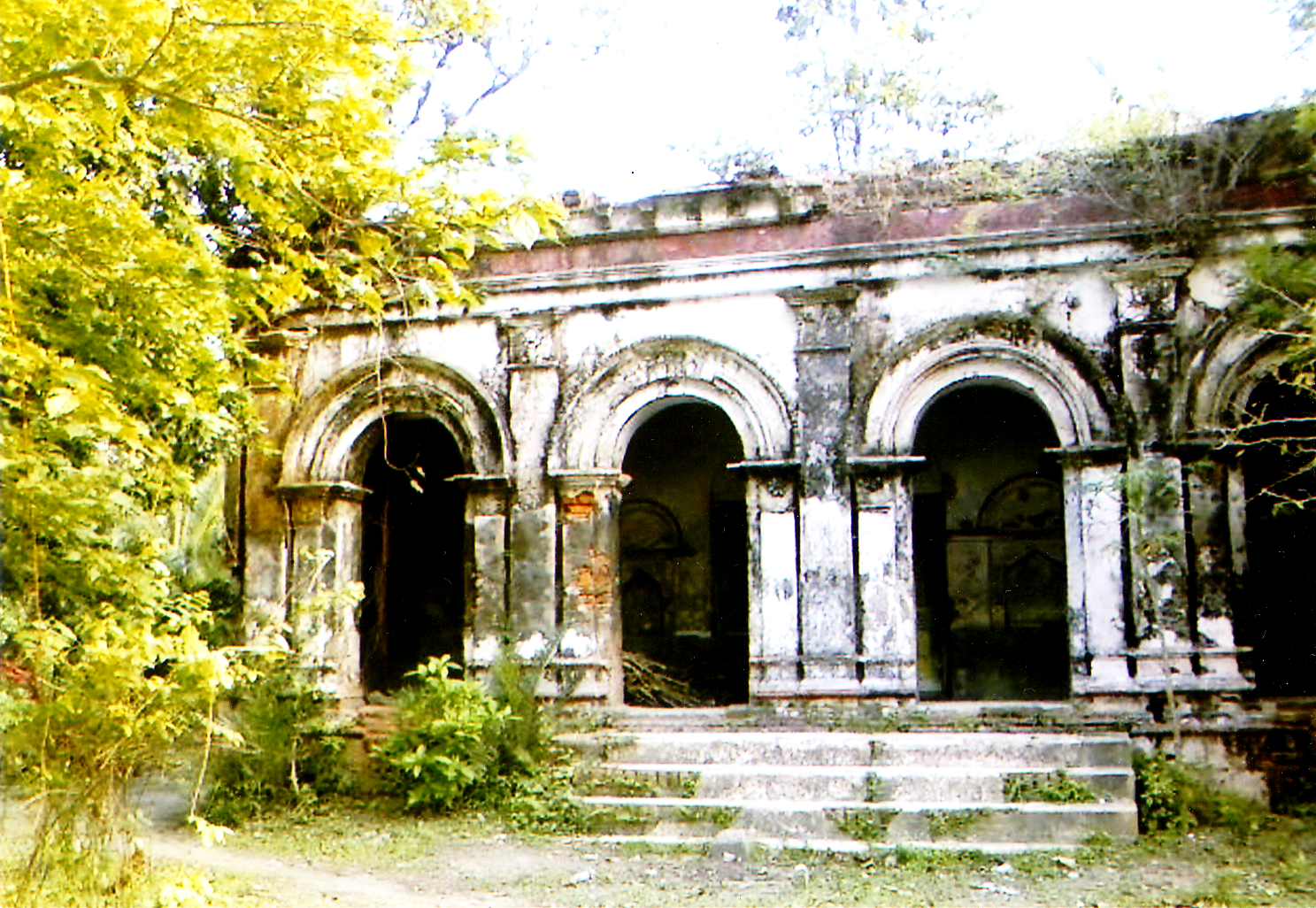
Golam Jilani's house at Algichor village, Nawabganj Upazila, Dhaka Division, Bangladesh. Co-ordinates: 23°39'08"N 90°10'27"E

Golam Jilani got involved in revolutionary activities against the British Raj and fought for the independence of India from Great Britain during his student life. He became the secretary of both All India Congress Committee (AICC) and All Bengal Khilafat Committee at the age of 27. Due to holding extreme anti-British sentiment he even refused to serve as the Deputy Magistrate under the British Government. In the Galimpur village, Golam Jilani and the revolutionary leader Asab Ali Beg called for a meeting where they invited the people to join the revolutionaries against the British Raj for the independence of India from Great Britain. Despite restrictions from the British Raj government, many meetings and conferences took place at Nawabganj for the Indian independence movement, for which many honorable leaders like Satish Chandra Dasgupta, Prafulla Chandra Ghosh, Indra Narayan Dasgupta and Mahatma Gandhi visited Algichor to meet Golam Jilani.

== Arrest and death ==
In a meeting at Nawabganj in 1932, Golam Jilani gave an arousing speech against the British Government, for which he was arrested in the meeting by the police. Jilani was first taken to Algichor to see his mother for the last time and later taken to Dhaka Central Jail for captivity. There he was kept in a dark cold cell. He got weak day by day and suffered from typhoid fever. The British Government sent a recognizance to Golam Jilani's father that if Jilani stops rebelling against the English, then he will be released from jail. Jilani's father, Golam Muhammad Chowdhury, who was also a revolutionary against the British Raj, said that Jilani would die as a Martyr in jail rather than conspiring with the English. In jail, Jilani was tortured by the police even though he was a patient of typhoid fever. On 9 February 1932, heavy rocks were pressed on his chest and he started to bleed from his nose; eventually, he died that day at Dhaka Central Jail.

His body was taken back to his home village at Algichor, where he was buried next to his home. At the time of his death, he left behind his 18-year-old wife, Rowshan Ara, and their two infant children. His wife would die in August 1991 at the age of 77.

== Awards ==
In 1973, Golam Jilani was posthumously awarded the Indian Independence Medal by the government of India.
