= Debabani Choudhury =

Indian-American microwave communications engineer

Debabani Choudhury is an American and Indian microwave communications engineer who is the founder and CEO of SeraTech LLC, a company that works on electromagnetic communications and sensing on frequency ranges from gigahertz to optical.

== Education and career ==
Choudhury completed a Ph.D. in electrical engineering at IIT Bombay in 1991. Her dissertation was Experimental and Finite Element Studies on Monolithic Microwave Integrated Circuit Elements.

After working on space-based communications in the terahertz range at the Jet Propulsion Laboratory, at Millitech Corporation, and at Hughes Research Laboratories, she began working for Intel in 2006. Her work at Intel Labs involved wireless communications and vehicle infrastructure integration. After leaving Intel, she founded SeraTech LLC and became its CEO.

== Recognition ==
Choudhury was elected as an IEEE Fellow in 2011, "for contributions to millimeter wave enabling technologies".
