= Chaudhry Ashfaq Ahmed =

Pakistani politician

Member of the Provincial Assembly of the Punjab
- In office 29 May 2013 – 31 May 2018

Personal details
- Born: 1 January 1967 (age 59) Layyah
- Party: Pakistan Muslim League (Nawaz)

Chaudhry Ashfaq Ahmed is a Pakistani politician who was a Member of the Provincial Assembly of the Punjab, from May 2013 to May 2018.

== Early life and education ==
He was born on 1 January 1967 in Layyah.

He has received matriculation education.

== Political career ==
He was elected to the Provincial Assembly of the Punjab as an independent candidate from Constituency PP-266 (Layyah-V) in the 2013 Pakistani general election. He joined Pakistan Muslim League (N) in May 2013.
