= Iqbal Chaudhri =

Pakistani cricketer

Personal information
- Full name: Mohammad Iqbal Chaudhri
- Died: 2019; Faisalabad, Pakistan
- Batting: Right-handed

Domestic team information
- Years: Team
- 1954–55 to 1959–60: Bahawalpur
- 1961–62 to 1969–70: Sargodha

Career statistics
Competition	First-class
Matches	40
Runs scored	1294
Batting average	21.56
100s/50s	0/8
Top score	72
Balls bowled	324
Wickets	4
Bowling average	37.25
5 wickets in innings	–
10 wickets in match	–
Best bowling	2/81
Catches/stumpings	24/–
- Source: CricketArchive, 21 October 2017

Mohammad Iqbal Chaudhri (died 2019) was a cricketer who played first-class cricket in Pakistan from 1955 to 1969.

A middle-order batsman and occasional bowler and wicketkeeper, Iqbal Chaudhri was the leading scorer in the 1957–58 Quaid-e-Azam Trophy. He scored 392 runs at an average of 56.00, helping Bahawalpur to win the trophy. In the final, he scored 51 and 38 in Bahawalpur's victory over Karachi C.

The rest of his career was only moderately successful. He moved to Sargodha for the 1961–62 season. He made his highest score in his final match, a draw against Multan in 1969–70, when he made 72, which was also the highest score in the match.
