= Urvashi Chaudhary =

Indian actress and model

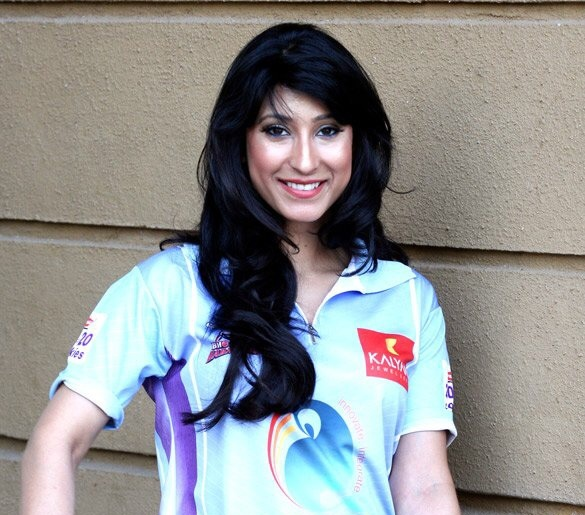
- CCL's brand ambassador Urvashi Chaudhary shoots in cricket costume
- Born: Jammu and Kashmir, India
- Occupations: Actress, supermodel
- Years active: 2009 to till date

Urvashi Chaudhary is an Indian actress, model, and brand ambassador of Bhojpuri Dabangg CCL 3. She is known for her role as Shaina in the 2009 film, Trump Card. The film stars Vishwajeet Pradhan, Vikram Kumar, Haidar Ali and Urvashi Chaudhary.

== Early life ==
Urvashi was born and raised in the state of Jammu and Kashmir.

== Career ==
She began her modelling career after her tenth-grade examinations in Chandigarh. She has acted in three Bollywood movies to date, most notably as the main lead in the movie Trump Card.

== Filmography ==
- Ishq Na Karna (2006)
- Trump Card (2009) as Shaina
- Kaho Na Kaho (2011) as Roshni
