= Chaudhry Ashraf Ali Ansari =

Pakistani politician

Member of the Provincial Assembly of the Punjab
- In office 15 August 2018 – 14 January 2023
- Constituency: PP-57 Gujranwala-VII
- In office 29 May 2013 – 31 May 2018

Personal details
- Born: 15 September 1969 (age 57) Sheikhupura, Punjab, Pakistan
- Party: TLP (2025-present)
- Other political affiliations: PMLN (2013–2025)

Chaudhry Ashraf Ali Ansari is a Pakistani politician who had been a Member of the Provincial Assembly of the Punjab from August 2018 till January 2023. Previously, he was a Member of the Provincial Assembly of the Punjab, from May 2013 to May 2018.

== Early life and education ==
He was born on 15 September 1969 in Sheikhupura.

He has a degree of Bachelor of Science which he obtained in 1992 from University of the Punjab.

== Political career ==
He was elected to the Provincial Assembly of the Punjab as a candidate of Pakistan Muslim League (Nawaz) (PML-N) from Constituency PP-93 (Gujranwala-III) in the 2013 Pakistani general election.

He was re-elected to Provincial Assembly of the Punjab as a candidate of PML-N from Constituency PP-57 (Gujranwala-VII) in the 2018 Pakistani general election.
