= Rajendra Chaudhary (born 1955) =

Indian politician

Rajendra Choudhary

Member of the Rajasthan Legislative Assembly
- In office 1985–1990
- Preceded by: Ramnarayan Dudi
- Succeeded by: Mishri Lal Choudhary
- Constituency: Bilara, Pali
- In office 1993–2003
- Preceded by: Mishri Lal Choudhary
- Succeeded by: Ramnarayan Dudi
- Constituency: Bilara, Pali

Personal details
- Born: 25 August 1955 (age 71) Jodhpur, Rajasthan, India
- Party: Indian National Congress
- Spouse: Vimlesh Chaudhary
- Children: 2
- Education: Bachelor of Laws; Master of Arts

Rajendra Choudhary (born 25 August 1955) is an Indian politician who served as a state minister in the Government of Rajasthan. A member of the Indian National Congress, he was elected to the Rajasthan Legislative Assembly for three terms from the Bilara constituency in Pali.
