= Nilesh Chaudhary =

Indian cricketer

Nilesh Chaudhary (born 20 June 1983) is an Indian former cricketer. He is a left-handed batsman and slow left-arm bowler who played for Gujarat. He was born in Surat.

Chaudhary made a single first-class appearance for Gujarat, during the 2007–08 season, against Services. He bowled 12 overs in the match, taking a single wicket. He scored a duck in the only innings in which he batted, as Gujarat won the match by an innings margin.
