= Shufti Chaudhri =

Pakistani military officer (1920–2015)

Lieutenant Colonel Iftikhar Ahmad Chaudhri MC
- افتخار احمد چوہدری
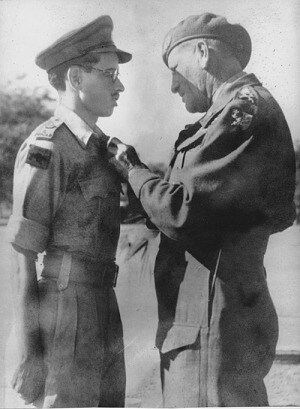
- Field Marshal Auchinleck pins the Military Cross on Shufti (1944)

Personal details
- Born: 8 January 1920 Gujrat, British Raj
- Died: 2 June 2015 (aged 95) Lahore, Pakistan
- Spouse: Farkhanda Akhtar (m. 1945)
- Children: 5
- Education: Aligarh Muslim University; Government College, Lahore; Staff College, Quetta

Military service
- Branch/service: British Indian Army (1942–1947); Pakistan Army (1947–1968)
- Years of service: 1942–1968
- Rank: Lieutenant Colonel
- Battles/wars: World War II; Second Battle of El Alamein; Battle of Wadi Akarit; Italian campaign; Indo-Pakistani War of 1965; Operation Gibraltar
- Awards: Military Cross (1944)

Iftikhar Ahmad Chaudhri (Note: Urdu: افتخار احمد چوہدری) (8 January 1920 – 2 June 2015) better known as Shufti, was a Pakistan Army officer with prior service in the British Indian Army, who served as an intelligence officer during the Italian campaign (World War II).

Awarded the Military Cross in June 1944, Chaudhri displayed exemplary leadership in January of that year. While serving near Arielli, a village south of Pescara, he braved intense enemy attacks, including locating missing personnel, leading his men against the Germans at close range, and orchestrating a successful withdrawal under heavy fire. Chaudhri's actions described in the citation for the Immediate MC, showcased the finest traditions of Indian fighting men.

== Early life and family ==
Iftikhar Ahmad Chaudhri was born on 8 January 1920 in Kharian, British India, to Chaudhri Fazal Ahmad, a tehsildar from Jalalpur Jattan. Iftikhar belonged to a prominent Warraich Jat family of Gujrat district. He attended the Aligarh Muslim University and in 1941, he graduated from Government College, Lahore.

He married Farkhanda Akhtar in 1945, they had four sons and a daughter. Farkhanda passed away sometime before Chaudhri.

== Military career ==
Chaudhri in the 1940s

He enlisted into the British Indian Army and completed officer training in Bangalore. He was commissioned into the 4th Battalion, 16th Punjab Regiment in 1942. He saw action during the Italian campaign towards the end of the war for which he was awarded the British Military Cross.

After doing staff course at Staff College, Quetta, he was posted GSO Grade 1 of Military Operations to GHQ, Rawalpindi.

Additionally, he wrote a paper on the defence of the Middle East against Soviet aggression. The paper was discussed at the SEATO Military Advisors Conference in Melbourne, Australia. The report was well received by the Ministry of Defence Main Building in London.

Chaudhri opted for Pakistan after the Partition of British India in 1947 and transferred his service to the Pakistan Army. He served in Baghdad as military attaché from 1961 to 1964 and during the Indo-Pakistani War of 1965, he became Assistant Adjutant Quartermaster general for his division in Kashmir. He retired in 1968.

== Later life and death ==
After retiring, he setup a successful trading company. He resided in Lahore, Pakistan and died on 2 June 2015.
