= Arknath Chaudhary =

Indian scholar of Sanskrit

Arknath Chaudhary is an Indian scholar of Sanskrit. He served Central Sanskrit University as Director and Shree Somnath Sanskrit University, Veraval, Gujarat as Vice-Chancellor.

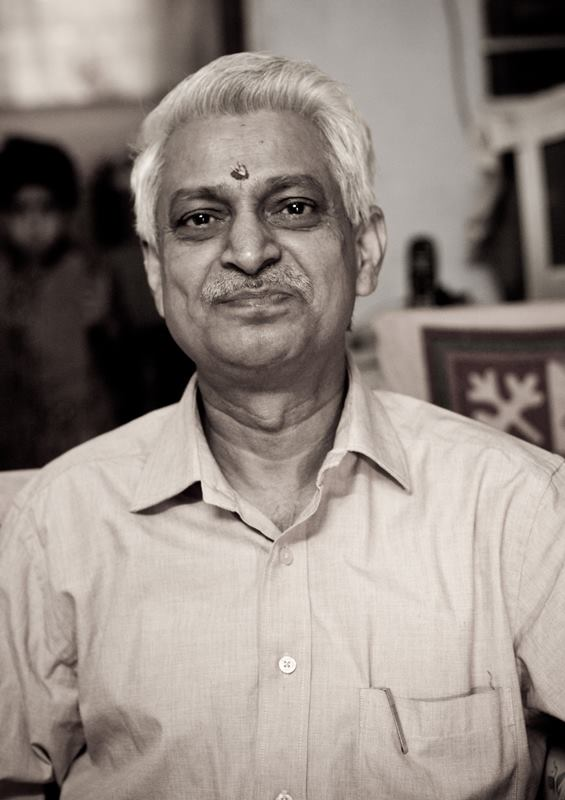
Professor Arknath Chaudhary

== Career ==
Chaudhary is a specialist in Sanskrit Vyakaran.

He served three campuses of Rashtriya Sanskrit Sansthan as Principal.

Chaudhary comes from Rudrapur village in the Madhubani district of Bihar state in India. He served several organizations in Jharkhand, Andhra Pradesha, Himachal Pradesh, Punjab, Maharasthra, Gujarat and Rajasthan.

Chaudhary spent a lengthy tenure with Rasthriya Sanskrit Sansthan, Jaipur where he joined as lecturer and was promoted to Professor and Principal. He was given charge of Rashtriya Sanskrit Sansthan, Mumbai and Rashtriya Sanskrit Sansthan, Lucknow later. He organized the biggest Sanskrit conference in association with the Ministry of HRD, Govt. of India.

== Education ==
Chaudhary is an Acharya in Vyakararan and MA in Darshan Shashtra. He was university topper in Darshan Shashtra.

== Publications ==
He has written over 21 books filling more than 8,000 pages, and published 35 research papers on the subjects of Vyakaran, Sahitya, Darshan, Tantra and Ved.

Some of the popular titles published by Dr. Chaudhary are:

- Laghu Siddhant Kaumudi vyakhya
- Madhya Siddhant Kaumudi vyakhya
- Vaiyakaran Kaumudi vyakhya
- Meghadootam (Translation)
- Nitishatakam
- Tarkbhasha
- Tarksangrah
- Lalita Sahasranamw
- Nighantu Shabdkosh

== Awards and recognition ==
- Sanskrit Shiksha, awarded by Governor of Rajasthan, on behalf of MHRD, Govt. of Rajasthan in July 2012
- Veereshwar Shashtri Vyakaran Samman, awarded by Chief Minister, Rajasthan, on behalf of Rajasthan Sanskrit Academy
- Shiksha Ratna Award, awarded by Governor of Gujarat, on behalf of Akashdeep Group of Schools and Colleges
- Shashtra Mahodadhi Award, by Vedic Sanskriti Sangh, Jaipur
- Nimbark Sanskriti Award, awarded by Education Minister, Govt. of Rajasthan, on behalf of Hariseva Sanskrit Samiti, Bhilwara
