= Navila Chowdhury =

Bangladeshi politician

Member of Bangladesh Parliament
- In office 2005–2006

Personal details
- Political party: Bangladesh Nationalist Party

Navila Chowdhury is a Bangladesh Jatiya Party politician and a former member of the Bangladesh Parliament from a reserved seat.

== Career ==
Chowdhury was elected to parliament from a reserved seat as a Bangladesh Jatiya Party candidate in 2005.
