= Chaudhry Muhammad Shafique =

Pakistani politician

Member of the Provincial Assembly of the Punjab
- In office 15 August 2018 – 14 January 2023
- Constituency: PP-263 Rahim Yar Khan-IX
- In office 2002 – 31 May 2013

Personal details
- Born: 3 July 1952 (age 74) Sadiqabad, Punjab, Pakistan
- Other political affiliations: PML-N (2018-2023)

Chaudhry Muhammad Shafique is a Pakistani politician who is a Member of the Provincial Assembly of the Punjab, from 2002 to 2023. He remains Member of Provincial Assembly four times. He serves his people from "Awami Secretariat Sadiqabad".

== Early life and education ==
He was born on 3 July 1952 in Sadiqabad, Punjab in famous Chaudhry Arain family.

He graduated in 1973 from Government Degree College, Faisalabad .

== Political career ==
He was elected to the Provincial Assembly of the Punjab as a candidate of Pakistan Muslim League (N) (PML-N) from Constituency PP-296 (Rahimyar Khan-XII) in the 2002 Pakistani general election.

He was re-elected to the Provincial Assembly of the Punjab as a candidate of PML-N from Constituency PP-296 (Rahimyar Khan-XII) in the 2008 Pakistani general election.

He was re-elected to the Provincial Assembly of the Punjab as a candidate of PML-N from Constituency PP-296 (Rahimyar Khan-XII) in the 2013 Pakistani general election. In June 2013, he was inducted into the provincial cabinet of Chief Minister Shahbaz Sharif and was made Provincial Minister of Punjab for Industries, Commerce and Investment. In a cabinet reshuffle in November 2016, he was made Provincial Minister of Punjab for Special Education.

He was re-elected to Provincial Assembly of the Punjab as a candidate of PML-N from Constituency PP-267 (Rahim Yar Khan-XIII) in the 2018 Pakistani general election.
