= Abeda Chowdhury =

Bangladeshi politician

Member of Bangladesh Parliament
- In office 1973–1975
- In office 2005–2006

Personal details
- Party: Bangladesh Nationalist Party
- Other political affiliations: Bangladesh Awami League

Abeda Chowdhury is a Bangladesh Nationalist Party politician and a former member of the Bangladesh Parliament from a reserved seat.

== Career ==
Chowdhury was elected to parliament from a reserved seat as a Bangladesh Awami League candidate in 1973.

She was elected to parliament from a reserved seat as a Bangladesh Nationalist Party candidate in 2005.
