= Niaz Ahmad Chaudhry =

Pakistani horticulturalist

Niaz Ahmad Chaudhry نیاز احمد چوہدری
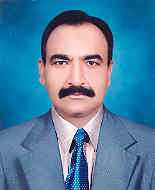
- Born: 15 December 1949; Jhang
- Awards: Norman Borlaug
- Scientific career
- Fields: Horticulture
- Institutions: GOP

Niaz Ahmad Chaudhry born in 1949 in District Jhang (Punjab, Pakistan). He completed his M.Sc. (Hons) in 1974 in the field of Horticulture. After serving for three years in different organizations he joined Punjab agriculture research in the horticulture group in 1976. He served in several research stations and institutions and conducted research on various fruit crops such as Mango, Date, Citrus etc. The research conducted during his service was got published in national research journals.

== Achievements ==
Niaz Ahmad Chaudhry, Conducted research on different fruit crops. Spent more than 20 years on citrus Research. According to the Pakistan Agricultural Research Council (PARC) his major contributions in national and international agriculture includes:

- Introduced a new method of pollinating Dates and invented a Hand Date Pollinator. On this, he has been given the Governor's Award.
- Introduced new citrus varieties of grapefruit, mandarin, and sweet oranges.
- A new dwarf rootstock flying dragon evaluated to overcome bud union crease in musambi.
- To overcome bud union crease in musambi a new grafting technique i.e. double grafting i.e. use of inter stock was introduced.
- Discovered a seedless kinnow Mutant while posted at Director CRI Sargodha.
- Established new Horticulture Research Station DG Khan, Research sub station Bahawalpur, CRS & Citrus Research Institute at Sargodha.

He received Norman Borlaug Award in 2008 in recognition of services in citriculture. All Pakistan Fruits and Vegetable Exporters Association and Citrus Growers Association awarded shields and certificates in recognition of the invention of seedless kinnow. Has 78 research publications on different aspects of citrus production published in reputed journals. Worked as Horticulturist, Principal Scientific officer/Project Director and Director at various Research stations.
