= Mina Zaman Chowdhury =

Bangladeshi politician

Member of Bangladesh Parliament
- In office 1986–1988

Personal details
- Died: 22 February 2016
- Party: Jatiya Party (Ershad)

Mina Zaman Chowdhury (Bengali: মীনা জামান) is a Jatiya Party (Ershad) politician and a former member of the Bangladesh Parliament from a reserved women's seat.

== Early life ==
Chowdhury was born to Khan Bahadur Abdur Rahim Choudhury and Zobeda Rahim Choudhury. She was married to the former chairman of Rajshahi Division Education Board, Shamsuzzaman Chowdhury.

== Career ==
Zaman was elected to parliament from a reserved women's seat as a Jatiya Party candidate in 1986. She founded Jalalabad Hostoshilpo Shongstha, Monjuri Prokashoni, and Ladies' Association, Rajshahi.

== Death ==
Zaman died on 22 February 2016.
