= Golam Mohiuddin Chowdhury =

Golam Mohiuddin Chowdhury FCPS
- Military career
- Allegiance: Bangladesh
- Branch: Bangladesh Army
- Service years: 1989–2021
- Rank: Major General
- Unit: Army Dental Corps
- Commands: Head(Dentistry) of CMH, Dhaka; Head(Dentistry) of Army Medical College, Chittagong; Commandant of CMH, Rangpur; Head(Dentistry) of AFMC; Director General of Directorate General of Medical Service

Golam Mohiuddin Chowdhury is a retired major general of the Bangladesh Army.

== Early life ==
Chowdhury graduated from Dhaka Dental College in 1982 with a Bachelor of Dental Surgery. He studied oral and maxillofacial surgery at the Armed Forces Institute of Dentistry in Pakistan.

== Career ==
Chowdhury joined the Bangladesh Army as an oral and maxillofacial surgeon in 1989.

Chowdhury finished his Fellow of the College of Physicians & Surgeons (FCPS) on 1 July 2007. He was stationed at the Combined Military Hospital in Dhaka. He retired from service in 2021.

Chowdhury also works as a consultant at Evercare Hospital Dhaka. Detective Branch detained him on 30 September 2026, over an attach on New Gini Properties, which also housed the studio of Salman Muqtadir.
