= Sailabala Women's College, Cuttack =

Coordinates: 20.477383°N 85.863503°E

Shailabala Women's College
- Type: Government
- Established: 1913
- Affiliations: UGC
- Academic affiliations: Utkal University, CHSE
- Principal: Dr. Gayatri Biswal
- Location: Cuttack, Odisha, India
- Campus: Madhusudan Road, Cuttack
- Website: shailabalawomenscollege.ac.in

Shailabala Women's College (also known as S.B. Women's College) is a state run postgraduate, undergraduate and junior +2 women's government college on Madhusudan road in Cuttack, India. It is the first women's college of Odisha.

It was named after Shailabala Das who donated her home as a college building to run intermediate and degree courses. She was known for her notable deeds on contribution towards women's uplift in education and social activities in Odisha. She was daughter of the great political leader Madhusudan Das who bought social and industrial development in Odisha during British Raj in India and is known for Utkal Divas.

The postgraduate degree master of arts (M.A) include courses on Home Science, History and Sanskrit. The undergraduate degree include Science (B.Sc) and Arts (B.A). The college is maintained by Department of Higher Education, Odisha and is affiliated to run its undergraduate and postgraduate course curriculum under Utkal University and for class 11th and 12th science, arts and some vocational courses under Council of Higher Secondary Education, Odisha.

Dr. Gayatri Biswal is the principal.

== Notable alumni ==
- Jayanti Patnaik
- Prabhat Nalini Das
- Barsha Priyadarshini
- Aparajita Choudhury (Vice chancellor R.D. Women's university)
