= Sudhanshubala Hazra =

19th-century Indian lawyer and activist

- Occupations: Lawyer, Educator
- Known for: Fighting for women's rights to enroll as lawyers in India
- Parent: Ambika Charan Hazra (father)

Sudhanshubala Hazra was an Indian lawyer, who fought a notable case and campaign to enable women in India to enroll as lawyers. She was the adopted daughter of Madhusudhan Das, a lawyer, politician, and Indian independence movement leader, and the sister of noted educator and politician Sailabala Das.

== Life ==
Sudhanshubala Hazra's parents were Bengali Christians. Her father, Ambika Charan Hazra, was a friend of Madhusudan Das, a lawyer, politician, and Indian independence movement leader. Hazra's daughters, Sudhanshubala and Sailabala, were adopted by Das after Hazra's death.

== Career ==
Hazra initially began her career as a teacher, becoming the headmistress at Ravenshaw Girls' School in Cuttack while attending evening classes to earn her law degree. In 1917, she applied to sit for the Bachelor of Law exam at Calcutta University, which had previously allowed Regina Guha and Hannah Sen to sit the exam and earn their Bachelors in Law. She was not permitted to do so as she had not studied in Calcutta, and her application was transferred back to Patna University, which also declined to allow her to sit the exam. In 1919, she was ultimately permitted to sit the exams in Calcutta University, and she qualified in 1920.

In 1921, Hazra filed a petition before the Patna High Court, seeking permission to be enrolled as a lawyer under the Legal Practitioners Act 1879. A previous petition filed by Regina Guha in the Calcutta High Court on similar grounds had failed. Meanwhile, the Allahabad High Court had differed on this, allowing Cornelia Sorabji to enroll as an advocate. Hazra cited the example of Sorabji, as well as the recently enacted British Sex Disqualification (Removal) Act 1919, to persuade the court to allow her to enrol. However, the Patna High Court ruled in In Re Miss Sudhansu Bala Hazra that they were bound by the Calcutta High Court's reasoning, and the term 'person' in the Legal Practitioner Act did not include a "female". They accordingly barred her from enrolling.

Hazra's sister and father, Sailabala Das and Madhusudhan Das, and lawyer and writer, Hari Singh Gour assisted her in initiating a campaign to allow women to enroll as lawyers, beginning with a successful petition to the Privy Council. In 1923, the Legal Practitioners (Women) Act was passed and Hazra enrolled as a lawyer in Patna. Hazra later published a memoir of her life, titled Woman at Law.

== Additional Reading ==
- In Re Miss Sudhansu Bala Hazra, 64 Indian Cases 636 (1921)
