= Rama Devi =

Rama Devi or Ramadevi may refer to:

- Rama Devi (Orissa politician) or Ramadevi Choudhury (1889–1985), Indian freedom fighter and social reformer, female leader of the nationalists in Orissa
  - Rama Devi Women's University, public women's university in Bhubaneswar, Odisha, India
- Rama Devi (Bihar politician) (born 1965), politician from Bihar
- V. S. Ramadevi (1934–2013), Chief Election Commissioner of India and Governor of Himachal Pradesh

== See also ==
- Ramadeva (disambiguation)
