= Annapurna Maharana =

Odia freedom fighter

Annapurna Choudhury
- Born: Annapurna Choudhury; 3 November 1917; Odisha, India
- Died: 31 December 2012 (aged 95); Cuttack, Orissa Province, British India (now Odisha, India)
- Known for: Freedom fighter, Social Activist
- Spouse: Sharat Chandra Maharana
- Parents: Gopabandhu Choudhury (father); Ramadevi Choudhury (mother)
- Relatives: Gopala Ballabha Das (maternal grandfather); Nabakrushna Choudhuri (uncle)

Annapurna Maharana (née Choudhury 3 November 1917 – 31 December 2012) was an India pro-independence activist active in the Indian independence movement. She was also a prominent social and women's rights activist. Maharana was a close ally of Mahatma Gandhi.

== Personal life ==
Annapurna was born in Orissa Province, British India (now Odisha, India) on 3 November 1917 in an aristocratic Zamindar Karan family, the second child of Ramadevi Choudhury and Gopabandhu Choudhury. Both of her parents were active in the Indian independence movement from the United Kingdom.

== Role during independence ==
Annapurna began actively campaigning for independence when she was fourteen years old, becoming a supporter of Mohandas Gandhi. In 1934, she joined Gandhi on his "Harijan Pada Yatra" march through Odisha from Puri to Bhadrak. Choudhury was arrested several times by British and British Raj, including August 1942 during the Quit India Movement civil disobedience campaign.

Following independence, Annapurna advocated on behalf of women and children in India. She opened a school in Odisha's Rayagada district for the children of the area's tribal population. Annapurna also became involved with the Bhoodan movement, or Land Gift Movement, started by Vinoba Bhave. She further campaigned to integrate the Dacoits active of the Chambal Valley.

During the emergency she protested by helping Ramadevi Choudhury with their newspaper published by the Gram Sevak Press. The newspaper was banned by the government and was arrested along with Ramadevi Choudhury and other leaders from Orissa like Nabakrushna Choudhuri, Harekrushna Mahatab, Manmohan Choudhury, Jaykrushana Mohanty and others.

The Central University of Odisha awarded Annapurna Choudhury an Honoris Causa (honorary degree) in a ceremony held at her Cuttack home on 19 August 2012.

== Death ==
Annapurna Choudhury died of lengthy illnesses related to old age, at her home in Bakharabad, Cuttack, Odisha, at 10:30 p.m. on 31 December 2012, aged 96. Her late husband, Sarat Maharana, died in 2009. She was cremated with honors at the Khannagar crematorium in Cuttack on 2 January 2013.

Governor of Odisha Murlidhar Chandrakant Bhandare and Chief Minister Naveen Patnaik described her death as "irreparable loss" to India and Odisha.
