= List of awards and honours received by Droupadi Murmu =

The Honourable Droupadi Murmu CF
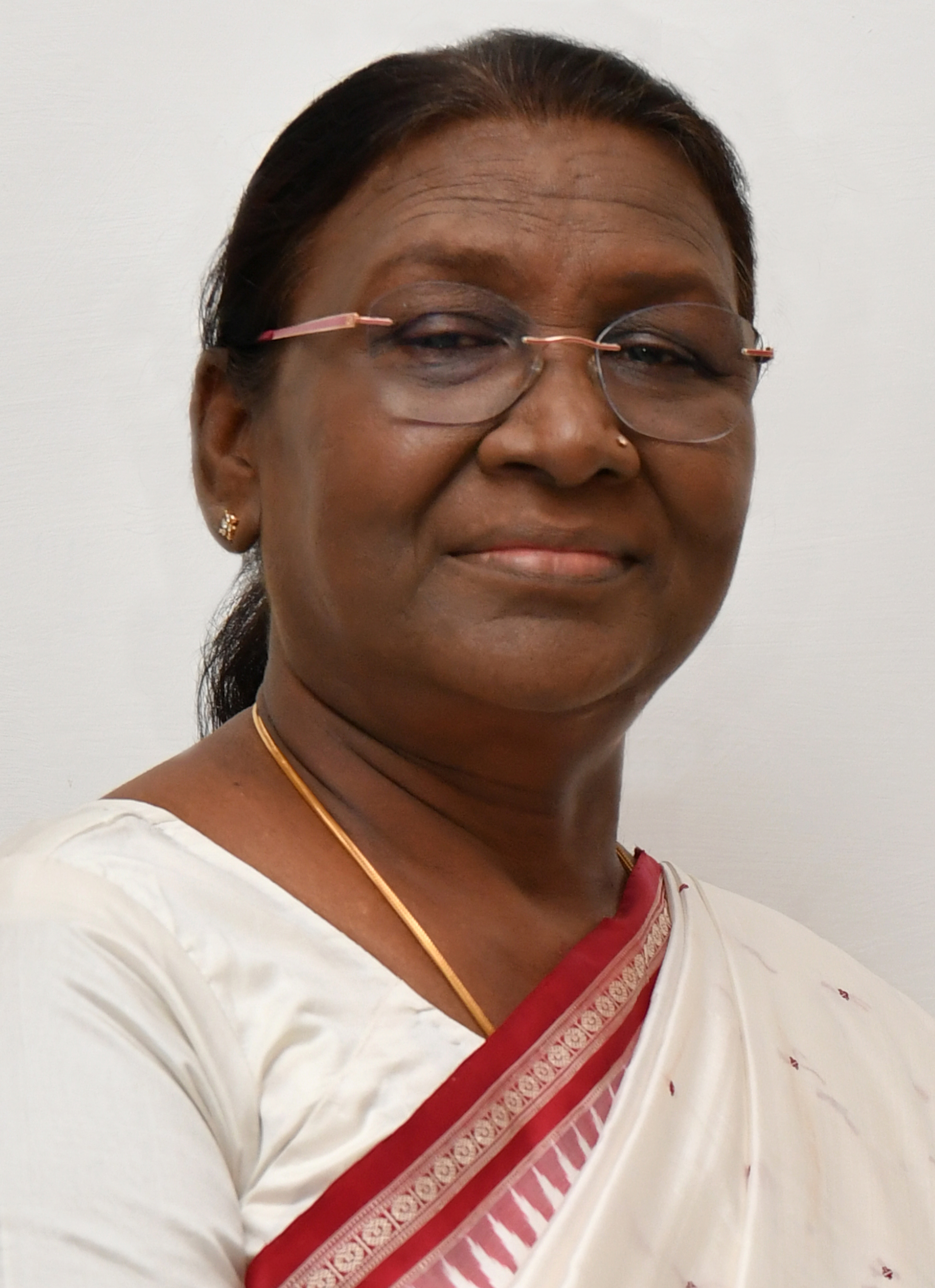
- Official portrait, 2022
- Born: Droupadi Murmu; 20 June 1958 (age 68); Uparbeda, Odisha, India
- Education: Rama Devi Women's University
- Occupations: Politician; Teacher
- Years active: 1997–present
- Office: President of India
- Term: 25 July 2022 – present
- Predecessor: Ram Nath Kovind
- Political party: Bharatiya Janata Party

This is a list of awards, honours, and recognitions received by Droupadi Murmu, the 15th and current President of India since 2022. During her presidency, Murmu has been conferred with several ceremonial honours and distinctions by foreign governments during state visits.

== State honours ==
Ribbon	Decoration	Country	Date	Location	Presenter	Note	Post-nominal letters	Ref(s)	Image
	Honorary Order of the Yellow Star	Suriname	5 June 2023	Paramaribo	President; Chan Santokhi	Grand Order Chain, the highest civilian honour of Suriname.	–		
	Order of Fiji	Fiji	6 August 2024	Suva	President; Wiliame Katonivere	Honorary Companion, the highest civilian honour of Fiji.	CF		
	Order of Timor-Leste	Timor-Leste	10 August 2024	Dili	President; Jose Ramos-Horta	Grand Collar, the highest civilian honour of Timor-Leste.	–		

== Key to the City ==
Year	Honour	City	Country	Presenter	Ref(s)
2025	City Key of Honour and Honorary Citizenship of Lisbon	Lisbon	Portugal	Mayor; Carlos Moedas	

== Scholastic ==
Year	Degree	University	Country	Ref(s)
2024	Doctor of Civil Law	University of Mauritius	Mauritius	
2024	Doctor of Political Science	Sidi Abdellah Science and Technology Pole University	Algeria	
2025	Honorary doctorate	Constantine the Philosopher University in Nitra	Slovakia	
2026	Honorary doctorate	Bucharest Academy of Economic Studies	Romania	

== Addresses to foreign legislatures ==
Country	Legislature	Date	Ref.
Fiji	Parliament of Fiji	6 August 2024	
Angola	National Assembly of Angola	16 June 2025	
Botswana	Parliament of Botswana	12 November 2025	
North Macedonia	Assembly of North Macedonia	21 July 2026	
