= Gopabandhu Choudhuri =

Indian activist, social worker and freedom fighter (1895–1958)

Gopabandhu Choudhury
- Gopabandhu Choudhury, Descendant of the Zamindars of Kherasa
- Born: 8 May 1895; Kherasa, Cuttack (now Jagatsinghpur)
- Died: 29 April 1958 (aged 62)
- Education: Presidency College, Kolkata
- Political party: Indian National Congress
- Spouse: Ramadevi Choudhury
- Children: Annapurna Choudhury; Manmohan Choudhury
- Relatives: Nabakrushna Choudhuri (brother); Malati Choudhury (sister in law); Gopala Ballabha Das (father in law); Madhusudan Das (uncle in law)

Gopabandhu Choudhuri (also spelled Gopabandhu Choudhury; 8 May 1895 – 29 April 1958) was an Indian activist, social worker and freedom fighter. He participated in the Non-cooperation Movement, Civil Disobedience movement.

== Early life ==
Gopabandhu Choudhury was born on 8 May 1895 in an aristocratic Zamindar Karan family to Gokulananda Choudhury at the village of Kherasa, Cuttack (now in Jagatsinghpur). His father was an eminent advocate. His younger brother was Nabakrushna Choudhury who was elected two times as Chief Minister of Odisha.

He graduated from Presidency College with B.A. in mathematics in the year 1912. He got his master's degree from the same college in 1914 . In 1917 he got his preliminary law degree from the Calcutta University . After his education he joined the British Government as a deputy magistrate.

Gopabandhu married Rama Devi, niece of Madhusudan Das on 1914.

== Indian Freedom Movement ==
In 1921 after four years of working for British Government, he resigned from his job as of Deputy Magistrate . He decided to spend the rest of his life in the service of the people. It was an unprecedented action which surprised the people of Odisha.

In the words of novelist, Jnanpitha Award Winner and his biographer Gopinath Mohanty ,

There was a tremor in Orissa. Almost all the newspapers reported the incident. People came running to him. Friends and relatives were shocked. They came to find the reasons for such unusual step. The people in freedom movement however, came to congratulate him. Everywhere they were talking, 'Gopa Babu had resigned’.

His resignation, which was an extraordinary step and a brave decision, brought him immediately to the middle of the Indian freedom movement. While most of the population thought his resignation was a great sacrifice but he himself never considered it as such.

He selected Jagatsinghpur as his place of work. He laid the foundation of famous "Alakashrama" near the banks of Alaka river January 1922. There was a school attached to the ashram. Along with imparting education, the school also taught sanitation work and ran programmes to fight the communicable diseases like malaria and cholera. In 1921, he represented Orissa in AICC. It was the first time that Orissa was represented in AICC. His responsibility was to popularize the Congress, and expand its organisational base. He was also responsible for the Congress office and managed the Congress establishment in Orissa.

In his political thought, he was a dedicated Congressman with unwavering faith in Mahatma Gandhi. He never wanted power for himself. His belief was a strong Congress would be crucial to achieving independence from British.Hence His goal was to strengthen the Congress.He did not contest the elections for Provincial Legislative Assembly. he led a group of Congress workers who would shun power, who would not sit on any committee nor would be members of any Board. They would work to strengthen the Congress. For him, the freedom movement and the leadership of Mahatma Gandhi was the most important consideration. So, he was eager to merge Utkal Sammilani with Congress and fight for separate linguistic province under the aegis of Congress. However, there was a group of Utkal sammilani members who was opposed to the idea. Ultimately Choudhury could not reconcile with both the factions and resigned from Utkal sammilani in 1924.

In 1934, Mahatma Gandhi undertook a padyatra in Orissa. One of the places he visited during his travel was a remote village Bari, in Jajpur subdivision of the erstwhile Cuttack district. Bari and surrounding areas were regularly afflicted with floods. He was posted here during his days in the Government service and he was well acquainted with the area. Gandhi suggested Gopabandhu to choose one of such place and to stay there to work with the people. Gopabandhu selected Bari . He set up a base at Bari with his family and a few followers on 13 August 1934. While he remained a congress member, he bid adieu to active politics.

At Bari, he undertook many social reconstruction various programmes such as village cleaning, teaching Dalits, empowering Dalits to fight exploitation by landowners. He also undertook setting up small scale industries like leather tanning and manufacturing units, units to produce molasses, units to manufacture khadi, units to produce soap and paper etc. He also encouraged local people into vocations such as apiculture, dairy farm, basket and mattress production. He trained farmers to grow new vegetables such as tomato, cauliflower, etc. and plant various fruit bearing plants. The practice of growing vegetables that was started by him still continues in Bari and its nearby areas. Besides his work to strengthen the village economy, he also wanted to bring in inter-caste harmony. He persuaded the villagers to let untouchables enter into the Baldevjiu temple as early as 1936. He translated Mahatma Gandhi's biography "my experiments with truth" to odia, "satyara prayog"

== Post Independence ==
India got independence in 1947. He continued his work at Bari that he began before independence. He was however disillusioned by the Congress governments approach towards governance. He boycotted the 1952 elections and joined the Acharya Vinoba Bhave led Bhoodan movement.
