= Ramadeva =

Ramadeva may refer to any of the following Indian kings:

- Ramabhadra (c. 833–836 CE), a king of the Gurjara-Pratihara dynasty
- Ramachandra of Devagiri (r. c. 1271-1311 CE), a king of the Seuna or Yadava dynasty
- Rama Deva Raya (r. c. 1617–1632 CE), a king of the Vijayanagara empire's Aravidu dynasty

== See also ==
- Baba Ramdev (disambiguation)
- Rama Devi (disambiguation)
