= Droupadi Murmu =

President of India since 2022

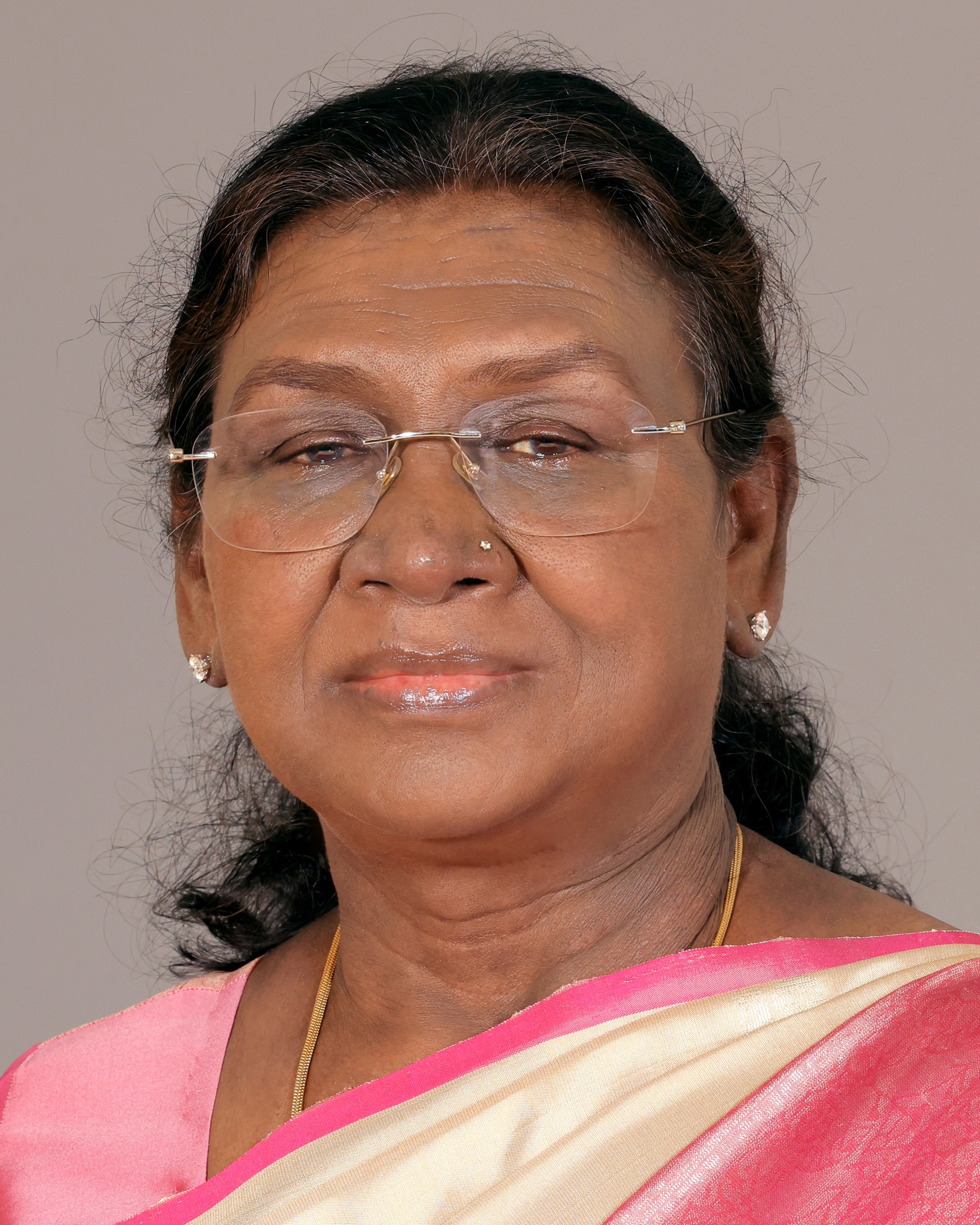
- Official portrait, 2025

President of India
- Incumbent
- Assumed office 25 July 2022
- Prime Minister: Narendra Modi
- Vice President: Venkaiah Naidu; Jagdeep Dhankhar; C. P. Radhakrishnan
- Preceded by: Ram Nath Kovind

Governor of Jharkhand
- In office 18 May 2015 – 15 July 2021
- Chief Minister: Raghubar Das; Hemant Soren
- Preceded by: Syed Ahmed
- Succeeded by: Ramesh Bais
Positions in Odisha
Odisha Minister of State (Independent Charge) for Fisheries and Animal Resources
In office 6 August 2002 ‍–‍ 16 May 2004
Chief Minister	Naveen Patnaik
Preceded by	Biswabhusan Harichandan
Succeeded by	Damodar Rout
Odisha Minister of State (Independent Charge) for Commerce and Transport
In office 6 March 2000 ‍–‍ 6 August 2002
Chief Minister	Naveen Patnaik
Succeeded by	Arabinda Dhali
Member of Odisha Legislative Assembly
In office 5 March 2000 ‍–‍ 21 May 2009
Preceded by	Laxman Majhi
Succeeded by	Shyam Charan Hansdah
Constituency	Rairangpur

Personal details
- Born: Durgi Tudu; 20 June 1958 (age 68) Uparbeda, Odisha, India
- Party: Bharatiya Janata Party
- Spouse: Shyam Charan Murmu (m. 1980; died 2014)
- Children: 3
- Education: Rama Devi Women's University (B.A.)
- Occupation: Politician
- Profession: Teacher
- Awards: List of awards and honours
- Website: presidentofindia.nic.in

Droupadi Murmu (Note: Hindi: [d̪ɾɔːpəd̪iː mʊɾmuː]) (born Durgi Tudu; (Note: Hindi: [d̪ʊɾɡiː t̪ʊd̪uː]) 20 June 1958) is an Indian politician who has served as the president of India since 2022. She won the 2022 presidential election from the Bharatiya Janata Party (BJP). She is the first person belonging to a tribal community and also the second woman, after Pratibha Patil, to hold the office. She is also the youngest person to occupy the post (at 64) and the first president born in independent India.

Previously, she served as the governor of Jharkhand from 2015 to 2021, being the longest-serving governor for that state, as a member of the Odisha Legislative Assembly from Rairangpur Assembly constituency from 2000 to 2009, and as minister of State (Independent Charge), Government of Odisha, from 2000 to 2004. Before entering politics, she worked as a clerk in the State Irrigation and Power Department from 1979 to 1983, and then as a teacher in Rairangpur from 1994 until 1997.

== Personal life ==
Droupadi Murmu was born to a Santali family on 20 June 1958, in Uparbeda village in the Baidaposi area of Rairangpur, Odisha. Her father Biranchi Narayan Tudu was a farmer. Her father and grandfather were traditional heads (designated Sarpanch) of the village council (Gram Panchayat). Her family named her Durgi Tudu, after her paternal grandmother, and her nickname was Batti which eventually became Puti. She was renamed by her school teacher to Droupadi, and her name was changed several times to those including Durpadi and Dorpdi in the past.

Murmu studied elementary education at the local primary school in Upar Beda. At age five, she moved to Bhubaneswar for higher studies. She completed secondary education from Girl's High School Unit-2, and graduated in B.A. from Rama Devi Women's University.

She married Shyam Charan Murmu (1 April 1958 – 1 August 2014), a banker, in 1980 with whom she had two sons and a daughter, Itishree Murmu. Her husband, two sons (Sipun died in a road accident and Laxman died in mysterious circumstances), mother, and a brother all died in a span of 7 years, from 2009 to 2015. She is a follower of the Brahma Kumaris spiritual movement.

Murmu is an admirer of India's first prime minister, Jawaharlal Nehru. She has also hailed Mahatma Gandhi and B. R. Ambedkar.

== Early career ==
From 1979 to 1983, Murmu worked as a junior assistant at the irrigation department of the Government of Odisha. From 1994 to 1997, she then worked as a teacher at the school Sri Aurobindo Integral Education and Research Centre in Rairangpur, where she taught Hindi, Odia, mathematics, and geography. She never claimed a full salary at the school.

== Political career ==
In 1997, Droupadi Murmu was elected as the councillor of the Rairangpur Nagar Panchayat as an independent candidate from a reserved seat for scheduled tribe women, and subsequently became Vice Chairperson of Rairangpur NAC. She joined the Bharatiya Janata Party (BJP) the same year.

She won the 2000 Odisha Legislative Assembly election from the Rairangpur Assembly constituency and served two terms in the Odisha Legislative Assembly between 2000 and 2009. During the BJP and BJD coalition government in Odisha, she was the Minister of State with Independent Charge for Commerce and Transportation from 6 March 2000 to 6 August 2002, and Fisheries and Animal Resources Development from 6 August 2002 to 16 May 2004.

In 2007, she received the Nilkanth Award for the Best MLA of the Odisha Legislative Assembly. In 2009, she lost the Lok Sabha election from Mayurbhanj Lok Sabha constituency as the BJD and BJP alliance had ended. She was elected to the BJP National Executive (ST Morcha) in 2013, and was the district president until 2015.

== Governor of Jharkhand (2015–2021) ==
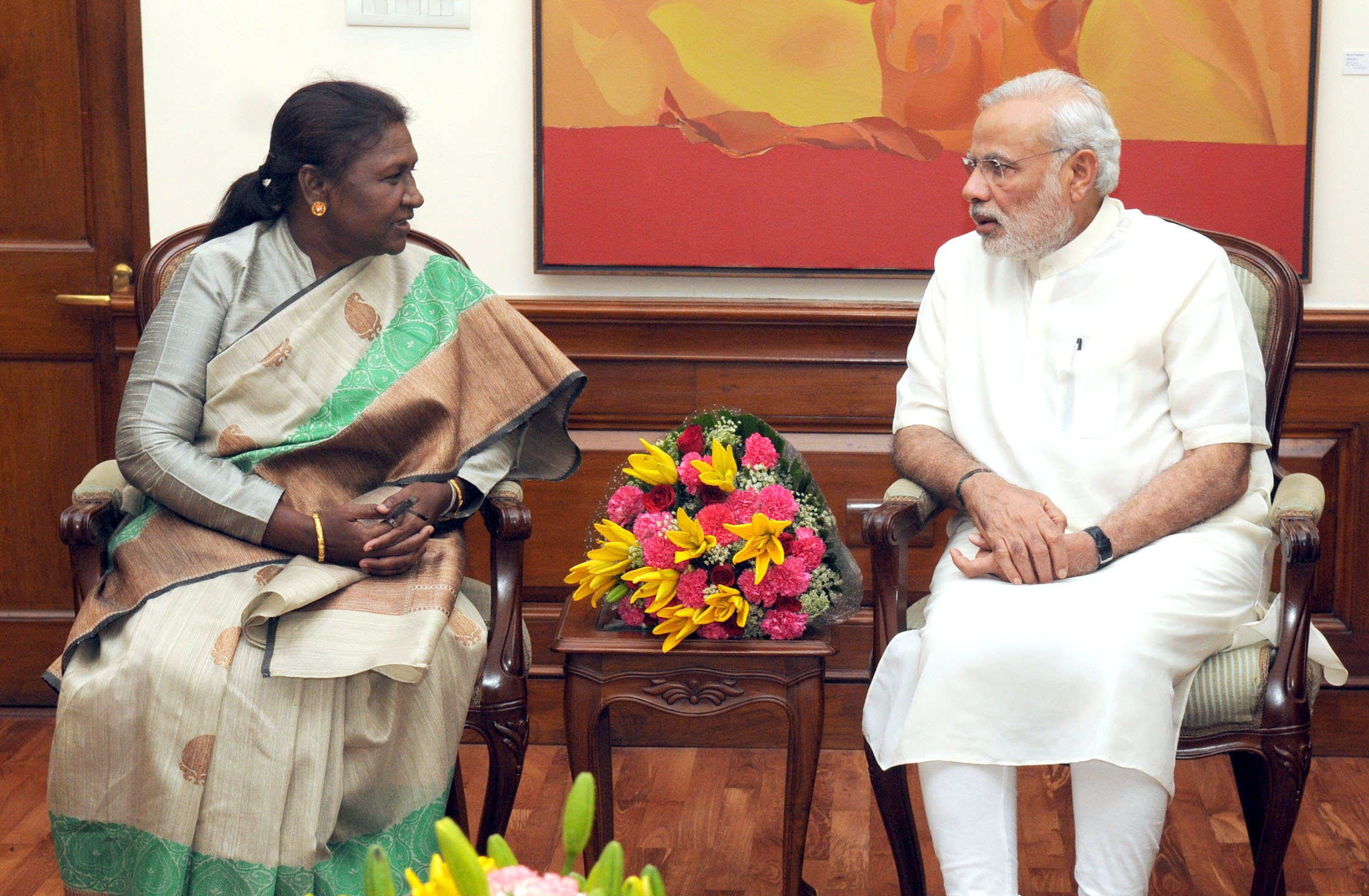
Governor Murmu with Prime Minister Narendra Modi in 2015

Murmu was sworn in as the Governor of Jharkhand on 18 May 2015, becoming the first woman to hold the position. The BJP was in power in the Jharkhand Government for most of her six-year tenure as a governor and was also in power in the Union Government throughout her tenure. She administered the oath of office to Hemant Soren as Chief Minister of Jharkhand in 2019.

Her six-year tenure as Governor began in May 2015 and ended in July 2021.

=== Pathalgadi movement ===
In 2016–2017, the Raghubar Das ministry was seeking amendments to the Chhotanagpur Tenancy Act, 1908, and the Santhal Pargana Tenancy Act, 1949. These two original laws had safeguarded the rights of tribal communities on their land. According to the existing laws, land transactions could only be done between tribal communities. The new amendments gave the tribals the right to allow the government to make commercial use of tribal land and to take tribal land on lease. The proposed bill amending the existing law had been approved by the Jharkhand Legislative Assembly. The bills were sent to Murmu for approval in November 2016.

The tribal people had strongly objected to the proposed law. During the Pathalgadi movement, protests were held against the proposed amendments to the tenancy acts. In one incident, the protest turned violent and the tribals abducted the security detail of the BJP Member of Parliament Karia Munda. Police responded with a violent crack-down on tribal communities, that caused the death of a tribal man. Criminal cases were filed against more than 200 people including the tribal rights activist Stan Swamy. Murmu was criticised for her soft stand on police aggression against tribal communities during the movement. According to woman tribal rights activist Aloka Kujur she was expected to speak up to the government in support of the tribals but this did not happen, and instead she appealed to the Pathalgarhi agitation leaders to repose faith in the constitution.

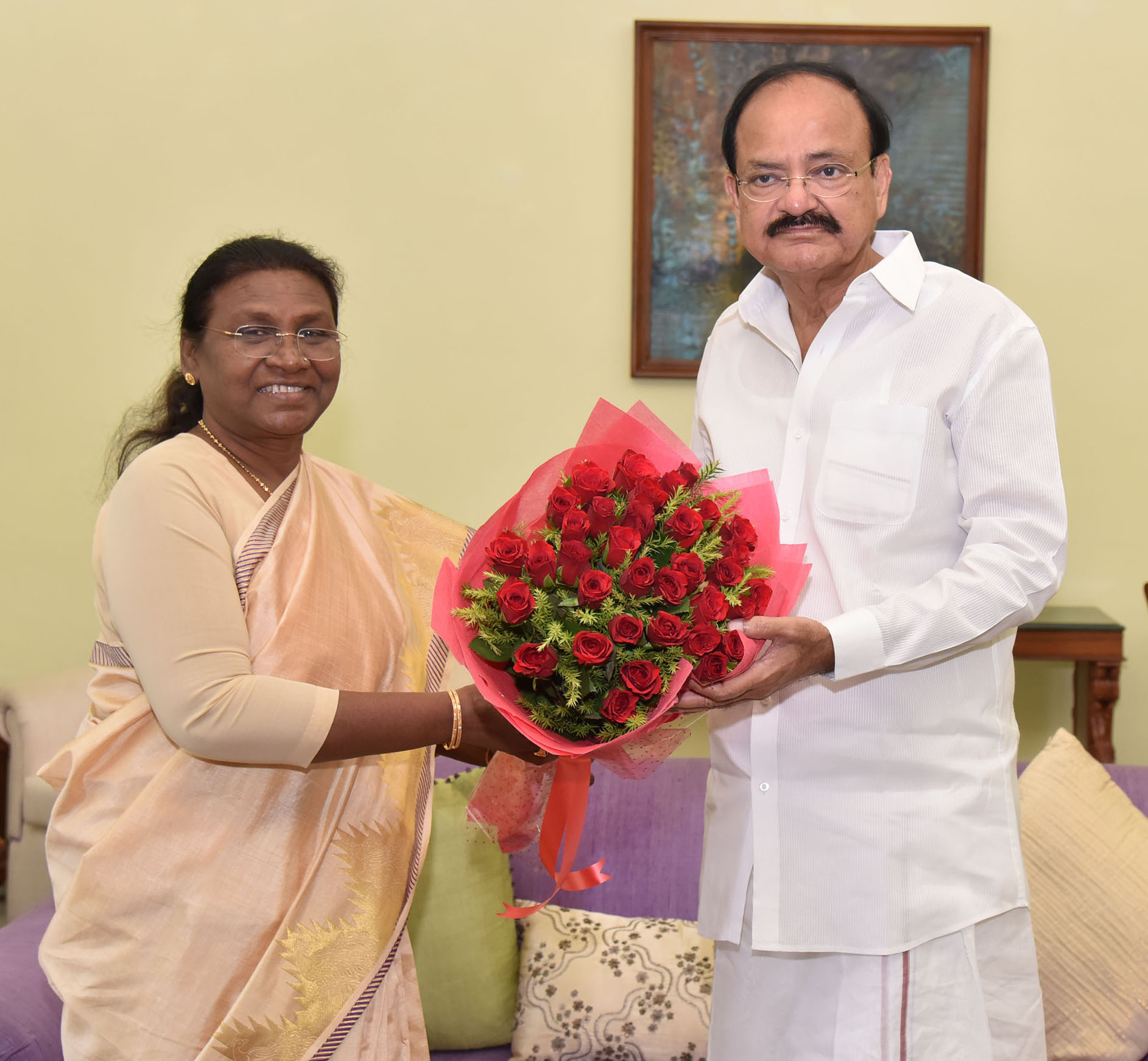
Murmu with Vice-President M. Venkaiah Naidu in New Delhi in 2017

Murmu had received total of 192 memorandums against the amendments in the bill. Then opposition leader Hemant Soren had said that the BJP government wanted to acquire tribal land through the two amendment Bills for the benefit of corporates. Opposition parties Jharkhand Mukti Morcha, the Indian National Congress, the Jharkhand Vikas Morcha and others had put intense pressure against the bill. On 24 May 2017, Murmu relented and refused to give assent to the bills and returned the bill to the state government along with the memorandums she had received. The bill was later withdrawn in August 2017.

=== Religion and land bill ===
In 2017, she approved the Freedom of Religion Bill, 2017, and the bill to amend the Land Acquisition 2013 Act passed by the Jharkhand Assembly.

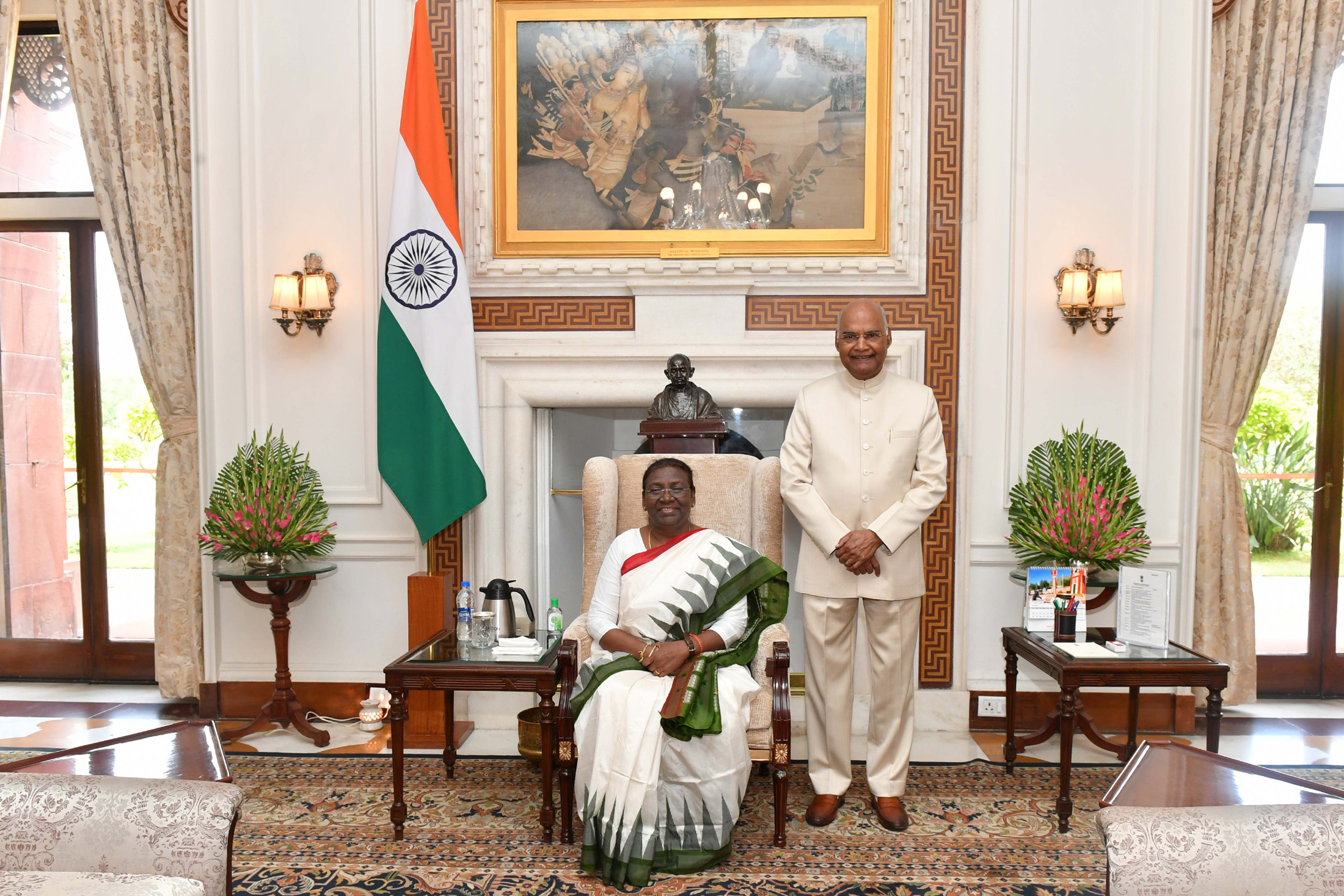
President Murmu and outgoing President Ram Nath Kovind at Rashtrapati Bhavan after swearing-in ceremony on 25 July 2022.

The new religion bill makes it an offence subject to a penalty of three years in prison, to coerce or lure a person to convert their religion. If the person coerced is a member of a Scheduled Caste or Tribe, a minor, or female, the prison term increases to four years. Fines can be levied in any case. The bill also made it mandatory for voluntary converts, to inform the Deputy Commissioner about their conversion, and to give full details about the circumstances.

The amendments in the Land Acquisition Act, 2013, involved changes in the compensation duration and requirements for social impacts assessment. According to the passed law, monetary compensation for government acquisition of tribal land must be paid within six months of acquisition. The requirement for social impact assessments was dropped for some types of infrastructure projects.

== Presidency (2022–present) ==
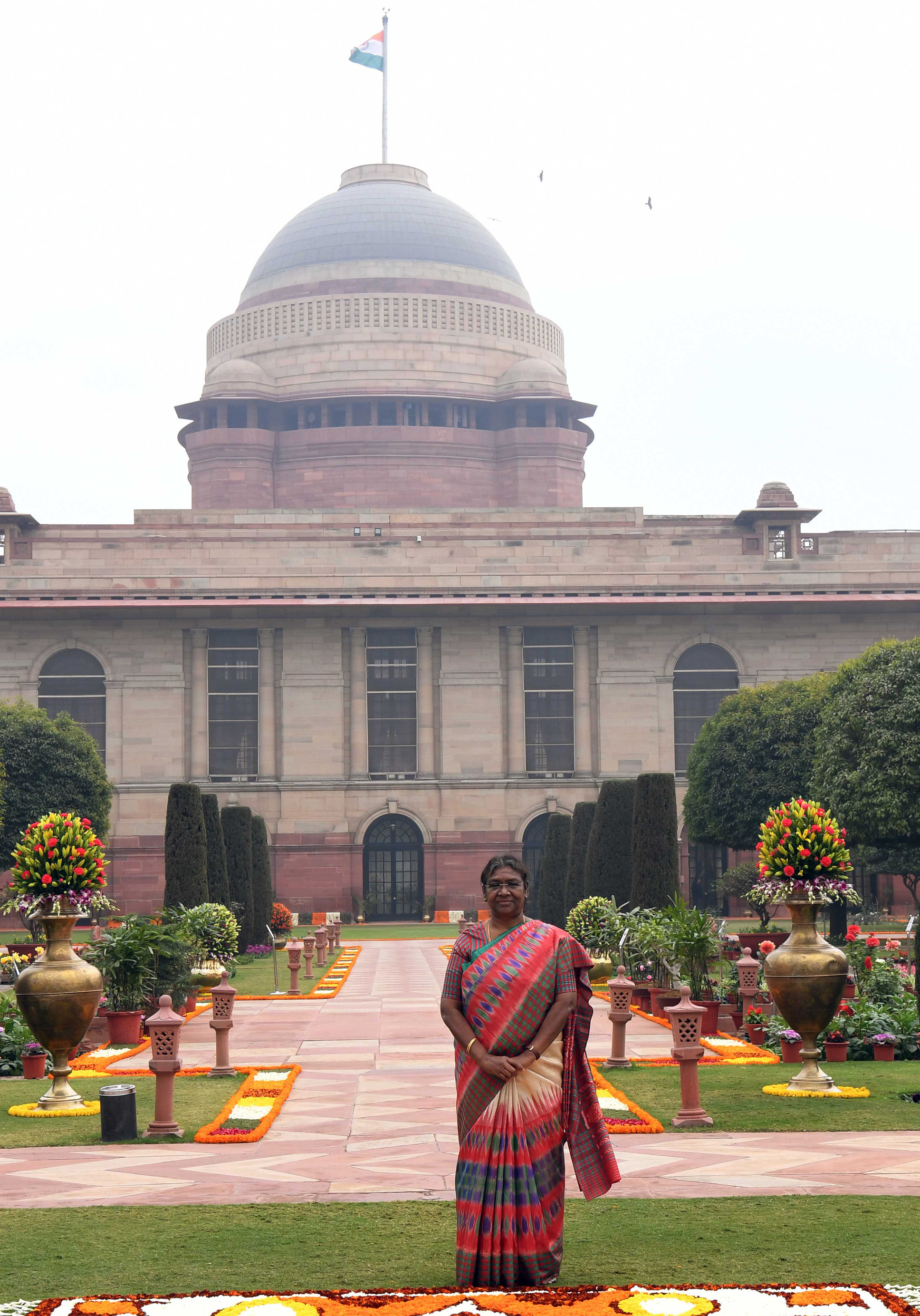
President Murmu at the President's official residence, Rashtrapati Bhavan

In June 2022, the BJP nominated Murmu as the National Democratic Alliance (NDA)'s candidate for President of India for the 2022 Indian presidential election the following month. Yashwant Sinha, was nominated as the candidate for president by the opposition parties. On 21 July 2022, Murmu secured a clear majority in the 2022 presidential election defeating common opposition candidate Yashwant Sinha with 676,803 electoral votes (64.03% of total) in 21 of the 28 states (including in the union territory of Puducherry) to become the 15th President of India.

On 26 July 2022, Droupadi Murmu took the oath as the 15th President of India which was administered by the 48th Chief Justice of India N. V. Ramana in the presence of former presidents, the vice-president, prime minister, and other delegates.

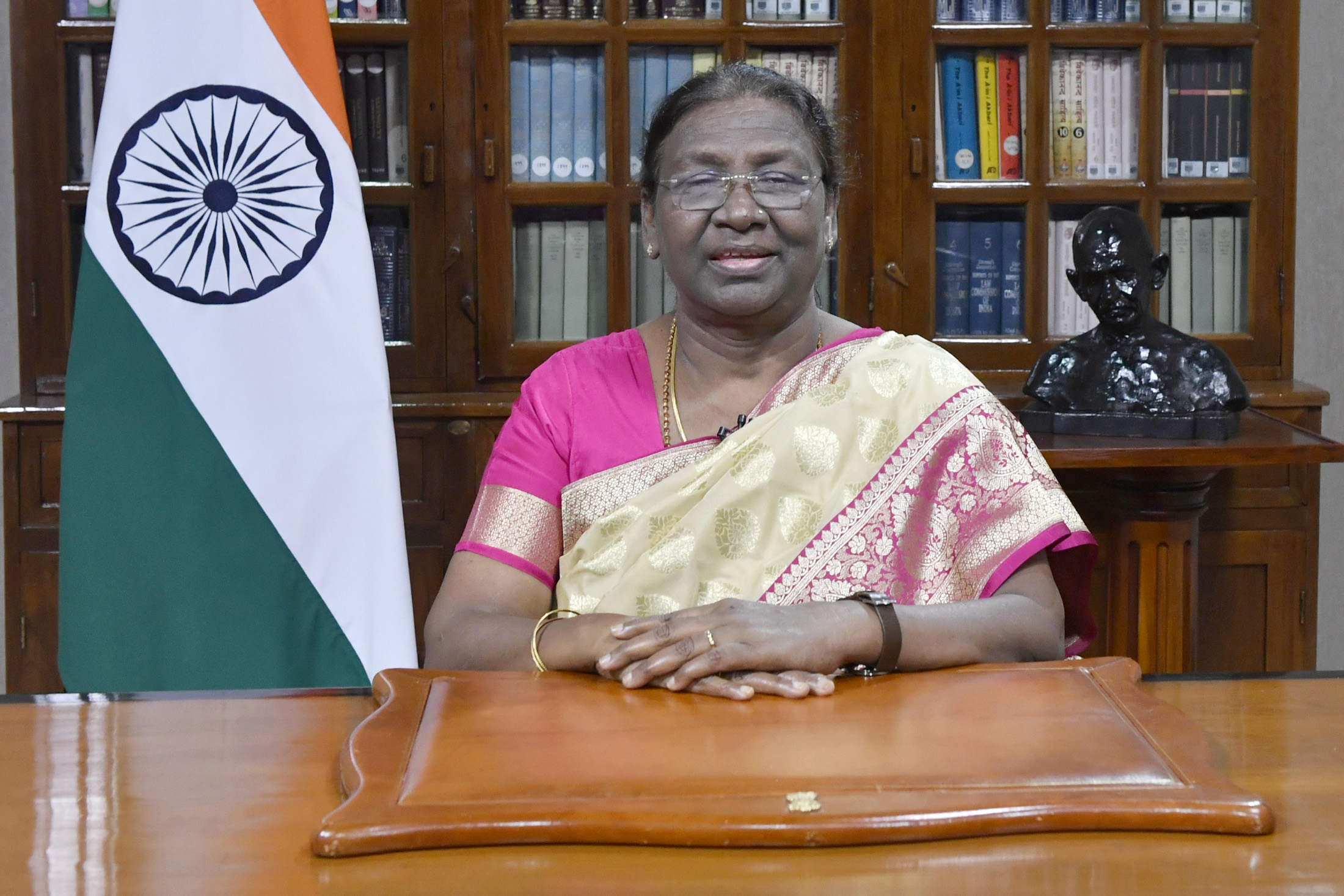
President Murmu addressing the nation for first time on 75th Independence Day, 15 August 2022

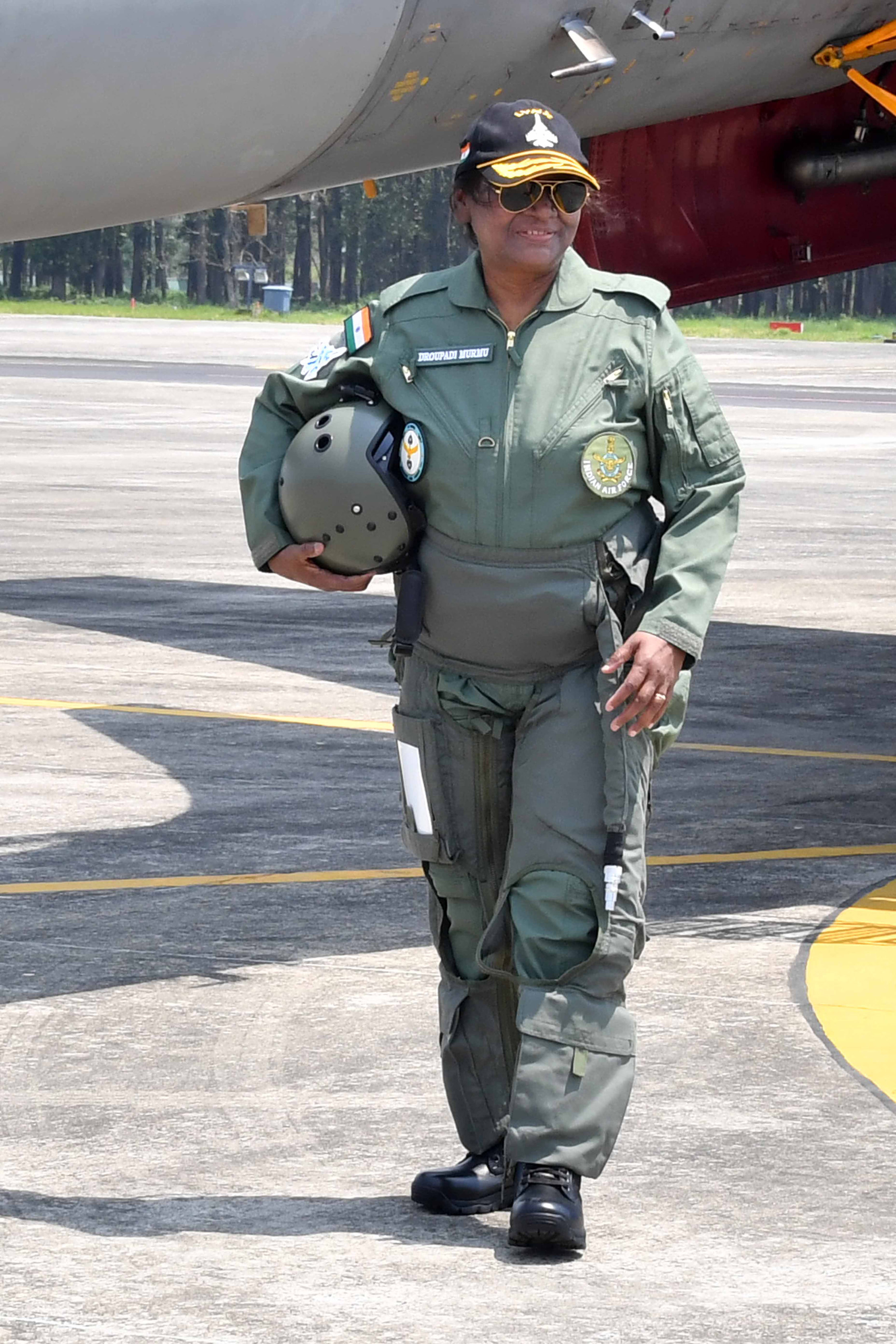
President Murmu taking a sortie in a Sukhoi Su-30MKI fighter aircraft at Tezpur Air Force Station, Assam.

She is the first person from India's designated tribal communities to be elected president. She is the youngest and first individual born after India's independence in 1947 to have been elected president. Murmu is the second woman after Pratibha Patil to serve as president.

In September 2022, she launched a government program 'Pradhanmantri TB mukht Bharat' – an initiative to eradicate tuberculosis from the country.

In May 2023, a row arose when the New Parliament House, under the Central Vista Project was inaugurated by Prime Minister Narendra Modi. The opposition demanded it to be inaugurated by Murmu as the constitutional head of state, and boycotted the ceremony. However, later, Murmu stated that the "Prime Minister symbolises parliament's trust, and she was proud and deeply satisfied with the inauguration".

On 29 February 2024, she addressed the inaugural session of the International Conference on Disaster Resilient Infrastructure (ICDRI) and emphasized India's commitment to global cooperation in building resilient infrastructure.

On 8 March 2024, President Murmu presented the Nari Shakti Puraskar at Rashtrapati Bhavan on International Women's Day. She commended the awardees for their outstanding contributions to women's empowerment across various sectors.

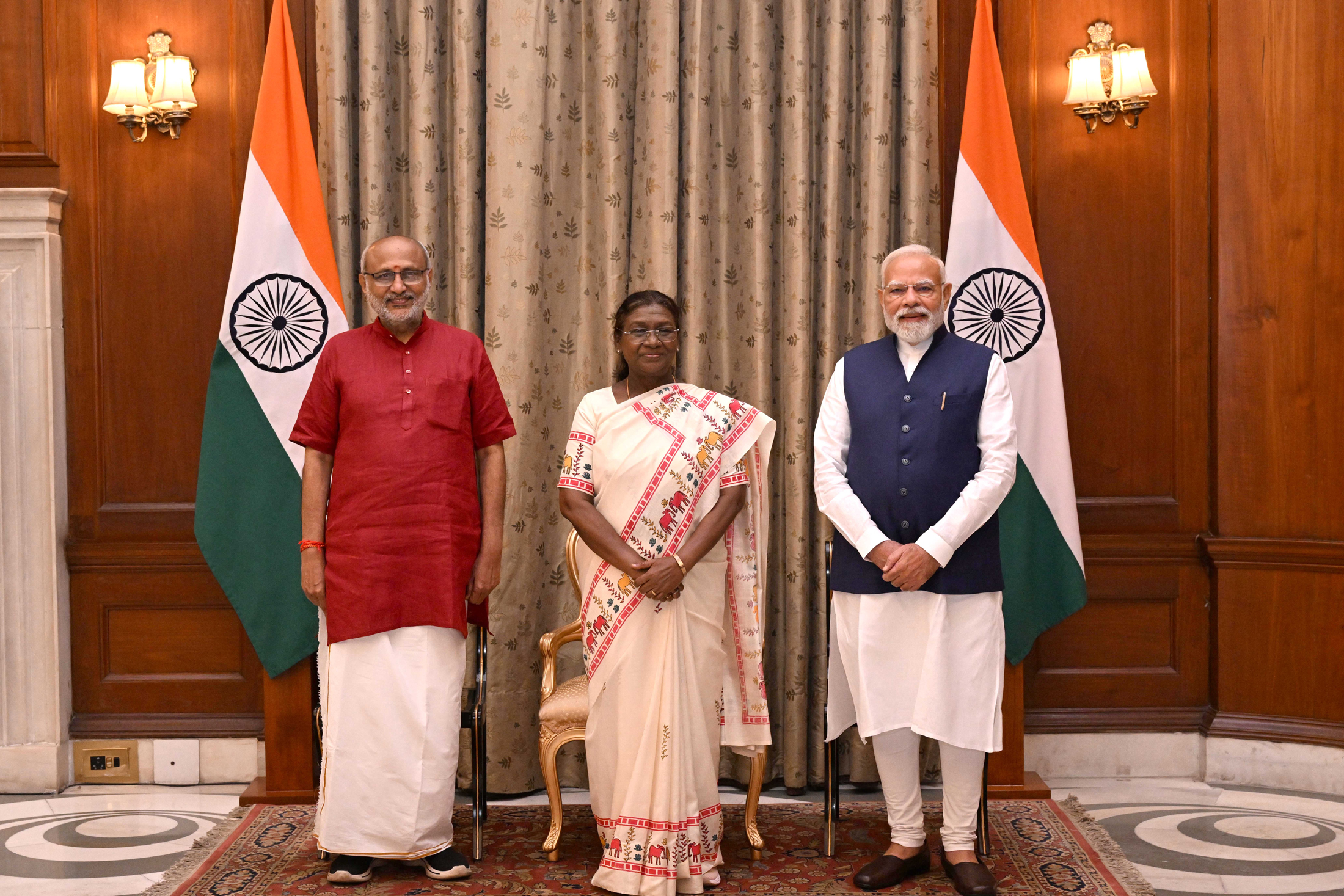
President Murmu administering the oath of office to C. P. Radhakrishnan as the Vice President of India at Rashtrapati Bhavan, New Delhi, on 12 September 2025.

On 27 June 2024, Murmu addressed a joint sitting of the Parliament of India at the beginning of the 18th Lok Sabha. She hailed the record voter turnout and the participation of all sections of society, including the people of Jammu and Kashmir, and lauded their commitment to strengthening Indian democracy. On 9 March 2025, she inaugurated the second edition of Vividhta Ka Amrit Mahotsav at Rashtrapati Bhavan, a cultural festival celebrating South Indian traditions, crafts, and cuisines. The event aimed to promote unity in diversity and local artisanship. After the inauguration of C. P. Radhakrishnan as the new vice president, she became the first president to serve with three vice presidents.

On 18 February 2026, in her capacity as Supreme Commander of the Indian Armed Forces, Murmu reviewed the International Fleet Review 2026 off the coast of Visakhapatnam, Andhra Pradesh, aboard the presidential yacht INS Sumedha, witnessing participation from 74 navies under the theme "United Through Oceans".

President of Moldova Maia Sandu hosting President of India Droupadi Murmu in Chișinău on 20 July 2026.

From 19 to 21 March 2026, Murmu undertook a three-day tour of Uttar Pradesh, where she offered prayers and participated in the Shri Ram Yantra Sthapana at the Shri Ram Janmbhoomi Mandir in Ayodhya, inaugurated the Nand Kishor Somani Oncology Block at Ramakrishna Mission Sevashram in Vrindavan, and performed the Govardhan Parikrama in Mathura.

The President of India, Smt Droupadi Murmu hosted the ‘At Home’ reception on the occasion of 80th Independence Day celebrations at Rashtrapati Bhavan, in New Delhi on August 15, 2026.

On 28 July 2026, to mark the completion of four years in office, Murmu launched several public-centric and sustainability initiatives at Rashtrapati Bhavan, including a multilingual e-Audio Guide supporting 16 languages with a sign language module, the third edition of the e-Upahaar online charity auction, the Bachpan 'Bal Parisar' child development complex, and RAAH, a fare-free electric bus service within the estate. During the event, Vice President C. P. Radhakrishnan also released five commemorative books documenting her four-year tenure.

In July 2026, Murmu undertook landmark state visits to Europe, becoming the first Indian President to visit Moldova on 20 July (meeting President Maia Sandu and expanding ITEC training slots) and visiting Romania on 23 July in the first such trip in nearly three decades.

In August 2026, Murmu gave presidential assent to several major bills passed during the Monsoon Session of Parliament, including the Public Examinations (Prevention of Unfair Means) Amendment Act, 2026, on 1 August, and the Taxation and Other Laws (Amendment) Act, 2026, alongside amendments to the Payment and Settlement Systems Act, on 17 August.

PM Modi President Murmu and Vice President Radhakrishnan at the Parliament premises, after paying floral tributes to Bhagwan Birsa Munda on his birth anniversary, in New Delhi on November 15, 2026.

During an official visit to Gujarat from 21 to 23 September 2026, Murmu presented the 72nd National Film Awards at Ekta Nagar, addressed the 75th annual convocation of the Maharaja Sayajirao University of Baroda, and inaugurated the Brahma Kumaris 'Global Spiritual Palace' Retreat Centre in Vadodara.

On 31 October 2026, Murmu participated in the Dhwaj Stambh Pujan, Dhwaja Pujan, and Dhwajarohan (flag-hoisting) ceremonies in Nashik and Trimbakeshwar, Maharashtra, formally inaugurating the Nashik–Trimbakeshwar Simhastha Maha Kumbh, alongside unveiling the official anthem, website, and commemorative stamps.

== Books and biographies ==
- Ray, Kasturi (2023). Droupadi Murmu: From Tribal Hinterlands to Raisina Hill. Rupa Publications. ISBN 978-9357022002.
- Sahu, Sandeep (2023). Madam President: The Biography of Droupadi Murmu. Penguin India. ISBN 978-0143459798.
- Wings to Our Hopes (series) and Kahani Rashtrapati Bhavan Ki — official commemorative volumes compiled by the Directorate of Publications Division documenting her speeches and tenure.

== Electoral history ==
2000 Orissa Legislative Assembly election: Rairangpur
Party	Candidate	Votes	%	±%
BJP	Droupadi Murmu	25,110	34.15	
INC	Laxman Majhi	20,542	27.93	
JMM	Braja Mohan Hansdah	10,485	14.26	
Majority		4,568	6.21	
Turnout		74,997	59.81	
Registered electors		125,385		
BJP gain from INC				

2004 Orissa Legislative Assembly election: Rairangpur
Party	Candidate	Votes	%	±%
BJP	Droupadi Murmu	29,295	32.66	
JMM	Ram Chandra Murmu	29,253	32.62	
INC	Laxman Majhi	22,551	25.14	
Majority		42	0.05	
Turnout		89,689	68.3	
Registered electors		131,315		
BJP hold				

In 2009 election, Biju Janata Dal candidate Laxman Tudu defeated Jharkhand Mukti Morcha candidate Sudam Marndi by a margin of 66,178 votes.

2009 Indian general elections: Mayurbhanj
Party	Candidate	Votes	%	±%
BJD	Laxman Tudu	256,648	31.08	
JMM	Sudam Marndi	190,470	23.06	
BJP	Droupadi Murmu	150,827	18.26	
INC	Laxman Majhi	140,770	17.04	
Independent	Rameswar Majhi	25,603	3.10	
Majority		66,178	8.02	
Turnout		824,754	70.27	
BJD gain from JMM				

2014 Odisha Legislative Assembly election: Rairangpur
Party	Candidate	Votes	%	±%
BJD	Saiba Sushil Kumar Hansdah	51,062	32.72	
BJP	Droupadi Murmu	44,679	22.76	
JMM	Purna Chandra Marndi	28,838	18.48	
INC	Shyam Charan Hansdah	19,075	12.22	
NOTA	None of the above	1,096	0.7	
Majority		15,556	9.96	
Turnout		156,035	74.22	
BJD gain from INC				

Results of the 2022 Indian presidential election
Candidate	Coalition	Individual votes	Electoral College votes	%
Droupadi Murmu	National Democratic Alliance	2,824	676,803	64.03
Yashwant Sinha	United	1877	380,177	35.97
Valid votes		4,701	1,056,980	98.89
Blank and invalid votes		53	15,397	1.11
Total		4,754	1,072,377	100
Registered voters / Turnout		4,809	1,086,431	98.86

== See also ==
- Presidency of Droupadi Murmu
- List of presidents of India
- List of governors of Jharkhand
- List of elected and appointed female heads of state and government

== Notes ==
Political offices
Preceded by Ram Nath Kovind	President of India; 2022–present	Incumbent
Odisha Legislative Assembly
Preceded by Laxman Majhi	Member of the Legislative Assembly for Rairangpur; 2000–2009	Succeeded by Shyam Charan Hansdah
Government offices
Preceded by Syed Ahmed	Governor of Jharkhand; 2015–2021	Succeeded by Ramesh Bais
Party political offices
Preceded by Ram Nath Kovind	National Democratic Alliance nominee for President of India; 2022	Most recent
