= Karate at the 2010 Asian Games – Women's kumite 50 kg =

Karate competition

Women's kumite 50 kg at the 2010 Asian Games
- Venue: Guangdong Gymnasium
- Date: 24 November 2010
- Competitors: 16 from 16 nations

Medalists
| gold medal | Li Hong | China |
| silver medal | Vũ Thị Nguyệt Ánh | Vietnam |
| bronze medal | Chen Yen-hui | Chinese Taipei |
| bronze medal | Yanisa Torrattanawathana | Thailand |

The women's kumite 50 kilograms competition at the 2010 Asian Games in Guangzhou, China was held on 24 November 2010 at the Guangdong Gymnasium.

== Schedule ==
All times are China Standard Time (UTC+08:00)

| Date | Time | Event |
|---|---|---|
| Wednesday, 24 November 2010 | 13:00 | 1/8 finals |
| Wednesday, 24 November 2010 | 13:00 | Quarterfinals |
| Wednesday, 24 November 2010 | 13:00 | Semifinals |
| Wednesday, 24 November 2010 | 13:00 | Repechage 1 |
| Wednesday, 24 November 2010 | 13:00 | Bronze medal match |
| Wednesday, 24 November 2010 | 16:00 | Final |

== Results ==
Legend

- K — Won by kiken

=== Main bracket ===
1/8 finals
Vũ Thị Nguyệt Ánh (VIE) | 2
Fatemeh Ghasemi (IRI) | 0
Chen Yen-hui (TPE) | 4
Kang Ji-ui (PRK) | 1
Jang So-young (KOR) | 2
Martinel Prihastuti (INA) | 0
Kou Man I (MAC) | 2
Mae Soriano (PHI) | 3
Valena Valentina (IND) | 6
Cholpon Shaidieva (KGZ) | 0
Chansouda Phetsiriseng (LAO) | 3
Kalpana Basnet (NEP) | 1
Venera Zhetibay (KAZ) | 9
Maria José dos Santos (TLS) | 0
Li Hong (CHN) | 1
Yanisa Torrattanawathana (THA) | 0

Quarterfinals
Vũ Thị Nguyệt Ánh (VIE) | 4
Chen Yen-hui (TPE) | 1
Jang So-young (KOR) | 4
Mae Soriano (PHI) | 2
Valena Valentina (IND) | 5
Chansouda Phetsiriseng (LAO) | 2
Venera Zhetibay (KAZ) | 0
Li Hong (CHN) | 1

Semifinals
Vũ Thị Nguyệt Ánh (VIE) | 2
Jang So-young (KOR) | 0
Valena Valentina (IND) | 2
Li Hong (CHN) | 4^{K}

Final
Vũ Thị Nguyệt Ánh (VIE) | 0
Li Hong (CHN) | 2

=== Repechage ===
Repechage 1
Fatemeh Ghasemi (IRI) | 0
Chen Yen-hui (TPE) | 3
Yanisa Torrattanawathana (THA) | 0
Venera Zhetibay (KAZ) | 0

Bronze medal match
Chen Yen-hui (TPE) | 5
Jang So-young (KOR) | 1
Yanisa Torrattanawathana (THA) | K
Valena Valentina (IND)
