= Valena Valentina =

Indian karateka (born 1988)

Personal information
- Full name: Valena Valentina
- Nationality: India
- Born: 8 July 1988 (age 37) Bhubaneswar, Odisha, India

Sport
- Country: India
- Sport: Karate
- Event: 50 kg
- Club: Utkal Karate School
Medal record
Women's Karate
Representing India
South Asian Games
Silver medal – second place	2010 Dhaka	Kumite, -45 kg
Commonwealth Karate Championships
Bronze medal – third place	2018 Durban	Kata

Valena Valentina (born 8 July 1988) is an Indian karate player, from Bhubaneswar, Odisha.

== Early life and education ==
She is the daughter of Radha Raman Mohanty, national level arms wrestler and footballer. She is a graduate of Rama Devi Women's University, Bhubaneswar.

== Career ==
She is a national gold winning karateka at the Karate Association India Championships and the AIKF National Championships. She has won gold medals at the South Asian Karate Championships in Colombo in 2017, in Delhi in 2014 and two gold medals at Delhi in 2011.

At the 2010 Asian Games, Valentina reached the bronze medal match in 50 kg category and finished 4th.

Valentina won a silver medal in the 45 kg category at the 2010 South Asian Games.
