= Lawyers' Day (Odisha) =

Annual observance in Odisha, India

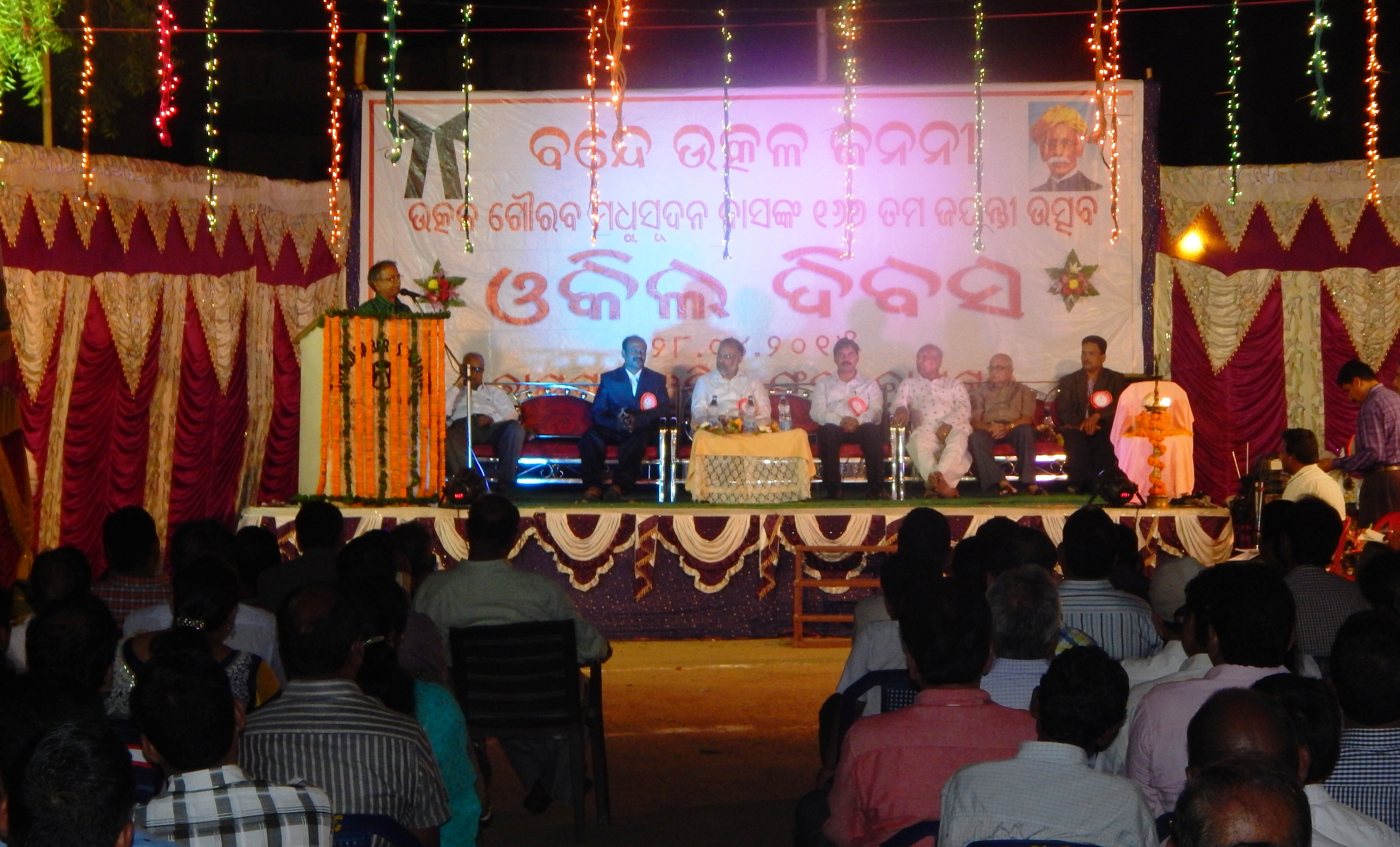
Celebration of Lawyers' Day

Lawyers' Day is celebrated across Odisha in India on April 28 every year to commemorate the birth anniversary of Madhusudan Das, an Oriya lawyer of the British era, popularly called Madhu Babu or Madhu Barrister.

The day is also observed as Swaviman Divas. Many functions including cultural shows are organised by the Bar members throughout the state.
