= Baba Ramdev =

Baba Ramdev may refer to:

- Ramdev (born 1965), Indian yoga guru, businessman and founder of Patanjali Ayurved
- Ramdev Pir, a folk deity of Rajasthan in India
- Baba Ramdev (film), an Indian Rajasthani-language film based on the life of Ramdev Pir

== See also ==
- Ramadeva (disambiguation)
