= Regina Guha =

Indian lawyer and educator

- Guha c. 1913
- Died: 10 August 1919; Calcutta, Bengal Presidency, British India
- Education: University of Calcutta, LLB, 1916
- Relatives: Hannah Sen (sister)

Regina Guha (died 10 August 1919) was a Baghdadi Jewish Indian lawyer and teacher. In 1916, Guha fought a notable case challenging the interpretation of legal provisions that effectively prohibited women from practicing law in India.

== Early life and education ==
Regina Guha was born to Priya Mohan Guha, a Bengali lawyer, and a Baghdadi Jewish mother. Guha's father converted from Hinduism to Judaism and was buried as Abrams Joseph, his Jewish name on conversion. One of four sisters, Guha was the sister of the educator, politician, and feminist Hannah Sen.

Guha's father was a lawyer, inspiring her own decision to pursue the same career. She completed her Master of Arts in 1913, earning a first class degree, and standing first in her class. In 1916, Guha graduated with a Bachelor of Laws from the University of Calcutta.

== Career ==
Regina Guha at her graduation from Calcutta University

In 1916, Guha applied to be enrolled as a "pleader" (present-day lawyer) in the Alipore District Judge's court, but her application was rejected on the grounds that women were not permitted to enroll. Regina challenged this decision at the Calcutta High Court, arguing that the governing legislation, the Legal Practitioners Act, allowed qualified "persons" to enroll as lawyers, and that the definition of 'person' included women. She was represented by Eardley Norton, a lawyer and member of the Indian National Congress. On 29th August 1916, a bench of five male judges of the Calcutta High Court ruled, in the case of In re Regina Guha, that although the governing law, the Legal Practitioners Act 1879, used the term 'person' in regard to enrolment, this term did not include women. They accordingly denied her the right to enroll as a lawyer.

The verdict of In re Regina Guha stated:

"It is clear that the intention of the Legislature was to deal with a recognised existing profession, viz, that of Pleaders, which, up to that time, constituted of men only and to which men only could belong …in respect of which it was admitted that no woman had ever applied for admission as a Pleader. As the law now stands, Miss Regina Guha is not entitled to be enrolled as a Pleader…"

— Verdict

Guha went on to become the headmistress of the Jewish Girls' School in Kolkata, and was the first Jewish principal of the school. Guha also worked as a post-graduate tutor in English at the University of Calcutta.

=== Legacy ===
In 1919, Guha's siblings established an endowment at University of Calcutta in her memory. The "Regina Guha Medal" is given to the student who stood first in the M.A. English examination each year.

In 1921, Sudhanshubala Hazra unsuccessfully challenged the prohibition against women practitioners in the Patna High Court. In 1923, the enactment of the Legal Practitioners (Women) Act eventually removed this restriction, allowing women to enroll and practice law, at which Guha had already passed away.

== Personal life ==
On 10 August 1919, Guha died in Calcutta in her twenties. She died of rheumatic fever.

== Additional reading ==
- In re Regina Guha (1916) 21 CWN 74 the Calcutta High Court).
