= Gopala Ballabha Das =

Indian author and magistrate (1860–1914)

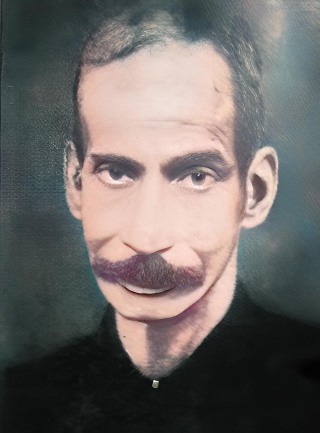
- Restored image of Gopala Ballabha Das
- Born: 23 December 1860; Satyabhamapur, Cuttack, Odisha
- Died: 1914
- Citizenship: British India
- Spouse: Basant Kumari Devi
- Children: 2, including Ramadevi Choudhury
- Parent(s): Choudhury Raghunath Das (father); Parbati Devi (mother)
- Relatives: Madhusudan Das (brother); Gopabandhu Choudhury (son in law)

Gopala Ballabha Das (23 December 1860 – 1914) was an Indian Odia language writer and deputy magistrate, assistant of Odisha commissioner during the British rule in India. He wrote novels, poems, and translated books. His novel, Bhimabhuyan was the first tribal novel.

== Personal life ==
Choudhury Gopala Ballabha Das was born on 23 December 1860 at Satyabhamapur, 20 kilometres (12 mi) from Cuttack during the Company rule in India in an aristocratic Zamindar Karan family. His father was Choudhury Raghunath Das and his mother, Parbati Debi. He is the younger brother of Utkalagourab Madhusudan Das. He was married to Basanta Kumari Devi. His daughter Ramadevi Choudhury was an Indian freedom fighter and a social reformer.

== Education ==
Das had completed his M.A. from Kolkata University.

== Career ==
He had joined British India as a deputy magistrate. Later he became the assistant of the commissioner of Odisha in British Govt. and then became the superintendent of all Gadajata states in Odisha.

== Publications ==
- Bhimabhuyan - 1908
- Priti Sudhakara - 1906
- Atmabata Sarba Bhuteshu - 1888
- Kabita Manjari - 1895
- Bhakti Rasabali - 1900
- Rayabahadur Nandakishore Das Biography
- Ramesh Chandra Dutta Biography (translation)
