= Madhusudan Das =

Freedom fighter, lawyer and social reformer from Odisha, India (1848–1934)

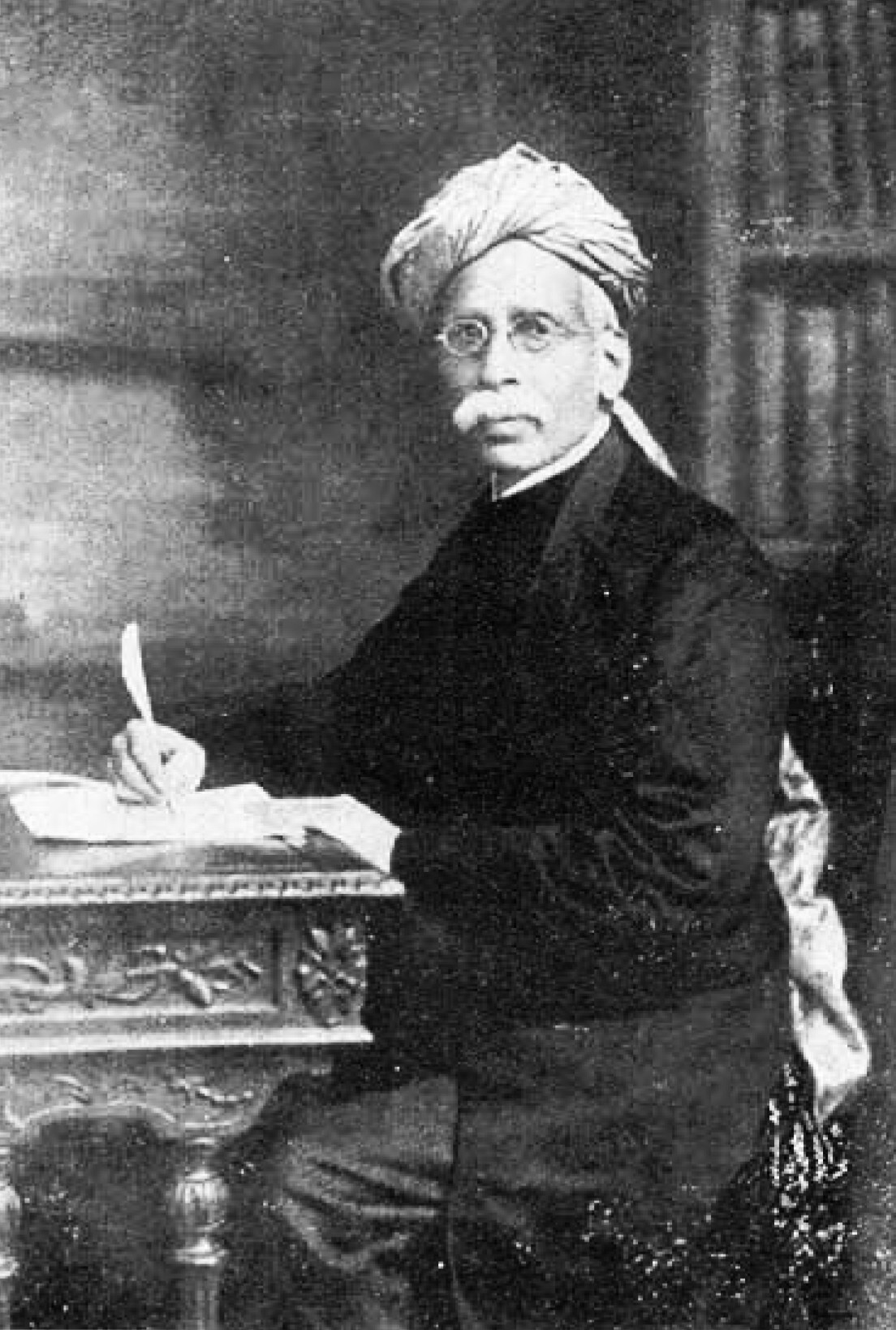
- Utkala Gouraba Madhusudan Das
- Born: 28 April 1848; Satyabhamapur, Cuttack district, Bengal Presidency, Company rule in India
- Died: 4 February 1934 (aged 85); Cuttack, Bihar and Orissa Province, British India
- Education: Calcutta University
- Occupations: Entrepreneur, Lawyer, social reformer, freedom fighter, minister, Industrialist
- Spouse: Soudamini Devi
- Children: Sailabala Das, Sudhanshubala Hazra
- Parent(s): Choudhury Raghunath Das; Parbati Debi
- Relatives: Gopala Ballabha Das (brother); Ramadevi Choudhury (niece)
- Writing career
- Period: 1848–1934

Madhusudan Das (28 April 1848 – 4 February 1934) was an Indian lawyer and social reformer, who founded Utkal Sammilani in 1903 to campaign for the unification of Odisha along with its social and industrial development. He was one of the prominent figure, helping in the creation of Orissa Province (present-day Odisha, India), which was established on 1 April 1936. He was also the first graduate and advocate of Odisha. He is also known as Kulabruddha (Grand Old Man), Madhu Babu, and Utkal Gouraba (Pride of Utkal). In Odisha, his birthday is celebrated as the Lawyers' Day on 28 April.

== Family ==
Madhusudan Das was born 28 April 1848 at Satyabhamapur, 20 kilometres (12 mi) from Cuttack during the Company rule in India in a Zamindar Karan family. His father was Choudhury Raghunath Das and his mother, Parbati Debi. They had initially named him Choudhury Gobinda Ballabha Das . He had two elder sisters and a younger brother named Choudhury Gopalballabha Das. Gopalballabh was a Magistrate at Bihar Province and the father of Ramadevi Choudhury. He was converted to Christianity that caused him boycotted in the village which he had to quit to erect a small house at the end of the village. The house was known as ‘Madhukothi’ or ‘Balipokharikothi’, later on used as the state office of the Kasturba National Memorial Trust, in a part of which was running the Anganabadi, Balbadi. Madhusudan had adopted two Bengali girls; Sailabala Das and Sudhanshubala Hazra. Sailabala was an educationist who had been trained in England, and in whose name the famous Sailabala Women's College, Cuttack was founded. Sailabala was Bengali, and her parents had left her in the care of Madhusudan Das and his wife Soudamini Devi at Calcutta. In 1864, he passed Matriculation from Cuttack and thereafter he was inclined to become a teacher and began his career as a teacher at Balasore for three years. The year 1866 was the year of an acute famine in Odisha, called the "Naanka Durviksha" When more than one lakh people died of hunger. This year he converted himself to Christian and changed his name as Madhusudan Das from his earlier name of Gobinda Ballav Choudhury. Sudhansubala Hazra was also Bengali and she was the first female lawyer of British India. Madhu babu was the resident tutor of Sir Ashutosh Mukherjee, the former Vice-Chancellor of Calcutta University in Calcutta.

== Early life and education ==
After his early education, he moved to Cuttack High School (later known as Ravenshaw Collegiate School) which offered English education. In 1864, he passed the entrance examination and went to Calcutta University. In spite of extremely challenging conditions he lived in Calcutta for almost fifteen years, from 1866 to 1881. In 1870, he became the first Odia to complete his B.A . He continued his studies at Calcutta and earned his M.A. in 1873, and an LL.B degree in 1878, thus becoming the first scholar from Odisha to be thus educated.

== Professional life ==
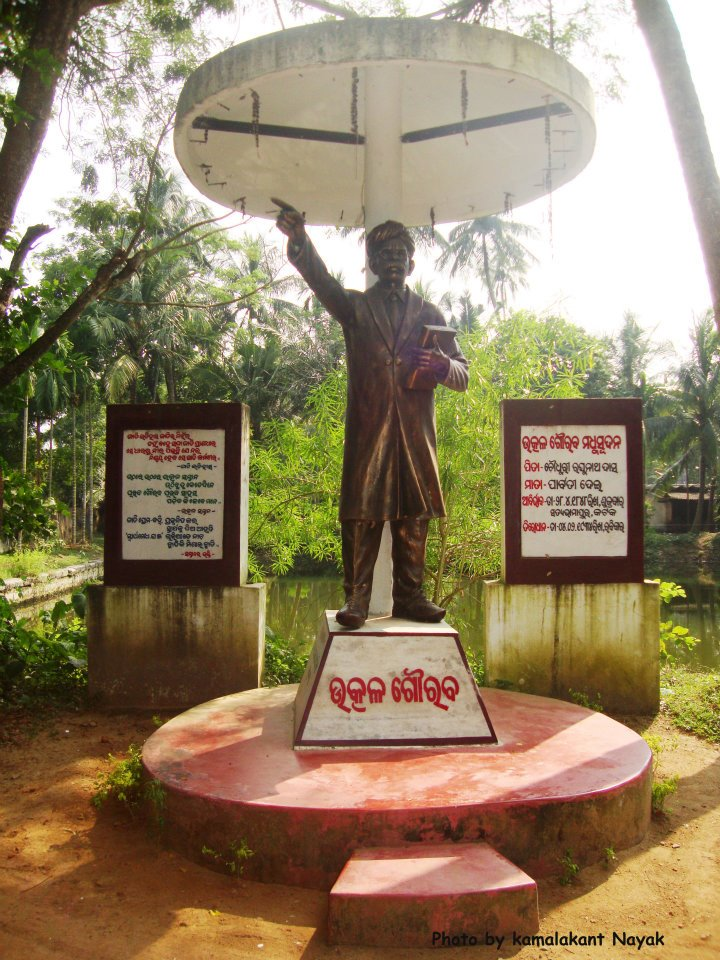
Statue of Madhu babu

After returning to Odisha from Calcutta in 1881, he started his legal practice. His insight knowledge on this field helped him to earn sufficiently and spend for the common man. He handled some important cases of his times such as Puri temple administration case, Keonjhar Riots Case etc. He was a source of inspiration for the lawyers in Orissa and in India. His birth anniversary is observed as Lawyers' Day in Odisha.

== Political career ==
Known as 'Madhu Babu' by the common people, he worked for the political, social and economical upliftment of the people of Odisha and worked as a entrepreneur, businessman, lawyer, journalist, legislator, politician and social reformer. He was associated with the Indian National Congress between 1886 and 1903. He found the Utkal Sabha in 1888 which became the provincial unit of the Indian National Congress in the same year. He later founded Utkal Sammilani which brought a revolution in the social and industrial development of Orissa. He was elected as a member of the legislative council of Bihar and Orissa Province and under the Diarchy scheme of Government of India Act, 1919, he was appointed as Minister for Local Self-Government, Medical Public Health, Public Works in 1921.

He was the first Odia to become a member of both the legislative council and the Central Legislative Assembly of India. He founded Utkal Sammilani (Utkal Union Conference) which laid the foundation of Odia nationalism. Utkal Sammilani spearheaded the demand for unification of Odia speaking areas under a single administration. This led to the formations of state of Odisha on 1 April 1936. He was also the first Odia to travel to England.

== Business ventures ==
He founded the Utkal Tannery in 1905, a factory producing shoes and other leather products. In 1897 he founded the Odisha Art Ware Works. With his support, the Tarakasi(filigree) work of silver ornaments achieved commendable feet.

== Contribution to literature ==
As a writer and poet, patriotism was always at the forefront of his mind, and that was reflected in all of his literary works. He penned a number of articles and poems in both English and Odia. Some of his important poems are "Utkal Santan", "Jati Itihash" and "Jananira Ukti". He was also an influential speaker in Odia, Bengali and English.

== Death ==
He died on 4 February 1934 at the age of 85.
