= Department of Higher Education (Odisha) =

Higher Education Department, Govt. of Odisha
- Formation: 2010
- Legal status: Active
- Headquarters: Bhubaneswar
- Region served: Odisha
- Official language: Odia
- Key people: Suryabansi Suraj, Minister and Aravind Agarwal, Commissioner-cum-Secretary
- Parent organisation: Government of Odisha
- Website: dhe.odisha.gov.in

Department of Higher Education, Odisha (Odia: ଉଚ୍ଚ ଶିକ୍ଷା ବିଭାଗ, ଓଡ଼ିଶା) is a unit of the Government of Odisha in India that looks after the higher education in the state of Odisha. The department looks after the education curriculum at University, Post-Graduate and Graduate level in the state of Odisha. The department is responsible for hiring and employing teaching staffs in positions of Professor, Associate Professor and Assistant Professor as well as non-teaching staff in Higher Education Institutions running under Government of Odisha. Moreover, it looks after functioning of state run Universities namely Maa Manikeshwari University, Rajendra University, Ravenshaw University, Utkal University, Berhampur University, Sambalpur University, Sri Jagannath Sanskrit Viswavidyalaya, Maharaja Sriram Chandra Bhanja Deo University, Fakir Mohan University, Gangadhar Meher University, Rama Devi Women's University, Khallikote Unitary University, NLUO, Dharanidhar University, Odisha State Open University and Vikram Dev University.

== Facility ==
In the year 2010 Department of Higher Education, Odisha introduced Students Academic Management System also known as (SAMS). This facility is based on e-admission of students seeking admission to ITI/Diploma engineering and non-engineering courses, +2 and +3 courses in various private and government schools, colleges, polytechnics and university in the state of Odisha under Department of Higher Education and skill development in the streams of Arts, Law, Commerce, Science, Craftsmen, ITI training, Diploma and other self finance courses.

DHE Odisha website also enables facility of RTI, e-space, e-dispatch and pool of information resources about staff position and Infrastructure support of various Schools, Colleges and University. E- Dispatch and E- Space are web based facility for receiving Letters, Office Orders, Amendments, and other resources of information of different departments of Government of Odisha.

== See also ==
- Council of Higher Secondary Education, Odisha
- Board of Secondary Education, Odisha
- State Council for Technical Education & Vocational Training
