= Ramadevi Choudhury =

Indian freedom fighter and social reformer (1889–1985)

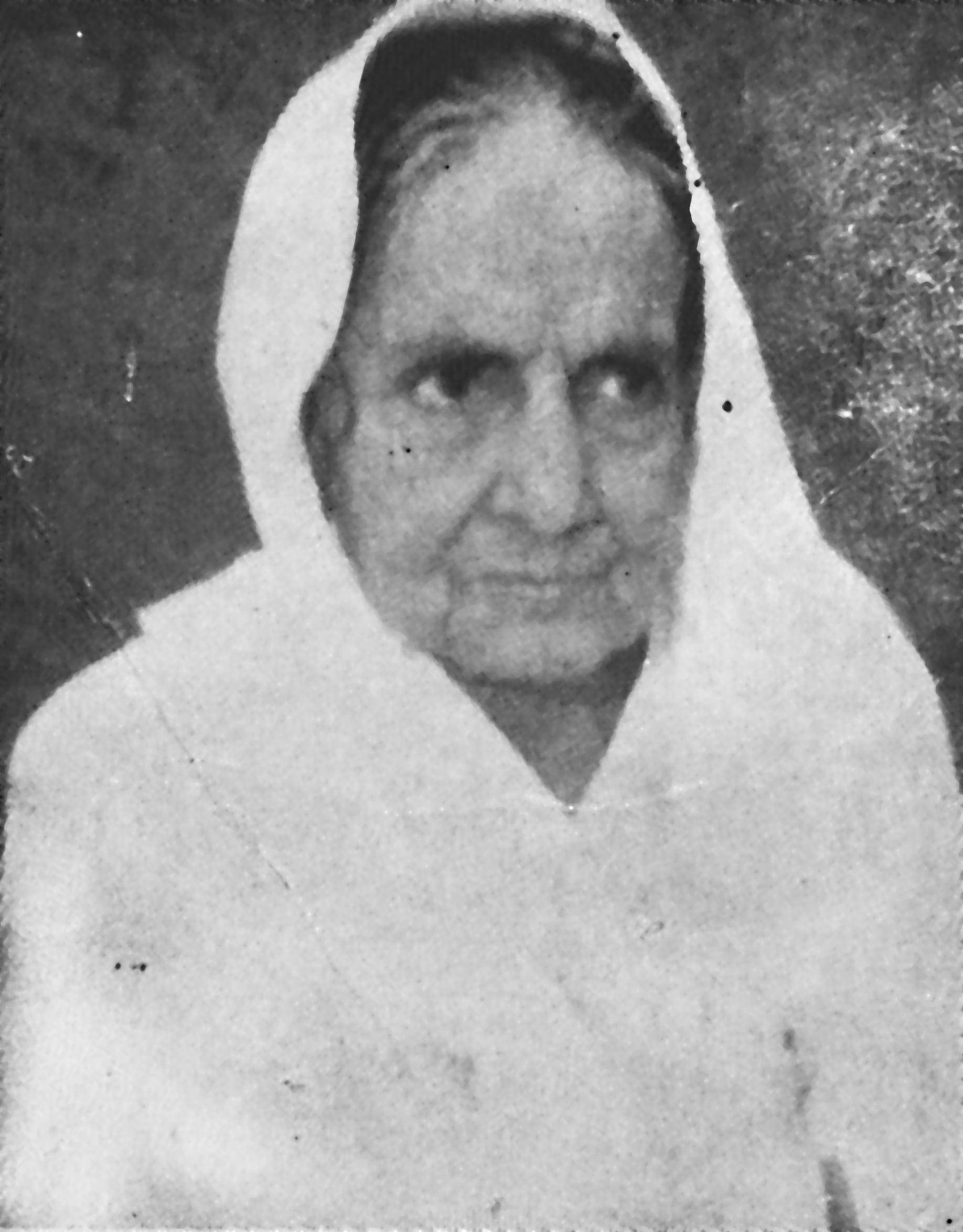
- Born: 3 December 1899; Satyabhamapur, Bengal Presidency, British India
- Died: 22 July 1985 (aged 85); Cuttack, Orissa, India
- Other name: Maa Rama Devi
- Occupations: Indian independence activist, social reformer
- Spouse: Gopabandhu Choudhury
- Parent(s): Gopala Ballabha Das; Basanta Kumari Devi
- Relatives: Uma Devi (sister); Madhusudan Das (uncle); Nabakrushna Choudhury (brother in law)
- Awards: Odisha Sahitya Akademi Award

Ramadevi Choudhury (3 December 1899 – 22 July 1985), also known as Rama Devi, was an Indian freedom fighter and a social reformer. She was called Maa (Mother) by the people of Odisha. The Ramadevi Women's University in Bhubaneswar has been named after her.

== Family ==
She was born in an aristocratic Zamindar Karan family. She was the daughter of Choudhury Gopala Ballabha Das and Basant Kumari Devi and the niece of Utkal Gaurab Madhusudan Das. At the age of 15, she married Gopabandhu Choudhury, then a Deputy Collector.

== Role during independence ==
Together with her husband, she joined the Indian independence movement in 1921. She was highly influenced by Mahatma Gandhi and took an active part in Non Cooperation Movement. She used to go from village to village to encourage women to join the independence movement. Others who influenced her were Jai Prakash Narayan, Vinoba Bhave and her uncle, Madhusudan Das. In 1921, she had her first meeting with Gandhiji and, together with her husband, joined the Non Cooperation Movement. The same year they joined the Indian National Congress and started wearing khadi. In 1930, she took active part in the Salt Satyagraha movement at Orissa level. She went to Inchudi and Srijang, with other activist like Kiranbala Sen, Maltidevi, Sarala Devi, Pranakrushna Padhiari. She and her colleagues were arrested in November 1930 and placed in different jails by the British. She was arrested several times (in 1921, 1930, 1936, 1942) with other women independence activists like Sarala Devi, Malati Choudhury and others and was sent to jail. She attended the 1931 Karachi session of the Indian National Congress and, at that time, requested leaders to hold the next session in Orissa. In 1932 after her release from Hazaribagh jail, she was actively involved in Harijan welfare. She stated the Asprushyata Nibarana Samiti under instructions from Gandhiji, for the eradication of untouchability. The institution was later renamed the Harijan Sewa Sangha. She was closely involved in Gandhiji's 1932 and 1934 visits to Orissa as well as the visits of, Kasturba, Sardar Patel, Rajendra Prasad, Maulana Azad, Jawaharlal Nehru and others. She started an Ashram at Bari, Orissa which Gandhiji named Sewaghar. During the Quit India Movement of 1942, members of Rama Devi's entire family, including her husband, Gopabandhu Choudhury, were arrested. After the death of Kasturba Gandhi, Gandhji assigned her work as the representative of the Orissa chapter of the Kasturba Trust.

== Role after independence of India ==
After the Independence of India in 1947, Rama Devi dedicated herself to the cause of Bhoodan and Gramdan movement of Acharya Vinoba Bhave. In 1952 she along with her husband she travelled on foot about 4000 kilometres across the state to propagate the message of giving land and wealth to the landless and poor. From 1928, Rama Devi stayed in the Alaka Ashram at Jagatsingpur.

She helped set up the Utkal Khadi Mandal and also established a Teachers' Training Centre and Balwadi at Ramchandrapur. In 1950 she set up a Tribal Welfare Centre at Dumburugeda. During the 1951 famine she and Malati worked in famine relief in Koraput. She worked to aid soldiers affected by the Indo-Chinese War of 1962.

During the Emergency she protested by bringing out her own newspaper along with Harekrushna Mahatab and Nilamani Routray. The Gram Sevak Press, was banned by the government and was arrested along with other leaders from Orissa like Nabakrushna Choudhury, Harekrushna Mahatab, Manmohan Chowdhury, Smt. Annapurna Moharana, Jaykrushana Mohanty, and others.

She established a primary school, Shishu Vihar and a cancer hospital at Cuttack.

== Honours ==
In recognition of her services to the nation, Ramadevi was awarded the Jamnalal Bajaj Award on 4 November 1981 and the Doctor of Philosophy (Honoris causa) by Utkal University on 16 April 1984.

== Memorials ==
Rama Devi Women's University at Bhubaneshwar is named in her memory. It is the first women's university in eastern India, established as such since 2015. There is a museum dedicated to her within the university premises. The school – Shishu Vihar – started by her at Cuttack is now named Ramadevi Shishu Vihar.

== Death ==
She died on 22 July 1985 at the age of 85.
