= Hannah Sen =

Indian educator, politician, and feminist

- Born: 1894; Calcutta, British India
- Died: 1957 (aged 62–63)
- Education: Pratt Memorial School, Diocesan College, Calcutta University, University of London
- Occupations: Social workers, politicians, activists
- Known for: Founders & First Director of Lady Irwin College
- Relatives: Regina Guha

Hannah Sen (1894–1957) was an Indian educator, politician, and feminist. She was a member of the first Indian Rajya Sabha (upper house of Parliament) from 1952 to 1957 and the president of the All India Women's Conference in 1951–52. She was a founder and the first director of Lady Irwin College in Delhi. She also represented India at the UN Commission on the Status of Women and at UNESCO, and was an advisor to the Indian government on the rehabilitation of women and children refugees after the Partition of India.

== Life and education ==
Hannah Sen was born Hannah Guha, to Pearay Mohan Guha (a lawyer) and Simcha Gubbay, a Baghdadi Jewish woman. Her father later converted to Judaism as well, and Hannah and her three siblings were raised in the Jewish faith. Hannah's sister, Regina Guha, also trained as a lawyer, and fought the first case in India to allow women to enroll as lawyers. In 1925, Hannah married Satish Chandra Sen, a radiologist from Mumbai. They had one daughter, Shanta, who was educated in India and later at Bryn Mawr College.

== Career ==
Sen was educated in Kolkata, studying at the Pratt Memorial School and Diocesan College. She earned a Bachelor of Arts and a Bachelor of Law from Calcutta University, with a first class distinction in both degrees. Sen took up several teaching appointments after completing her education, teaching at the Jewish Girls' School in Calcutta, where her sister Regina Guha was the principal, and later becoming the principal of a girls' school in Mumbai in 1922.

After her marriage in 1925, she travelled with her husband to England, where they both pursued graduate education. Sen earned a Teachers' Diploma from the University of London, and continued on there as a Research Fellow, working with psychologist and professor Charles Spearman. While in London, Sen publicly advocated for women's education, and delivered a speech to members of the British Parliament, on the challenges and conditions faced by women in India. She was closely involved with the British Commonwealth League in London as well as the International Women's Suffrage Alliance, and in 1929, was a founder of the Indo-British Mutual Welfare League, a women's organization that established a network of British and Indian suffragists involved in educational projects.

Sen was persuaded to return to India by politician and poet, Sarojini Naidu, to assist in efforts to promote women's education and to participate in the Indian independence movement. She helped to establish the Lady Irwin College in Delhi in 1932, and served as the director of the college until her retirement in 1947. An existing building on the grounds of Lady Irwin College is named after Hannah Sen. During riots in Delhi while the Partition of India was underway, she opened the grounds of the Lady Irwin College to shelter Muslim and Sikh students from rioting Hindu mobs, despite facing threats against herself for doing so.

In 1948, Sen was part of a committee constituted to advise the Government of India on the improvement of secondary education in the country. Between 1952 and 1957, she was a member of the first Rajya Sabha, the upper house in India's Parliament. She was also invited to act as an advisor to the independent Indian government's Ministry of Relief and Rehabilitation, along with politician Rameshwari Nehru and Manmohini Zutshi Sahgal. She assisted the ministry with rehabilitation efforts directed at women and child refugees following the Partition of India. She was also active within the All India Women's Conference and from 1951 to 1952 served as its president. Sen was an associate of several leaders in the Indian independence movement, and was closely involved with the organisation and planning of the funeral of Mahatma Gandhi, notably intervening when mourners objected to American photographer Margaret Bourke-White's photography of the funeral. Sen escorted Bourke-White from the funeral and requested her to refrain from using flash photography to prevent disruption of the funeral. Bourke-White did not honor Sen's request, and was eventually required to leave the funeral.

After her retirement from teaching, Sen also participated in international feminist organizations and initiatives. She was an observer at the All India Conference of Social Work in New York, 1948, and represented Indian interests at the United Nations Commissions on the Status of Women in 1950–51. She was also part of the Indian delegation to the International Union for Child Welfare, in London, 1950, and a member of the Indian delegation to UNESCO in Paris, 1951. Sen was also closely involved with the Jewish community in Delhi, and donated funds for the establishment of a synagogue in Delhi.
