= Sailabala Das =

Indian social worker and politician

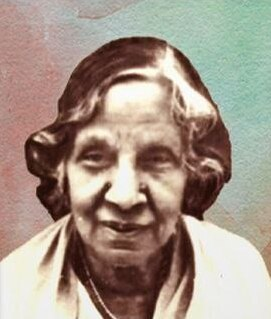

Member: Rajya Sabha
- In office 03 April 1952 – 02 April 1954
- Constituency: Odisha

Personal details
- Born: Shoila Bala Hazra; 25 March 1875 Chakraberia Road, Bhowanipore, Calcutta
- Died: 29 April 1968 (aged 93)
- Party: Indian National Congress
- Education: Bethune College, Maria Grey Training College
- Profession: Educationist, Social Worker, Politician

Sailabala Das (25 March 1875 – 29 April 1968) was a social worker and politician. She was the first woman from Odisha to go to England for higher studies.

== Life ==
Sailabala Das, eldest child of Ambica Charan Hazra and Prosannamayee, was born on 25 March 1875 at the Bhowanipore (Calcutta) house of Madhusudan Das. She had five siblings. Following her mother's death, she was adopted by Madhusudan Das.

In 1903, she formed the Utkal Young Men's Association and managed the Utkal Young Women's Association. She was instrumental in creation of the first women's college in Odisha, the main building of which was gifted by her. She started a Hindu widows' training school to train widows to become high school teachers. On the political front, she started several branches of All-India Women's Conference. She established Orissa Nari Seba Sangha in 1941 for social welfare of women. Indian National Council for Women held its biennial conference in Cuttack, under her leadership.

She extended her reach to Bihar, where she became the first woman inspector of prison cells in Patna, first woman to join the management committee of the Prince of Wales Medical College and a Syndicate member of Patna University. Sailabala became the first woman Honorary Magistrate of India, adjudicating over 600 cases a year.

In recognition of her contribution to education, Sir Edward Albert Gait, the last Lieutenant Governor of Orissa and Bihar, wanted to confer the Kaisar-i-Hind gold medal to her but she declined it.

Shailabala Women's College, Cuttack is named after her.

== Literary works ==
- A look After and Before – autobiography (1956)
- Tribute of a Daughter to Her Father (2008)
