= Rama Devi Women's University =

Public women's university in Bhubaneswar, Odisha

- Motto: सा विद्या या विमुक्तये (Sanskrit)
- Motto in English: It is knowledge that liberates
- Type: Public
- Established: 1964; 62 years ago (as college); 2015; 11 years ago (as university)
- Affiliations: UGC, NAAC
- Chancellor: Governor of Odisha
- Vice-Chancellor: Jyotsna K. B. Rout
- Students: 1,060
- Undergraduates: 689
- Postgraduates: 371
- Location: Bhubaneswar, Odisha, India; 20.29263°N 85.841589°E
- Campus: 28 acres (110,000 m^{2}) Urban
- Website: rdwu.ac.in

Rama Devi Women's University, formerly known as Rama Devi Women's Autonomous College, is a state university for women in Bhubaneswar, Odisha, India named after freedom fighter and social reformer Ramadevi Choudhury.

== History ==
The institution started as Government Women's College in 1964 in a small building of the Labour Department of the Government of Odisha and was affiliated to Utkal University at that time.

The college was later shifted to the Old School Building of Unit-1, Bhubaneswar in 1966 and ultimately to the present campus near Rupali Square of Bhubaneswar (present University campus) on 1 January 1969.

The name of the college was changed to Rama Devi Women's College in 1969 and was given Autonomous status on 19 June 1999.

Higher Secondary wing of Rama Devi Women's Autonomous College was separated from the Autonomous College from 2001.

The college was accredited by NAAC with grade 'A' on 16 September 2004. It was reaccredited with an 'A' grade again in February 2015. In 2010, it was given CPE (College with Potential for Excellence) Status by UGC.

On its Golden Jubilee celebration, former President of India Pranab Mukherjee attended as the Chief Guest in its Inaugural function on 30 November 2014.

Under the RUSA scheme the college was upgraded to the Status of a Women's University on 30 May 2015. As an affiliating University, 46 Women's Colleges under Utkal University came under the jurisdiction of the new university. Naveen Patnaik, the then Chief Minister of Odisha, officially inaugurated the university in a ceremony held on 3 December 2015 coinciding with the birth day of Maa Ramadevi Choudhury.

On 1 July 2021, the university was accorded with 12(B) status by UGC.

== Academics ==
The university has respective departments under its seven schools. It offers various undergraduate, postgraduate and Ph.D courses.

- School of Biotechnology
  - Department of Biotechnology
- School of Life Sciences
  - Department of Life Science
  - Department of Botany
  - Department of Zoology
- School of Physical & Mathematical Sciences
  - Department of Physics
  - Department of Chemistry
  - Department of Computer Science
  - Department of Mathematics
  - Department of Statistics
- School of Commerce, Management & Communication
  - Department of Commerce
  - Department of Business Administrative
  - Department of Journalism & Mass Communication
- School of Pedagogical Science
  - Department of Education
- School of Languages Literature & Culture
  - Department of English
  - Department of Odia
  - Department of Sanskrit
  - Department of Hindi
  - Department of Music
- School of Social Sciences & Humanities
  - Department of Gender Studies
  - Department of Economics
  - Department of Home Science
  - Department of History
  - Department of Philosophy
  - Department of Sociology
  - Department of Political Science
  - Department of Psychology
  - Department of NCC

== Notable alumni ==
- Droupadi Murmu, 15th President of India.
- Valena Valentina, Indian karate player
- Anu Choudhury, actress

== See also ==
- Department of Higher Education (Odisha)
