= De Keyser =

De Keyser is a Dutch surname mostly found in Flanders. Among variant forms are de Keijser, de Keijzer, De Keyzer, Dekeijser, DeKeyser, Dekeyser and Dekeyzer. It translates to "the emperor". People with this name include:

- Alexei de Keyser (1967–2004), British television producer
- David de Keyser (1927–2021), British actor
- Désiré De Keyser (1823–1897), Belgian architect
- Eugénie De Keyser (1918–2012), Belgian art historian
- Ethel de Keyser (1926–2004), South African anti-apartheid activist
- Harry de Keijser (1900–1995), Dutch pole vaulter and decathlete
- Hendrick de Keyser (1565–1621), Dutch sculptor and architect
- Jean-Pierre de Keyser, (born 1965) German footballer
- Marie De Keyser (1815–1879), Belgian genre and history painter
- Merten de Keyser (died 1536) French painter and publisher working in Antwerp
- Nicaise de Keyser (1813–1873), Belgian painter
- Paul De Keyser (born 1957), Belgian racing cyclist
- Pieter de Keyser (1595–1676), Dutch architect and sculptor, son of Hendrick
- Polydore de Keyser (1832–1918), British lawyer
- Raoul De Keyser (1930–2012), Belgian painter
- Thomas de Keyser (1596–1667), Dutch painter and architect, son of Hendrick
- Véronique De Keyser (born 1945), Belgian politician
- Willem de Keyser (architect) (1603-after 1674), Dutch architect and painter, son of Hendrick
- Willem de Keyser (painter) (1647–1692), Flemish painter

De Keyzer

- Bruno de Keyzer (1949–2019), French cinematographer
- Carl De Keyzer (born 1958), Belgian photographer
- Dirk De Keyzer (born 1958), Belgian sculptor
- Gerd de Keijzer (born 1992), Dutch racing cyclist
- Jack de Keyzer (born 1955), British-born Canadian blues musician

Concatenated:

- André Dekeijser (1924–2013), Belgian contemporary sculptor
- Carole Dekeijser (1959–2008), Belgian illustrator, painter and philosopher
- Danny DeKeyser (born 1990), American ice hockey player
- Dawn DeKeyser, American television writer and producer
- Giovanni Dekeyser (born 1976), Belgian field hockey player
- Jérôme Dekeyser (born 1983), Belgian field hockey player
- Pierre Louis Dekeyser (1914–1984), French zoologist
  - Dekeyser's nectar bat, South American bat named after him
- Robert Dekeyser (born 1964), Belgian-German entrepreneur
- Roger Dekeyzer (1906–1992), Belgian syndicalist and politician
- Rudy Dekeyser (born 1976), Belgian molecular biologist and businessman
- Tracey DeKeyser (born 1990), American ice hockey player and coach

== See also ==
- Keyser (disambiguation)
- Keijzer
- Keizer (surname)
- De Keyser's Royal Hotel
