= Kaijser =

Kaijser is a surname. Notable people with the surname include:

- Arne Kaijser (born 1950), Swedish professor
- Olof Kaijser (1914–2002), Swedish diplomat
- Simon Kaijser (born 1969), Swedish director

== See also ==
- Kaiser
- Kayser
- Keizer
- Keyser
- Kyser
