= Kayser =

Kayser is a derivation of the Germanic Kaiser surname, and may refer to:

- Kayser (surname)
- Kayser (band), a Swedish thrash metal band
- Kayser (unit) in spectroscopy, equal to reciprocal centimeter
- Käyser Airstrip, small airport in Suriname
- Kayser Mountain, Hall Land, Greenland
- Käyser Mountains, Sipaliwini, Suriname
- Kayser Sung, Asian journalist
- Kayser–Fleischer ring, a dark ring that appears to encircle the iris of the eye
- Kayser-Roth, a manufacturer of hosiery and intimate apparel
- Kayser-Threde, a company in Munich, Germany, developing equipment for astronautics, science and industry
- George R. Kayser House, Arizona, United States
- Kayser's Beach, a village in South Africa
- Kayser, a unit of wavenumber in the CGS system, named after Heinrich Kayser

== See also ==
- Kaiser (disambiguation)
- Kyser, a surname
