= Keidser =

Keidser is a surname and "soldier name" originally from Scania in Sweden. Bearers of the family name now live all over the world, notably in Sweden, Denmark, United States and Australia.

== Origin ==
The first bearer of the name was Johan Persson Kediser (born 1871 and dead 1930) who was a Swedish soldier at Hoby Company in the Scanian Hussar Regiment. As part of the allotment system his croft (in Swedish: "Soldattorp") belonged to (and was financed by) Åkerlund Rote in Uppåkra Socken. He joined the military in 1890 and was honorably discharged in 1912. In the military service he was given the name Keidser and he later took that as his family name, passing it on to his children. The name is as such classified as a Swedish "soldier name".

Swedish military names are usually descriptive in nature (quick, hard, tall, brave, drunkard etc.) or related to tools of war (sword, spear, shield, helmet, dagger, cannon etc.). However the name Keidser is none of that. Soldier names could also typically derive from the name of the Rote they were outfitted by, and as such the name usually followed the croft. Similar Swedish soldier names (Kejser, Keiser etc.) has been derived from Rote names that has the Swedish word for emperor (Swedish: Kejsare) as part of the name, like "Kejsarkulla" (meaning "Emperor hill"). However that does not seem to be the case here either as the Rote is called Åkerlund (meaning "field grove"). Johan Persson is also the only soldier in Sweden that have been given that particular name, according to searches in the Central Soldier Register. In these regards the name is unique.

One can only speculate why he was given that particular name as no known sources remain to tell reasoning behind the name. However the pronunciation of it in the Scanian dialect is strikingly close to the German surname Kaiser and/or the Dutch surname Keizer, both deriving from the German imperial title Kaiser. Even if the name did derive from the German title Kaiser the reason why Johan Persson was given that name remains a mystery. Perhaps an officer thought he looked like the Kaiser at the time or perhaps an officer thought him arrogant like an emperor - who knows.

All who bear the name today, alone or in conjugation with another surname, are descendants of Johan Persson Kediser, have married someone who is or is adopted by someone who is. Except for one; who got the name when his mother married a man named Keidser and chose to keep it after their divorce even though his mother did not.

== Notable people with the surname Keidser ==
- Curt Keidser, American drummer
- Gitte Keidser, Danish/Australian Senior Researcher and Professor, focusing in Hearing, Hearing loss and Hearing aid.
- Maj Keidser, Swedish politician
- Willy Keidser, Swedish actor
