= Willem de Keyser =

Willem de Keyser may refer to:

- Willem de Keyser (architect) (1603–after 1674), Dutch architect and sculptor
- Willem de Keyser (painter) (c. 1647–1692), Flemish painter
