= Kayser (surname) =

Kayser is a surname derived from the German imperial title Kaiser (English: emperor). The title Kaiser is in turn derived from the Latin title Caesar, which again is a derivation from the personal name of a branch of the gens (clan) Julia, to which belonged Gaius Julius Caesar, the forebear of the first Roman imperial family. The further etymology is unclear.

Other names with the same origin are Kaiser and Keiser, and Kiser; Keyser is more common as a Dutch spelling, Kiser is more common in Sweden and the United States, and Qaisar is an Arabic version.

- Adolph H. Kayser (1851–1925), Mayor of Madison, Wisconsin, United States
- Albert Kayser (1898–1944), German politician
- Allan Kayser (born 1963), American actor
- Alois Kayser (1877–1944), German missionary
- Benjamin Kayser (born 1984), French rugby player
- Bernhard Kayser (1869–1954), German ophthalmologist.
- Carl Gangolf Kayser (1837–1895), Austrian architect
- Charles Edmond Kayser (1882–1965), French painter
- Charles Willy Kayser (1881–1942), German film actor
- Emanuel Kayser (1845–1927), German geologist
- Éric Kayser (born 1964), French baker and food writer
- Fredrik Kayser (1918–2009), Norwegian resistance member during World War II
- Fredrik A. Kayser (1924–1968), Norwegian furniture designer
- Heinrich Kayser (1853–1940), German physicist
- Heinrich Ernst Kayser (1815–1888), German violin pedagogue
- Heinrich Wilhelm Ferdinand Kayser (1833–1919), mine manager in Tasmania, Australia
- Hugo von Kayser (1873–1949), German general
- Karl Ludwig Kayser (1808–1872), German philologist and classical scholar
- Leif Kayser (1919–2001), Danish composer and organist
- Mark Kayser, American TV personality
- Max Kayser (1853–1888), German politician
- Max Kayser (musician) (born 1918), German violinist
- Oliver Kayser (born 1973), Austrian fencer
- Ralph Kayser German medical specialist in orthopedics
- Renato Kayser (born 1996), Brazilian football player
- Robert Kayser (1805–1877), German industrialist and banker
- Tony Kayser, American politician
