= Jim Carrey's artwork =

Jim Carrey's artwork includes paintings, sculptures, mixed-media pieces and satirical drawings. Carrey developed an interest in visual art during his childhood, but mostly set his artistic pursuits aside during the height of his acting career before resuming them more seriously around 2010–2011. In 2011, he held his first solo exhibition, featuring approximately forty paintings, sculptures and mixed-media pieces.

Following the 2016 United States presidential election, Carrey began posting satirical drawings that criticised Donald Trump and his first administration. He also directed his satire towards Republican politicians, the National Rifle Association and authoritarian leaders abroad. His political cartoons were shown in the exhibitions IndigNATION in 2018 and This Light Never Goes Out in 2019.

== Early artistic practice ==
Jim Carrey developed an interest in visual art during his childhood, frequently sketching and drawing cartoons both at home and in school. From the ages of five to ten, Carrey spent much of his time alone in his bedroom drawing. In later interviews, he linked his adult studio practice to that period, describing himself as still being "an eight-year-old in [his] room".

While attending Catholic school, Carrey sketched a picture of Jesus in art class in third or fourth grade; he later recalled that it was ruined in a mud puddle during a fight with classmates. In sixth grade, a teacher confiscated cartoons he drew in the back of class that depicted her being "mutilated by bombs and axes". She later returned them after he became famous, saying she had been saving them because she knew "something was going on there".

During a 1995 Rolling Stone interview, Carrey discussed his childhood interest in visual art, likening his concentration to "being in the womb" and stating that interruptions would make him "go insane". He won several local art exhibitions with these early drawings; though more realistic than his later surreal art, they still featured dark themes, including a portrait of his father holding a gun titled Waiting to Die.

== Return to painting ==
Carrey mostly set his artistic pursuits aside during the height of his acting career, before resuming them more seriously around 2010–2011 following his breakup with actress Jenny McCarthy. Operating largely in private out of a converted pool house at his Brentwood, Los Angeles, home and a secondary studio in New York City, he produced hundreds of expressive, non-political works. In 2011, Carrey held his first solo exhibition, titled Nothing to See Here, at Heather James Fine Art in Palm Desert, California, featuring approximately forty paintings, sculptures, and mixed-media pieces.

In the years that followed, his home gradually filled with hundreds of large canvases, with Carrey later noting that the paintings had become "part of the furniture." He adopted a more physical approach to his work, using bright, bold colors and pouring paint directly onto massive surfaces, at times crawling across the canvases. The six-minute documentary I Needed Color, directed by David Bushell and released in August 2017, introduced Carrey's work to a widespread audience. Uploaded to Vimeo, the film showcased Carrey's intensive painting process and creative philosophy, quickly going viral and amassing millions of views. The documentary's viral success preceded Carrey's second solo exhibition, titled Sunshower, which opened at Signature Galleries in Las Vegas in September 2017.

== Political art ==
Carrey (left, in 2010) made Donald Trump (right, in 2018) and his administration the primary focus of his grotesque, satirical cartoons during Trump's first presidential term.

Following the 2016 United States presidential election, Carrey began posting satirical drawings on Twitter that sharply criticized Donald Trump and his first administration, marking his shift from private studio painting to public political art. Over the course of the first Trump presidency, Carrey produced dozens of caricatures of the president, often drawing on horror and fantasy motifs to portray him as a destructive force. Recurring visual metaphors in the series included depictions of Trump as a literal monster, a cyclops, and the Wicked Witch of the West. Carrey stated that these depictions were intended to reflect what he viewed as the president's lack of moral vision. To match the rapid pace of the 24-hour news cycle, Carrey traded the massive canvases of his earlier work for quicker mediums, frequently producing his cartoons digitally on an iPad Pro or with markers and ink on paper. This method allowed him to react to political events and share his commentary almost instantaneously.

Carrey also frequently targeted members of Trump's inner circle and key Republican allies, producing notable caricatures of figures such as White House Press Secretary Sarah Huckabee Sanders, senior advisor Steve Bannon, and Senate Majority Leader Mitch McConnell. These secondary targets were often depicted alongside Trump as symbols of complicity, hypocrisy, or institutional power within the Republican Party. Carrey also directed his satire toward broader targets and global issues, frequently targeting the National Rifle Association in response to mass shootings, Republican politicians, and authoritarian leaders abroad. Notable examples included a drawing of Senator Marco Rubio with "blood on his hands" after the 2018 Parkland high school shooting, as well as critical portraits of Russian President Vladimir Putin, North Korean leader Kim Jong Un and Facebook CEO Mark Zuckerberg.

== Exhibitions ==
=== IndigNATION (2018) ===
In early 2018, gallerist Michele Maccarone discovered Carrey's satirical cartoons on Twitter, stating she was "totally captivated" by them. She reached out to arrange a studio visit that spring, and—citing an "immediate impulse" and the urgency of the pieces—offered him a solo exhibition after seeing the work in person. Although initially announced as a smaller collection, the final installation featured 108 original drawings rendered in acrylic and paint marker alongside a single painting.

The exhibition, titled IndigNATION: Political Cartoons by Jim Carrey, 2016–2018, opened at Maccarone in Los Angeles in late October 2018 and ran through early December, deliberately timed to coincide with the 2018 United States midterm elections.

=== This Light Never Goes Out (2019) ===
In June 2019, Carrey opened his next major political art exhibition, titled This Light Never Goes Out, at the PHI Centre in Montreal. The exhibition featured more than 50 of Carrey's political cartoons created in response to the Trump administration.

== Reception ==
Critics characterized Carrey's visual style as grotesque, noting his use of bold colors and unflattering caricatures.
