= Victor Kord =

American painter and educator

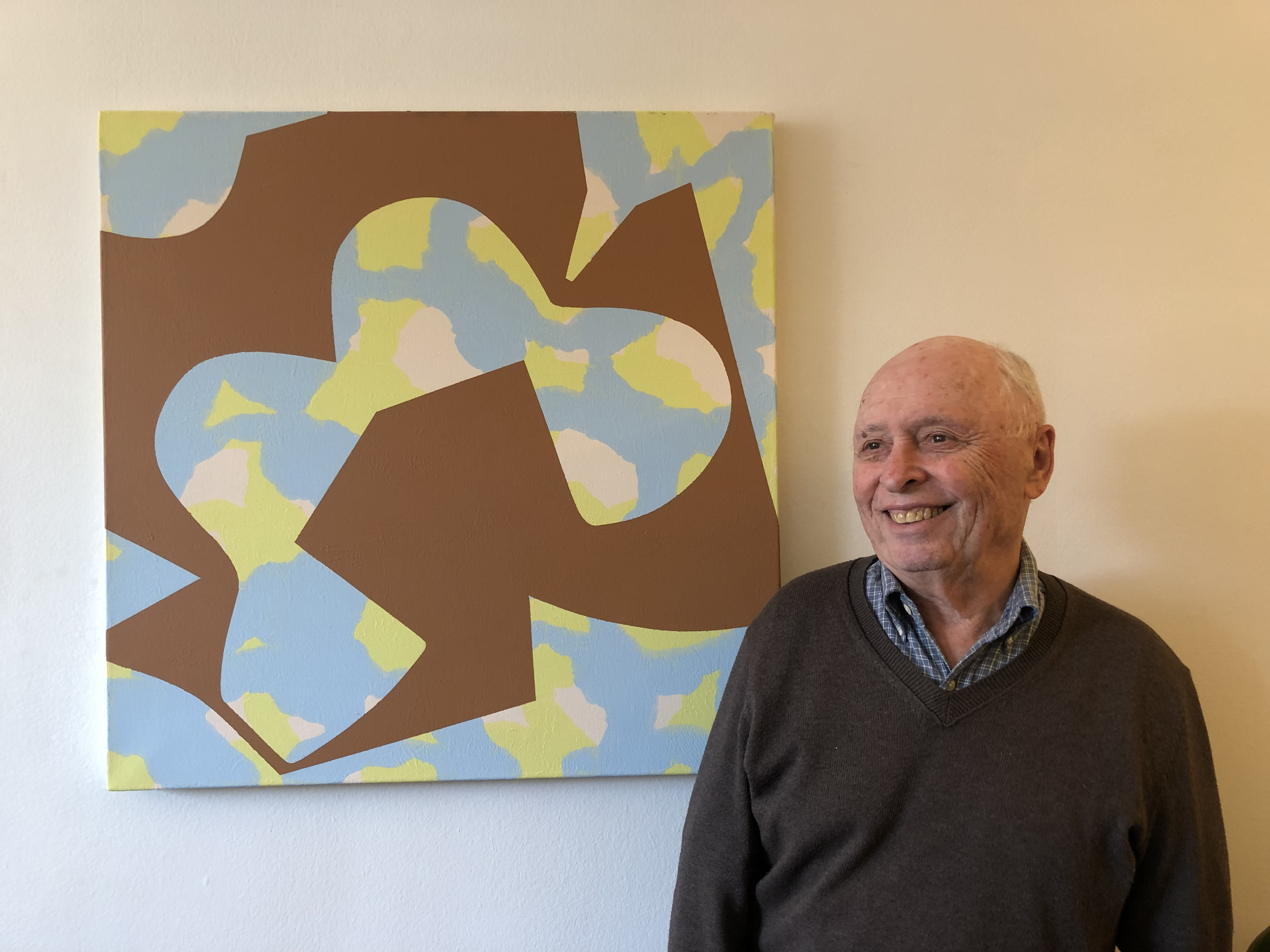
- Victor Kord and a painting from 'Making Ends Meet: New Works, 2019' at June Kelly Gallery
- Born: Victor George Katz; 1935 (age 90–91); Satu Mare, Romania
- Education: Yale University
- Known for: Painter, Educator

Victor George Kord (born 1935) is an American painter and educator. He currently maintains a studio and exhibits in New York City. He previously served as art department chair for several major universities, and remains professor emeritus of painting at Cornell University Department of Art.

== Early life ==
Kord was born Victor George Katz in Satu Mare, Romania. The family immigrated to Canada to avoid the threat of war in 1938. They moved to Ukiah, California in 1943 and the family name changed to Kord. They subsequently moved to Cleveland, Ohio, in 1945.

Kord graduated from the Cleveland Institute of Art in 1957 where he studied with Louis Bosa, was friends with Julian Stanczak and was mentored by Richard Anuszkiewicz. He then studied at Yale School of Art with Joseph Albers and James Brooks, receiving a Bachelor of Fine Art in 1958 and a Master of Fine Art in 1960.

== Career ==
=== Educator ===
Kord taught painting at four different universities beginning as instructor at the Department of Art, University of Illinois at Urbana–Champaign, from 1960 to 1965, where he taught watercolor to architects and drawing and design to art students.

From 1965 to 1981, he served as professor of painting at the Department of Art, University of Wisconsin–Madison, taking the position of chair between 1979 and 1981. He taught painting to undergraduate and graduates and introduced the course based on Alber's method of color interaction.

He moved to Richmond, Virginia to become chair and professor at the Department of Painting and Printmaking at Virginia Commonwealth University, from 1981 through 1987.

His final professorship began in 1987 at Cornell University's Department of Art in Ithaca, New York. He continued as department chair until 1993 and retired Professor Emeritus in 2005. Rosy Keyser, a New York artist who studied with Kord at Cornell, said that "his work exemplified the freedom to attribute abstract ideas to firmly planted materials."

He helped to sponsor many visiting artists to art departments. Richard Artschwager, an early collaborator and lifelong friend, included Kord in the catalogue of his Whitney Museum retrospective. In a conceptual work shown at William Wegman's 2015 Brooklyn Museum retrospective, Kord appeared in Five Figures at Six Feet, 1969.

In 2019 Kord was invited to participate on the "Longevity to Legacy Panel" at the annual College Art Association conference.

=== Painter ===
In 1971 early in his career, Kord was included in the exhibition "Lyrical Abstraction" curated by Larry Aldrich at the Aldrich Museum in Ridgefield, Connecticut. The exhibition was shown again at the Whitney Museum of American Art in New York City to note Lyrical Abstraction as a trend in abstraction away from minimal and hard-edge to a softer, more sensuous form of painting. Aldrich said about the American lyrical artists he discovered, "The artist's touch is always visible in this type of painting, even when the paintings are done with spray guns, sponges or other objects."

Carter Ratcliffe considered the Lyrical Abstraction movement to be revisionist, or in his words, "The happy dazzle of their colors could looked pedantic. . . (however) a few tagged with this label – John Torreano, Victor Kord, Philip Wofford, John Seery – turned out to be good painters."

Much of Kord's painting practice was during his academic appointments. In 1967 he received a faculty fellowship from the University of Wisconsin to work in Paris where he exhibited at Galerie Mathias-Fels.

From 1970 to 1973 he took a leave of absence from the University of Wisconsin in order to live and work in New York City. In 1970 he had a solo exhibition in Koln, Germany, at Galerie Rolfe Ricke. The next year he was represented by French & Company Gallery and participated in a group exhibition at Andre Emmerich Gallery, both New York City galleries. It was at that point that he became associated with the Lyrical Abstraction group.

Other group exhibitions included New American Abstract Paintings that in 1972 was presented by Vassar College Art Gallery in Poughkeepsie, NY. The exhibition catalogue's introduction mirrors the painterly approach of the Lyrical Abstract movement. ". . .the emphasis placed by artists in this exhibition on textural values is contrasted with the hard, flat, seemingly de-physicalized surfaces which are characteristic of so much recent art."

In 1977 Walker Art Center presented Invitation '77: Ten Painters which featured paintings, drawings, and collages from midwest region artists. It was curated by Lisa Lyons.

As an active member of the artist group American Abstract Artists, Kord participated in many group shows. In 2011 Ivan Karp of OK Harris Gallery curated and presented better and lesser known artists of this group in an exceptionally spacious and well considered exhibition. Along with David Reed and Don Voisine, Barbara A. MacAdam said in ARTnews that "Voisine's thin, vertical Debutante Twist (2009) and Victor Kord's Avon IV (2009), hanging side by side, set off a thoughtful contrast between almost-edgy and almost-lyrical. Kord's painting expresses the interaction between the rational and the poetic, with a rhythmic cursive frieze playing against a soft pattern."

The most definitive of the American Abstract Artist group exhibitions was The Onward of Art: Abstract Artist's 80th Anniversary which took place in 2016 to showcase the vigor and relevance of abstraction in twenty first century America. Its catalogue revisits the organization's extensive history of such well known abstractionists as Mondrian and Albers and places current members within the context, of an abstraction that communicates directly through the eye to reach our intellect and our emotions without words.

Kord's solo exhibitions with the June Kelly Gallery in New York City began in 2008. They include Algorithm and Blues, 2008, with an accompanying essay by Eleanor Heartney, Hiding in Plain Sight, 2011, Cut-Out: New Paintings, 2014, Anonymous Collaborations, 2016, Making Ends Meet: New Works, 2019. A selection of his works is also viewable online at the Artist's Viewing Program of the Drawing Center.

Kord was also active locally in university art communities where he often curated exhibitions of other artists. At the Madison Art Center, Madison, Wisconsin he presented Recent Works on Paper by American Artists: Victor Kord and Joseph Wilfer, catalogue.

== Awards and collections ==
In 1962 Victor Kord received the Guggenheim fellowship, one of the youngest at 26 to receive the award. He maintained a studio at the American Center in Paris, France where he met the critic Max Kozloff, and artists Irving Petlin, Leon Golub, Nancy Spero, Seymour Rosofsky and Pater Saul.

Examples of Kord's art are held in the permanent collections of Ellen Noёl Art Museum, the Cleveland Museum of Art, and Whitney Museum of American Art, Chazen Museum of Art, and Madison Museum of Contemporary Art.
