= Kaiser (surname) =

Kaiser is a surname derived from the German imperial title Kaiser (English: emperor). The title Kaiser is in turn derived from the Latin title Caesar, which again is a derivation from the personal name of a branch of the gens (clan) Julia, to which belonged Gaius Julius Caesar, the forebear of the first Roman imperial family.

The name is not especially frequent (ca. 0.05% in Germany), but it is still ranked 41st in Germany as of 2000). Regions in Germany where it is more frequent are central Germany and the southern half of the Black Forest area, and to a lesser extent Southern Germany. It is also used in Austria and the Czech Republic.

Variation spellings rooted in the Kaiser surname are Kayser, Kaijser, Keiser, Kiser, and Kyser. Dutch cognates of the surname include Keizer, (De) Keijzer, (De) Keyser, and Dekeyser.

== Notable people with the surname ==
- Abraham Kaiser (1852–1912), American businessman and politician
- A. Dale Kaiser (1927–2020), American molecular biologist
- Axel Kaiser (born 1981), Chilean writer and lawyer
- Carl Kaiser (1927–2010), Canadian ice hockey player
- Carlos Kaiser (footballer) (born 1963), Brazilian footballer
- Cecil Kaiser (1916–2011), American baseball player
- David Kaiser (disambiguation), several people
- Elisabeth Kaiser (born 1987), German politician
- Franz Kaiser (1891–1962), German astronomer
- Freddy Kaiser (born 1961), mayor of Mauren
- Frederik Kaiser (1808–1872), Dutch astronomer
- Gabriele Kaiser (active since 1997), German mathematics educator
- Georg Kaiser (1878–1945), German expressionist playwright
- George Kaiser (born 1942), American businessman
- Glenn Kaiser (born 1953), American blues musician
- Gunnar Kaiser (1976–2023), German teacher, writer, political blogger and YouTuber
- Faruk Kaiser (1918–1987), Indian Urdu poet and lyricist
- Henry J. Kaiser (1882–1967), American industrialist
- Henry Kaiser (musician) (born 1952), American musician
- Herbert Kaiser (1916–2003), German fighter pilot
- Hilmar Kaiser, German historian
- Jack Kaiser (1926–2022), American baseball player, coach, and athletic director
- Jakob Kaiser (1888-1961), German politician
- James Kaiser (1929–2020), American electrical engineer
- Johannes Kaiser (Chilean politician) (born 1976), Chilean YouTuber and politician
- Johannes Kaiser (Liechtenstein politician) (born 1958), Liechtenstein politician
- Johannes Kaiser (sprinter) (1936–1996), German sprinter
- John Anthony Kaiser (1932–2000), American Roman Catholic priest
- Joseph Kaiser (disambiguation), several people
- Juan Gaudencio Kaiser (1869–1952), Argentine businessman and politician
- Louise Kaiser (1891–1973), Dutch phonetician and linguist
- Kajetan Georg von Kaiser (1803–1871), German chemist
- Karl Kaiser (1866–1935), Liechtenstein politician
- Kyle Kaiser (born 1996), American racing driver
- Ken Kaiser (1945–2017), American baseball umpire
- Maria Kaiser-Eberle (born 1959), mayor of Ruggell
- Marie-Thérèse Kaiser (born 1996), German politician
- Max Keiser (born 1960), American broadcaster and film maker
- Mehboob Ali Kaiser (born 1958), Indian politician
- Michael Kaiser (born 1953), American arts administrator
- Oldřich Kaiser (born 1955), Czech comedy actor
- Philip Mayer Kaiser (1913–2007), United States diplomat
- Reinhard Keiser (1674–1739), German composer
- Robert Blair Kaiser (1931–2015), American writer and journalist
- Robert G. Kaiser (born 1943), American journalist
- Roland Kaiser (born 1952), German musician
- Roland Kaiser (actor) (1943–1998), German actor
- Rolf-Ulrich Kaiser (born 1943), German record producer
- Rudolf Kaiser (1922–1991), German sailplane designer
- Ruud Kaiser (born 1960), Dutch football player and manager
- S. M. Kaiser, Indian association football player
- Simon Kaiser (politician) (1828–1898), Swiss politician
- Stien Kaiser (1938–2022), Dutch speed skater
- Vanessa Kaiser (born 1978), Chilean politician and academic
- Walter Kaiser Jr. (born 1933), American biblical scholar
- Wyatt Kaiser (born 2002), American ice hockey player
