= Monarch Cycle Manufacturing Company =

American bicycle manufacturer

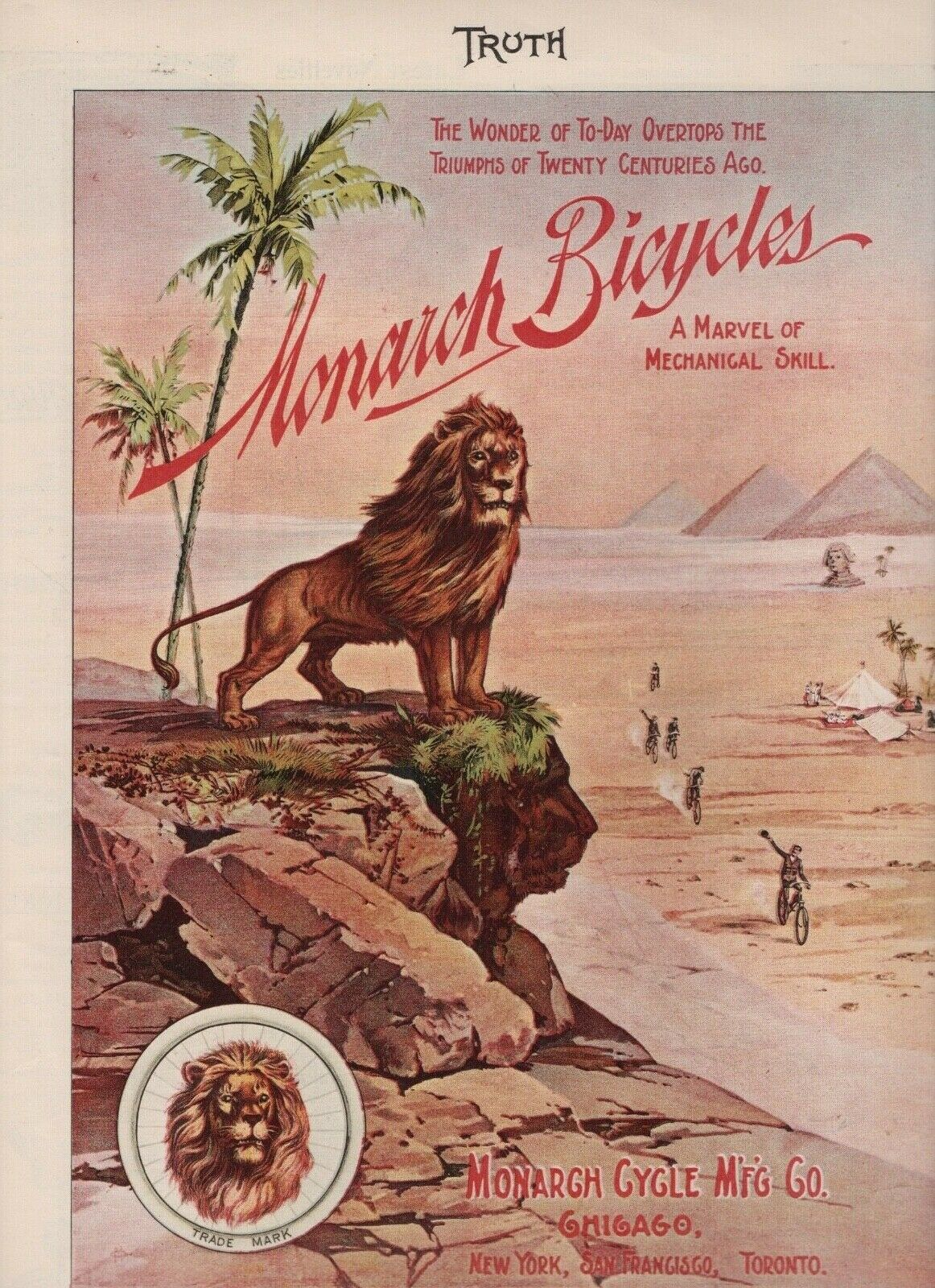
- 1896 print ad
- Industry: Bicycle manufacturing
- Predecessor: Chicago Sewing Machine Company
- Founded: 1892; 134 years ago in Chicago, U.S.
- Founder: John William Kiser
- Defunct: 1899
- Successor: Bicycle Trust
- Headquarters: 42 Halsted Street, Chicago
- Products: Bicycles
- Number of employees: 1200 (1896)

Monarch Cycle Manufacturing Company (1892–1899) was a bicycle manufacturer based in Chicago, Illinois. By 1896 the company became one of the largest manufacturers of bicycles in the world.

== History ==
The company was founded in 1892 by John William Kiser. In 1892, the year the company began, there were 35 employees and the company made 150 bicycles. By 1896 there were 1200 Monarch cycle employees, and they were producing 50,000 bicycles. The company sold bicycles worldwide.

Monarch Cycle produced a chain-less bicycle with a patented two-piece crankshaft.

To promote the company, they sponsored safety bicycle contests for their trick rider Lee Richardson.

In 1899 the company was sold to the Bicycle Trust. The American Bicycle Company only lasted a few years (from 1899-1903). Historians have not determined why the company failed but they have several theories. One idea was that the company was poorly organized, and another theory is that the various manufacturers involved in the company had different objectives. After the breakup the many different companies went back to competing.
