= A Musician and His Daughter =

1629 painting by Thomas de Keyser

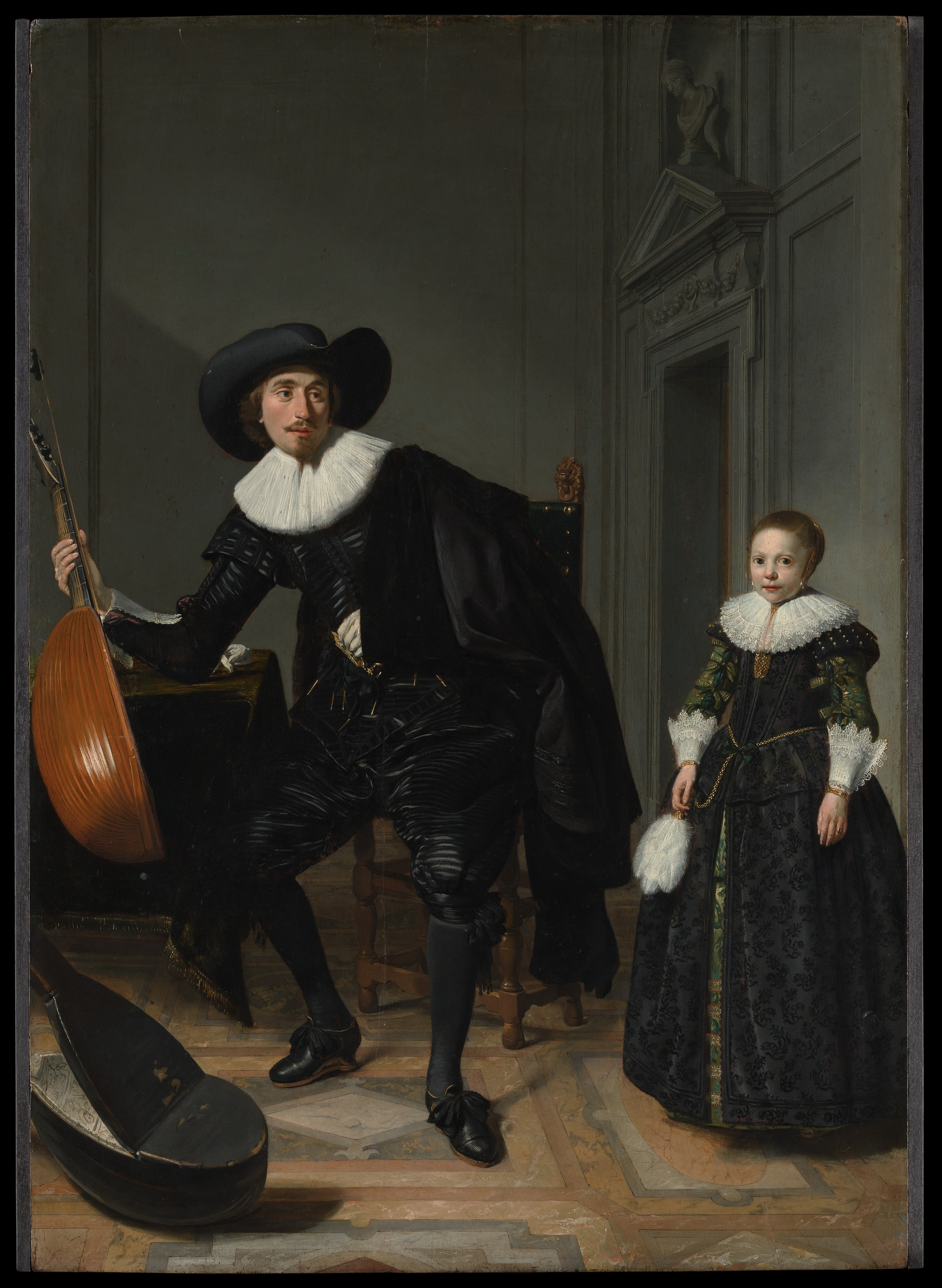
- Artist: Thomas de Keyser
- Year: 1629
- Medium: Oil on wood
- Dimensions: 74.9 cm × 52.7 cm (29.5 in × 20.7 in)
- Location: Metropolitan Museum of Art; New York City

A Musician and His Daughter is a 1629 painting by Dutch portraitist Thomas de Keyser. Done in oil on wood panel, the painting depicts a father and his daughter in their contemporaneously stylish home. The painting is currently in the collection of the Metropolitan Museum of Art.
