= Maccarone (art gallery) =

Art gallery in New York City

Coordinates: 40°43′51″N 74°0′30″W

Maccarone is a contemporary art gallery in the West Village neighborhood of New York City.

== History ==
Founded in 2001 by Michele Maccarone, the gallery opened in an abandoned electronics store at 45 Canal Street. The gallery was among the first to exhibit in Chinatown, and the space allowed for the mounting of several projects historic in scope and unique to the space, including young artists alongside historic figures. For the opening show by Christoph Büchel, visitors had to sign a waiver before crawling through a carved hole in the wall to enter various small rooms, some of which were only four feet high.

In 2007, the gallery moved to the West Village where it inhabits a 6,000 square feet (560 m^{2}) space at 630 Greenwich Street. In 2012, Maccarone took over the lease from a space that had been home to a dry cleaner around the corner but in the same building as her gallery at 630 Greenwich Street.

Between 2005 and 2007, Maccarone presented exhibitions at MC, a project space she operated jointly with the dealer Christian Haye in Culver City. On September 19, 2015 – one day before the scheduled debut of The Broad nearby – Maccarone Los Angeles opened at 300 South Mission Road in Boyle Heights, Los Angeles. Located in an industrial building constructed in 1926 and transformed by Jeffrey Allsbrook and Silvia Kuhle of Los Angeles-based firm Standard, the new space has 50,000 square feet (4,600 m^{2}), including a 15,000 square feet (1,400 m^{2}) vacant lot to show outdoor sculpture.

== Artists ==
- John Divola
- Rosy Keyser
- David Lamelas
- Paul Lee
- Rodney McMillian
- Ryan Sullivan
- Ricky Swallow
- Oscar Tuazon

In addition, the gallery manages various artist estates, including:

- Sarah Charlesworth
- Otto Muehl

In the past, the gallery has worked with the following artists and estates:

- Carol Bove (2011–2023)
- Nate Lowman (–2019)
