= Keizer (surname) =

Keizer is a Dutch surname, meaning "emperor". It is cognate to German Kaiser. Notable people with the surname include:

- Bert Keizer (born 1947), Dutch writer and physician
- Cees Keizer (born 1986), Dutch football midfielder
- Garret Keizer (born 1953), American author
- Gerrit Keizer (1910–1980), Dutch sportsman
- Henry Keizer (born 1960), Dutch businessman and corporate director
- Ilja Keizer (born 1944), Dutch middle-distance runner
- Jan Keizer (referee) (1940–2024), Dutch sports referee
- Jan Keizer (singer) (born 1949), Dutch singer
- Jolanda Keizer (born 1985), Dutch heptathlete
- Joris Keizer (born 1979), Dutch swimmer
- Marcel Keizer (born 1969), Dutch football manager
- Martijn Keizer (born 1988), Dutch racing cyclist
- Nick Keizer (born 1995), American football player
- Piet Keizer (1943–2017), Dutch football left winger
- Sanne Keizer (born 1985), Dutch volleyball player
- Simon Keizer (born 1984), Dutch singer
- Teddy Keizer (born c.1971), American speed hiker
- Keizer Ghidorah (born 2004) kaiju from the Godzilla franchise

== See also ==
- Keizer (disambiguation)
- Keijzer
- Keyser
