= Crackstate =

Stins in Heerenveen, Netherlands

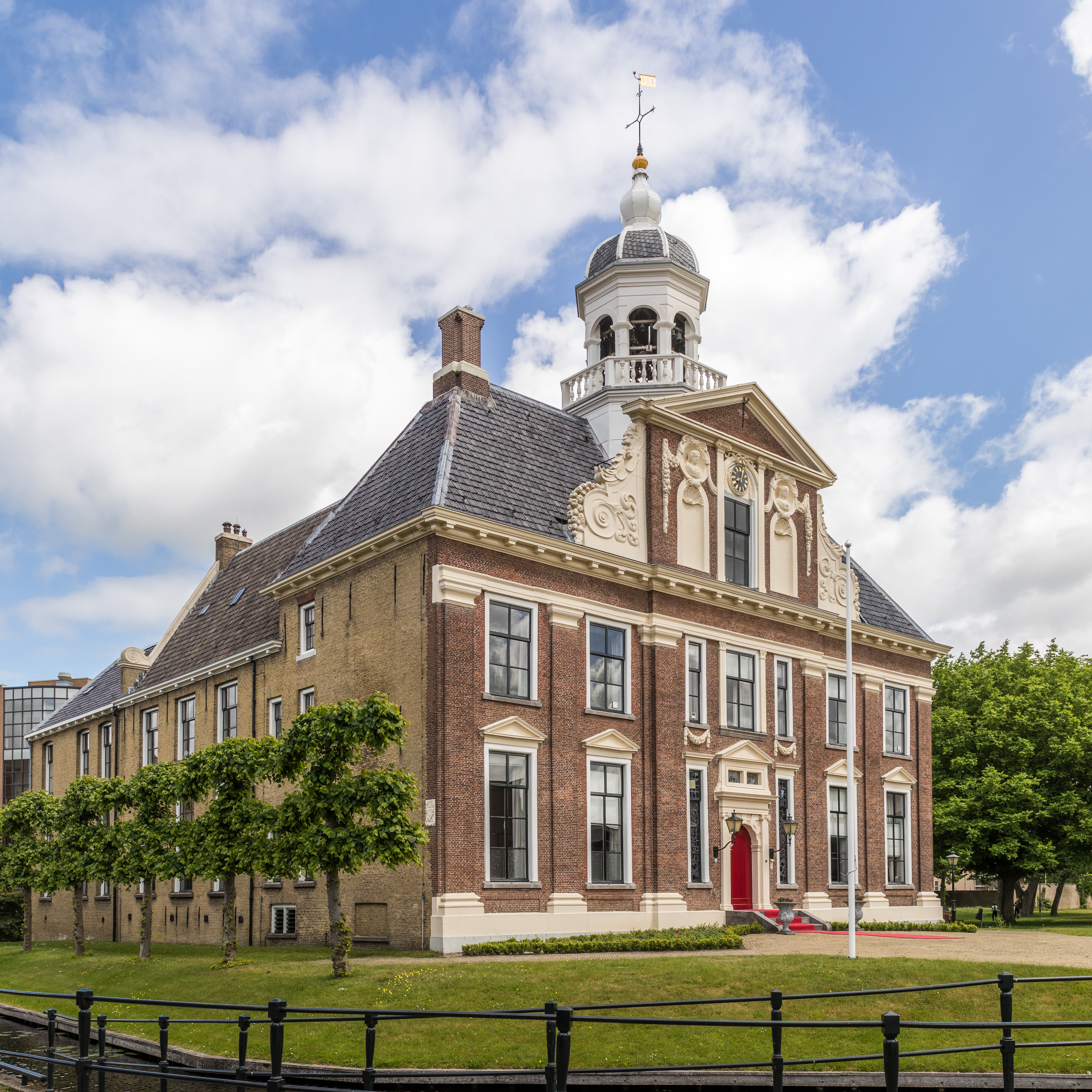
- Crackstate

General information
- Status: Wedding chapel, municipal office
- Type: Stins
- Address: Crackstraat 2, 8441 ES
- Town or city: Heerenveen, Friesland
- Country: Netherlands
- Coordinates: 52°57′40″N 5°55′19″E
- Named for: Johannes Sytzes Crack
- Year(s) built: 1647–1648

Design and construction
- Architect(s): Willem de Keyser
- Designations: Rijksmonument (nr. 21169)

The Crackstate is a monumental stins in the Dutch town of Heerenveen, Friesland. It was built in 1648 by order of Johannes Sytzes Crack, the namesake of the estate. It is currently property of the municipality of Heerenveen and functions as wedding chapel.

== Description ==
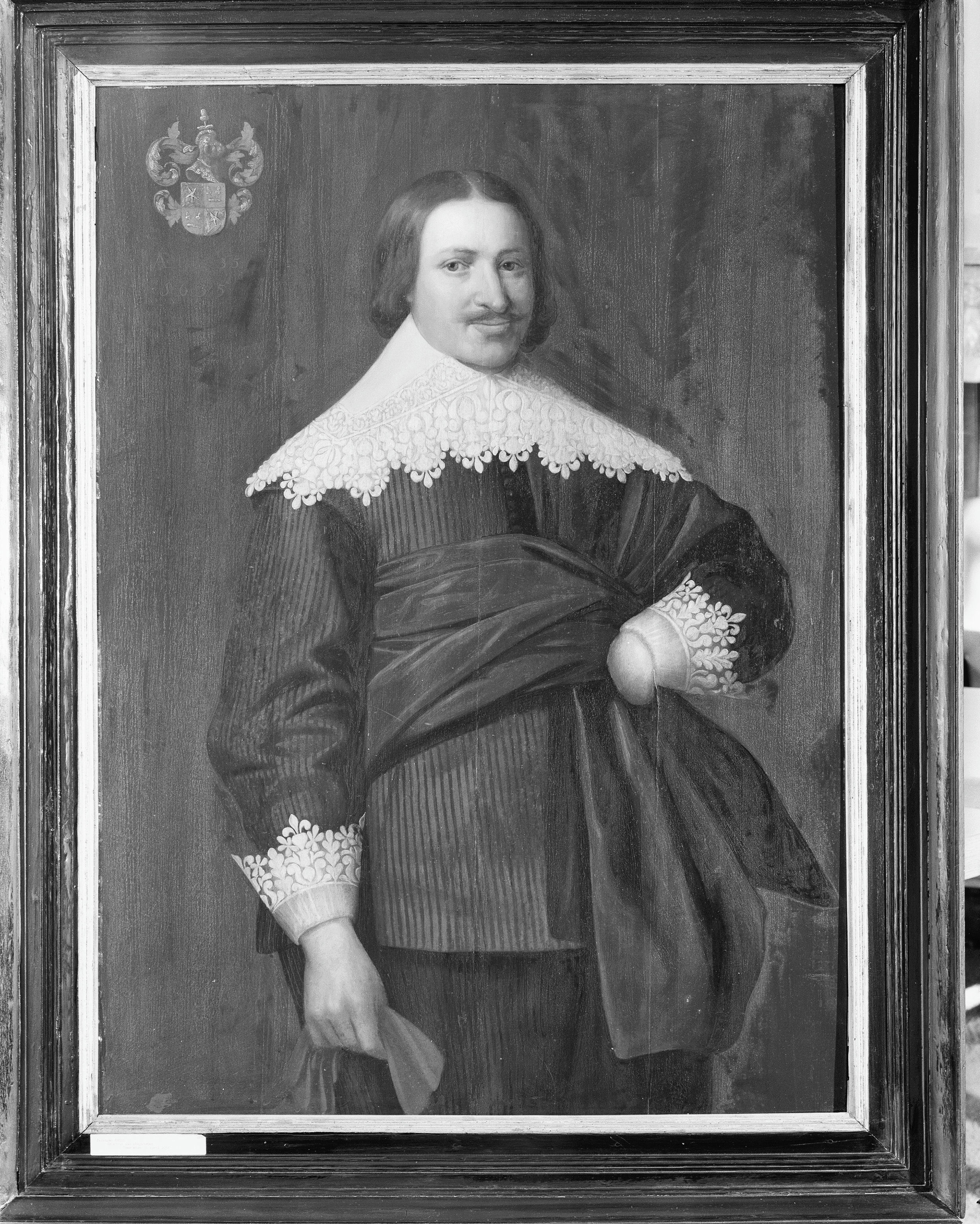
Johannes Sytzes Crack (1652)

The Crackstate was built in 1648 by order of Johannes Sytzes Crack, grietman of Aengwirden, on the site where a stins stood dating from 1599. The design was probably by Willem de Keyser, son of the famous Hendrick de Keyser. The building therefore has a somewhat Amsterdam feel. It is surrounded by a moat. The bridge over the moat dates from 1775, as stated on a foundation stone. The gate for the bridge comes from the area around Hoorn, mentioning the year 1819. Until 1833, the stins served as a residence of the Crack family. After that, the building became the property of the Dutch state.

In 1890, a prison was added. For more than a century, the building served as a courthouse and as a Huis van Arrest (prison). During the Second World War, torture and executions took place in this prison by members of the Nazi German Sicherheitsdienst (SD). The prison was demolished in 1973 and a monument was erected in 1995 to commemorate the prisoners.

In 1949, the Crackstate became the property of the municipality. Since 1952, the building has served as the town hall of Heerenveen. In 1993, a new town hall was built next to the state. The two buildings are connected. The wedding chapel and offices of the mayor and aldermen are in the monumental building.

The Crackstate has a tower with a dome, which was probably used as a lookout post. In 1962, a carillon with 37 bells was placed in it, which was overhauled in 1985 and expanded with two bells.

The stins was designated rijksmonument status on 13 February 1967.

== Gallery ==
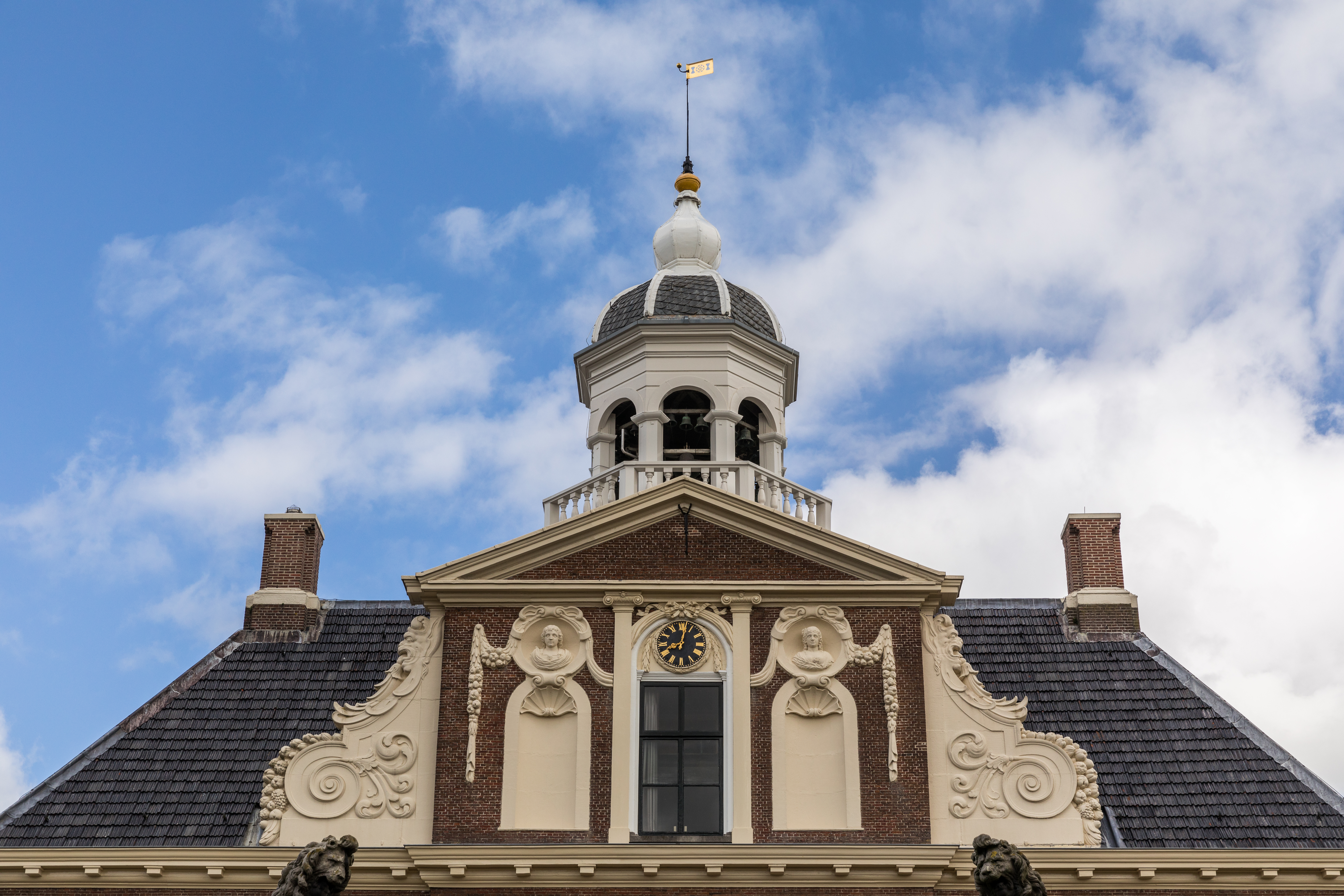
Detail of the carillon

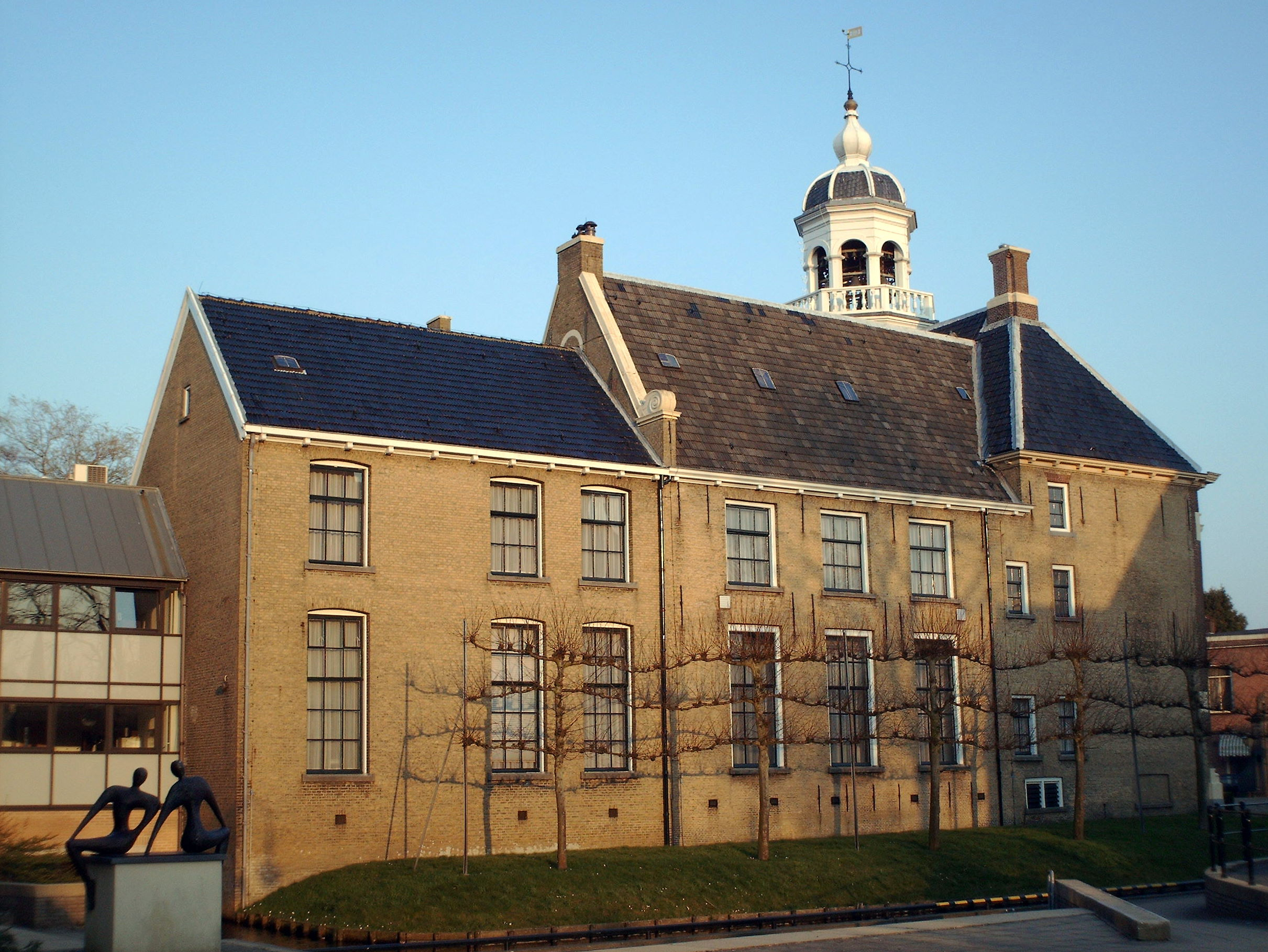
West side

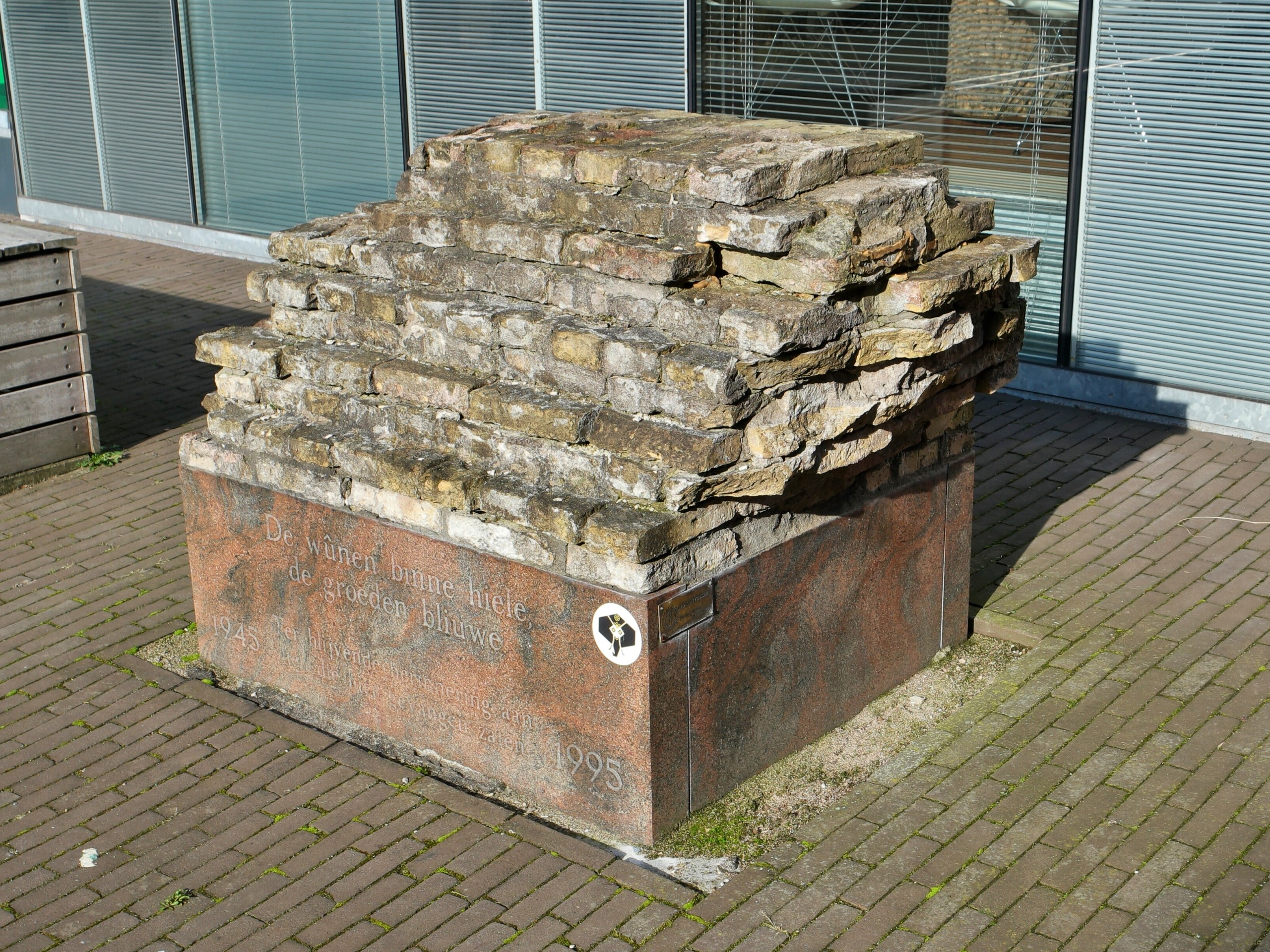
Monument

== See also ==
- List of stins in Friesland
