= Kiser =

Kiser is a variation spelling of the Germanic Kaiser surname, and is pronounced in the same manner as Kaiser. This spelling originated before Standard German was codified, in territory that today falls within the mountainous Black Forest area of Germany and neighboring areas of Switzerland. The Kiser spelling is also common among current descendants living in the forested Appalachian mountains of North America.

Notable people with the surname include:

- André Kiser (born 1958), Swiss Olympic bobsledder
- Curt Kiser (born 1944), American politician from Florida
- Earl Kiser (fl. 1900), bicycle racer
- Emily Kiser (born 2000), basketball player
- Garland Kiser (born 1968), baseball player
- Holly Kiser (born 1986), fashion model
- Jack Kiser (born 2000), American football linebacker
- Jack Kiser (American football coach) (born 1949)
- Jackson L. Kiser (1929–2020), American judge
- Joseph L. Kiser (born 1933), right-wing politician from Western North Carolina
- John William Kiser (1857–1916), American businessman
- Micah Kiser (born 1995), American professional football player
- Nate Kiser (born 1982), ice hockey player
- Sherman L. Kiser (1889–1974), military officer
- Terry Kiser (born 1939), actor, best known for playing the role of "Bernie" in the film Weekend at Bernie's

== See also ==
- Kiser Lake (Ohio), reservoir in the United States
- Meyer–Kiser Building, Miami, Florida
