= Keijzer =

Keijzer is a Dutch surname meaning "emperor" (modern Dutch keizer). The name contains a ij digraph that is often replaced with a "y", especially outside the Netherlands. Among variant forms of the surname are Keijser, Keijsers, Keijzers, Keizer, Keyser, De Keijzer, De Keyser, and De Keyzer. People with this name include:

== Keijzer ==
- Annemarie Keijzer (born 1958), Dutch equestrian
- Gerd de Keijzer (born 1992), Dutch racing cyclist
- Ingrid Keijzer (born 1964), Dutch cricketer
- Mona Keijzer (born 1968), Dutch politician
- Pieter Keijzer (born 1949), Dutch competitive sailor

== Keijser ==
- Harry de Keijser (1900–1995), Dutch pole vaulter and decathlete
- Marieke Keijser (born 1997), Dutch rower
- Roland Keijser (1944–2019), Swedish jazz musician

== Keyzer ==
- Mike Keyzer (1911–1983), Dutch VVD politician and diplomat

== De Keyzer ==
- Bruno de Keyzer (1949–2019), French cinematographer
- Carl De Keyzer (born 1958), Belgian photographer
- Jack de Keyzer (born 1955), British-born Canadian blues musician
- Peter De Keyzer (born 1975), Belgian economist
