= Joseph Kaiser =

Joseph Kaiser may refer to:

- Joseph Franz Kaiser (1786–1859), Austrian lithographer and publisher
- Joseph Kaiser (born 1977), Canadian operatic tenor

== See also ==
- Kaiser (surname)
