= Alexei de Keyser =

British television producer

- Born: Alexei Paul de Keyser; 21 September 1967; London, England
- Died: 28 July 2004 (aged 36); London, England
- Occupation: Television producer
- Father: David de Keyser

Alexei Paul de Keyser (21 September 1967 – 28 July 2004) was a British television producer, a son of the British actor David de Keyser.

== Early life ==
De Keyser was born in London to David de Keyser and Fay Brooke. He was educated at St Christopher's School, a progressive boarding school in Letchworth, Hertfordshire, and William Ellis School in Highgate, London. He then studied drama at Hull University, leaving early to work as a barman at the Groucho Club in London.

== Career ==
His first role was reading scripts for the independent producer Verity Lambert, and he became her script editor at Cinema Verity, working on shows such as the ITV comedy Class Act. In 1996 he moved to Carlton Television, where he transformed the drama London Bridge into a twice-weekly soap.

De Keyser joined the BBC in 1997 as series script editor for BBC One's popular long-running drama Casualty. He quickly rose to become producer and then, in 1999, series producer. In 2000 he was made Executive Producer for BBC Drama Series, where he launched the first series of Waking the Dead, which gained an International Emmy nomination in the Best Drama Series category in 2003. In the week of his death the series drew more than eight million viewers, its highest audience to that point. He also executive produced two series of the BBC Three comedy Grease Monkeys.

== Personal life ==
He died unexpectedly at his London home on 28 July 2004, aged 36.
