= George R. Kayser House =

Historic house in Arizona, United States

- U.S. National Register of Historic Places
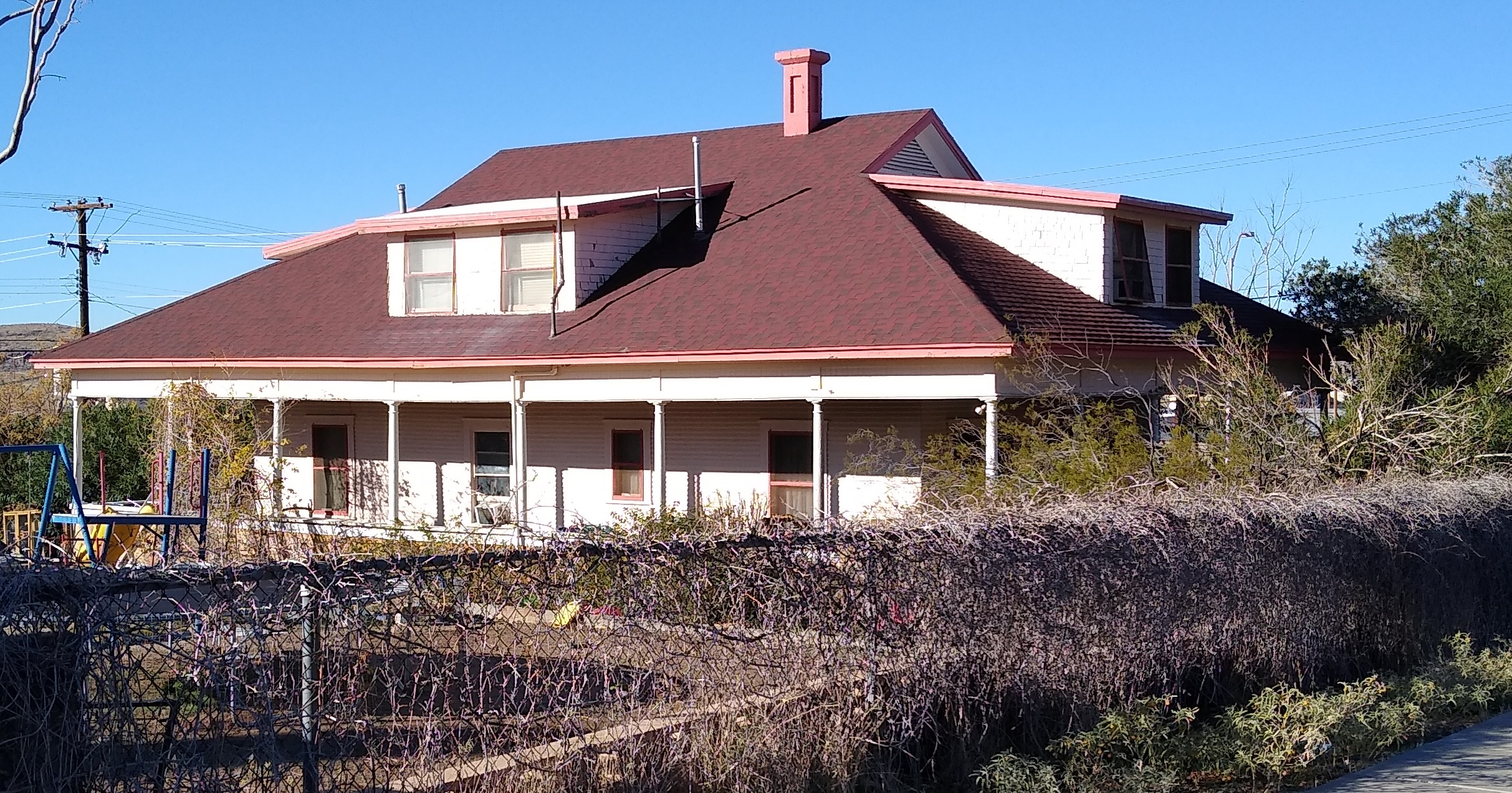

- Location within Arizona Location within the United States
- Location: 604 E. Oak Street; Kingman, Arizona
- Coordinates: 35°11′23″N 114°2′53″W
- Built: 1911
- Architectural style: Colonial Revival
- MPS: Kingman MRA
- NRHP reference No.: 86001151
- Added to NRHP: May 14, 1986

The George R. Kayser House is in Kingman, Arizona. The house was built in 1911 in the Colonial Revival style. The house is on an important corner located in the residential area development of 1910 to 20. There was a housing boom in Kingman. The house is on the National Register of Historic Places.

It was evaluated for National Register listing as part of a 1985 study of 63 historic resources in Kingman that led to this and many others being listed.
