= Ethel de Keyser =

South African anti-apartheid activist

Ethel de Keyser OBE
- Born: Ethel Tarshish; 4 November 1926
- Died: 16 July 2004 (aged 77); London, UK
- Occupation: Anti-apartheid activist
- Spouse: David de Keyser (m. 1949–1959, dissolved)

Ethel de Keyser OBE OLG (4 November 1926 - 16 July 2004) was a South African anti-apartheid activist based in London, England.

== Early life ==
Ethel Tarshish was born in 1926, to Jewish parents who moved to South Africa soon after she was born. (Some obituaries located her birth in Vilnius, some in South Africa.) Her father owned a garment factory in South Africa. She went to college in England and became a British citizen. She returned to South Africa in 1960 after the Sharpeville massacre and the detention of her brother Jack Tarshish.

== Career ==
She became involved with her anti-apartheid work. She was on her way back to England in 1963 when Jack was arrested again as a member of the African National Congress. She was in South Africa for the trial but was deported afterwards, and Jack was jailed for twelve years. Back in England, she worked for the London Symphony Orchestra while volunteering for the Anti-Apartheid Movement (AAM), eventually becoming its executive secretary. She led campaigns to maintain the British arms embargo against South Africa, and to refuse recognition to the Ian Smith regime in Rhodesia. She helped organize SATIS (South Africa The Imprisoned Society), a conference and network for those working for the release of political prisoners.

She became director of the British Defence and Aid Fund for Southern Africa (BDAF) in 1981, and set up an educational trust (the Canon Collins Educational Trust for Southern Africa) as well. Antony Sher said she was his "political guru" during this time.

After 1994, her work shifted from an anti-apartheid focus to health and education causes in South Africa, including HIV/AIDS. She was awarded an OBE for her human rights work in 2001.

== Personal life ==
Ethel Tarshish was married to actor David de Keyser for ten years (from 1949 to 1959), and she had a longterm relationship with writer George Lamming.

Ethel de Keyser died aged 77 on 16 July 2004, after a heart attack. She had been looking forward to being awarded an honorary degree at the University of the Western Cape in September. The trustees of the Canon Collins Educational Trust established scholarships in her name as a memorial.
