= Ralph Kayser =

German medical specialist

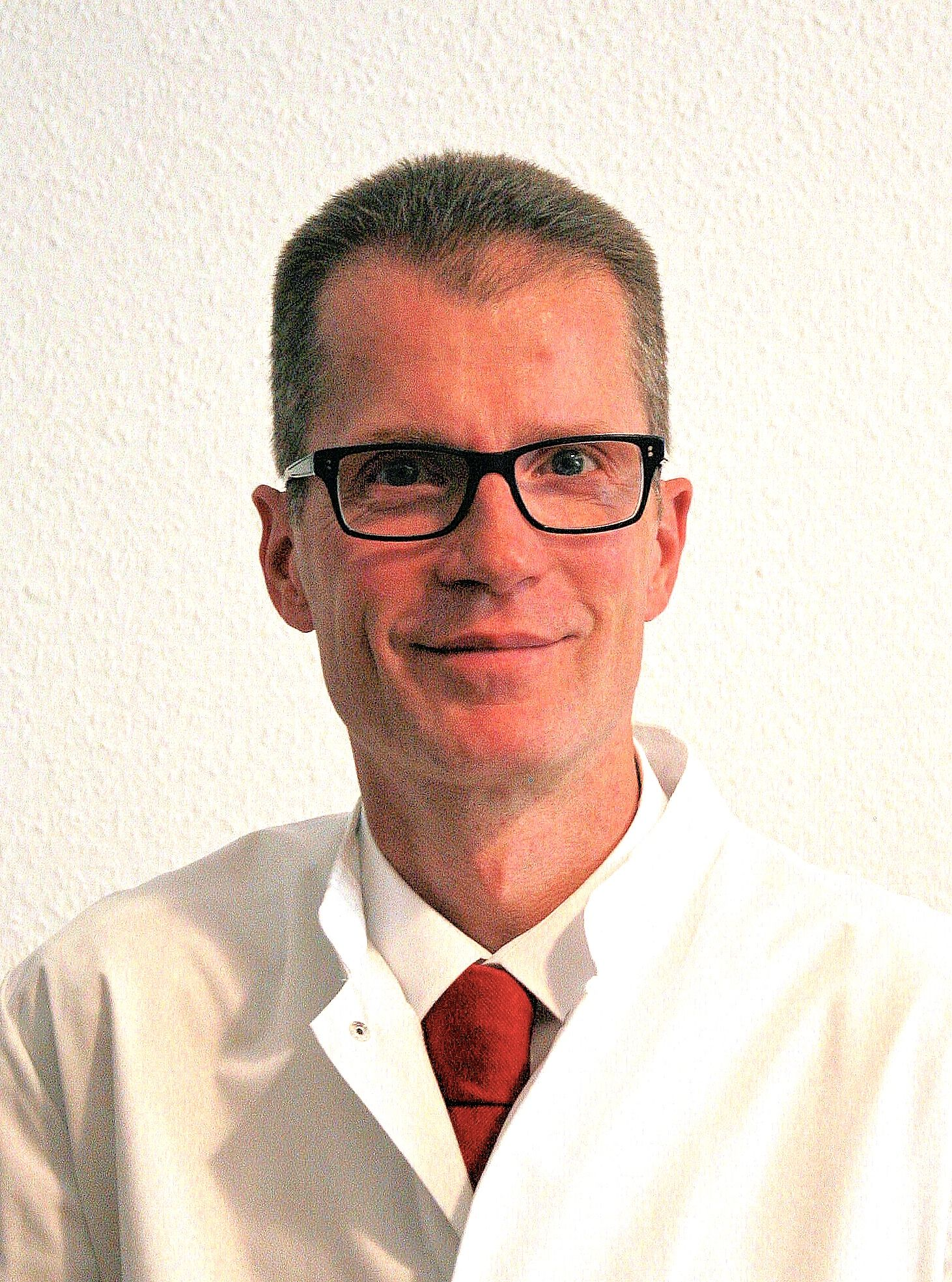
- Known for: experimental ultrasound diagnostic and the special spinal surgery
- Scientific career
- Fields: medical specialist in orthopedics and trauma surgery
- Workplaces: Greifswald Medical School

Ralph Kayser is a medical specialist in orthopedics and trauma surgery with a particular focus on spinal orthopedics. Furthermore, he is an associate professor at the medical department of the Greifswald Medical School. His particular scientific interest lies in the experimental ultrasound diagnostic and the special spinal surgery, especially in the conservative and minimal-invasive spinal indications.

== Biography ==
From 1987 to 1994 Kayser studied human medicine at the medical department of the Humboldt University of Berlin. From 1994 until 2000 he had been working as an assistant physician at the orthopedic clinic in Magdeburg and the central clinic Bad Berka. In 2000 he became a medical specialist for orthopedics. Subsequently, Kayser carried out several activities at the clinic and polyclinic for orthopedics at the University of Leipzig (2001-2002) and the clinic in Dessau (2002-2004) among other things as senior physician. Between 2004 and 2007 he completed a further training at the Charité – University Medicine Berlin to become a medical specialist in orthopedics and trauma surgery. In 2006, Kayser finished his habilitation which addressed the issue of experimental investigations regarding the instability of the lumbar spine and contained the development of an intraoperative device to three-dimensionally record force-displacement curves in human lumbar motor segments. In the same year he became senior physician at the center for special surgery of the locomotive system at the clinic for orthopedics and trauma surgery of the Charité. After that he became deputy director of the clinic for orthopedics and orthopedic surgery at the Greifswald Medical School where he stayed from 2008 until 2012. In 2011 Kayser received the first place of the W2-professorship for orthopedics with particular focus on spinal surgery at the Greifswald Medical School. In 2013, he was appointed professor and in the position of the director he managed the clinic for orthopedics, Vivantes Klinikum in Friedrichshain, Berlin until 2014. Currently, Kayser is managing the division spinal surgery and special orthopedic pain therapy at the clinic for orthopedic-, trauma- and reconstructive surgery at the Charité.

== Scientific contribution ==
In his initial scientific activities, Kayser had focused on pediatric orthopedics and ultrasound examination of the locomotor system. During his activities at the universities of Magdeburg, Leipzig and Berlin (Charité) Kayser contributed several important scientific works in this field. From 2000 on Kayser has addressed himself to his current medical specialities spinal surgery and minimal-invasive spinal therapy as well as the nonoperative spinal treatment – injection treatment and Manual Medicine/Chirotherapie. He has developed diagnostic and therapeutic concepts to treat degenerative spinal column diseases in a conservative and operational way. Besides, he had been working in the scientific field which deals with the connection of structural and functional pathologies of the supporting and movement system. Of particular importance for Kayser in this field is an holistic assessment of the patients by means of a development of conservative and operative single-source therapy options. Another focal point is the minimal-invasive spinal therapy, whereby the establishment of a combined treatment with intraoperative radiotherapy and cement augmentation at the University of Greifswald as one of the two centers in Germany has to be emphasized.

== Memberships in scientific organisations ==
Kayser is a member of the German Society of Orthopaedics and Orthopaedic Surgery and the professional association of physicians for Orthopaedics and Trauma Surgery, the German Spinal Column Society and the Doctors Association for Manual Medicine. Furthermore, he is a member of the National Disease Management "back-pain" as well as the working group "Skeletal and Kinetic Organs" of the German Society for Ultrasound in Medicine (DEGUM). Besides, Kayser is deputy head of the commission "Conservative Spinal Treatment" of the German Spinal Column Society.

== Publications ==
- PubMed list of publications
