= John William Kiser =

19th century industrialist

John W. Kiser
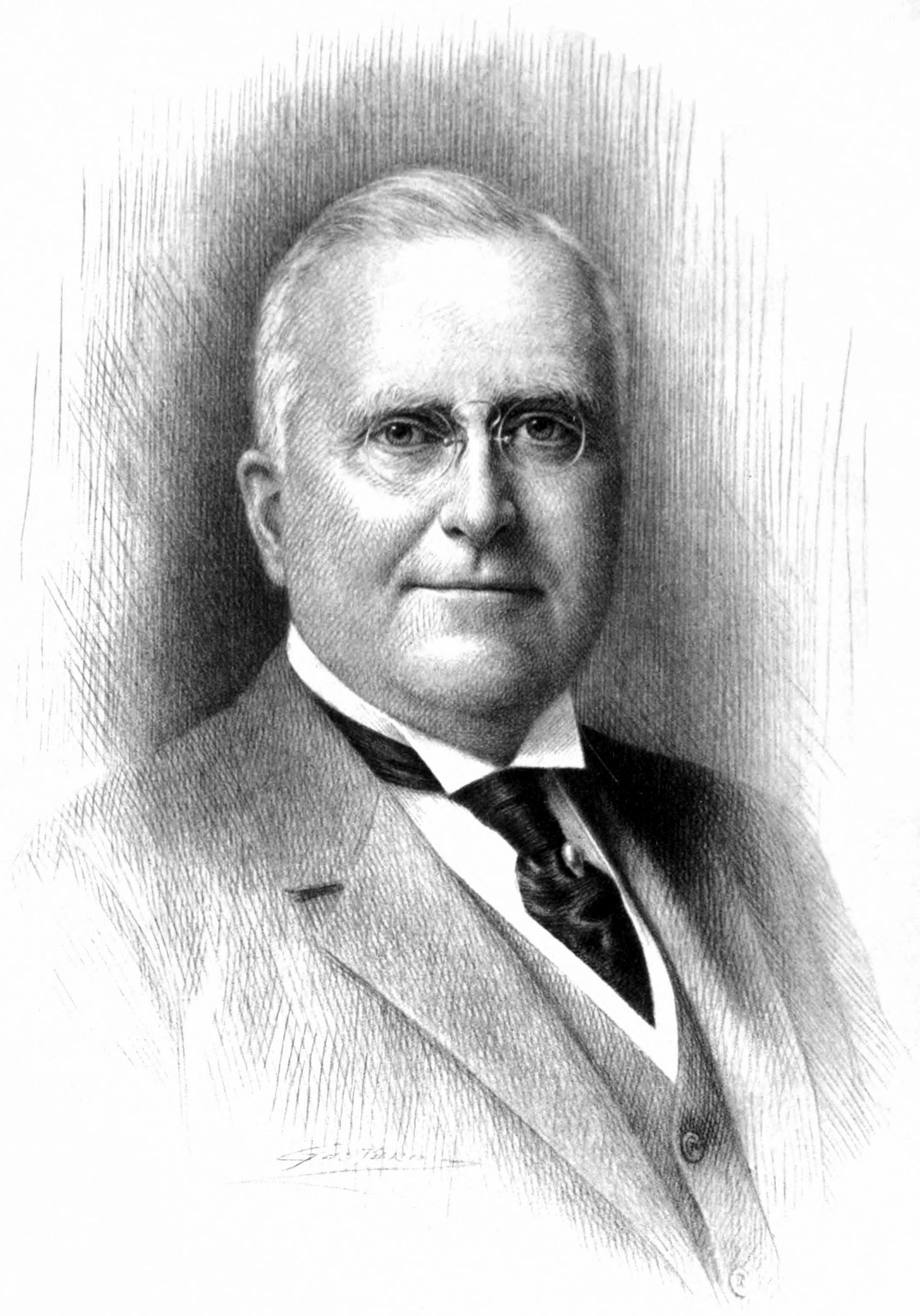
- Born: John William Kiser; June 20, 1857; St. Paris, Ohio, US
- Died: October 31, 1916 (aged 59); Chicago, US
- Resting place: Spring Grove Cemetery Saint Paris, Champaign County, Ohio
- Education: Wittenburg College
- Occupation: Industrialist
- Known for: Bicycle manufacturer
- Notable work: Monarch Cycle Manufacturing Company
- Spouse: Thyrza (nee) Furrow
- Children: 1

Signature
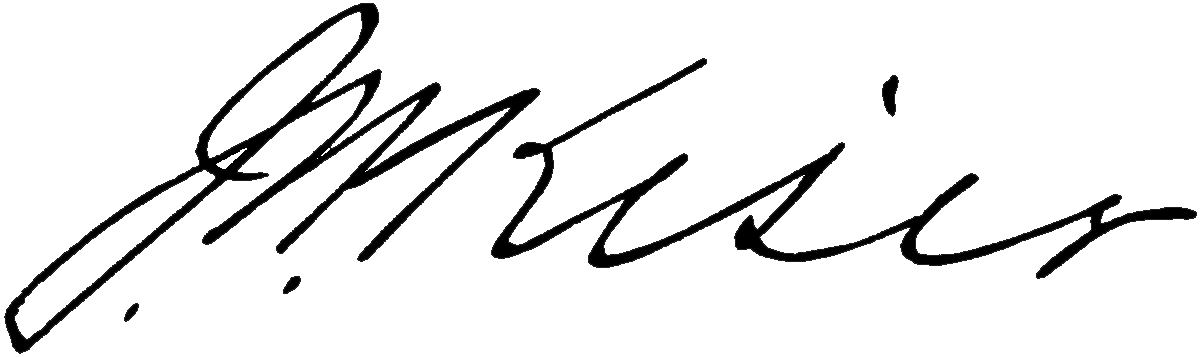

John William Kiser (June 20, 1857 – October 31, 1916) was a 19th-century industrialist who owned the Monarch Cycle Manufacturing Company in Chicago, Illinois. His company became one of the largest bicycle manufacturers in the world.

== Early life ==
Kiser was born in St. Paris, Ohio, June 20, 1857. His parents were farmers George R. Kiser and Margaret Ellen (née McVey) Kiser. In 1884 he graduated with a Bachelor of Arts degree from Wittenburg College.

== Career ==
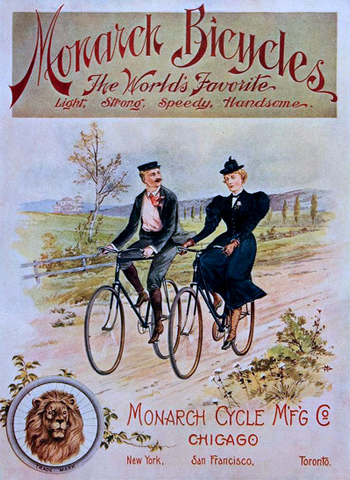
Monarch Cycle ad depicting bike riders 1896

In 1889 when Kiser moved to Chicago, he had few resources, with his obituary in the American Artisan and Hardware Record later describing him as "practically penniless". That same year he took a job as manager of the Chicago Sewing Machine company. He rose to become the president of the company. Taking advantage of a boom in bicycle usage in the United States at that time, he and his partner Chandler Robbins then started Monarch Cycle Manufacturing Company to manufacture bicycles. The company, which was established with $500,000 in capital, built its factory at the corner of North Halsted and West Lake Streets in Chicago. The building was designed by John Mills II.

In 1892, Monarch Cycle had only 35 employees and made 150 bicycles. By 1896 the company had 1200 employees, and they were producing 50,000 bicycles. At its peak, the Monarch Cycle employed around 400 engineers. The company sold bicycles worldwide.

In 1899 he sold his company to the Bicycle Trustjust before the sales crashed due to the emergence of automobile.

In 1902 he became the treasurer of the Phoenix Horseshoe Company of Chicago. By 1907 he was made president of the company. He was also the director of the First National Bank and the Miehle Printing Press.

== Personal life ==
He married Thirza (in some places spelled Thyrza) Wilhelmina (née) Furrow on September 18, 1884. They had one son born June 10, 1889; he was also named John William Kiser. It was reported that Kiser had amassed a fortune of $8 million (approximately US$200 million, adjusted for inflation as of December 2021) by the time of his death. Kiser had an interest in sailing and, in 1923, commissioned a 157-foot steel motor yacht from Friedrich Krupp Germaniawerft. The 375-ton vessel was purchased by the Maritime Commission and was used in the navy during World War II.

== Death ==
Kiser spent his time in St. Paris, Ohio, and New York and Chicago. He died October 31, 1916, in Chicago Illinois, at the Blackstone Hotel and his body was sent back to St. Paris for burial.
