= Keizer =

Keizer may refer to:

- Keizer (surname)
- Keizer (artist), a street artist in Cairo, Egypt
- Keizer, Oregon
- The Dutch word for an emperor or caesar
- Salem-Keizer Volcanoes, minor league baseball team from Keizer, Oregon

== See also ==
- Keyser (disambiguation)
- Kaiser
