= David de Keyser =

British actor (1927–2021)

- Born: 22 August 1927; London, England
- Died: 20 February 2021 (aged 93)
- Occupations: Actor; narrator
- Spouse: Ethel de Keyser
- Children: Alexei de Keyser

David de Keyser (22 August 1927 – 20 February 2021) was an English actor and narrator.

== Life and career ==
Born in London in August 1927, in the mid-1960s de Keyser worked twice with the writer, actor and director Jane Arden. Their first collaboration, The Logic Game (January 1965), was directed by Philip Saville. They acted together again in another Jane Arden script in the film Separation (Jack Bond 1968) which was set in London and featured music by Procol Harum, Matthew Fisher and Stanley Myers. The themes of both pieces were marital strife and disintegrating relationships.

De Keyser also worked on four occasions for the British director John Boorman, twice on screen in Catch Us If You Can (1965) and Leo the Last (1970), and on two further occasions Boorman used de Keyser's rich voice, firstly as the Voice of the Tabernacle in Zardoz (1974), and as the Voice of the Grail in Excalibur (1981). Other unseen roles were the voice of Count Mitterhaus' curse in Vampire Circus (uncredited) and the dubbing of Dracula in The Legend of the 7 Golden Vampires.

He starred in the BBC Radio 4 comedy The Attractive Young Rabbi with Tracy-Ann Oberman. He also made an appearance in the British TV series The Professionals, in the episode entitled "Servant of Two Masters". Other television appearances included the Thriller episode "Someone at the Top of the Stairs", in which he played the eponymous Cartney, Yes Prime Minister in the episode "A Victory for Democracy" where he played the Israeli Ambassador and the Robin of Sherwood episode "The Children of Israel" as Joshua de Talmont. He guest starred in UK Television series Dick Turpin starring Richard O'Sullivan in part two of an episode entitled "Sentence of Death" where he played the character The Duke of Hesse.

De Keyser was the narrator for British Pathé Pictorial in the 1960s, and also did voiceover work on television advertisements in the United Kingdom, as well as served as the announcer on the first series of comedy panel game Would I Lie to You?, before being replaced for the second series. His voice can also be heard on the trailer (included in DVD releases) for The Dark Crystal. He was married to anti-apartheid activist Ethel de Keyser from 1949 to 1959. He is the father of Alexei de Keyser (1967–2004).

He died in February 2021, aged 93.

== Partial filmography ==
- 1957: The Secret Place – Ticket Clerk (uncredited)
- 1964: Castle of the Living Dead – Eric (voice, uncredited)
- 1965: The Logic Game (TV) – The Man
- 1965: Catch Us If You Can – Zissell
- 1966: Our Man in Marrakesh – Hotel Clerk and Motorcycle Policeman (uncredited)
- 1968: Separation – Husband
- 1968: The Vengeance of She – Killikrates (voice, uncredited)
- 1969: The Blood of Fu Manchu – of The Governor and others (voice)
- 1969: The Castle of Fu Manchu – Omar Pasha and others (voice, uncredited)
- 1969: On Her Majesty's Secret Service – Marc Ange Draco (voice, uncredited)
- 1970: Leo the Last – David
- 1970: You Can't Win 'Em All – Gunner Major (voice, uncredited)
- 1971: Irresistible – Swiss Tourist
- 1971: The Chairman's Wife – Superintendent
- 1971: The Horsemen – Mukhi (uncredited)
- 1971: Diamonds Are Forever – Doctor
- 1972: Vampire Circus – Mitterhaus's Curse (voice, uncredited)
- 1973: Bequest to the Nation – French Commander (uncredited)
- 1973: A Touch of Class – Doctor Alvarez
- 1974: Zardoz – Tabernacle (voice, uncredited)
- 1974: The Legend of the 7 Golden Vampires – Dracula (voice, uncredited)
- 1974: Murder on the Orient Express – Turkish Ticket Collector (voice, uncredited)
- 1975: Brannigan – Drexel and Jennifer's Boyfriend (uncredited)
- 1975: Paper Tiger – Ambassador Kagoyama (voice)
- 1975: The Hiding Place – Eusie Koonstra
- 1975: The Romantic Englishwoman – George
- 1976: The Message – minor roles (uncredited)
- 1976: Voyage of the Damned – Joseph Joseph
- 1977: Valentino – Joseph Schenck
- 1977: Holocaust 2000 – Dubbing (voice, uncredited)
- 1978: Revenge of the Pink Panther – TV Newscaster (voice, uncredited)
- 1978: Superman – Warden (voice, uncredited)
- 1980: Flash Gordon – Colonel of Battle Control Room (voice, uncredited)
- 1981: Balham, Gateway to the South – Narrator (voice)
- 1981: Excalibur (voice only)
- 1982: A Woman Called Golda – David Ben-Gurion
- 1983: The Ploughman's Lunch – Gold
- 1983: Yentl – Rabbi Zalman
- 1984: Lassiter – Gunz (voice)
- 1985: King David – Ahitophel
- 1986: Yes, Prime Minister – Israeli Ambassador
- 1988: Out of the Shadows – James Bluminfeld
- 1989: A Dry White Season – Susan's Father
- 1989: Confessional (TV) – Professor Cherny
- 1989: Red King, White Knight – Director
- 1991-92: The House of Eliott – Sir Desmond Gillispie
- 1992: Leon the Pig Farmer – Sidney Geller
- 1993: Poirot – Gaston Beaujeu (The chocolate box)
- 1995-97: Goodnight Sweetheart (TV series) – Dr. Jakowitz
- 1997: The Designated Mourner – Howard
- 1998: Simon Magus – Rabbi
- 1999: Sunshine – Emmanuel Sonnenschein
- 2000: The Nine Lives of Tomas Katz – Exhumed rabbi
- 2002: The Poet – Lomax
- 2002: Waking the Dead – Marcus Freeman in Death Watch (2 episodes)
- 2003: The Statement – Dom André
- 2008: God on Trial – Hugo
- 2008: Good – Mandelstam
- 2010: Doctor Who (Voice only) – Atraxi
- 2010: Gin & Dry (Short Film) – Albie
- 2014: Closer to the Moon – Moritz
