= Bert Keizer =

Dutch writer and geriatrician (born 1947)

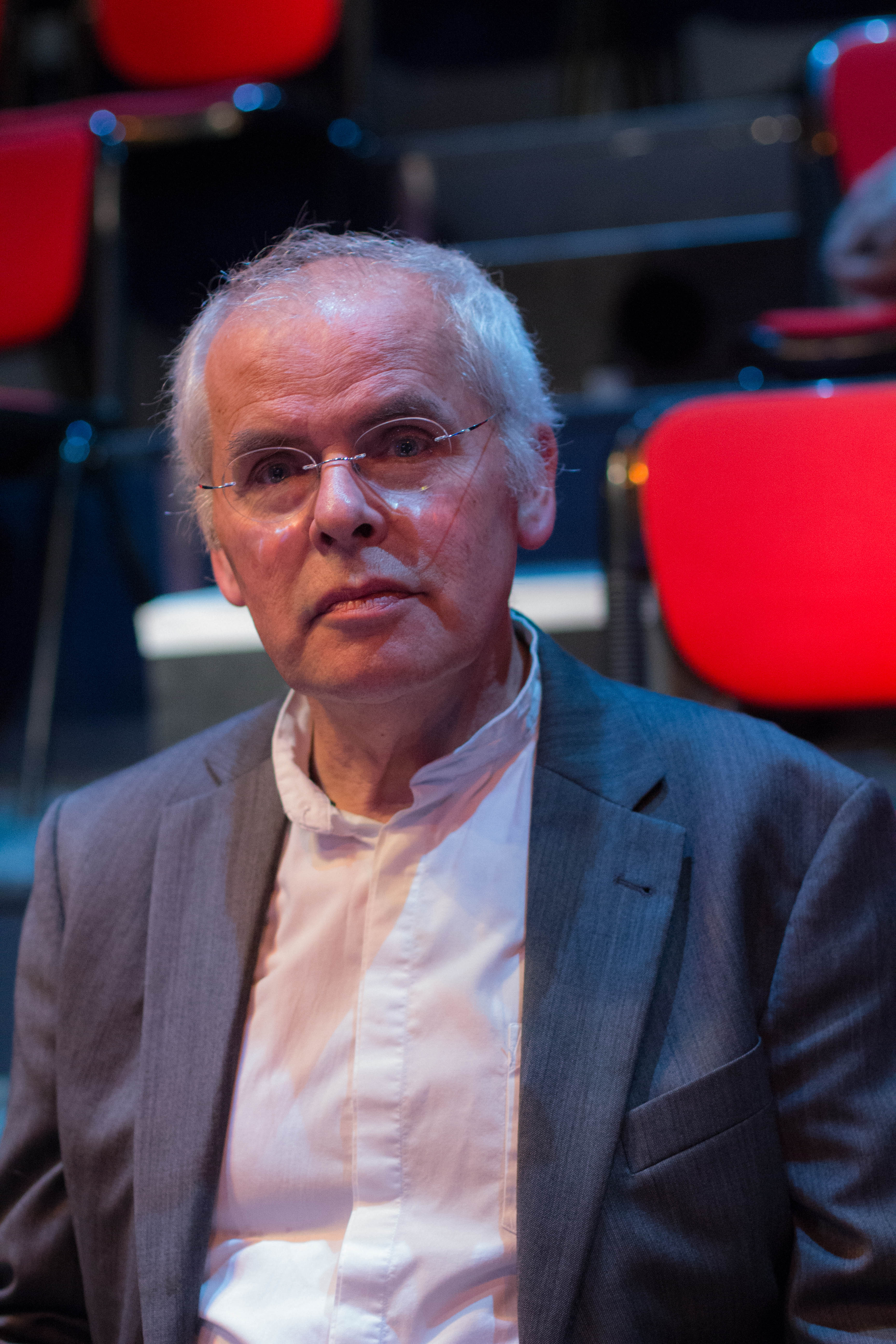
Bert Keizer, 2014

Bert Keizer (born 1947 in Amersfoort) is a Dutch writer and geriatrician.

He lived in England from 1968 to 1972 and studied philosophy at the University of Nottingham, then medicine at the University of Amsterdam. He qualified as a doctor in 1981 and then worked shortly in Kenya. Since 1985 he has been a geriatrician in Amsterdam.

== Writing ==
As a physician in a nursing home he has written about physician assisted suicide (which has been legal in the Netherlands for some years), most notably in his book Het refrein is Hein, which was translated into English (by Keizer himself) as Dancing with Mr D and published by Transworld-Doubleday in 1994. The book was also translated into German, Spanish, Japanese, Danish, Swedish, Russian, Korean and French.

His style is contemplative, with an undercurrent of realism (or some would say pessimism) about the limits of medicine which most people prefer not to think about, and a remarkable intellectual honesty about the emotions of the patient as well as the physician.

While the topic of euthanasia and assisted suicide was the most salient point for the literary criticism, it is not a very large part of the book.
