= Carole Dekeijser =

Belgian painter

Carole Dekeijser (1959–2008) was a Belgian painter, mainly known for her monumental figurative paintings, for example: Hypnos and Thanathos, Yin-Yang the Global Change or the Sacring of Jeanne d'Arc. She was also the creator of many abstract paintings.

She started her professional career as a scientific designer in the department of medical research run by Prof. Haumont at the UCL (Louvain University, Belgium). In 1990, Carole Dekeijser worked in the biology department of the ULB (Brussels University) where she illustrated several scientific books for, among others, the neuro-psychiatric department of the Brussels Military Hospital and the pharmaceutical company Park-Davis. To remain closer to her family circle, she joined TTT-Styling-Design, the last of the numerous companies created by her husband, as a commercial artist and scientific designer. During that time, she decorated car bodies, illustrated books for children and gave airbrush classes to professional designers. Along with these activities, Mr. D. Cahen, head of the Institute for Natural Sciences, asked her to illustrate a large exhibition on evolution. Its success exceeded all expectations because of the originality of the approach: human evolution was exclusively presented from a female point of view. Pleased with this successful outcome, the management asked her to take part in all the major events organized by the institute.

On her husband's request, she left the institute in 1999 to devote herself exclusively to painting. Thanks to her training, her career and her friends, she met numerous scientists, philosophers and other people from various fields with whom she shared passions and discoveries. The practice of aikido, aikijutsu, bōjutsu and aikiken, both Japanese martial arts, brought her in touch with the ancient Asian philosophical concepts of the universe.
