= David Kaiser =

David Kaiser may refer to:

- David Kaiser (physicist) (born 1971), American physicist and historian of science at the Massachusetts Institute of Technology
- David E. Kaiser (born 1947), American historian, formerly on the faculty of the Naval War College
- David Kaiser (philanthropist) (1969–2020), American philanthropist and activist, president of the Rockefeller Family Fund
