= Kayser Sung =

Chinese journalist

Kayser Sung is a journalist, littérateur, and recipient of the Ramon Magsaysay Award.

== See also ==
- History of journalism
