= Thomas de Keyser =

Dutch portrait painter (c. 1596 – 1667)

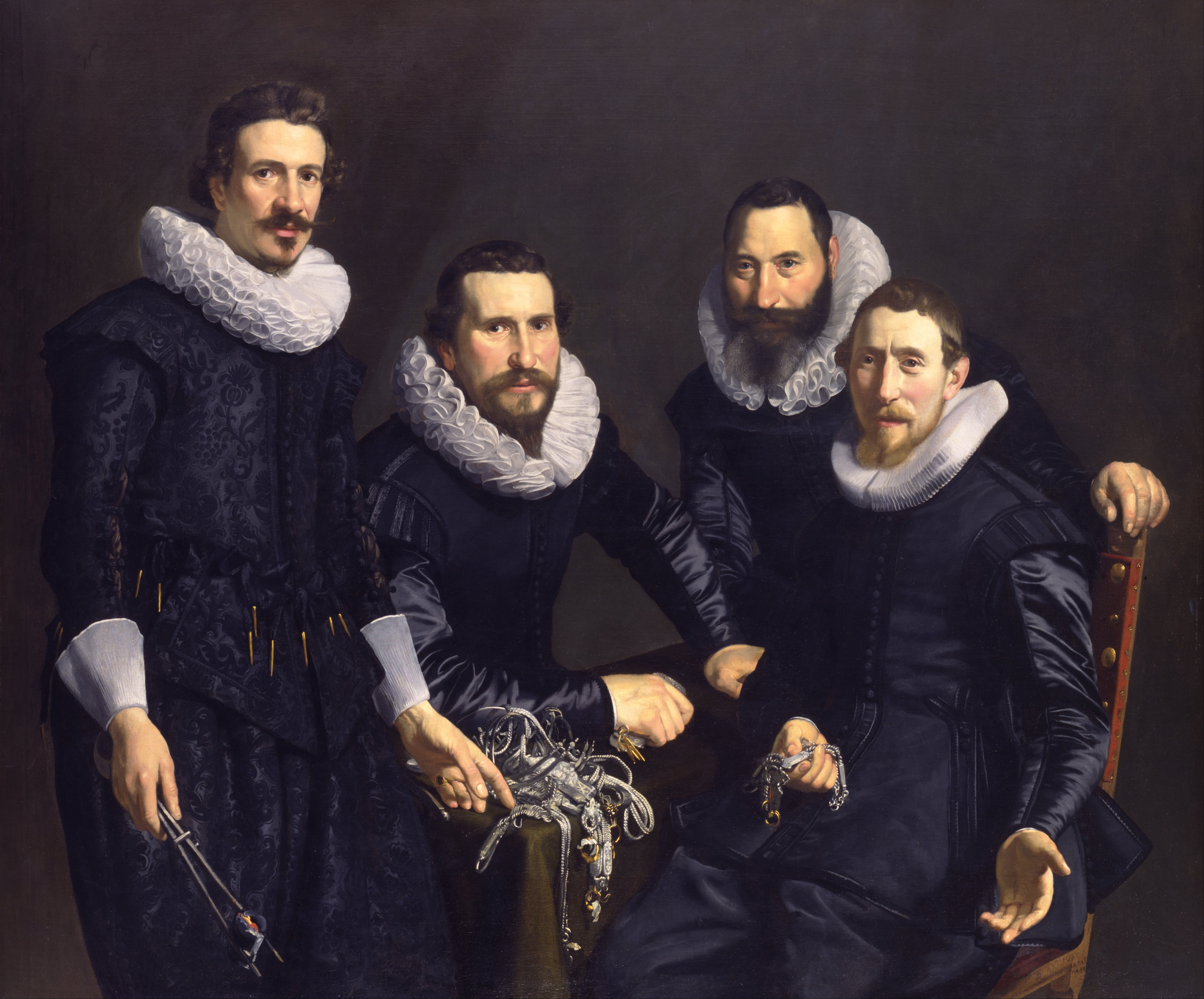
- Thomas de Keyser, Syndics of the Amsterdam Goldsmiths Guild (1627)
- Born: c. 1596
- Died: 1667 (aged 70–71)
- Citizenship: Dutch

Thomas de Keyser (c. 1596 – 1667) was a Dutch portrait painter and a dealer in Belgium bluestone and stone mason. He was the most in-demand portrait painter in the Netherlands until the 1630s, when Rembrandt eclipsed him in popularity. Rembrandt was influenced by his work, and many of de Keyser's paintings were later falsely attributed to Rembrandt.

== Biography ==
Thomas de Keyser was a son of the architect and sculptor Hendrik de Keyser and the brother of Pieter and Willem de Keyser. He and his brothers were raised in a house on the Amsterdam canal Groenburgwal. In 1616 he and Pieter became apprentices of their father; in 1619 he presented his first painting, an Anatomic Lesson, but this attribution was rejected; nowadays Pickenoy is mentioned as creator. It is possible Thomas was influenced by Cornelis Ketel and Pieter Isaacsz, for years friendly to his father. In 1622 Thomas and Pieter became members of the Guild of St. Luke. According to the Netherlands Institute for Art History, he was a pupil of Cornelis van der Voort, the head of the guild, who died in 1624. Van der Voort lived in what is now the Rembrandthuis. The painters Nicolaes Eliaszoon Pickenoy, who lived next door, and Werner van den Valckert have been accredited by different authorities with having developed his talent, and sometimes his works have been confused with these painters, who painted portraits in similar styles. The works of Pieter Lastman and Joachim von Sandrart he knew very well.

In 1622 Thomas and his brother Pieter became member of the Guild. In 1626 the painter lived in Jodenbreestraat when he married Machtelt Andries, the daughter of a goldsmith in Warmoesstraat. As an heir of his uncle Aert the property was sold to the Sefardic community and changed into a house synagogue. Thomas de Keyser faced strong competition from Rembrandt, as a portrait painter and received very few commissions. In 1640 he remarried and lived at Lindengracht in the Jordaan. The couple had five children, baptized as Remonstrants. He owned a Petit Granit business from 1624 until 1654, which he sold to Pieter. Willem, his younger brother, cooperated with the architect Jacob van Campen on sketches for the town hall, but left for England after being accused of fraud and went broke. Thomas occasionally returned to painting: in 1652 a Nausicaa meeting Odyssey on the beach, intended for "Desolate Boedelkamer" in the town hall.

From 1662, at the age of 65, until his death he succeeded Daniel Stalpaert as chief supervisor of the construction, now the Paleis op de Dam. He was buried in the Zuiderkerk, like his father.

== Work ==
The Rijksmuseum in Amsterdam has the largest collection of paintings by de Keyser. His work can also be seen at the Louvre in Paris, the Metropolitan Museum of Art in New York City, the Hermitage in Saint Petersburg and the National Gallery in London, among others.

According to the Encyclopædia Britannica Eleventh Edition, "[h]is portraiture is full of character and masterly in handling, and often distinguished by a rich golden glow of color and Rembrandtesque chiaroscuro. Some of his portraits are life-size, but the artist generally preferred to keep them on a considerably smaller scale, like the famous Four Amsterdam burgomasters assembled to receive Marie de Medici in 1638..." which is now on display at the Mauritshuis museum in The Hague.

The landscape painter Jacob Isaakszoon van Ruisdael painted a landscape as a background to one of his group portraits, burgomaster Cornelis de Graeff and his family and three persons on the back including his brother burgomaster Andries de Graeff in front of their estate near Soestdijk.

== Namesake ==
A contemporary namesake of the painter was T(h)omas de Keyser, Gerritsz. (Utrecht, 1597–1651), his cousin and a stone mason, member of the chamber of rhetoric and actor.

== Gallery ==
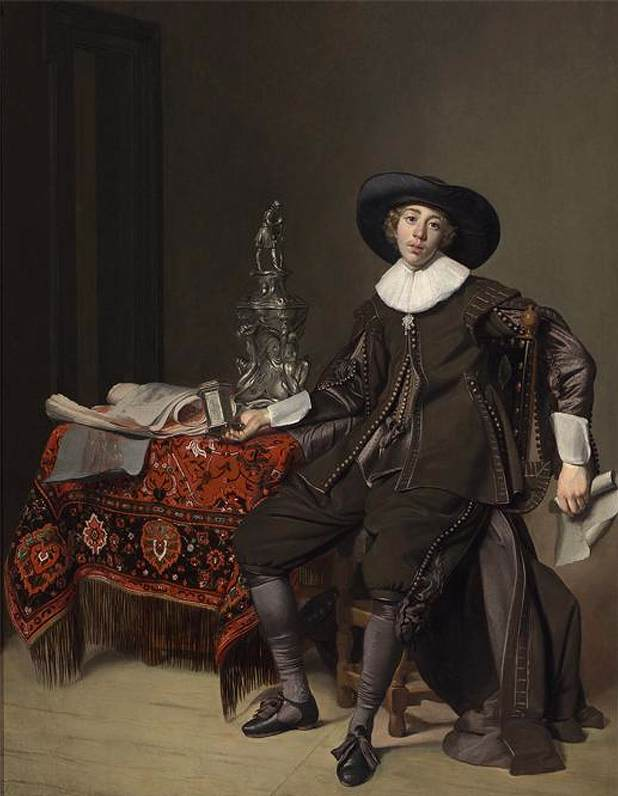
Portrait of a silversmith

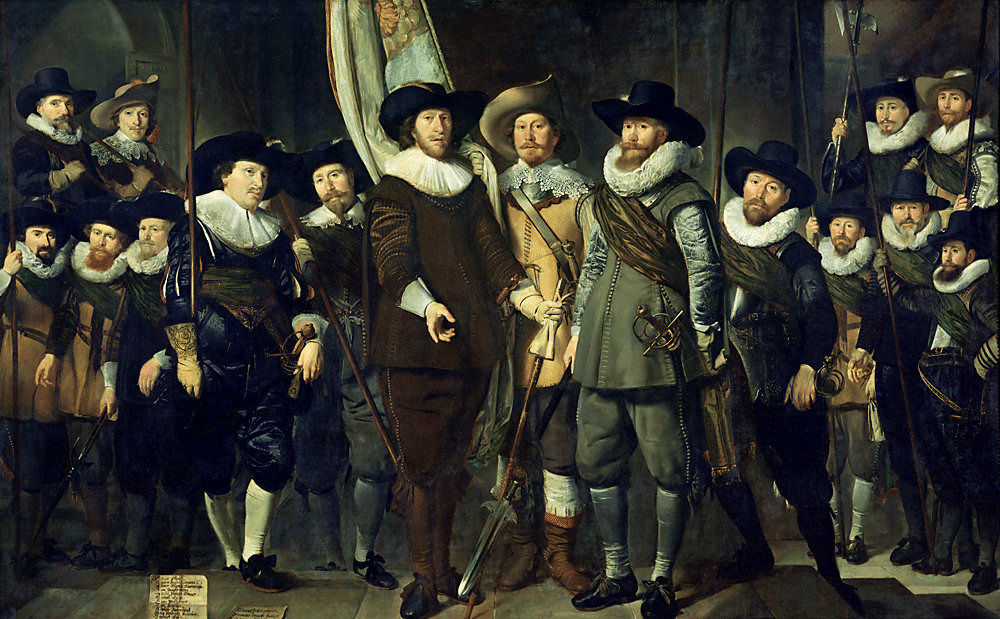
The militia company of captain Allaert Cloeck and lieutenant Lucas Jacobsz. Rotgans (1632)

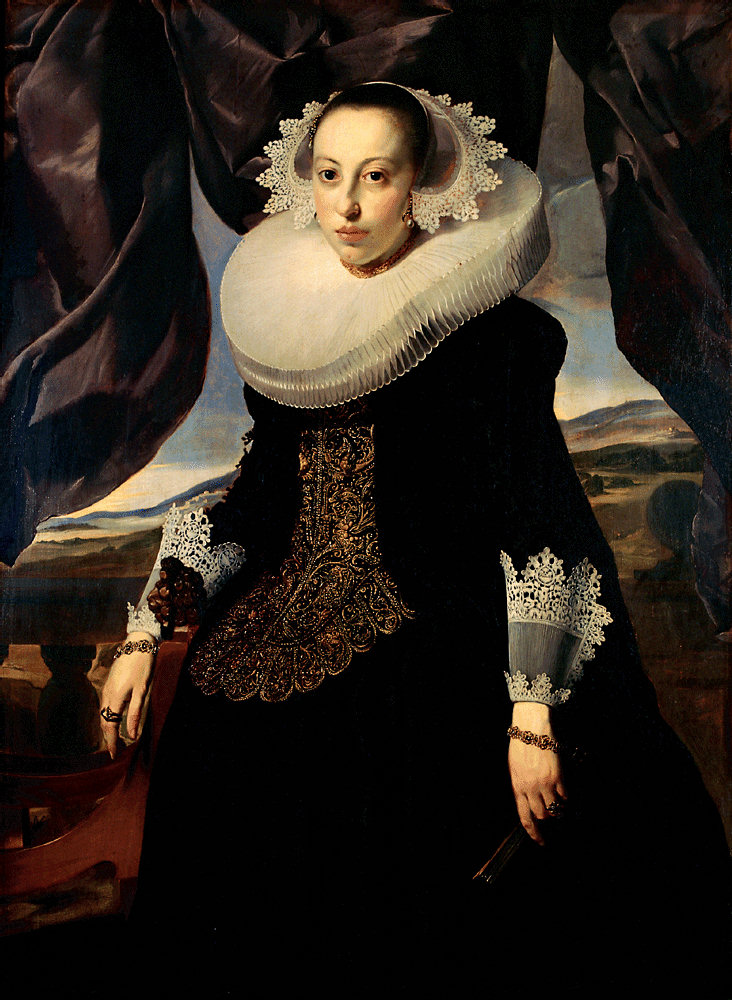
Portrait of a woman

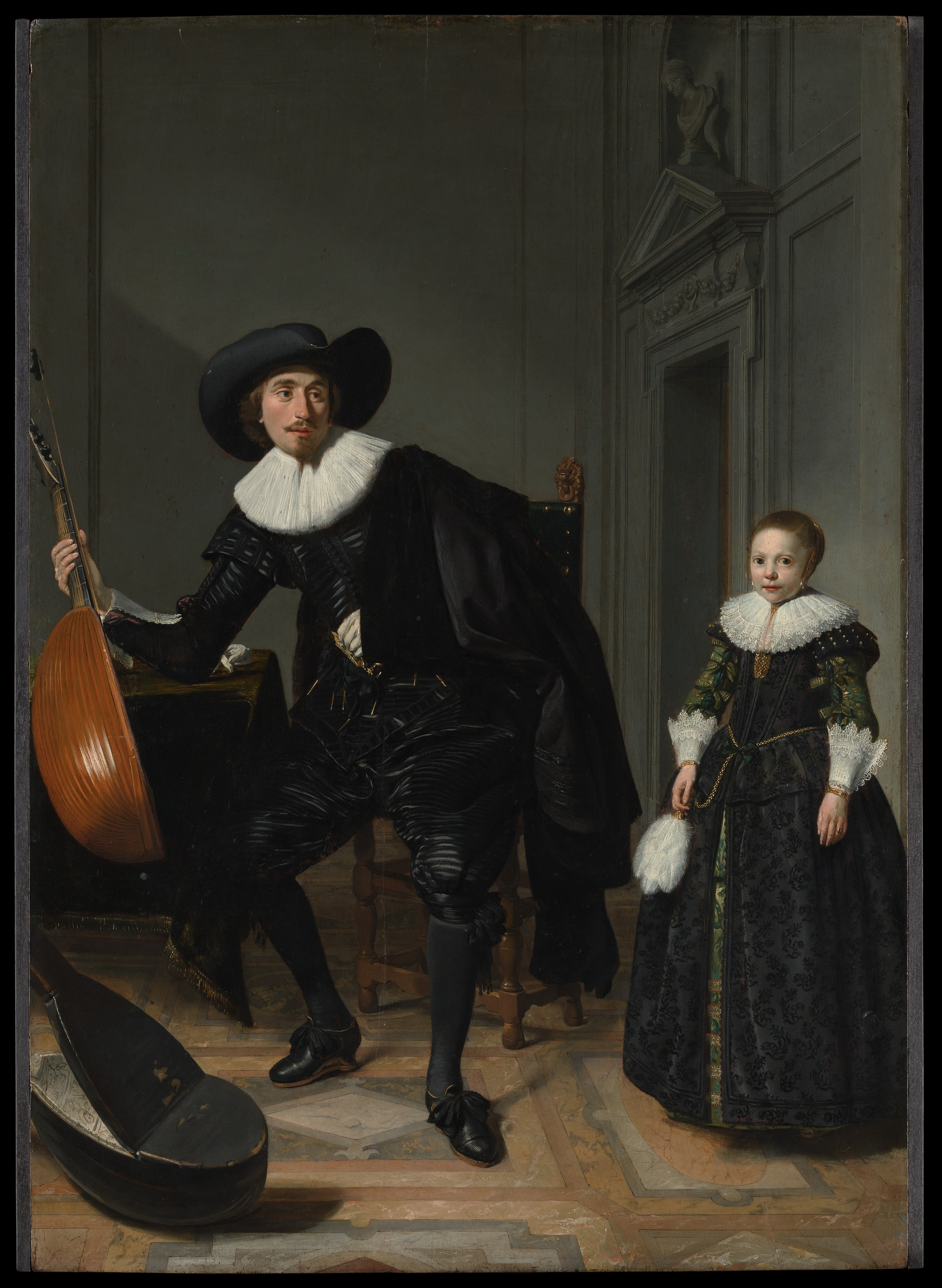
A Musician and His Daughter, 1629, Metropolitan Museum of Art.

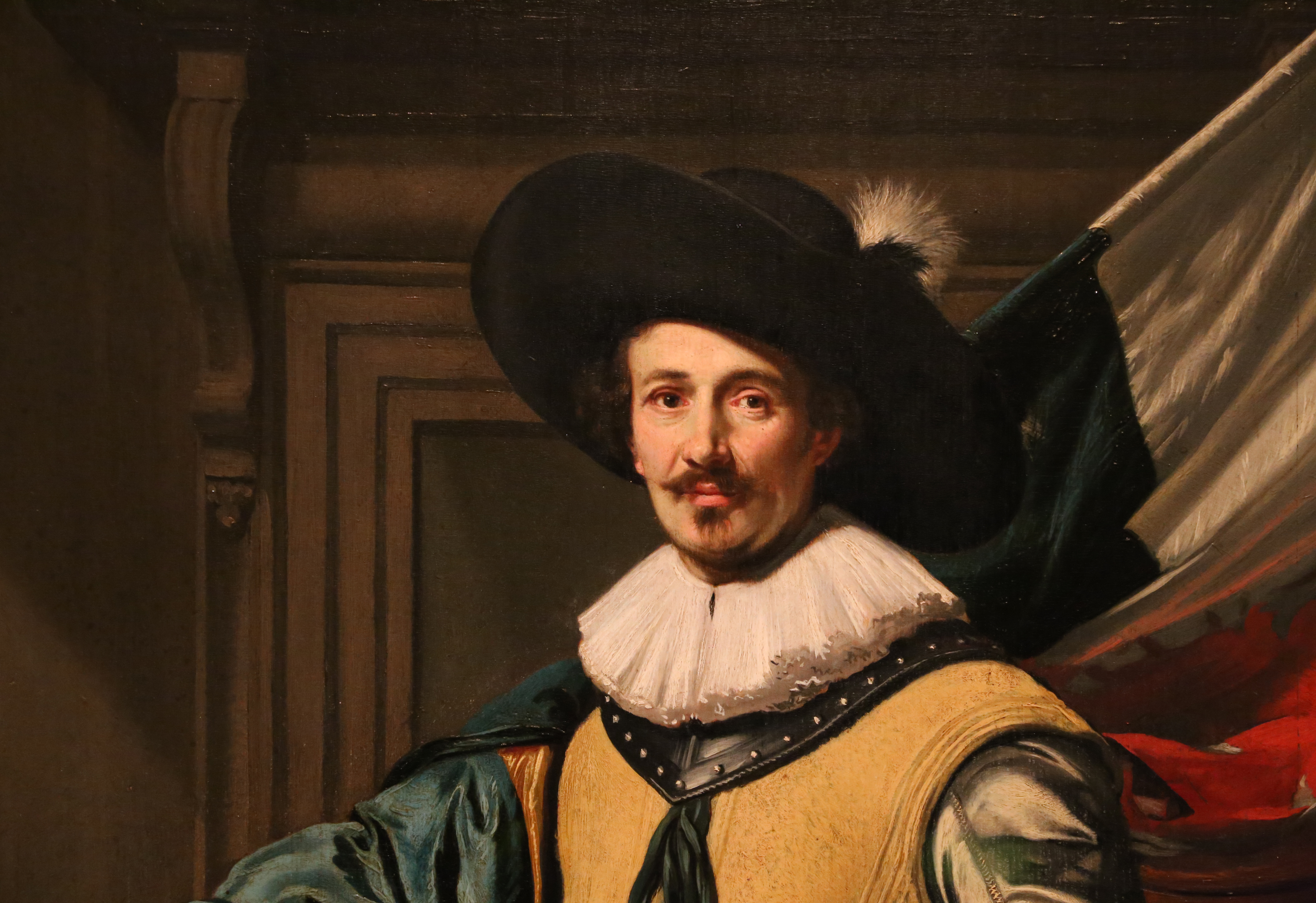
Portrait (detail) of Loeff Fredericx as an ensign by Thomas de Keyser (1626)

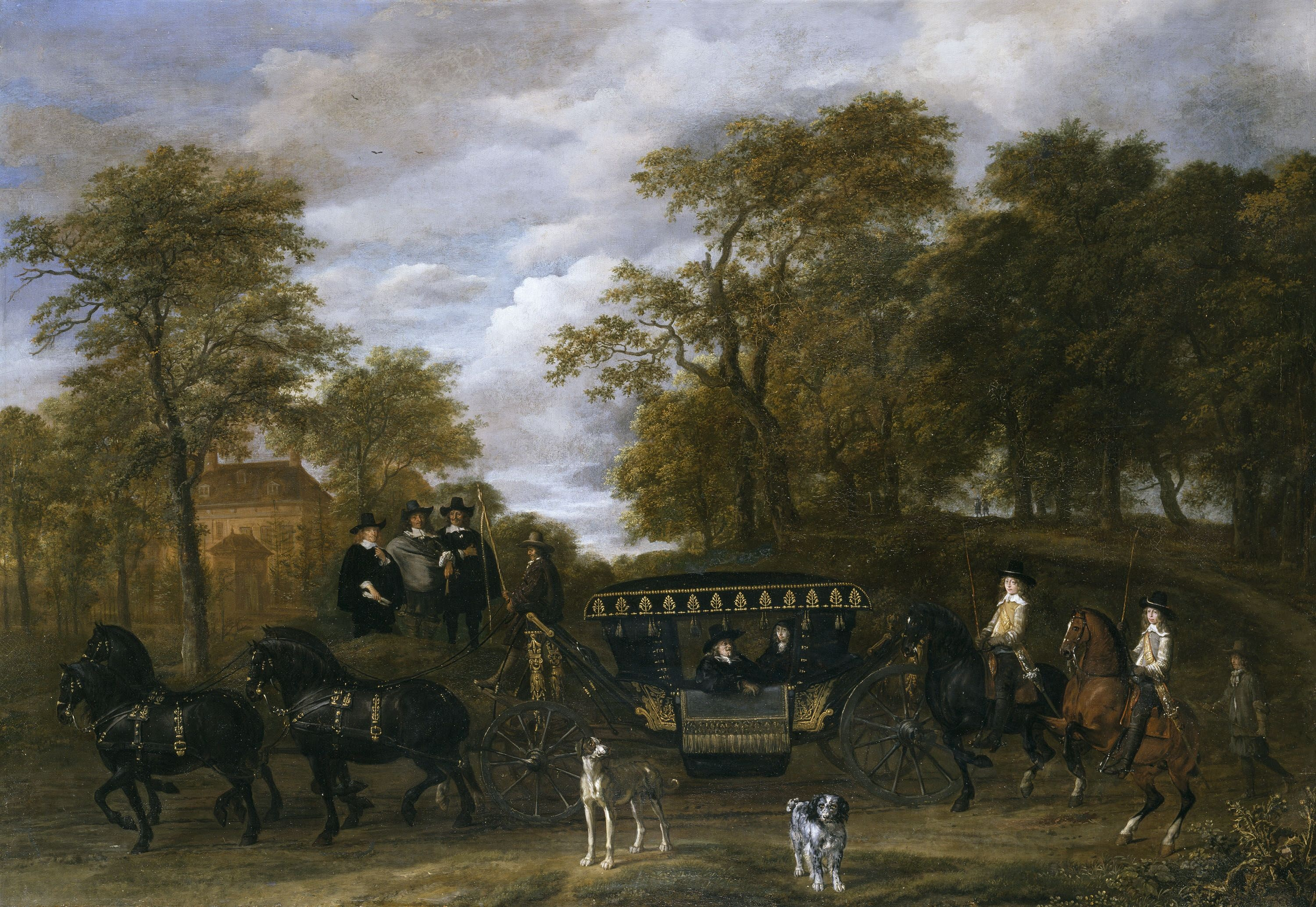
Cornelis de Graeff with his wife Catharina Hooft and his two sons Pieter and Jacob de Graeff on arrival at Soestdijk. Jacob van Ruisdael and Thomas de Keyser, (1656/1660), National Gallery of Ireland

== Sources ==
- Adams, Ann Jensen (2003). "Keyser, Thomas (Hendricksz.) de". Grove Art Online.
