= Fredrik A. Kayser =

Norwegian furniture designer

Fredrik A. Kayser (15 April 1924 – 19 August 1968) was a Norwegian furniture designer.

He was born in Bergen, and educated at the Norwegian National Academy of Craft and Art Industry. He was especially known for his designed chairs.
