= Willem de Keyser (architect) =

Dutch architect and sculptor

- Born: c. 1603
- Died: after 1680
- Occupations: Architect, sculptor
- Father: Hendrick de Keyser

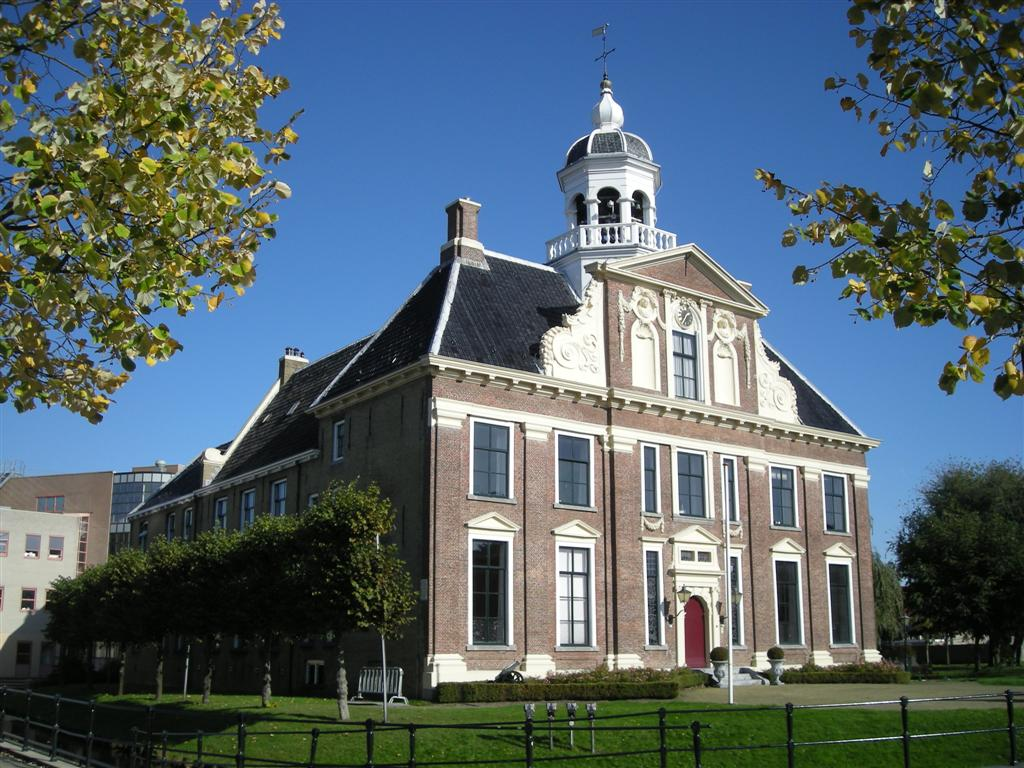
Crackstate in Heerenveen

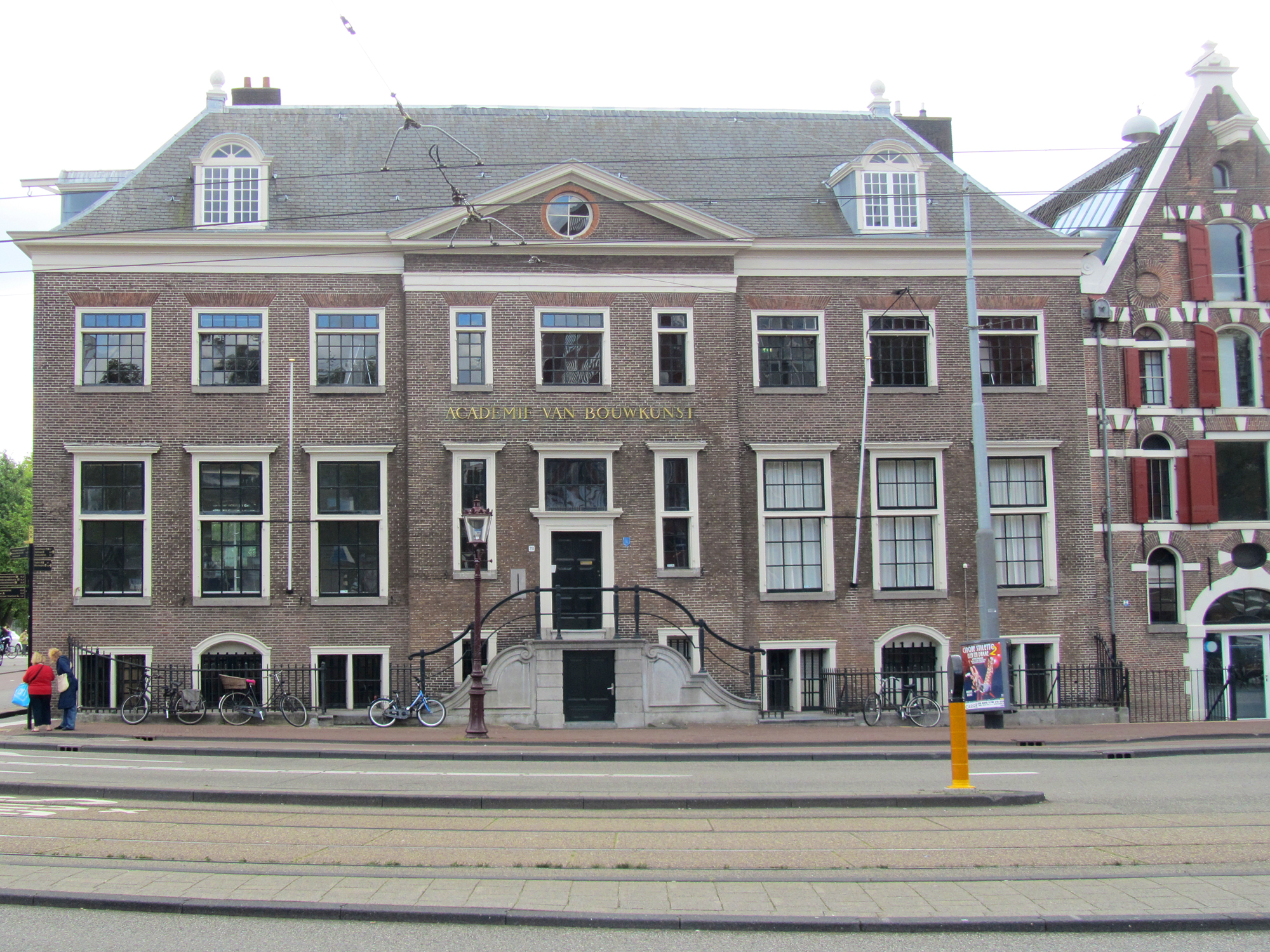
The Oudezijds Huiszittenhuis in Amsterdam

Willem Hendrickszoon de Keyser (1603 – after 1680) was a Dutch Golden Age architect and sculptor primarily active in Amsterdam and London.

He designed the Oudezijds Huiszittenhuis in Amsterdam and the Crackstate in Heerenveen, among others. Both buildings have attained rijksmonument status. He also sculpted reliefs for Amsterdam's new town hall (now the Royal Palace) and for the monumental tombs of the Dutch naval heroes Maarten Tromp, Michiel de Ruyter, and Jan van Galen. The relief adorning Tromp's tomb depicts the Battle of Scheveningen.

== Biography ==
Willem de Keyser was a son of the prominent Amsterdam architect Hendrick de Keyser. He was the brother of architect Pieter de Keyser (1595–1676), sculptor Hendrick de Keyser II (the Younger; 1613–1665), and painter Thomas de Keyser (c. 1596–1667).

Around 1623 he left Amsterdam to settle in London, where he found employment with his brother-in-law, the English architect Nicholas Stone, who had married Willem's sister Maria. Stone had been charged with the construction of a number of buildings in classical style designed by Inigo Jones for King Charles I of England. During his stay in England, De Keyser married Walburga Parker. He remained in England until 1640, when the turbulent English political situation forced him to return to Amsterdam.

On 13 August 1640 he was accepted as a master into the Amsterdam masons' guild, and on 3 December 1647 the city government appointed him master mason of the city (stadsmeestersteenhouwer). He assisted Jacob van Campen in designing and building Amsterdam's grand new town hall (now the Royal Palace) as well as the spire of the adjacent Nieuwe Kerk church.

On 20 February 1653 he was dismissed from his post as city mason on charges of fraud. De Keyser was alleged to have altered invoices and paid salaries to persons who were not actually employed. Van Campen nevertheless requested his services as a sculptor for the monumental tomb of Maarten Tromp in Delft's Oude Kerk church and the tomb of Jan van Galen in the Nieuwe Kerk in Amsterdam.

In 1658 he declared bankruptcy and left again for England. He was still living in England in 1674, but married in the Hague. He must have returned to Amsterdam not long thereafter, as he was working in 1678 on a monumental tomb for Michiel de Ruyter in the Nieuwe Kerk, over which he brought a case to court in 1680. It is not known when and where he died.

== Sources ==
- Willem de Keyser at the RKD databases
