= Gerd de Keijzer =

Dutch bicycle racer

Personal information
- Full name: Gerd de Keijzer
- Born: 18 January 1994 (age 32) Hoogeloon, Netherlands
- Height: 1.83 m (6 ft 0 in)
- Weight: 72.6 kg (160 lb)

Cycling career
- Sport: Cycling
- Current team: Team Novo Nordisk
- Discipline: Road
- Role: Rider

Amateur teams
- 2013–2014: Novo Nordisk Development
- 2018: ACM Cambrils–Ciclos Oleka
- 2019: Novo Nordisk Development

Professional teams
- 2015–2017: Team Novo Nordisk
- 2020–: Team Novo Nordisk

Gerd de Keijzer (born 18 January 1994, in Hoogeloon) is a Dutch cyclist, who currently rides for UCI ProTeam Team Novo Nordisk.
