= Willem de Keyser (painter) =

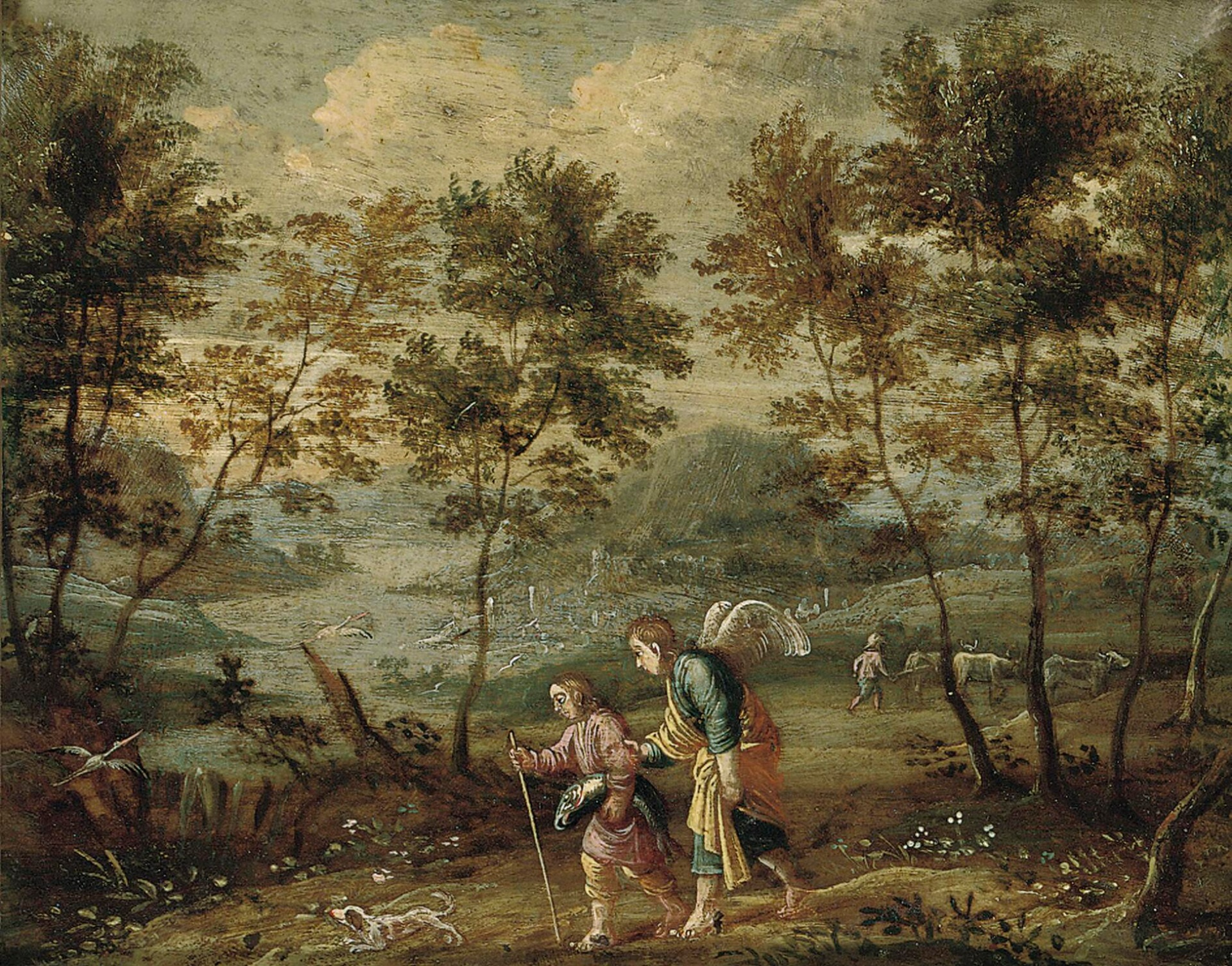
Boslandschap met Tobias en de Engel

Willem de Keyser or De Keysar (born c.1647) was a Flemish artist.

De Keyser was born in Antwerp about the year 1647. He was trained as a jeweller, but as an amateur practised in miniature, enamel, and oil-colours. Having painted some altar-pieces at Antwerp, his business called him to Dunkirk, where he painted a picture for the chapel of the English nuns, who were so pleased with it, that they persuaded De Keyser to go to England, and gave him letters of recommendation to Lord Melfort, then in favour with James II. The painter could not resist the proposal and embarked on board an English vessel, and, unknown to his wife or family, sailed for England. His reception was equal to his wishes. He was introduced to the king, who promised to countenance him, and several persons of rank, who had known him at Antwerp, encouraged him in his new vocation.

Transported with this prospect he sent for his wife, ordering her to dismiss his workmen, and convert his effects into money. Within half a year the bubble burst as the Glorious Revolution happened and De Keyser's friends could no longer be his protectors, his business decreased, and the pursuit of the philosopher's stone, to which he had recourse in his despair, completed his ruin. He died at the age of forty-five, about the year 1692. He left a daughter, whom he had taken great pains to instruct, and with success. She painted small portraits in oil, and copied well.
