= Keyser =

Keyser is a Dutch, Afrikaans and Norwegian surname meaning "emperor" or an Anglicized form of cognate surnames like German Kaiser. It may refer to:

== Places ==
- Keyser, Ontario, Canada
- Keyser, West Virginia, United States, a city named after William Keyser (see below)
  - Keyser Formation, a limestone bedrock unit in the Eastern United States named for Keyser, West Virginia
- Keyser Creek, a stream in Pennsylvania, United States
- Keyser Township, DeKalb County, Indiana, United States

== People ==
- Abraham Keyser, Jr. (1784–1873), New York State Treasurer 1824–1838
- Agnes Keyser (1852–1941), English humanitarian, courtesan and longtime mistress to Edward VII
- Andre Keyser (1938–2010), South African palaeontologist and geologist
- Brenda Keyser (born 1950s), Canadian (Manitoba) judge
- Brian Keyser (born 1969), American baseball pitcher
- Cassius Jackson Keyser (1862–1947), American mathematician
- Charles Keyser (1871–1965), Australian politician
- Charles Edward Keyser (1847–1929), British stockbroker and church architecture expert
- Charles L. Keyser (1930–2022), American Episcopal bishop
- Chris Keyser (born c.1960), American businesswoman
- Chris Keyser, American politician
- Christian Keyser (1877–1961), Bavarian Lutheran missionary of the Neuendettelsau Mission Society
- Christopher Keyser (born 1960), American screenwriter and producer
- Donald Keyser (born 1943), American diplomat and spy for Taiwan
- Ephraim Keyser (1850–1937), American sculptor
- Erich Keyser (1893–1968), German nazi writer and historian
- Ernest Wise Keyser (1876–1959), American sculptor
- F. Ray Keyser, Jr. (1927–2015), American (Vermont) lawyer and politician
- F. Ray Keyser, Sr. (1898–2001), American (Vermont) politician, lawyer, and judge
- Gerard Keyser (1910–1980), Dutch football goalkeeper
- Harriette A. Keyser (1841–1936), American industrial reformer and author
- Jacques Keyser (1885–1954), Dutch/French middle-distance runner
- Johan Michael Keyser (1749–1810), Norwegian theologian and priest
- Louisa Keyser (1845? - 1925), Native American basket weaver
- Peter Dirck Keyser (1835–1897), American ophthalmologist
- Pieter Dirkszoon Keyser (1540 – 1596), Dutch navigator
- Ragnhild Keyser (1889–1943), Norwegian painter
- Ralph S. Keyser (1883–1955), American Marine Corps marksman
- Rosy Keyser (born 1974), American abstract painter and sculptor
- Rudolf Keyser (1803–1864), Norwegian historian, archaeologist and educator
- Samuel Jay Keyser (born 1935), American theoretical linguist
- Vladimir Keyser (1878–?), Russian fencer
- William Keyser (1835–1904), American railroad executive

== Characters ==
- Keyser Söze, a character in the 1995 film The Usual Suspects

== See also ==
- De Keyser, Belgian surname
- Keijser, Dutch surname
- Keizer (disambiguation)
- Kaiser (disambiguation)
- Kyser, Anglicized surname
