= Rosy Keyser =

American contemporary painter (born 1974)

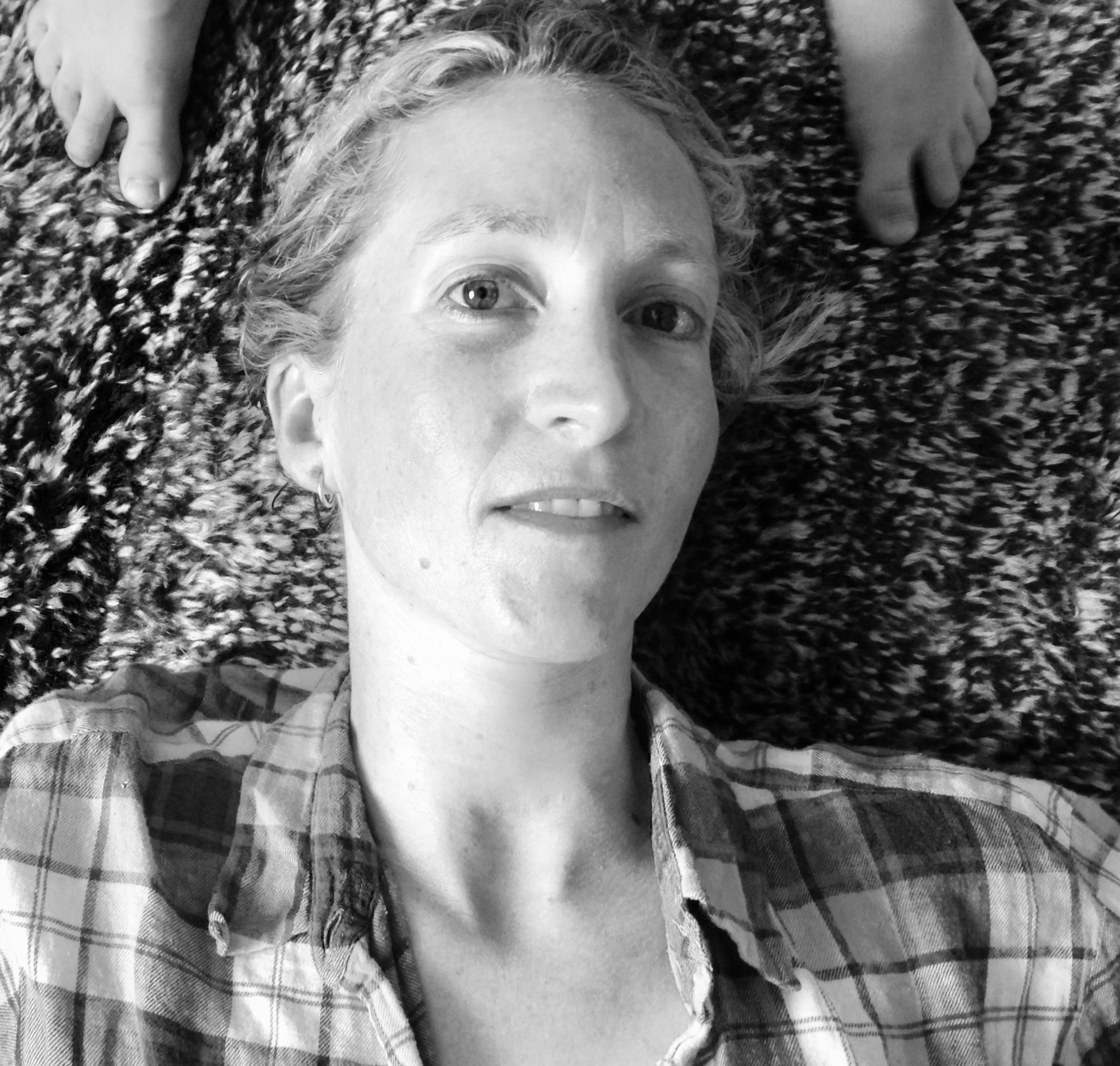
- Born: 1974 (age 51–52); Baltimore, Maryland, United States
- Education: Art Institute of Chicago
- Known for: Painting

Rosy Keyser (born 1974 in Baltimore, Maryland, United States) is an American contemporary painter, known for working in large-scale gestural, tactile abstraction. Frequently incorporating found detritus in her work such as beer cans, tarp, and sawdust, Keyser’s work investigates painting and sculpture in a bodily, aggressive way.

She lives and works in Brooklyn and Medusa, New York.

== Education ==
Keyser received her BFA from the Cornell University and received her MFA from the Art Institute of Chicago.

== Work ==
She is represented by CFA Berlin and Maccarone Gallery in New York.

== Exhibitions ==
Keyser has exhibited at institutions including Walker Art Center, Minneapolis, Minnesota;, The Zabludowicz Collection, London;, Louisiana Museum of Modern Art, Humlebaek, Denmark;, and Ballroom Marfa, Texas

=== Select solo exhibitions ===
- 2016: Lora Reynolds Gallery, Austin, TX (forthcoming)
- 2015: We Sing Sin, Contemporary Fine Arts, Berlin, Germany
- 2015: Lap of the High Plains, Freddy, Baltimore, MD
- 2015: The Hell Bitch, Maccarone, New York, NY
- 2014: My Heads Are My Hands, Karma, New York, NY
- 2013: Medusa Pie Country, Peter Blum Gallery, New York, NY
- 2011: Promethean Dub, Peter Blum Chelsea, New York, NY
- 2009: The Moon Ate Me, Peter Blum Chelsea, New York, NY
- 2008: Rivers Burn and Run Backward, Peter Blum Chelsea, New York, NY

=== Select group exhibitions ===
- 2017: Witches, September Gallery, Hudson, NY
- 2015: Object Painting- Painting Object, Johathan Viner Gallery, London, United Kingdom
- 2015: Community of Influence, Vermont Studio Center Alumni show at Spencer Brownstone Gallery, New York, NY
- 2014: Maximalism, Contemporary Fine Arts, Berlin, Germany
- 2014: White Columns Benefit Auction and Exhibition, White Columns, New York, NY
- 2014: New York Women, G Gallery, Houston, TX
- 2014: The Space Where I am, Blain Southern, London, United Kingdom
- 2013: The New Sincerity, Lora Reynolds Gallery, Austin, TX
- 2013: Painter Painter, curated by Eric Crosby and Bartholomew Ryan, The Walker Art Center, Minneapolis, MN
- 2013: Painting from the Zabludowicz Collection: Part II, The Zabludowicz Collection, London, United Kingdom
- 2012: Hue and Cry, Sotheby’s S2 Gallery, New York, NY
- 2012: Heat Waves, Peter Blum Chelsea, New York, NY
- 2012: Pink Caviar, Louisiana Museum of Modern Art, Humlebaek, Denmark
- 2012: Science on the Back End, Hauser and Wirth, New York, NY
- 2012: Luis Camnitzer, Rosy Keyser, Robert Kinmot, and Linda Matalon, Simone Subal Gallery, New York, NY
- 2011: Idealizing the Imaginary: Illusion and Invention in Contemporary Painting, Oakland University Art Gallery, Rochester, MI
- 2011: Miriam Bohm, Rosy Keyser, Erin Shirreff, Lisa Cooley, New York, NY
- 2011: A Painting Show, Harris Lieberman, New York, NY
- 2010: I Can’t Forget, But I Don’t Remember What, Freymond Guth Fine Art, Basel, Switzerland
- 2010: Black and White, Jason McCoy Gallery, New York, NY
- 2010: Spray, D’Amelio Terras, New York, NY
- 2010: Immaterial, Ballroom Marfa, Marfa, TX
- 2010: Reflection, Peter Blum Soho, New York, NY
- 2009: Almost, Nicelle Beauchene Gallery, New York, NY
- 2009: New Work, Reynolds Gallery, Richmond, VA
- 2009: Hi, Low and In Between, Grimm Fine Art, Amsterdam, the Netherlands
- 2008: Sack of Bones, Peres Project, Los Angeles, CA
- 2008: Zero Zone, Tracy Williams Ltd., New York, NY
- 2007: Stubborn Materials, Peter Blum Chelsea, New York, NY
- 2006: Durer Reenactment, Laeso, Denmark/Baltimore, MD
- 2005: Family Portraits and Energetic Blueprints, Rensselaerville, New York, NY
- 2005: 7-Year Installation, Track House (Remote Back Side), Marble, CO
- 2004: The Stray Show, Track House, Chicago, IL
- 2004: On A Wave, Jessica Murray Projects, Brooklyn, NY
- 2004: Yard Sale, Track House, Chicago, IL
- 2003: Sulcata Solves, Track House, Chicago, IL
- 2003: Depiction, Gallery 400 at The University of Illinois at Chicago, Chicago, IL
- 2003: The Impotent Landscape, The Pond, Chicago, IL

== Collections ==
The Louisiana Museum of Modern Art, Humlebæk, Denmark

The Maxine and Stuart Frankel Foundation, Bloomfield Hills, MI

The Portland Museum of Art, Portland, OR

Walker Art Center, Minneapolis, MN

The Zabludowicz Collection, London, United Kingdom

== Press ==
- Review by Louisa Elderton, Flash Art, January - February 2016
- Review, Artnews, Summer 2015
- Review by Roberta Smith, The New York Times, May 2015
- Review, Art in America, May 2015
- Review by Anneliese Cooper, Blouin Artinfo, May 2015
- Profile by Barbara A. MacAdam, ARTnews, March 2014
