= Kyser =

Kyser is a surname. Notable people with the surname include:

- Kay Kyser (1905–1985), American bandleader and radio personality
- Kurt Kyser (1951-2017), Canadian mineralogist and geochemist
- Michale Kyser (born 1991), American basketball player

== See also ==
- Kaiser (disambiguation)
- Keyser (disambiguation)
- Kyser Lake
