= Wijnkopersgildehuis =

Coordinates: 52°22′19″N 4°53′54″E

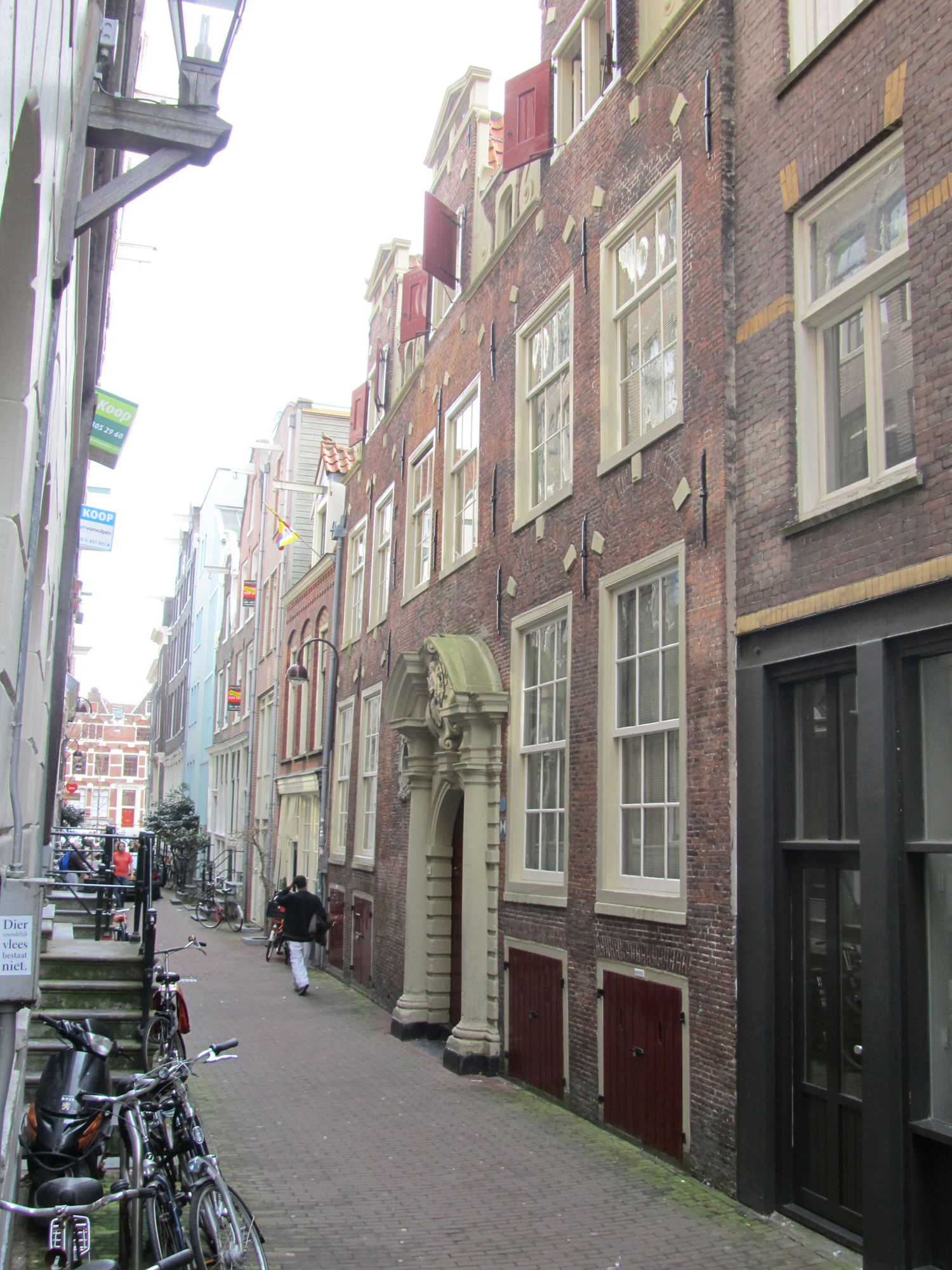
The Wijnkopersgildehuis

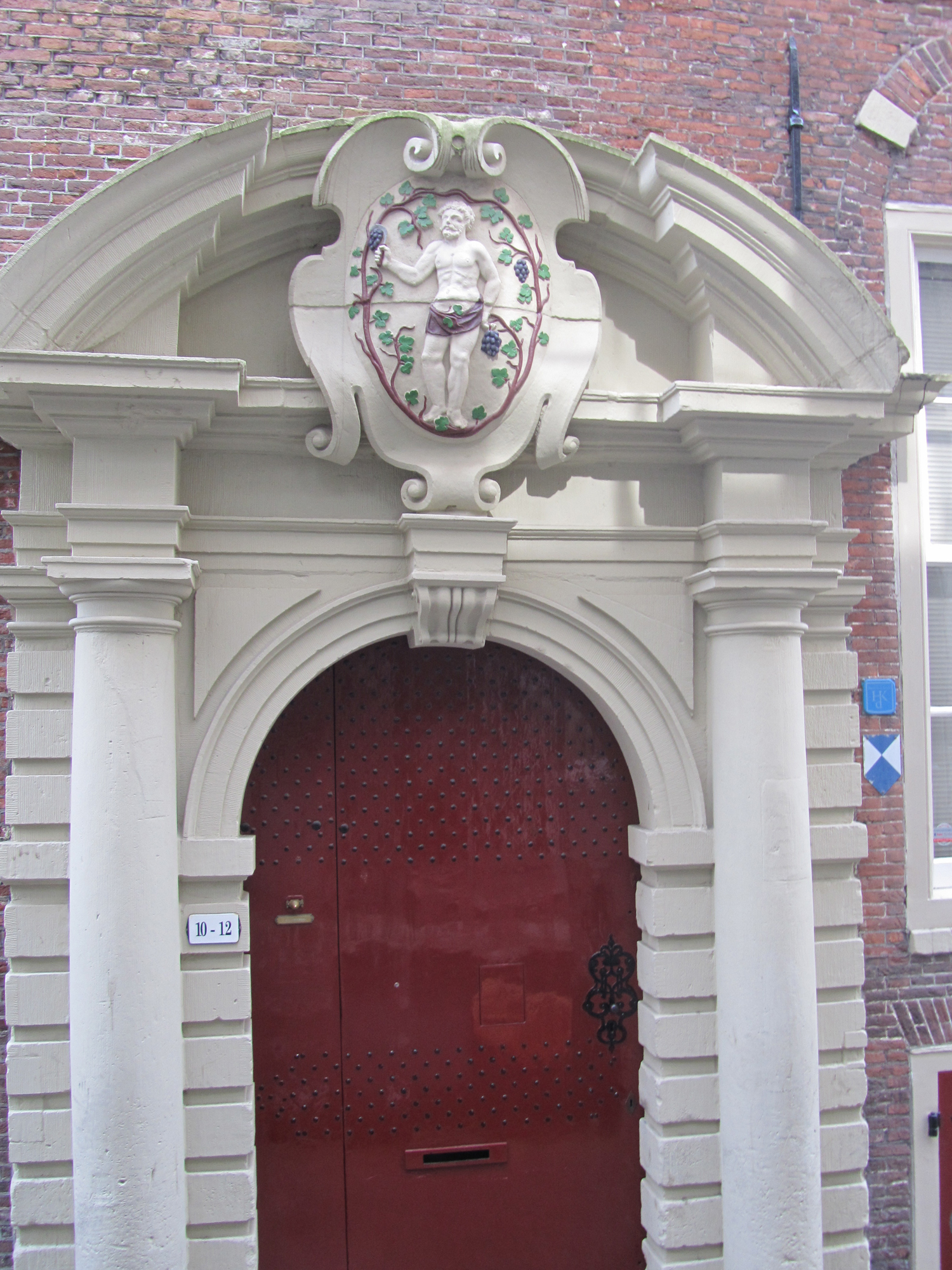
Entrance gate, a design by Pieter de Keyser

The Wijnkopersgildehuis ("Wine buyers' guildhall") is a former guildhall in Amsterdam. The 17th-century double house is located at Koestraat 10–12, near Nieuwmarkt square. It is one of the few remaining guildhalls in Amsterdam and has the oldest known neck-gables. The building has rijksmonument status.

The guildhall is owned by the historic preservation society Vereniging Hendrick de Keyser. The building served as a museum for a number of years during the second half of the 20th century. Currently (2012), it is rented out as a residence with an artist's workshop.

== Description ==
The Wijnkopersgildehuis facade is decorated with support arches (ontlastingsbogen) over the windows made of sandstone blocks. The facade is topped by three neck-gables with ornate side-pieces (klauwstukken). The 1633 entrance gate is made out of natural stone and was designed by Pieter de Keyser. The gate pediment depicts Pope Urban I, patron saint of wine cultivation and trade. The basic layout of the interior is a voorhuis (front part of the house) with side-rooms. In the hallway, the original floor beams are still present, possibly dating back to the 16th century. The guild room (gildezaal) in the achterhuis (back part of the house) measures 6 by 9 meters, and also still has the original floor beams. Bridging the gap between the hall and guild room is a small stone stairway counting four steps.

In the hall, two gable stones have been placed into the wall. One of these, dating from 1701, originally adorned the building at Spuistraat 77 and depicts a cooper. The second, originally from the building at Vijzelstraat 39, depicts a wine trader and one of his customers in a wine bottling workshop. This gable stone carries the inscription De Wyn De Mackt Fracht Dat / Menych Hart Voerhuecht. An 18th-century gable stone has been added the back facade, on the inner courtyard, depicting a salamander surrounded by flames, a symbol traditionally used by apothecaries.

== History ==
Koestraat, the street where the Wijnkopersgildehuis is located, was originally part of the terrain around the Bethaniënklooster monastery. On the location of the Wijnkopersgildehuis, three houses were built around 1551. The building as it stands today was created in 1611, when the investor Claes Jansz Geus joined the three houses behind a single facade with three neck-gables. The remodeling was done by the mason Hendrick Gerritsz, among others. The new building was called Het Vergulde Leeuwshooft ("the gilded lion's head"). The oldest sections of the original houses were lost during renovations in 1633 and 1655.

In 1613 the building started to be used as an inn, known as De Toelast. The building was purchased in 1630 by the guild of wine buyers, who had it radically altered by the Amsterdam master mason Pieter de Keyser. In 1633 the right wing of the building (Koestraat number 10) began to be used as guildhall, with a meeting room for the guild directors at the front, a new back wing with a communal guild room (gildezaal), large cellars for storage, and an entrance gate designed by Pieter de Keyser. This gate originally depicted Bacchus astride a barrel of wine, but this was later replaced with an image of the saint Urban. The left part of the building (Koestraat number 12) became a residence.

The guild room was modernised around 1757. New additions included a wooden entrance door in Louis Quinze-style with carved grapevines. Around the same time, the original kruiskozijnen windows (with a horizontal and vertical beam dividing them into four sections) were replaced with more modern sliding windows.

In 1798, during the French Revolutionary period, all guilds in the Netherlands were dissolved, including the wine buyers' guild. The two sections of the building were sold in 1818 and 1821 respectively. Subsequently, the building was used as a theater, office space and inexpensive residential space, among others. In 1917, Koestraat 10 was purchased by the wine buyer Jacobus Th. Boelen. At that moment, 13 families were living in the building. A year later, he also purchased Koestraat 12. Following restoration, the entire building was rented out. The purchase and restoration of the building led Boelen and others to found the historic preservation society Vereniging Hendrick de Keyser in 1918, with Boelen as the first chairman. The building was bought by the society in 1947. It underwent restoration in 1921, 1950–1953, and 1956–1957. During the last restoration, an 18th-century fireplace, originally from another building, was placed.

In 1950, the residential part of the building was converted into exhibition space, and in 1951 the Medisch-Pharmaceutisch Museum ("medical-pharmaceutical museum") was housed in the building, followed by a wine museum in 1961. Currently (2012), the building is no longer in use as a museum.

The Wijnkopersgildehuis received rijksmonument status in 1970.
