= Statue of Erasmus =

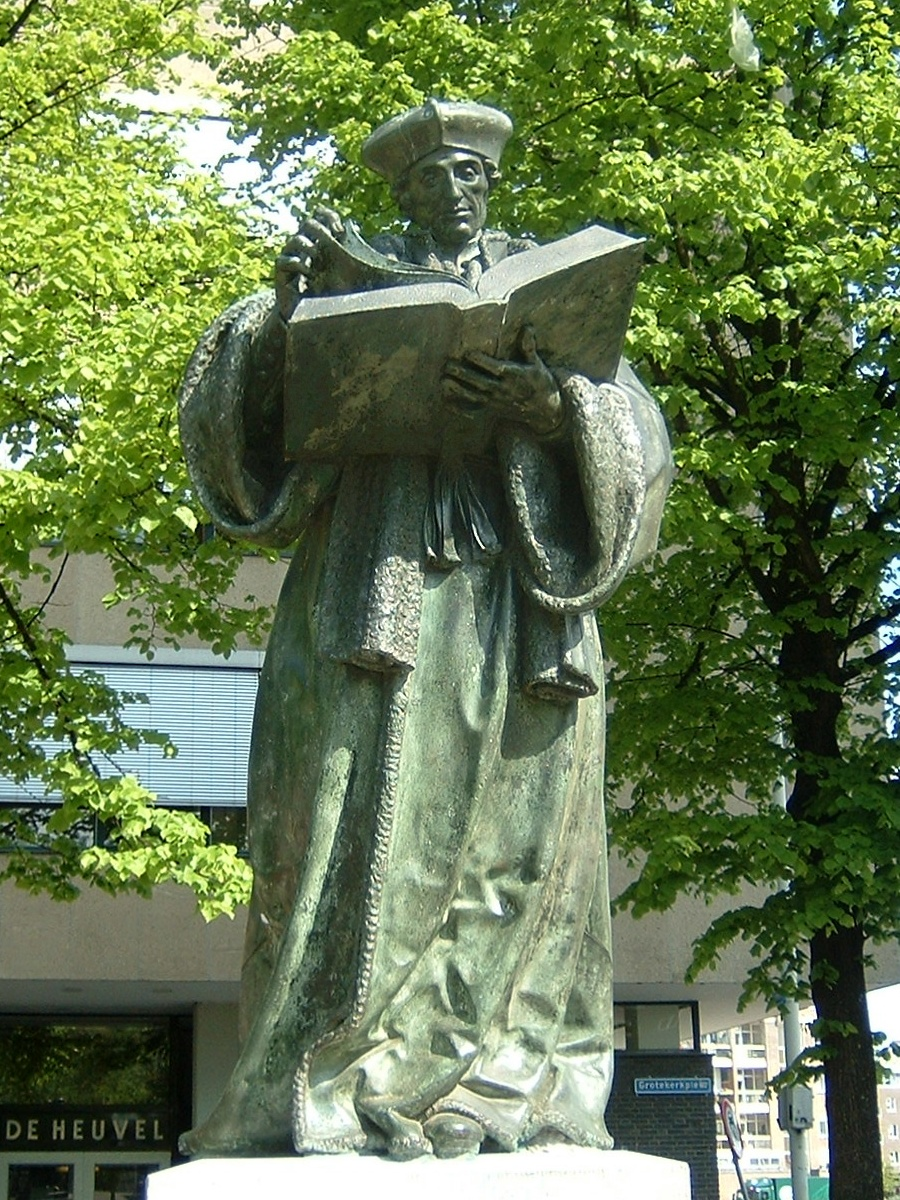
- Location: Grotekerkplein, Rotterdam
- Designer: Hendrick de Keyser
- Material: Bronze
- Height: 223 cm
- Weight: 1,554 kg
- Dedicated date: 22 April 1622
- Restored date: 1677, 1964, 1998

The Statue of Erasmus is a public monument by Hendrick de Keyser in Rotterdam, the Netherlands.

== History ==
=== Earlier statues in wood and stone ===
The succession of statues dedicated to Erasmus is testimony to the civic pride he elicited in his native city. A first statue is mentioned by early-17C printer Matthijs Bastiaensz as having been sent in 1536, the year of Erasmus's death, by the civic leaders of Basel where he died, but is not otherwise attested.

A wooden statue was erected on the occasion of Philip of Habsburg's princely visit in Rotterdam on 27 1549. It played a specific role in the visit's choreography. The statue was hollow and enabled a young boy to stay inside. As Philip approached, the boy recited a Latin poem, making it appear as if Erasmus himself was praising the visitor.

In 1557 a more durable statue of Erasmus was made in Belgian blue stone, paid for by the now King of Spain, Philip II. In 1572, during the War of Holland, Spanish troops under Count of Bossu threw the statue into a canal. It was later recovered and placed on the Grotemarkt.

=== The bronze statue ===
On 18 April 1616, the City of Rotterdam decided to commission a new statue, following a recommendation from Hugo Grotius who had become Pensionary of the city in 1613. Hendrick de Keyser, who in 1614 had received the commission for the tomb of William the Silent in Delft, was selected and contracted on 29 August 1618. The statue was cast after his death on 5 May 1621 by local founder Jan Cornelisz. Ouderogge, under supervision by Hendrick's son Pieter de Keyser. The statue was eventually erected on 30 April 1622. Its cost exceeded 10,000 guilders, a very large sum for a work of art. It was originally gilded, but soon took a green patina.

Joost van den Vondel wrote a poem about it that same year, titled To the splendid metal statue in Rotterdam erected in honour of the great Erasmus.

It was the first public statue in bronze in the Netherlands, and unique in Europe as it honored an intellectual luminary rather than a military or political leader.

Erasmus is depicted as a theologian, reading a large Bible. Local legend has it that Erasmus turns a page of the book every hour at the stroke of the clock, as was reported by several foreigners.

=== Later developments ===
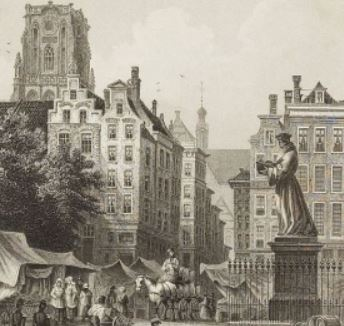
The statue in the 17th century

In 1674, the statue was deposed for repairs as it was at risk of falling over. It was re-erected on 22 April 1677.

The current pedestal is a modern copy of the one that was created on this occasion. It displays two inscriptions in Latin. The first quote, by writer and illustrator Joachim Oudaan (1628-1692), reads: DESIDERIO ERASMO / MAGNO SCIENTIARVM ATQUE LITTERATVRAE / POLITIORIS VINDICI ET INSTAVRATORI / VIRO SAECVLI SVI PRIMARIO / CIVI OMNIVM PRAESTANTISSIMO / AC NOMINIS IMMORTALITATEM SCRIPTIS / AEVITERNIS IVRE CONSECVTO / S.P.Q. ROTERODAMVS / NE QVOD TANTIS APVD SE / SVOSQVE POSTEROS / VIRTVTIBVS PRAEMIVM DEESSET / STATVAM HANC EX AERE PVBLICO / ERIGENDAM CVRAVERUNT. The second quote, by Nicolaas Heinsius the Elder, reads: BARBARIAE TALEM SE DEBELLATOR ERASMVS / MAXIMA LAVS BATAVI NOMINIS ORE TVLIT / REDDIDIT EN FATIS ARS OBLVCTATA SINISTRIS / DE TANTO SPOLIVM NACTA QVOD VRNA VIRO EST / INGENII COELESTE IVBAR MAIVSQVE CADVCO / TEMPORE QVI REDDAT SOLVS ERASMVS ERIT.

In 1940 ahead of the German invasion, the statue was moved to a protected location, buried under the courtyard of the Museum Boijmans Van Beuningen. On 29 July 1945 it was re-erected, intact, on Coolsingel; it was moved to its current location in 1964.

It was listed as a Rijksmonument on 11 September 1973.

The statue was torn down by vandals in 1996 but did not suffer major damage. It was subsequently repaired and re-erected on 29 January 1998.

== Erasmus Monument ==
In October 2016, a separate Erasmus monument was unveiled nearby, on the site of the house where Erasmus was born in 1466 (according to current scholarly consensus). It evokes the disappeared house's facade and is covered with blue-and-wide tiles that evoke Erasmus and his works.
