= Bethaniënklooster =

Former 15th-century monastery in Amsterdam

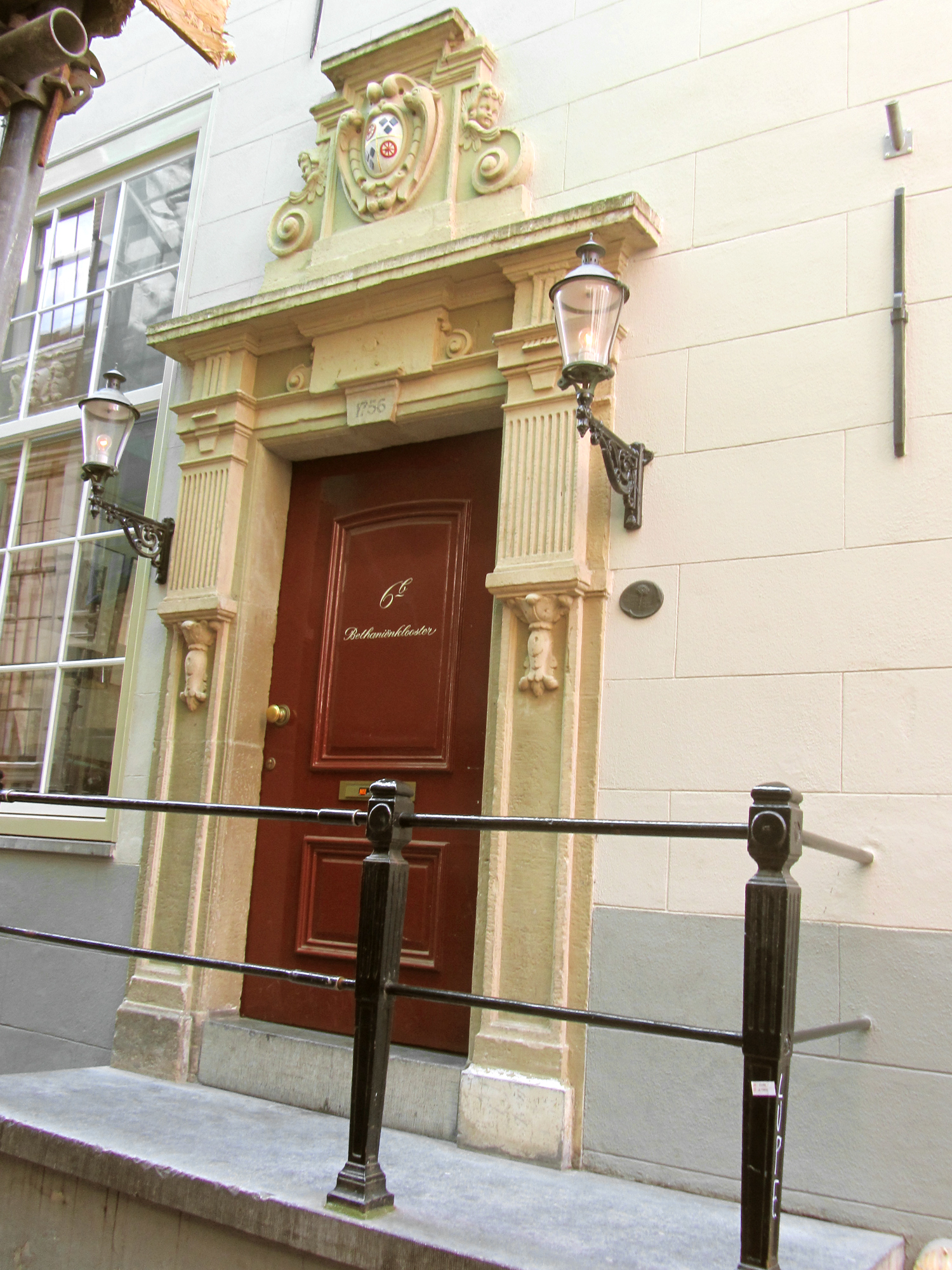
- Entrance of the Bethaniënklooster at Barndesteeg
- Interactive map of the Bethaniënklooster area

General information
- Location: Barndesteeg 6, Amsterdam, Netherlands
- Coordinates: 52°22′20″N 4°53′54″E

Website
- https://web.archive.org/web/20120531002658/http://www.bethanienklooster.nl/

The Bethaniënklooster is a former 15th-century monastery in the Wallen area of Amsterdam. It is one of the few remains of the once-expansive area of monasteries that dominated the oudezijde ("old side") of town in the Middle Ages. The monastery was devoted to Mary of Bethany (Mary Magdalene) and, at its largest extent, encompassed the entire area between Bloedstraat and Oude Hoogstraat streets to the north and south and Oudezijds Achterburgwal and Kloveniersburgwal canals to the west and east.

The only surviving remains of the monastery are the northern wing in Barndesteeg alley and some wall fragments in Gedempte Huidenvetterssloot alley. The building in the Barndesteeg is now in use as a concert hall. Some 120 concerts are held there yearly, attracting 5,000 to 10,000 visitors. In addition to concerts, lectures, weddings and other gatherings are also held there. The building has two storeys which have been largely joined into a single hall. It also has a vaulted crypt which still largely dates to around 1450, when the monastery was founded. The attic is now used as student accommodation. The building has held rijksmonument status since 1970.

The street names Bethaniënstraat, Bethaniëndwarsstraat, and Koestraat are reminders of the monastery. The name "Koestraat" ("Cow Street") is a reminder of the cattle that were raised by the nuns as livestock for the meat served at banquets of the schutterijen (citizen militia companies).

== History ==
=== Monastery ===
The Klooster van Sinte Maria Magdalena van Bethaniën ("Monastery of Saint Mary Magdalene of Bethany") was founded in the 1450s and was one of a number of monastic complexes along the oudezijde ("old side") of town, directly beyond the city walls along Kloveniersburgwal canal. In 1462, the chapter of the Hofkapel in The Hague granted the monastery the privilege to build its own chapel with a churchyard and to have its own rector or chaplain.

The Bethaniënklooster was a monastery of Augustinian nuns where "fallen" women could do penance. The monastery became popular with the rich elite and the poor women that originally inhabited the monastery were gradually replaced with well-off nuns and proveniers (elderly women who had paid a one-time sum for lifelong room and board). In 1462, around 220 women lived at the monastery. Their duties include raising cattle as livestock for the meat served at banquets of the schutterijen (citizen militia companies).

In the 16th century, the popularity of the nunnery declined and the monastery no longer had enough money to pay for its upkeep. In order to raise funds, part of the monastery complex was sold off to be used for housing. In 1506, the Bethaniënstraat was widened and houses were built along the street. In 1525 the Koestraat was constructed through the complex and houses were built along this street as well; the chapel of the monastery was now on a public street. In 1535, another section of the monastery terrain was sold off to the city, and in 1553 a large section of the building next to the monastery entrance on Oudezijds Achterburgwal canal was rented out.

=== Later use ===
Following the Alteratie in 1578, the monastery complex was seized by the new Protestant city government, and in 1585 the order was abolished. The nine remaining nuns still living at the monastery were relocated to the Begijnhof and Clarissenklooster. The monastery was rented out to various residents, including the painter and inventor Jan van der Heyden and the painter Johannes van der Capelle. The composer Jan Pieterszoon Sweelinck lived in one of the new houses constructed on the former monastery terrain.

In 1594, the Latin school for the oudezijde ("old side") of town was relocated to the nave of the former monastery chapel. The school was merged with the nieuwezijde ("new side") Latin school in 1678 into a single school, the predecessor of the current Barlaeus Gymnasium.

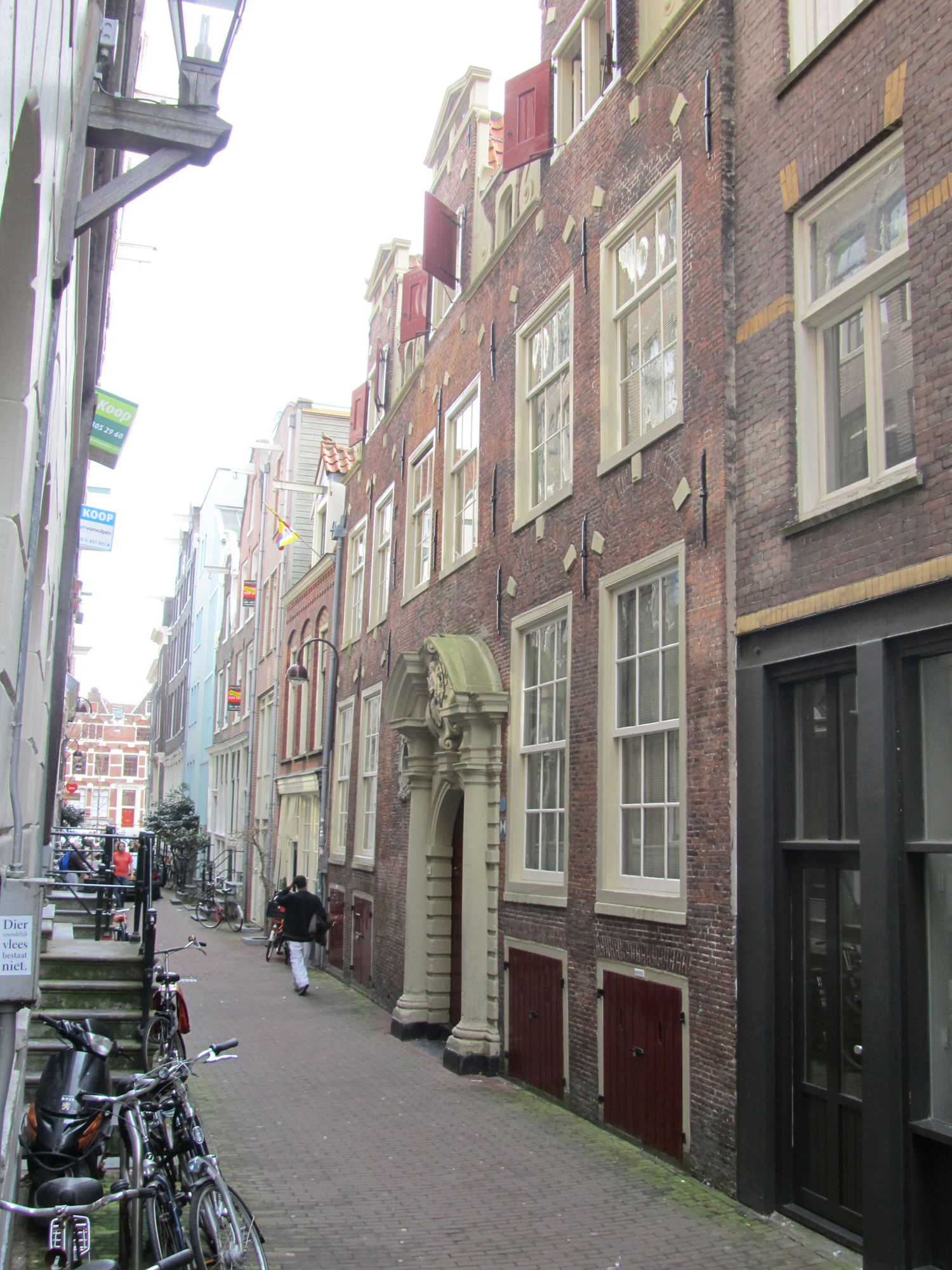
The Wijnkopersgildehuis guildhall

Three residences built around 1551 on Koestraat were merged into a single building in 1633 and used as a guildhall for the wine buyers' guild, the Wijnkopersgildehuis, one of the few still-surviving guildhalls in Amsterdam.

The former monastery was used for a number of years as an inn. In 1736, half of the building was torn down and replaced with three houses; the remainder of the building was sold off bit by bit. The only surviving section of the building is the northern wing in Barndesteeg alley, as well as some wall fragments on the former Huidenvetterssloot canal.

In the 18th century, the building in Barndesteeg alley was used as a clandestine church (schuilkerk) by the Old Catholic parish, which purchased the building in 1705 and dedicated it to the saints Peter and Paul. The floor between the refectory and dormitory was largely demolished in order to join the two storeys into one large church space. The church was nicknamed De Ooievaar ("The Stork") after the gable stone, depicting a stork. The church pulpit is now used in the Old Catholic church at Ruysdaelstraat 39, built in 1914 to replace the schuilkerk at Barndesteeg.

During the 20th century, the building served various purposes. Around 1970 it housed a carpentry workshop. The building eventually became derelict and was condemned. The building was subsequently purchased by the city government with the intent to restore it. On the initiative of the sculptor Geurt Brinkgreve and others, a foundation was created to oversee the restoration, the Stichting Bethaniënklooster (since merged with Stichting Jan Pietersz. Huis). On the attic floor of the building, 10 rooms for music students were created. The main hall was repurposed as a concert hall.
