= Oost-Indisch Huis =

Coordinates: 52°22′15″N 4°53′53″E

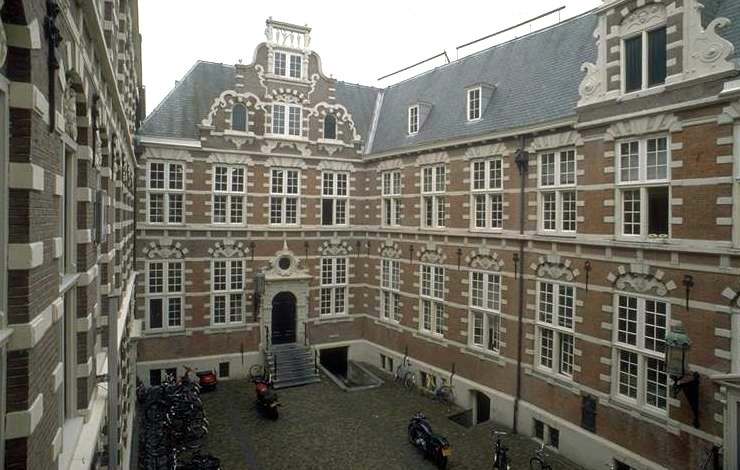
- Inner courtyard of the Oost-Indisch Huis. Source: bma.amsterdam.nl
- Interactive map of Oost-Indisch Huis
- Type: building
- Location: Kloveniersburgwal 48; 1012 CX Amsterdam

History
- Built: 1606, 1633
- Built for: Dutch East India Company
- Original use: headquarters, Dutch East India Company

Site notes
- Architect: Hendrick de Keyser
- Owner: University of Amsterdam
- Website: http://www.uva.nl/locaties/binnenstad/bushuis.html

Rijksmonument
- Type: Historical
- Reference no.: 2012

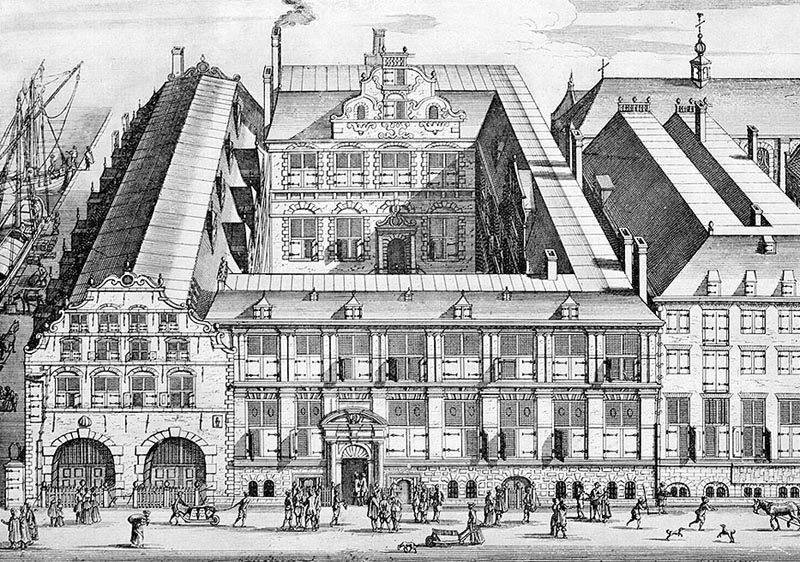
17th-century etching of the Oost-Indisch Huis. Source: bma.amsterdam.nl

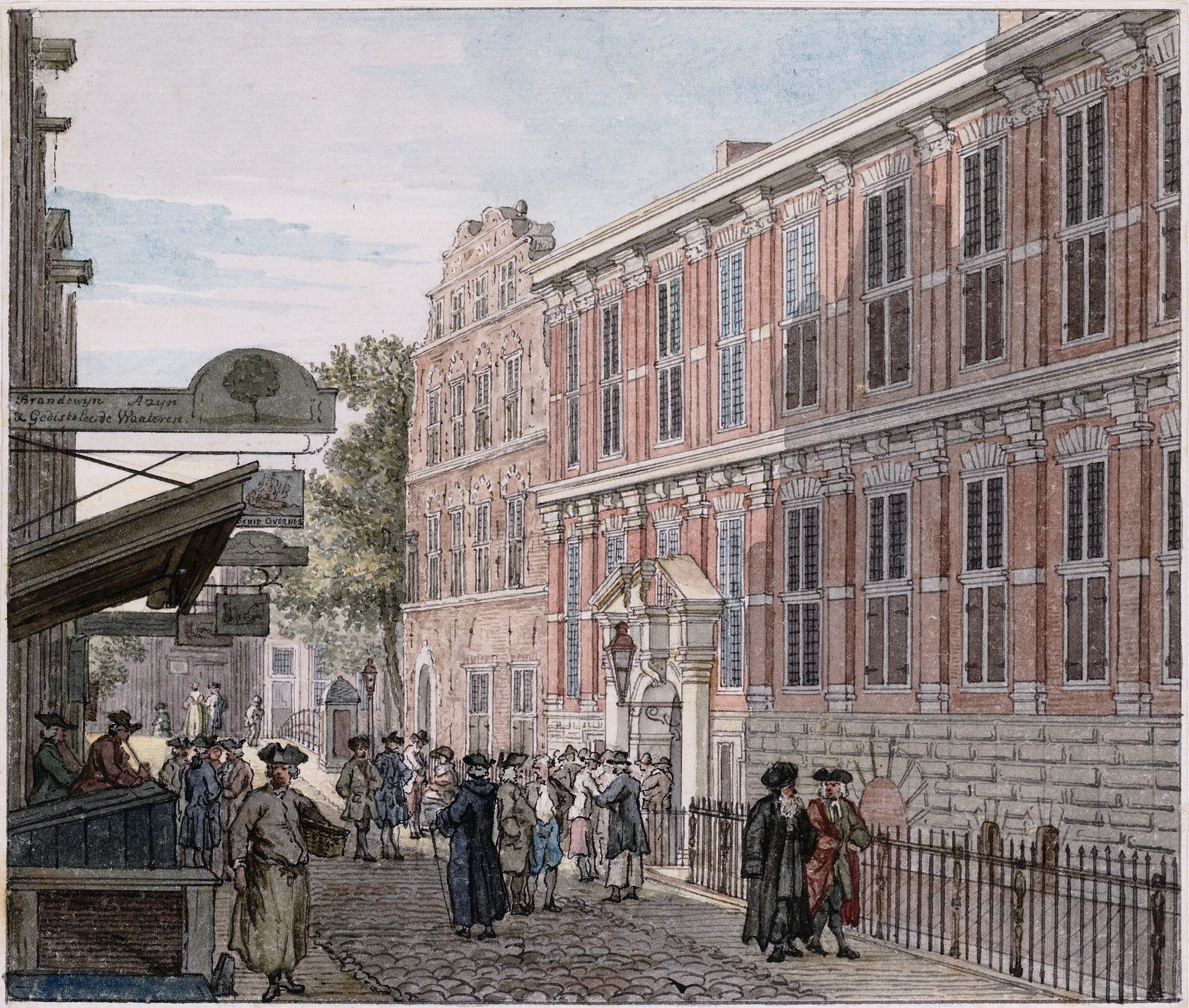
Oost-Indisch Huis by Reinier Vinkeles, 1768. Source: bma.amsterdam.nl

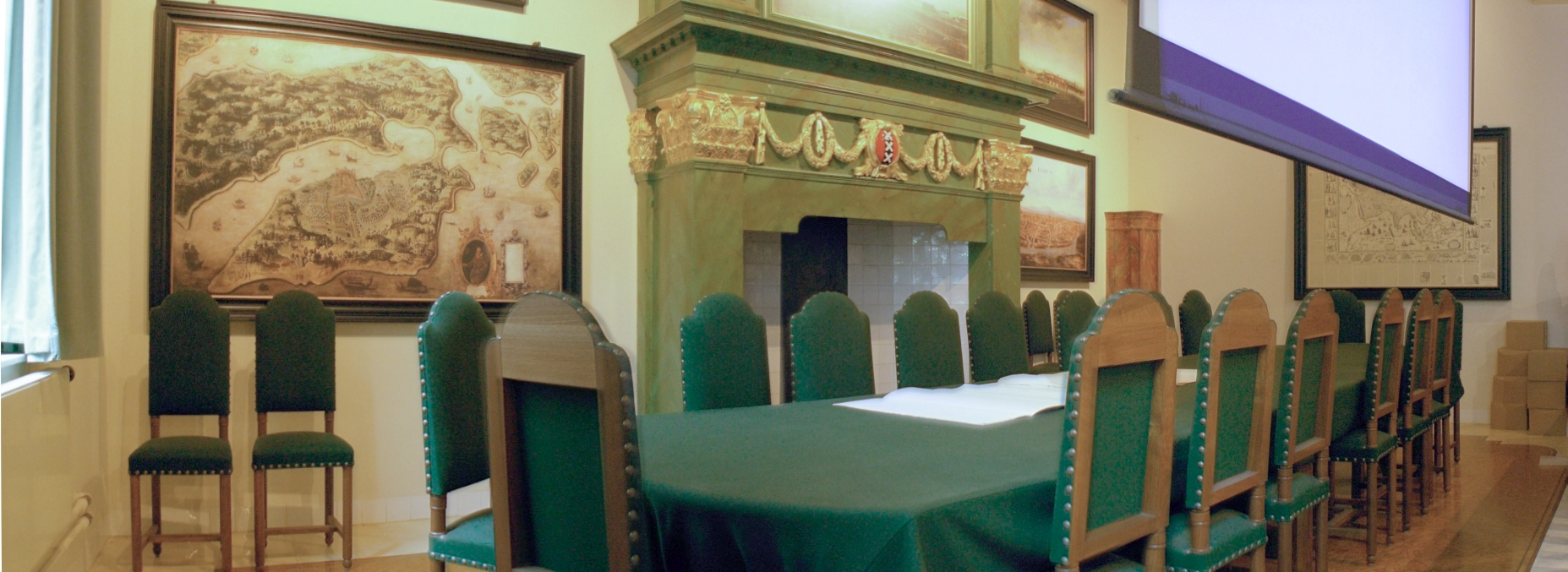
The restored meeting room of the Heeren XVII (the Lords Seventeen), the regents of the Dutch East India Company

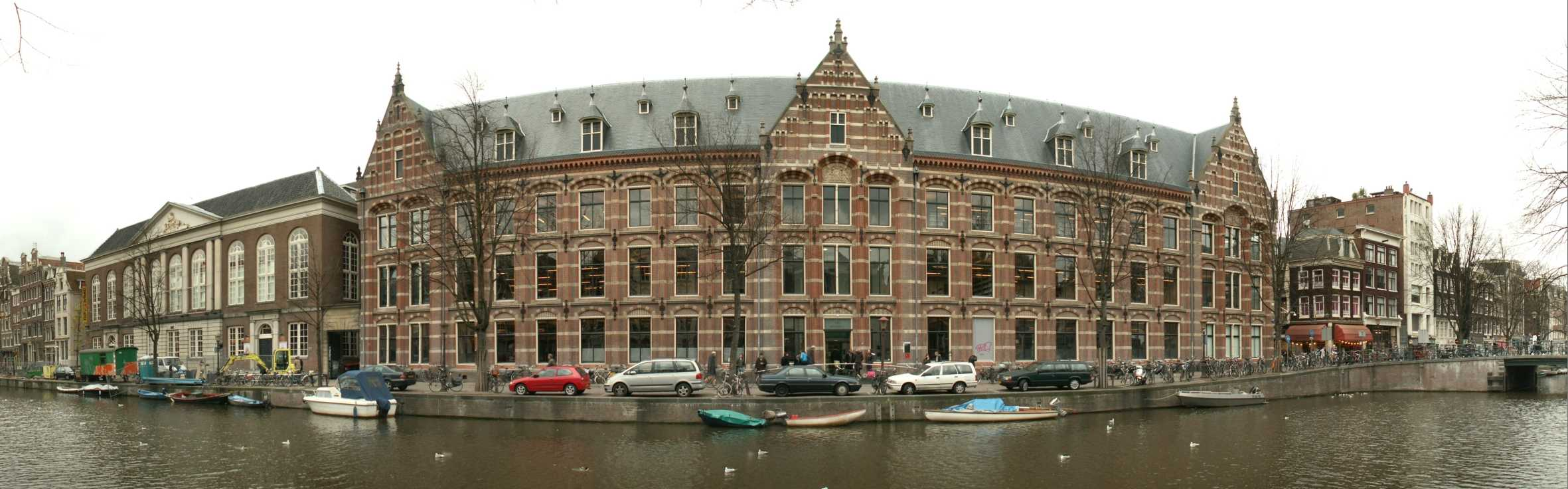
Eastern wing along Kloveniersburgwal canal added in 1891 to replace the Bushuis

The Oost-Indisch Huis (Dutch for "East India House") is an early 17th-century building in the centre of Amsterdam. It was the headquarters of the Amsterdam chamber of the Dutch East India Company (Vereenigde Oostindische Compagnie or VOC). It is a listed Dutch national heritage site (rijksmonument).

== History ==
In 1603, the Amsterdam chamber of the East India Company began using part of the Bushuis armory on the Kloveniersburgwal canal as a warehouse. Two years later, the East India Company took over the whole building. However, the company still lacked meeting and office space, so a new building was constructed directly adjacent to the Bushuis. This building, completed in 1606, was called the Oost-Indisch Huis ("East India House") and was the first building especially built for the East India Company. In 1663-64, the western wing was extended. In addition, a northern wing was added, so that the building now also bordered the street Oude Hoogstraat. The last major extension was added between 1658 and 1661. A gate with Tuscan-style pilasters and a small tunnel lead to an inner courtyard with elegant facades in Amsterdam Renaissance style, a style closely identified with the architect Hendrick de Keyser, who was most likely responsible for designing the building.

The Oost-Indisch Huis was the first building especially built for the East India Company. It was multifunctional, serving simultaneously as a warehouse, administrative center, office and auction room. The building served as the headquarters of the Amsterdam chamber (Kamer) of the East India Company. The 20 regents of the Amsterdam chamber met here. In addition, the majority of meetings of the Heeren XVII (the Lords Seventeen), the regents of the East India Company, were also held at the Oost-Indisch Huis. Shipcrews were recruited here, and the archives and map collection of the East India Company were also kept here.

After the East India Company was dissolved in 1798, the building served until 1808 as the seat of the colonial government of the Batavian Republic. In 1891, the adjacent Bushuis was demolished and a new eastern wing, designed by Cornelis Peters, was added along the inner courtyard.

In 1976 the building underwent restoration. During this restoration, the grand meeting room was also reconstructed. The building has been declared a national monument (rijksmonument). The building is now in use by the University of Amsterdam.

== Related buildings ==
The East India Company chambres in Rotterdam, Delft, Enkhuizen and Hoorn also had an Oost-Indisch Huis as their headquarters. The building in Rotterdam was destroyed during the Rotterdam Blitz in 1940; however, the ones in Delft and Hoorn are still in existence.

Amsterdam also has a West-Indisch Huis, which served as headquarters of the Dutch West India Company, and which has also been declared a Dutch national monument.

== Sources ==
- Amsterdam Bureau Monumenten & Archeologie: Oost-Indisch Huis (Dutch)
- Amsterdam Monumenten - Oost-Indisch Huis (Dutch)
- Gemeente Amsterdam: VOC, 400 jaar handelstraditie (Dutch)
- VOC Kenniscentrum (Dutch)
- Cultuurwijzer: Oost-Indische Huizen in Nederland (Dutch)
