= Hendrick de Keyser =

Dutch sculptor, merchant in Belgium bluestone and architect

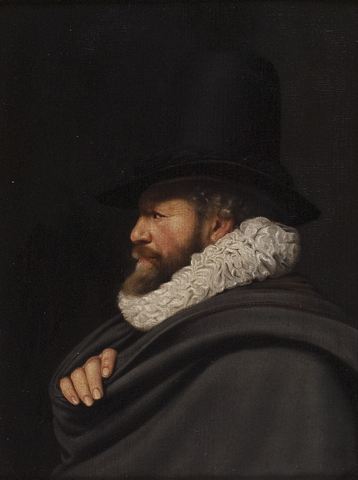
- Portrait of Hendrick de Keyser (1621/25) by Thomas de Keyser
- Born: 15 May 1565; Utrecht, The Netherlands
- Died: 15 May 1621 (aged 56)
- Resting place: Zuiderkerk, The Netherlands
- Occupation: Sculptor
- Children: Pieter de Keyser, Thomas de Keyser and Willem de Keyser

Hendrick de Keyser (15 May 1565 – 15 May 1621) was a Dutch sculptor, merchant in Belgium bluestone, and architect who was instrumental in establishing a late Renaissance form of Mannerism changing into Baroque. Most of his works appeared in Amsterdam, some elsewhere in the Dutch Colonies. He was the father of Pieter, Thomas de Keyser and Willem, and the uncle of Huybert de Keyser, who became his apprentices and all involved in building, decoration and architecture.

== Biography and works ==
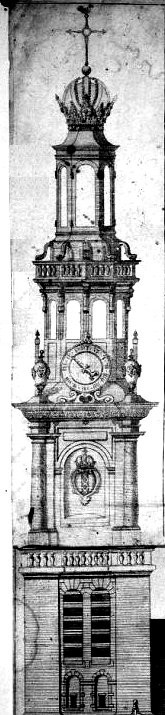
Part from Westertoren, gravure in Architectura Moderna (1631) by Salomon de Bray

Hendrick de Keyser was born in Utrecht, and the son of a cabinetmaker. He grew up in an expropriated monastery, the Catalijne Convent. As a young man he was apprenticed to the engineer Cornelis Bloemaert (the elder). In 1591 he followed Bloemaert to Amsterdam and married Beyken van Wildre from Antwerp. Soon he set to work as an independent artist. In 1595 he was appointed city stonemason and sculptor. In 1603 the working on the Zuiderkerk stopped but they resumed construction in 1606, when they agreed with the church board. Meanwhile, he visited London, together with Cornelis Danckerts de Ry to study the Royal Exchange, London. There he contracted Nicholas Stone? Perhaps they met with Inigo Jones, but he does not appear to have turned seriously to architecture until after his Italian tour of 1614.

In 1608 De Keyser sold petit Granit which was used for the weigh house in Hoorn; he also designed the dormers on the rooftop. From 1609 De Keyser lived and worked at Groenburgwal, near Amstel. De Keyser was visited by Hans van Steenwinckel the Younger and his brother Lorenz from Denmark who may have asked him for advice or training. Quite a few of his siblings lived in the area. His brothers Jacob who was a cabinetmaker, and Aert a timber merchant, and Huybert his nephew all lived near Jodenbreestraat in a sidestreet. (In 1639 the heirs sold the house to the sephardic community.) De Keyser was friendly with the painter Cornelis Ketel, whom he visited when Ketel made his will; both were Arminian or Remonstrant. De Keyser's relations with Ketel are illustrated by the portraits Ketel painted of the architect.

Hendrick is famous for a number of important buildings, gates and towers which belong to the core of Dutch historic sites. Today the Zuiderkerk (1603/6-1611) and accompanying tower (1614), the City Hall (Delft) (1618-1620), the Westerkerk (1620-1631) are among the historic buildings which provide important insights into De Keyser's work. He cooperated with Hendrick Jacobsz. Staets en Cornelis Danckertsz. His Commodity Exchange of 1608-1613 was pulled down in the 19th century. The East India House in Amsterdam was most likely also designed by him; later extensions were done by his sons. In the year 1616 he renovated the Bank van Lening. The renovation of the Waag took place in 1617 according to his design; in 1619 the Munttoren was prepared for adding a clock.

Hendrick de Keyser's projects in Amsterdam during the early decades of the 17th century helped establish a late Mannerist style referred to as "Amsterdam Renaissance". He could be influenced by Paul Vredeman de Vries. The Amsterdam Renaissance style deviates in many respects from sixteenth-century Italian Renaissance architecture. Classical elements such as pilasters, cornices and pediments were used on a large scale, but mainly as decorative elements. De Keyser never slavishly followed the tenets of classical architecture as laid down in the Italian treatises by Serlio and Palladio. His version came to full bloom at the end of the second decade of the 17th century, and set the stage for the later Dutch classical phase of Jacob van Campen and Pieter Post.

Apart from pursuing a career as an architect, De Keyser remained active as a sculptor. He designed the tomb of William the Silent for the Nieuwe Kerk (Delft) (1614-1623). However, De Keyser did not live to see the finished product. His son Pieter, who inherited his tools and designs, completed his work. In 1631 Salomon de Bray included the architect's most important sketches, based on mathematical regularity, in his book ’Architectura Moderna’.

De Keyser's career was not limited to Amsterdam, and his international contacts helped him to keep in touch with the mainstream of European architecture. In 1607 the Amsterdam city magistrates sent him to England; it is believed he worked with Inigo Jones? When De Keyser and Danckerts returned to Amsterdam Nicholas Stone, joined them. For several years Stone worked with De Keyser and even became his son-in-law in 1613. His grandson Henry Stone (painter) studied with Thomas de Keyser. De Keyser died on his birthday and was buried in the nearby Zuiderkerk.

== List of works ==
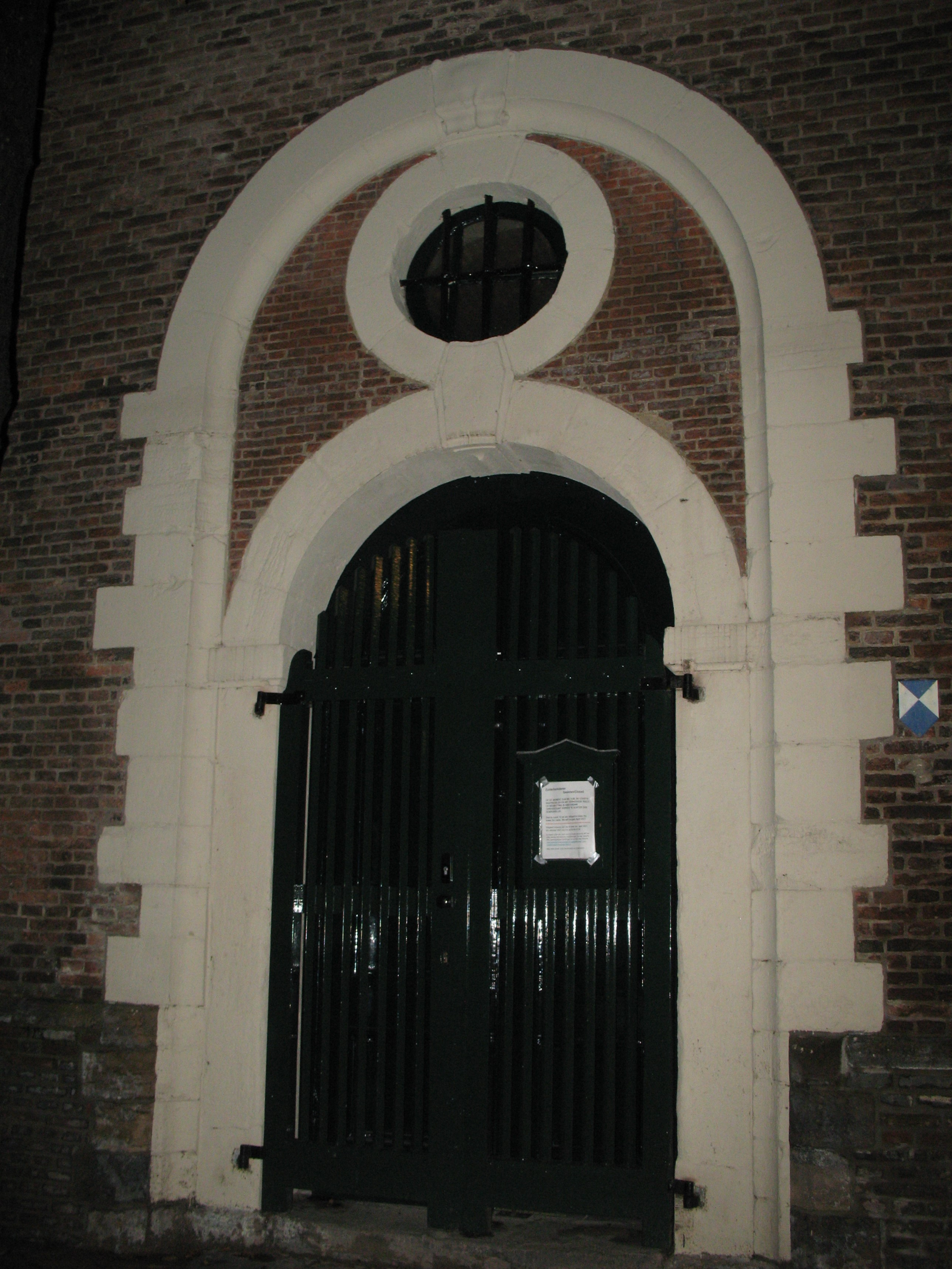
Playful entrance of tower Zuiderkerk (1614) by Hendrick de Keyser

- 1603: Rasphuispoortje, Amsterdam. The decoration on the top is not by HdK and dates from 1663.
- 1606: Oost-Indisch Huis, Amsterdam. The attribution to HdK is uncertain.
- 1606: Montelbaanstoren, Amsterdam.
- 1606-1611: Zuiderkerk, Amsterdam.
- 1608-1613: Beurs van Hendrick de Keyser, Rokin, Amsterdam (enlarged around 1660, demolished in 1835).
- 1614-1623: Praalgraf Willem van Oranje, Delft (completed by Pieter de Keyser).
- 1615-1618: Haarlemmerpoort, Amsterdam; built with petit Granit, demolished in 1838.
- 1618-1620: Stadhuis, Delft.
- 1620-1623: Noorderkerk, Amsterdam, together with city mason Cornelis Danckertsz.
- 1620-1631: Westerkerk, Amsterdam, (completed by Pieter de Keyser).
- 1622: Statue of Erasmus, Rotterdam (completed by Pieter de Keyser).

Works attributed to Hendrick de Keyser:

- Jan Roodenpoortstoren, Amsterdam. 1616, pulled down 1829.
- Haringpakkerstoren, Amsterdam. 1607, pulled down 1829.
- Huis Bartolotti, Herengracht 170–172, Amsterdam. Ca. 1617. Attribution to HdK is uncertain.
- Huis met de Hoofden, Keizersgracht 123, Amsterdam. Designed by Huybert or Pieter de Keyser (1622).

== Gallery ==
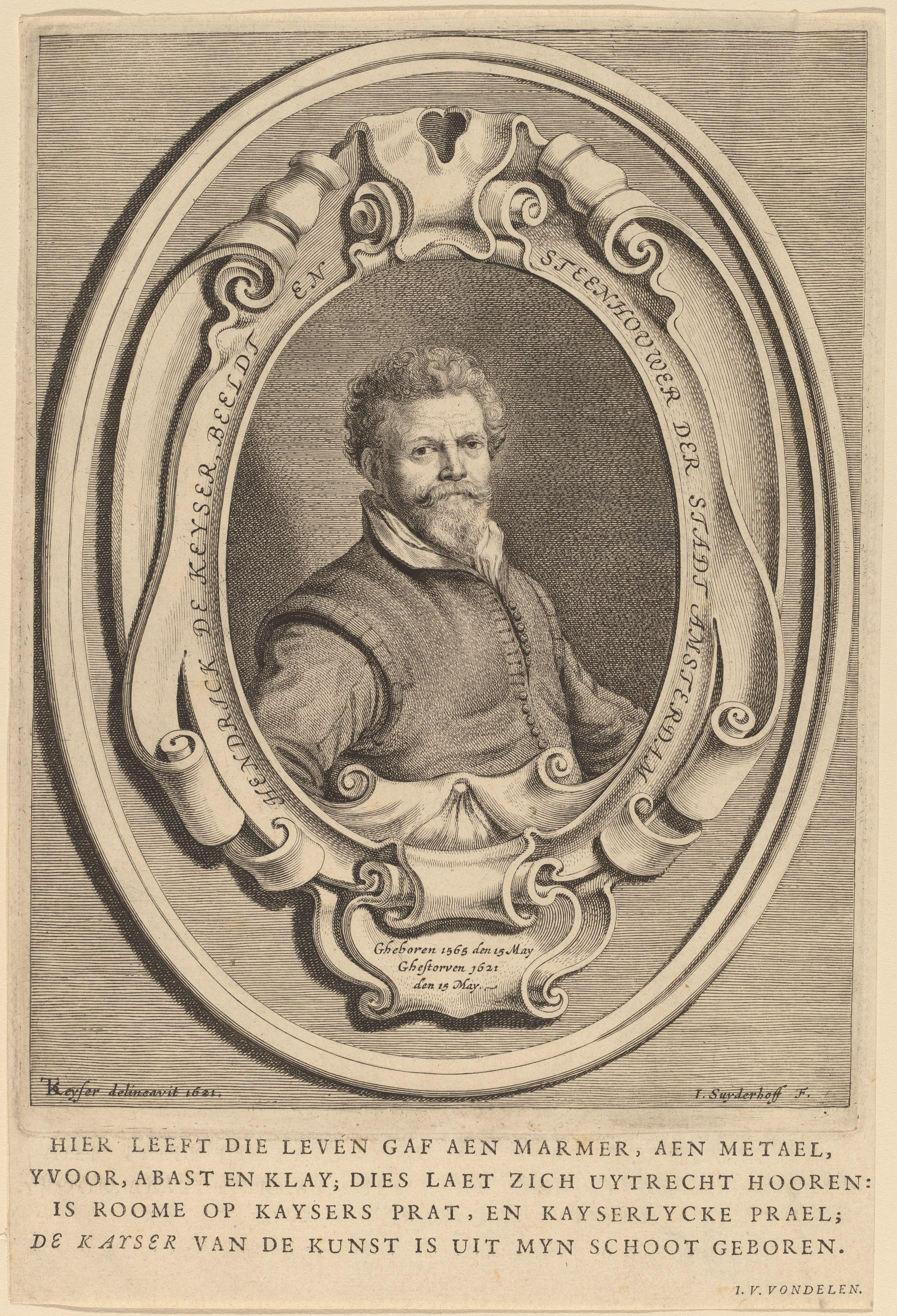
Hendrick de Keyser by Jonas Suyderhoff after Thomas de Keyser

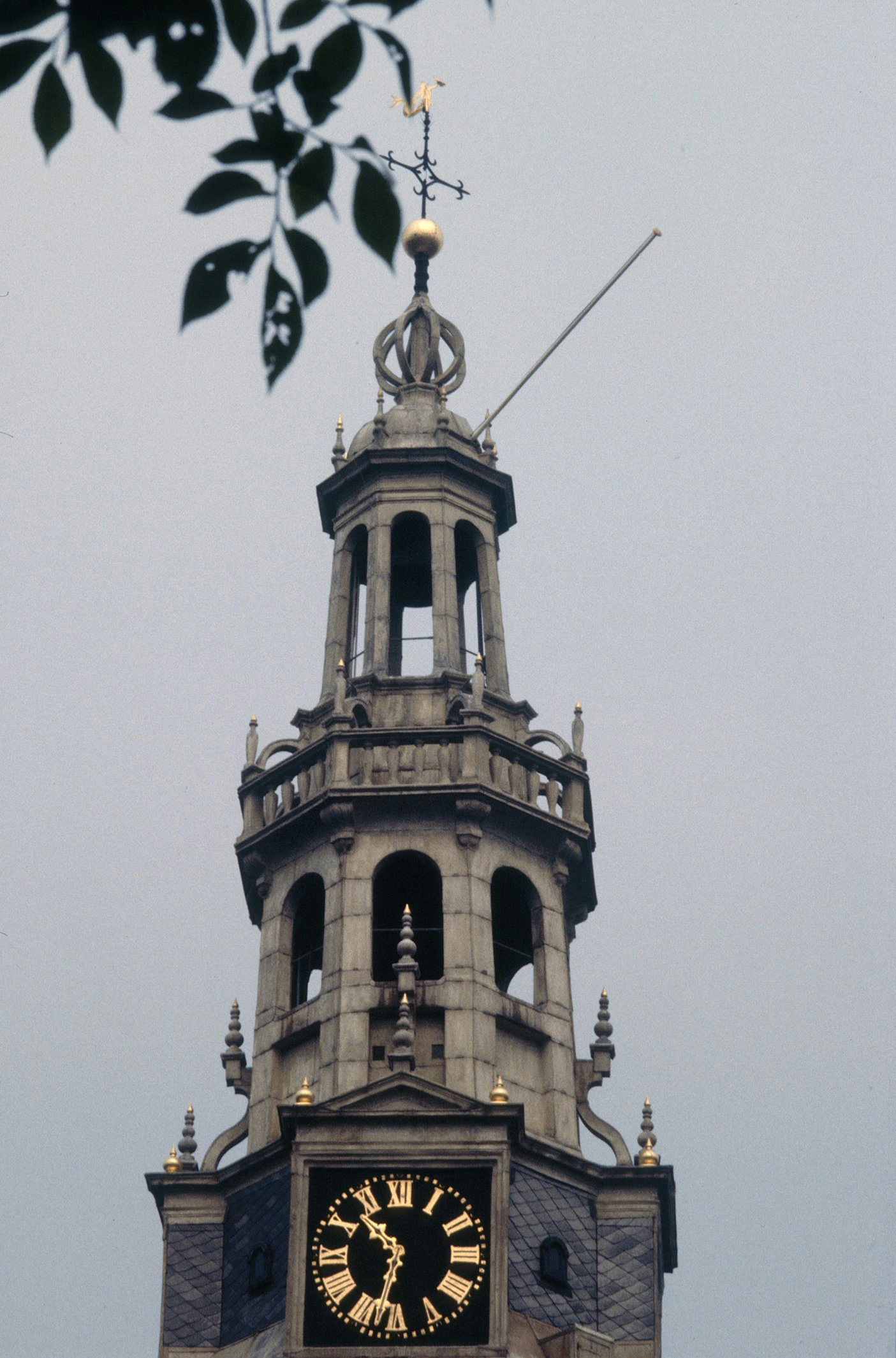
Top of the Montelbaanstoren (1606)

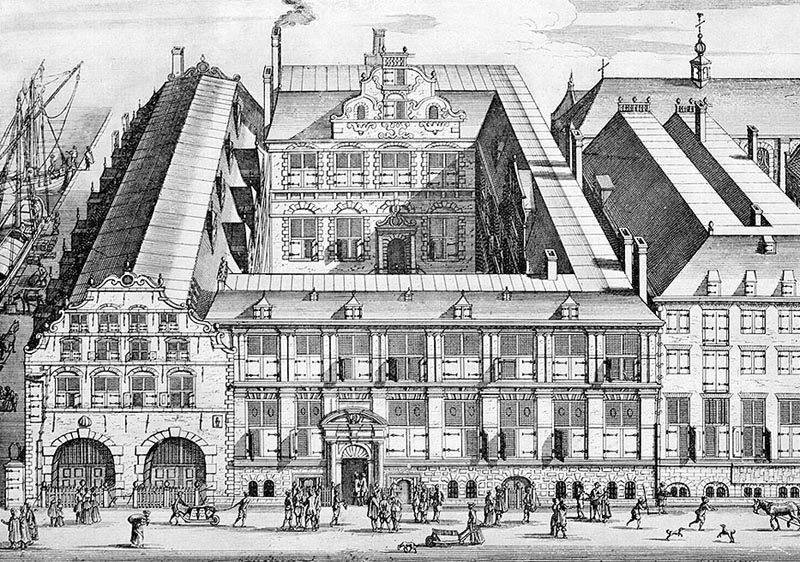
Oost-Indisch Huis in the court yard is attributed to HdK (1606)

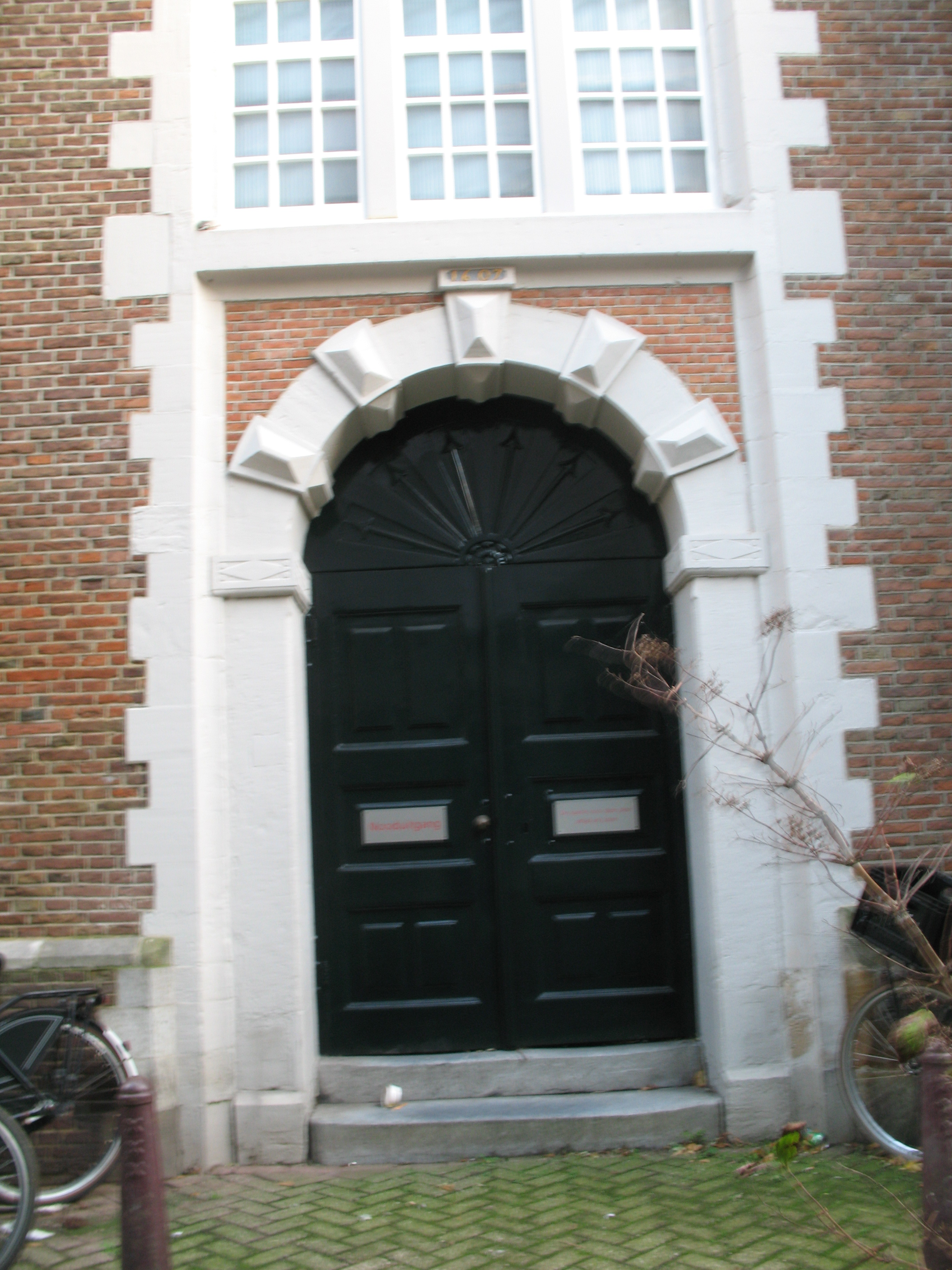
Entrance Zuiderkerk in Zanddwarsstraat (1607) by HdK

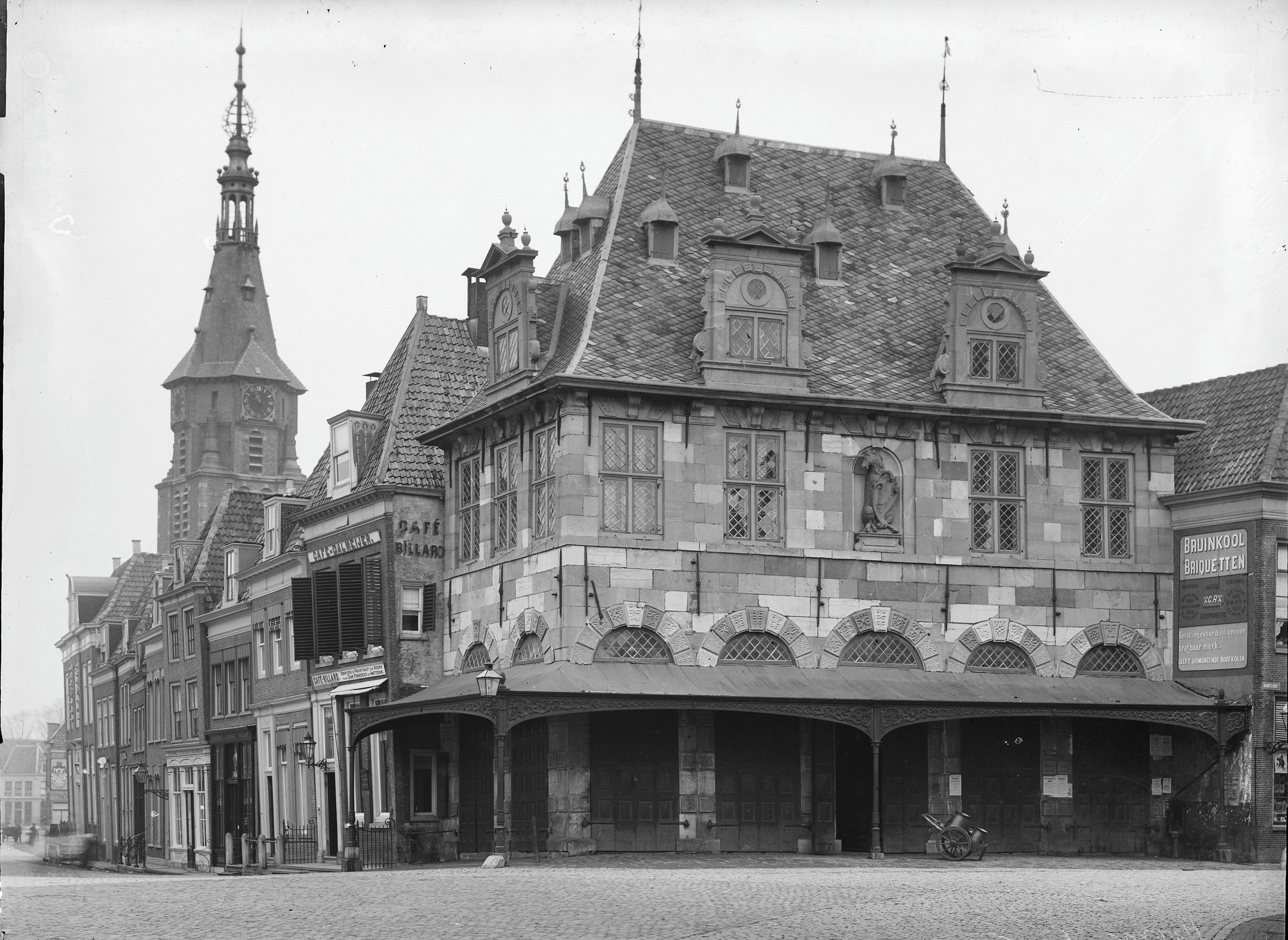
Weigh house in Hoorn built with Belgian Fossil (1609)

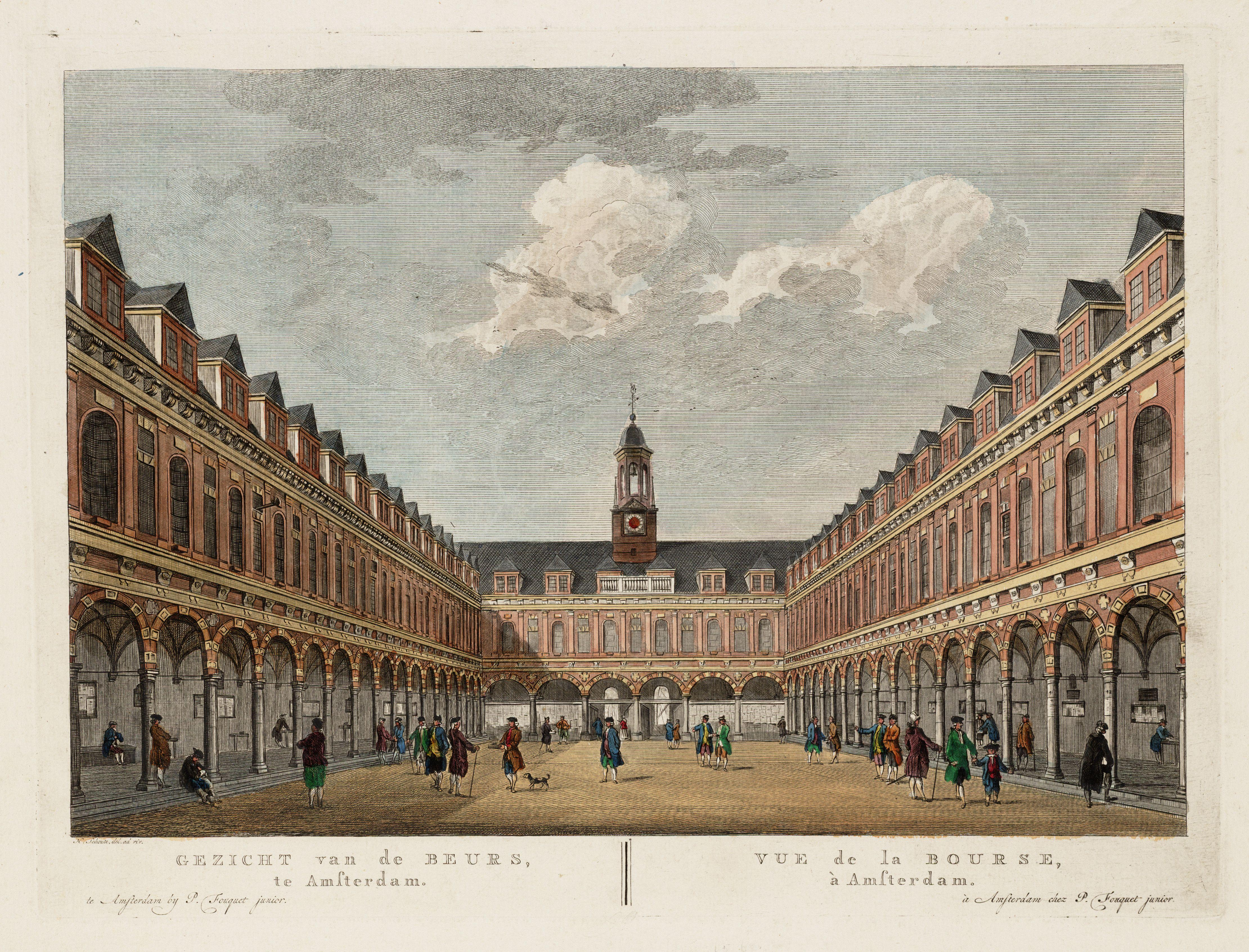
Exchange by Hendrick de Keyser (1613)

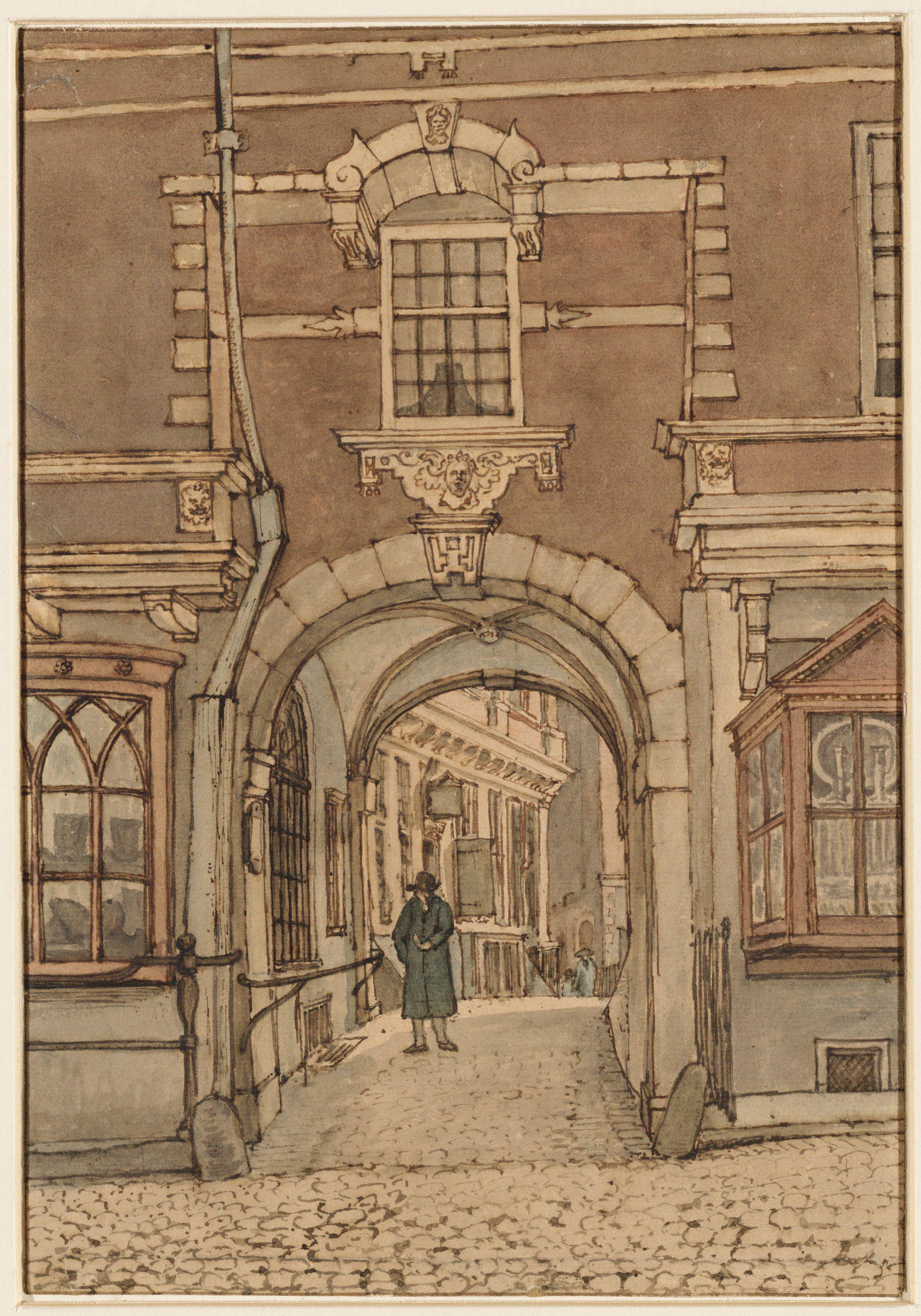
Beurspoortje by HdK, drawing by Gerrit Lamberts

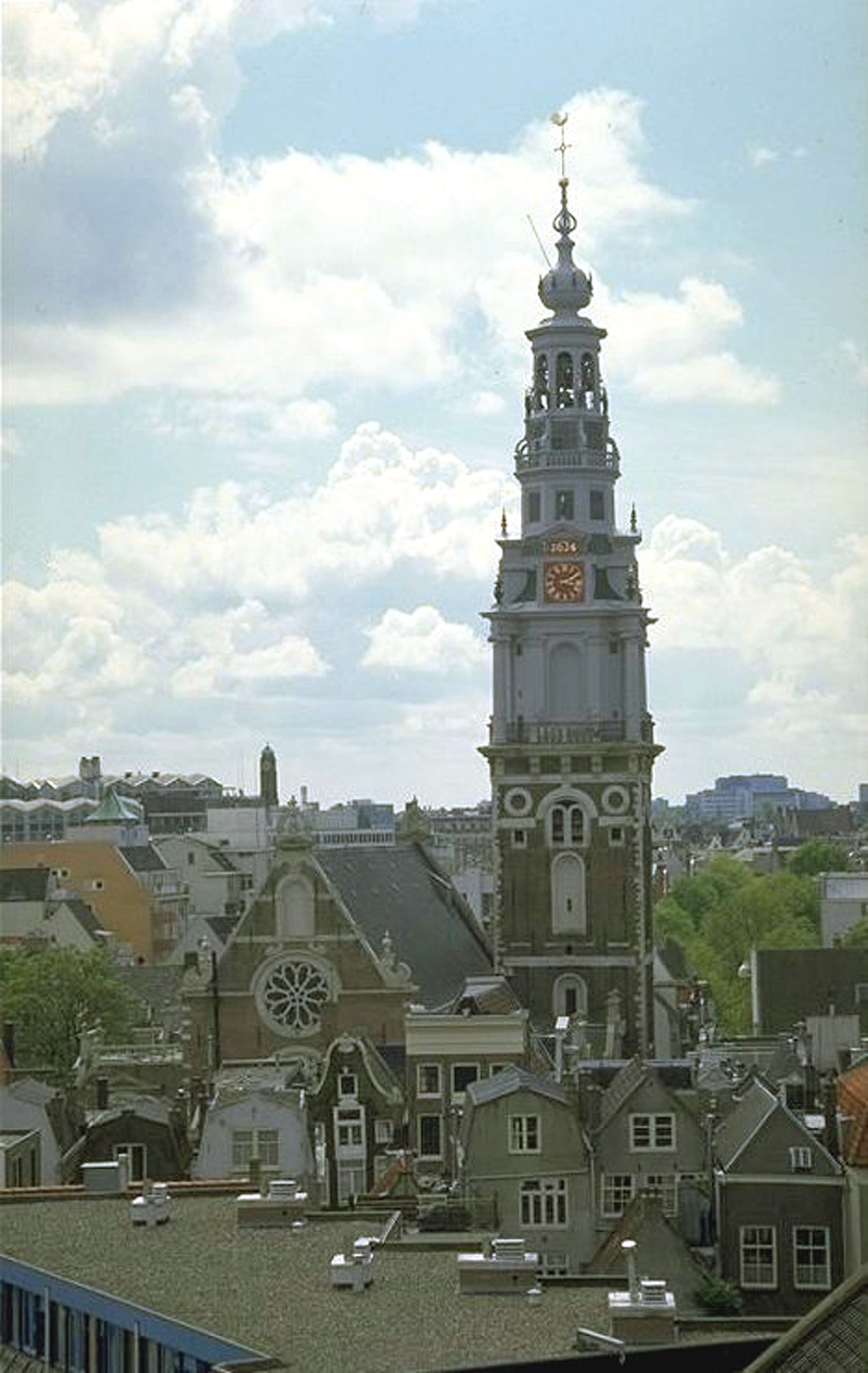
Zuiderkerk (1614)

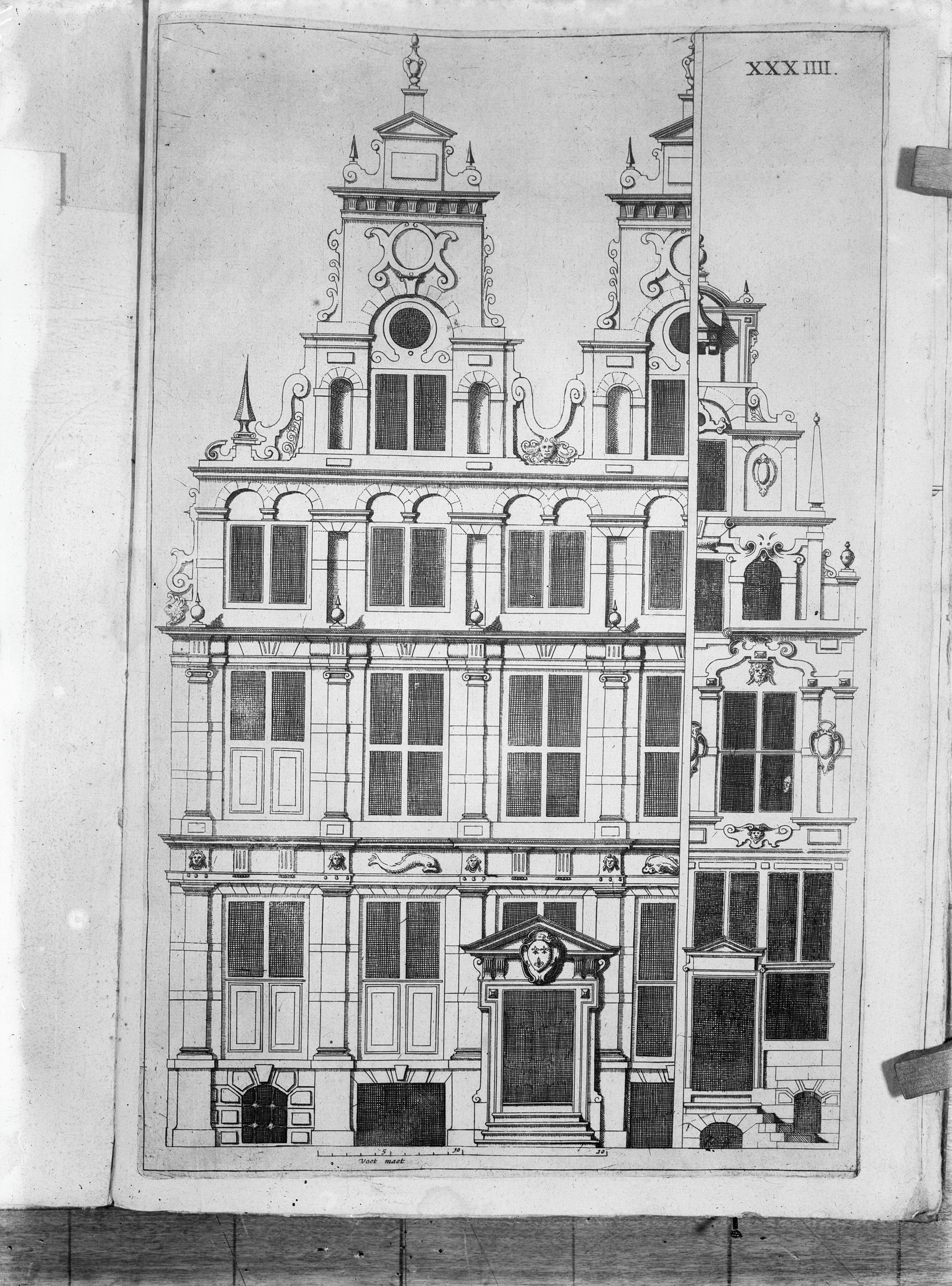
Singel 142 (left) and Oudezijds Voorburgwal 57, both designed by HdK (1615?)

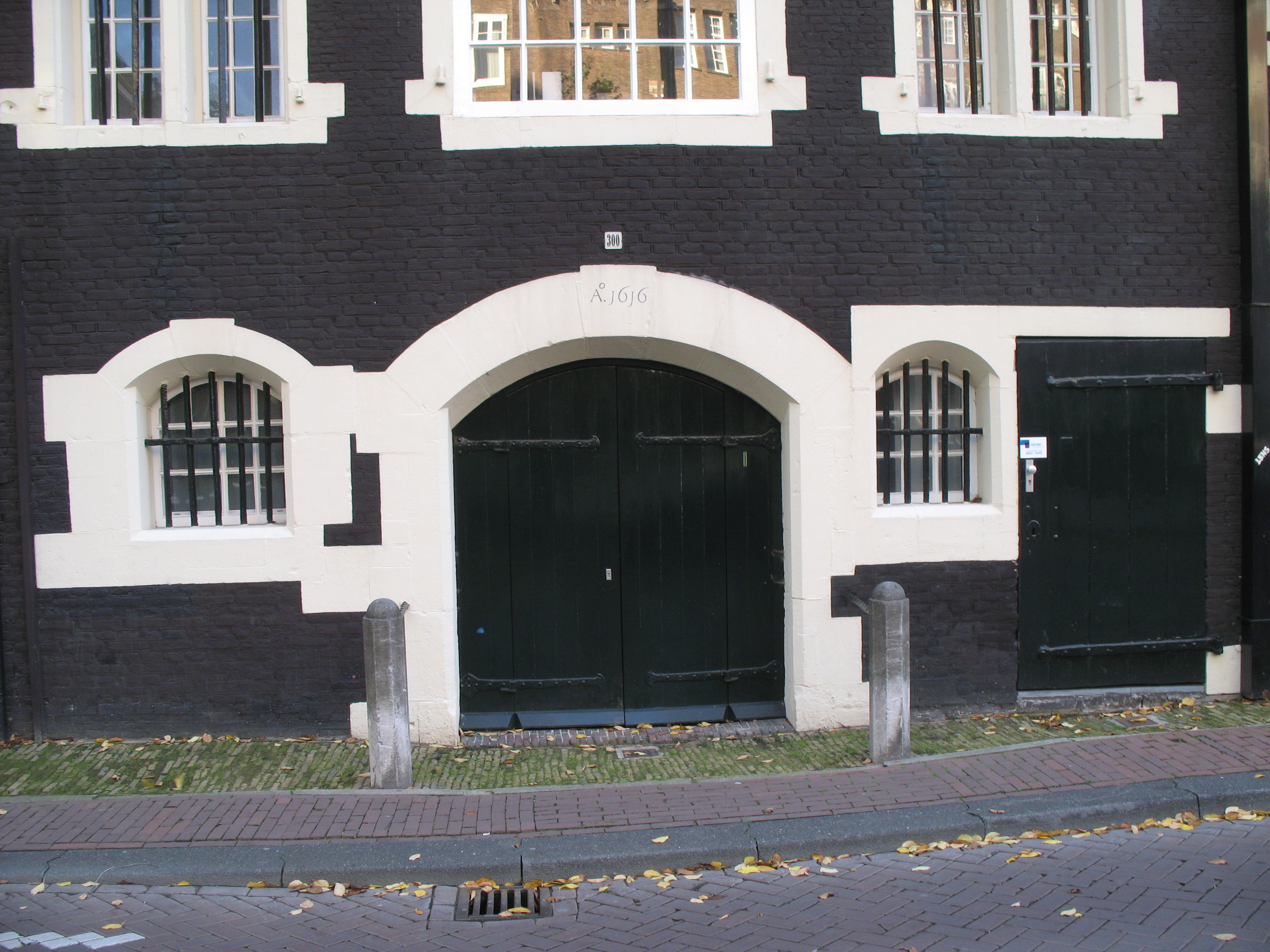
Playful entrance Bank van Lening (1616)

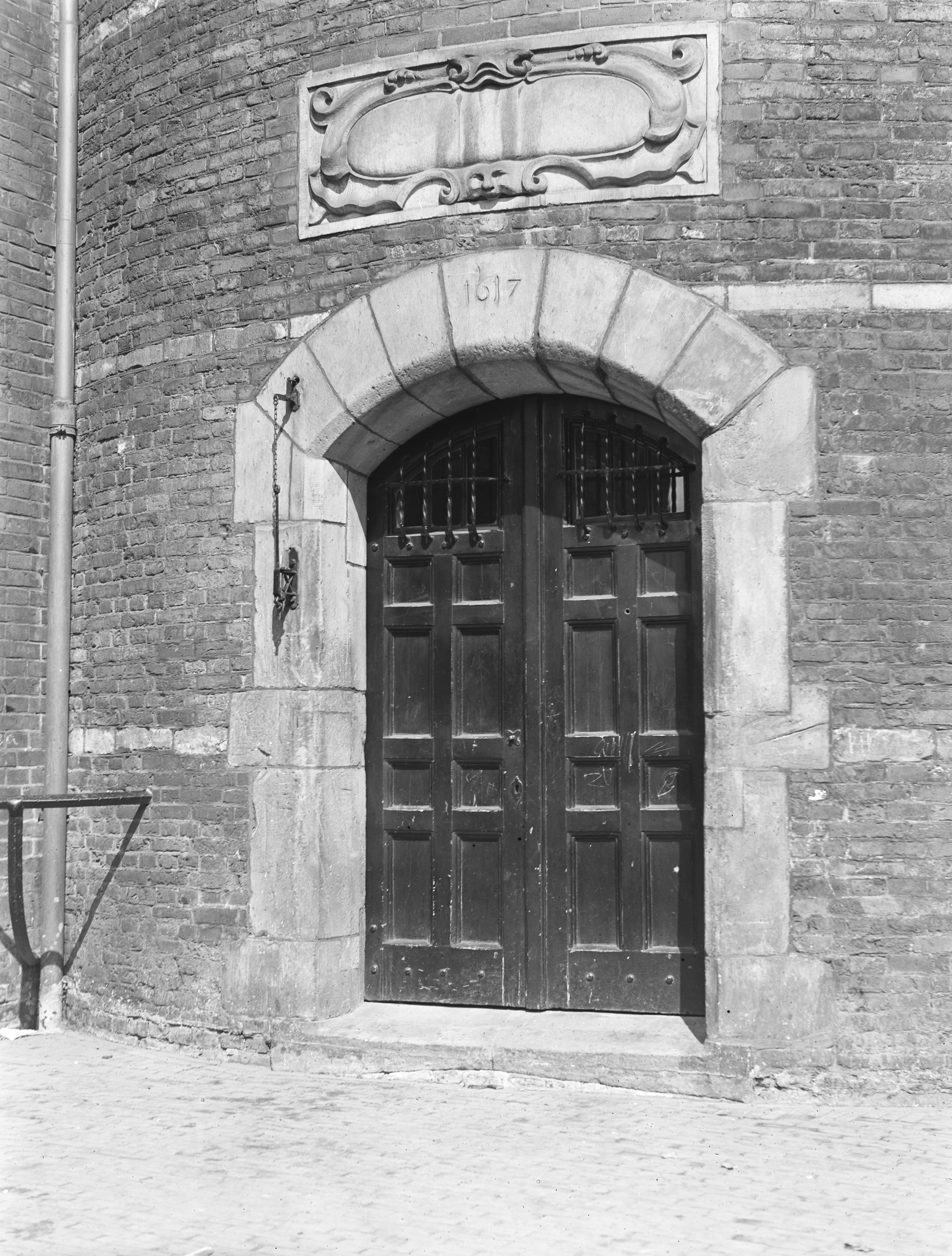
Entrance of the weigh house (1617)

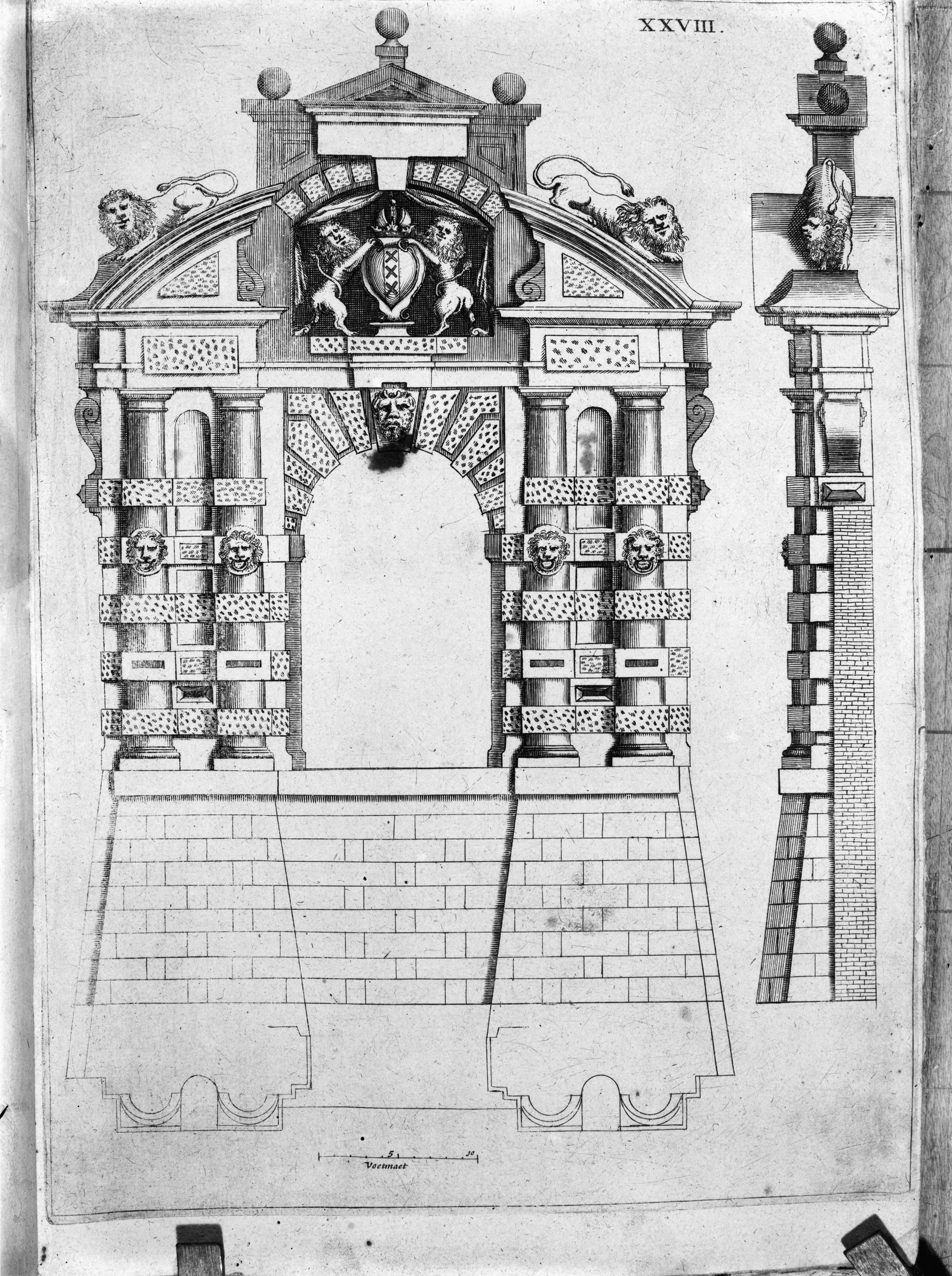
Design of Haarlemmerpoort

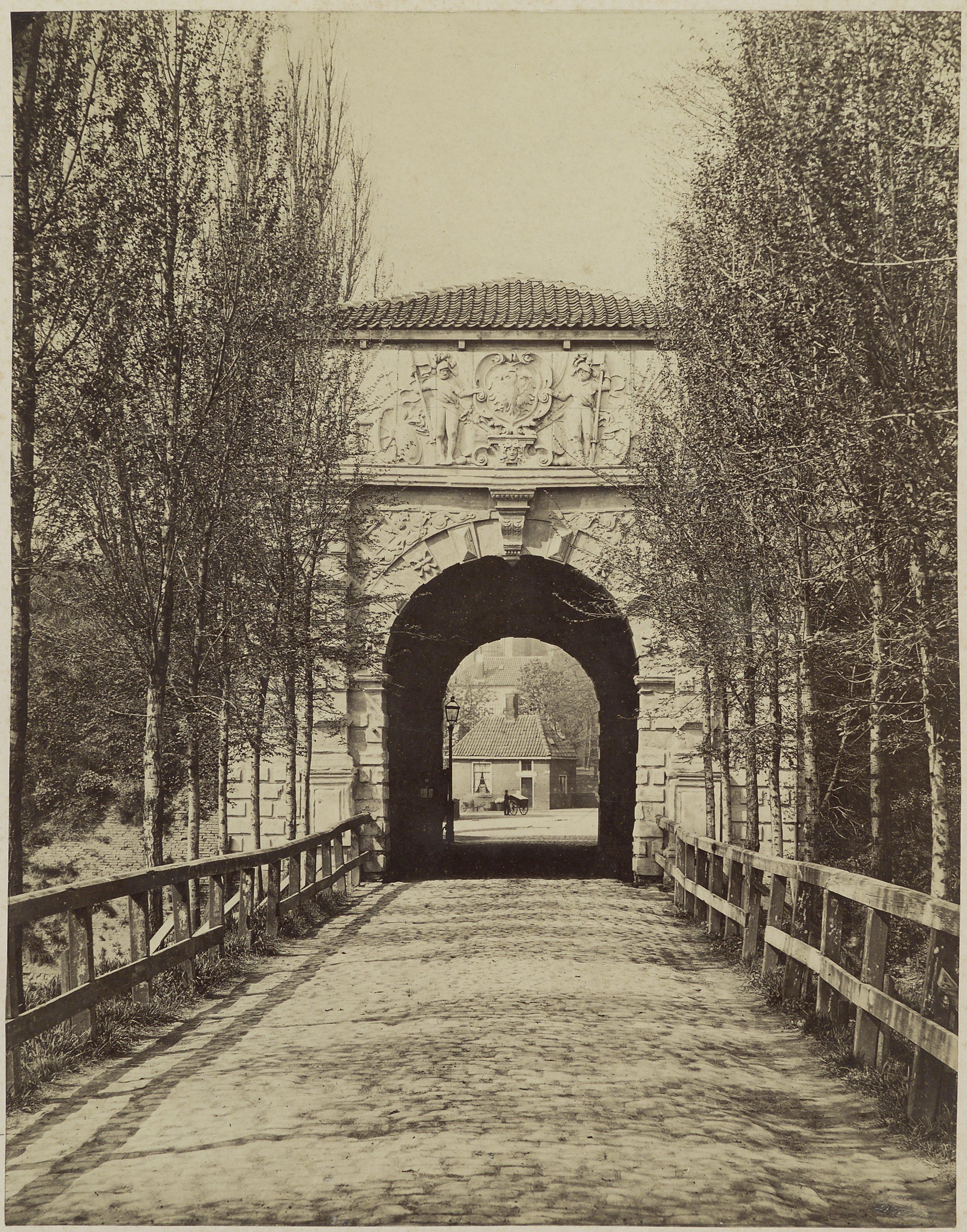
Bergpoort in Deventer (1619)

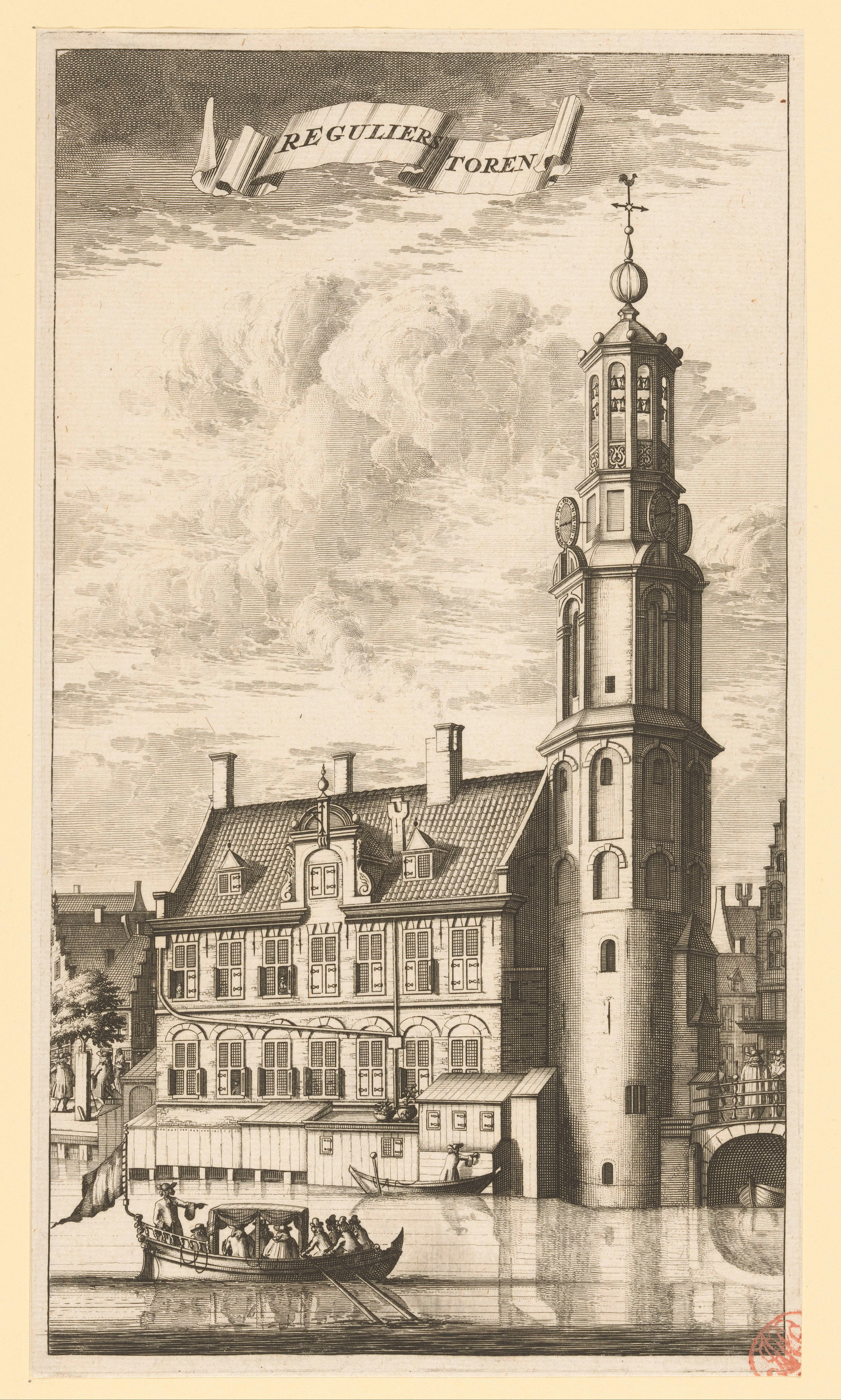
Munttoren (1619)

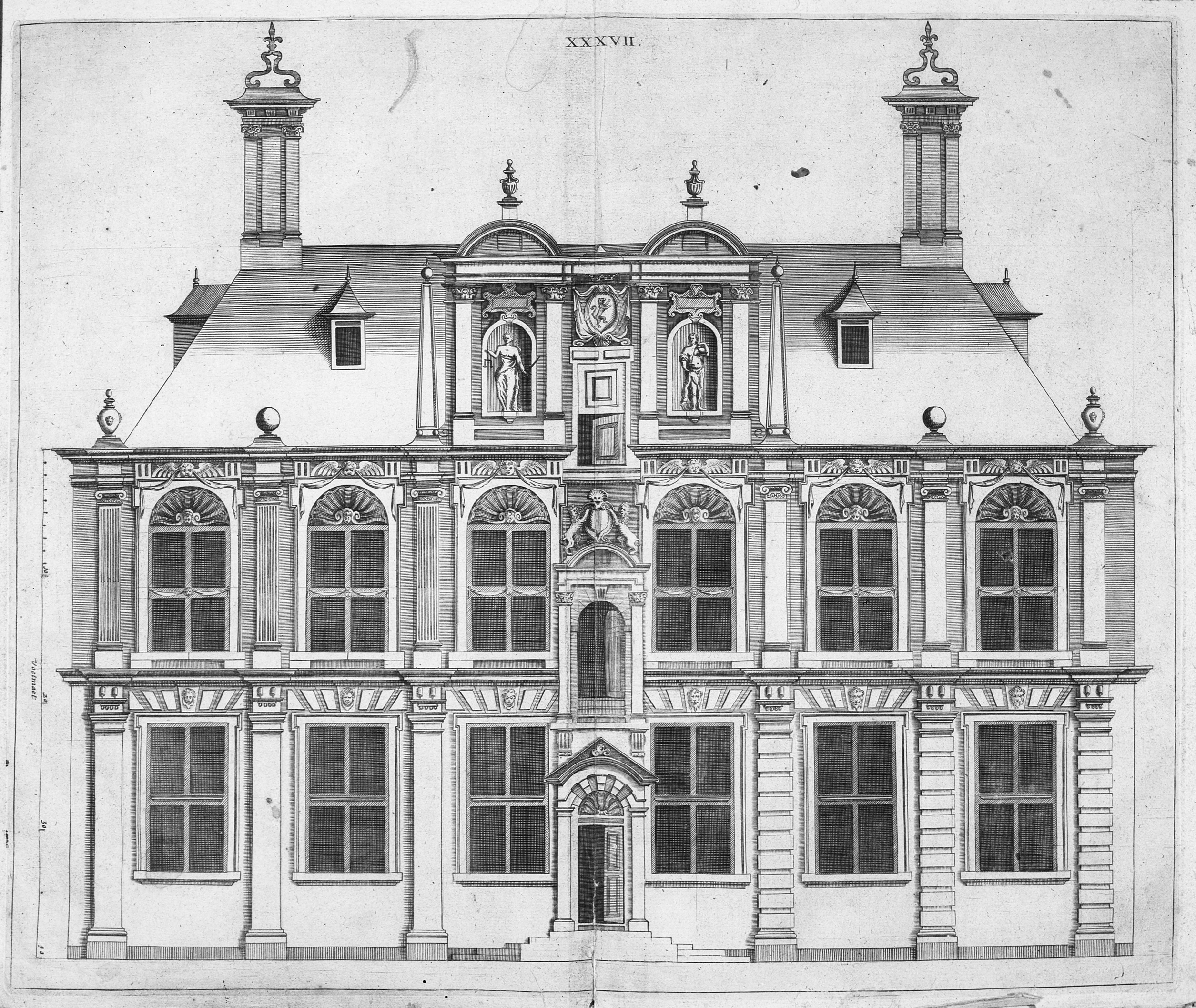
Design of the City hall in Delft

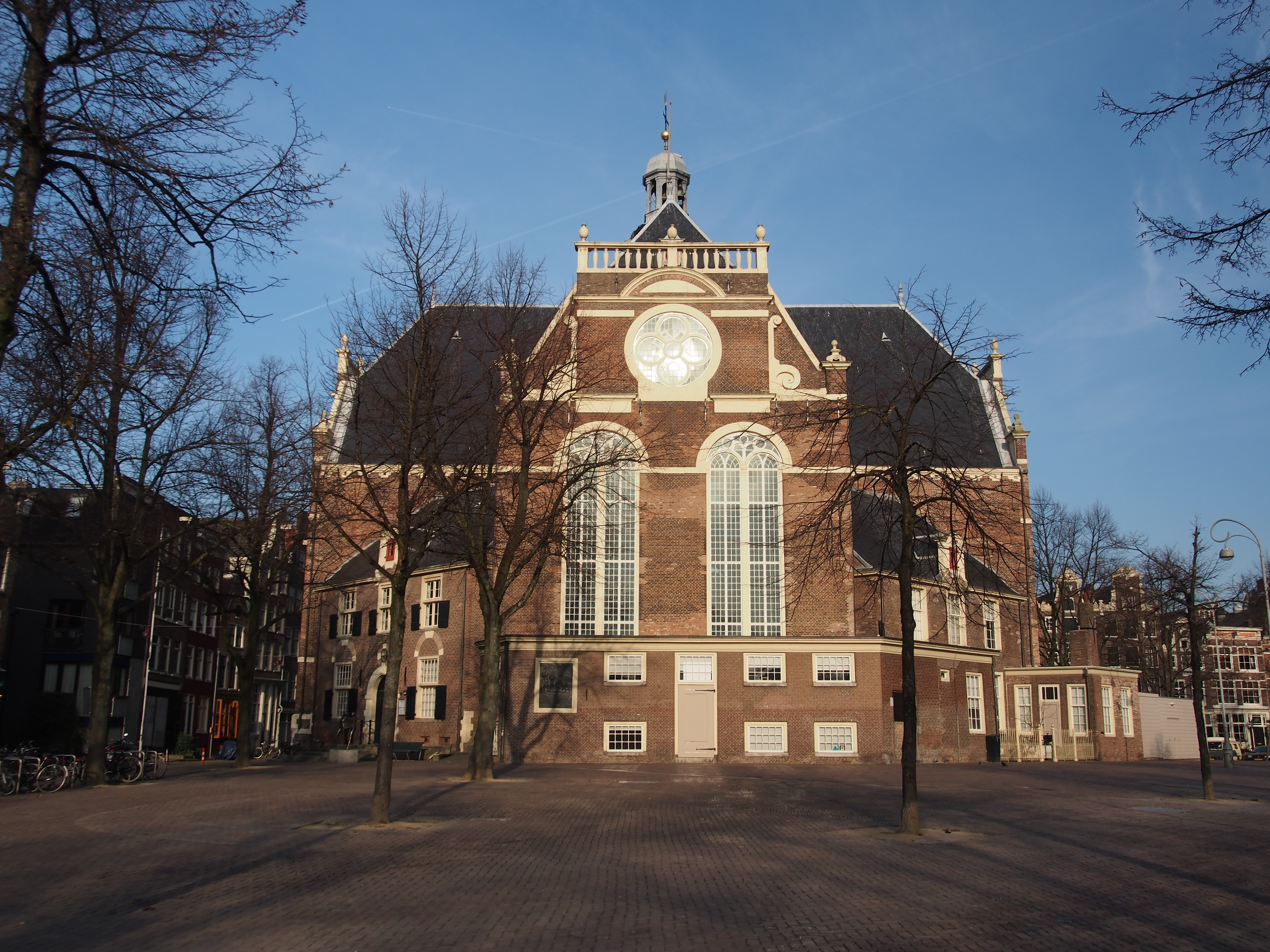
Noorderkerk

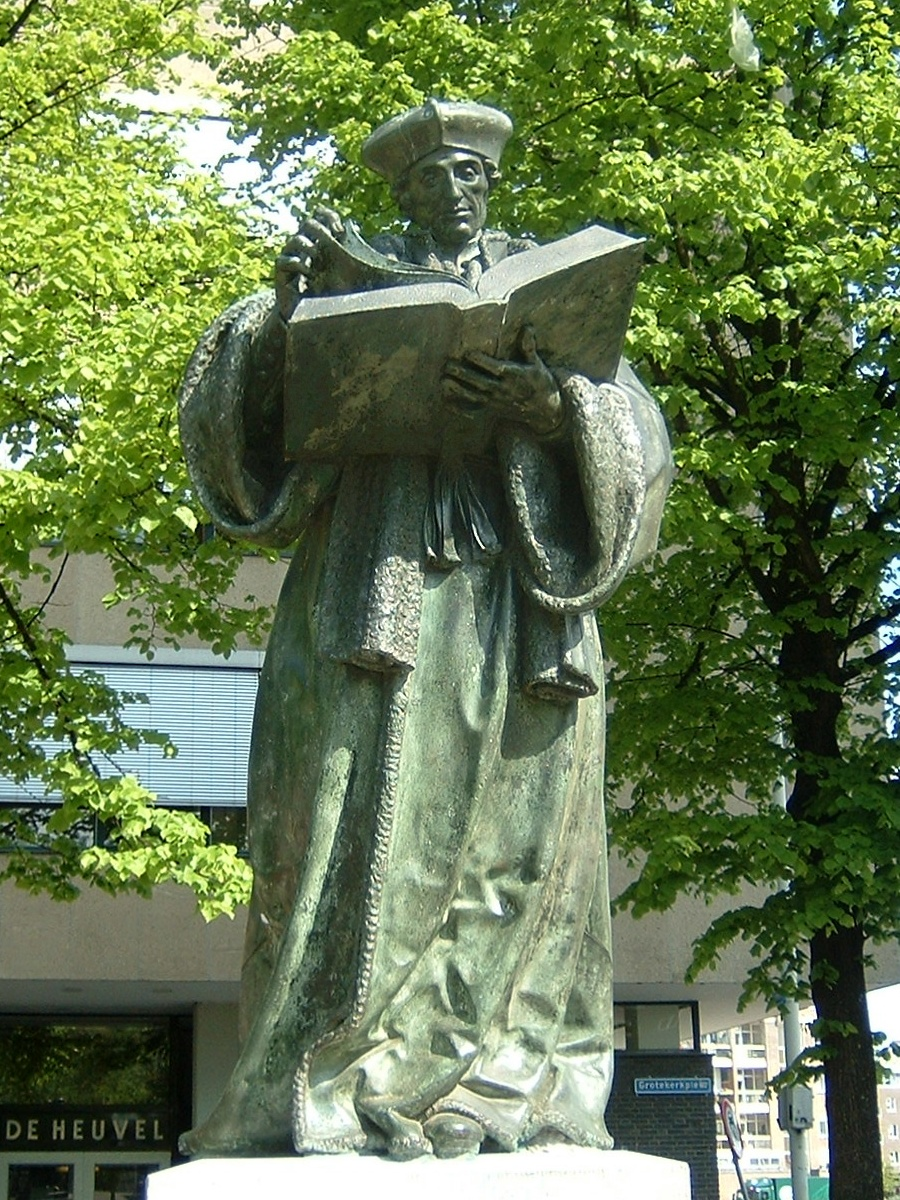
Statue of Erasmus in Rotterdam
