= Noorderkerk =

17th-century Protestant church in Amsterdam, The Netherlands .

Coordinates: 52°22′46″N 4°53′11″E

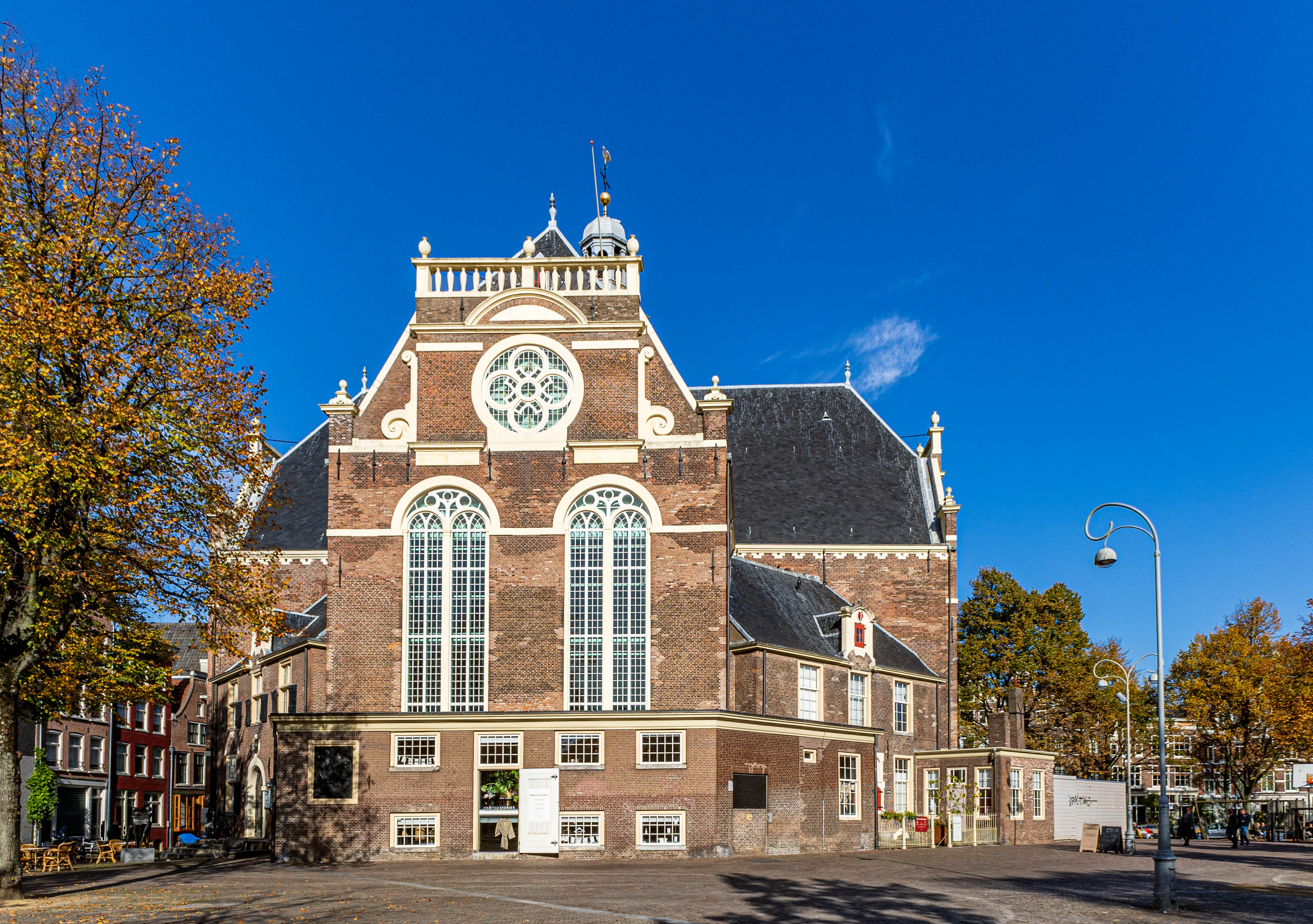
The Noorderkerk in Amsterdam

The Noorderkerk (Dutch for "northern church") is a 17th-century Protestant church in Amsterdam, The Netherlands. The Noorderkerk is located along Prinsengracht canal, on Noordermarkt square. The church is used for Dutch Reformed Church services and is also used regularly for classical music concerts.

The architect was Hendrick de Keyser, who also designed the Zuiderkerk and Westerkerk, among others. After de Keyser's death in 1621, his son Pieter de Keyser took over and oversaw the completion.

While the Zuiderkerk and Westerkerk have a more traditional basilica design, the Noorderkerk has a symmetrical, cross-shaped layout, reflecting the ideals of the Renaissance and protestantism. De Keyser's unique design combines an octagonal floor plan with a structure shaped like a Greek cross, with four arms of equal length. Annex buildings occupy each corner of the cross, and a small tower sits in the centre of the cross. Large Tuscan pillars dominate the church interior.

A number of other towns in the Netherlands also have a Noorderkerk church, including The Hague, Hoorn and Kampen.

== History ==
The church was built in the years 1620–1623 to serve the rapidly growing population of the new Jordaan neighbourhood. The Jordaan already had a church, the Westerkerk, but the city government decided that a second church should be built to serve the northern part of the neighbourhood. The Noorderkerk became the church for the common people, while the Westerkerk was used mainly by the middle and upper classes.

The church was restored in the period 1993–1998. The small tower was restored in 2003–2004 and the organ, built in 1849 by H. Knipscheer, was restored in 2005. The bell tower was built in 1621 by J. Meurs.

In 1941, organisers of the February Strike held illicit public meetings on Noordermarkt, the square around the church. This is commemorated by a plaque on the south face of the church.

The church gained rijksmonument (national monument) status in 1970.

== Gallery ==
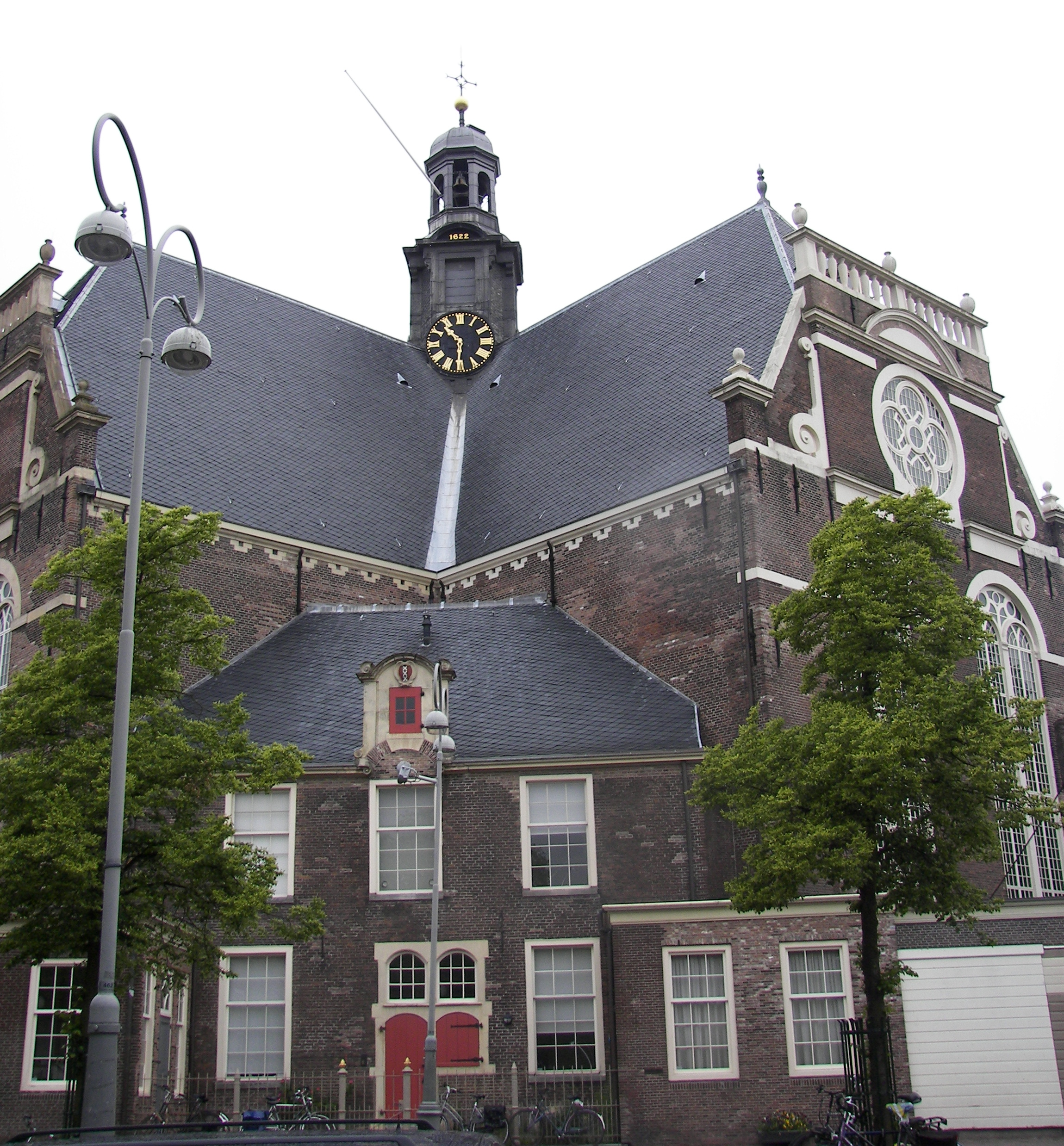

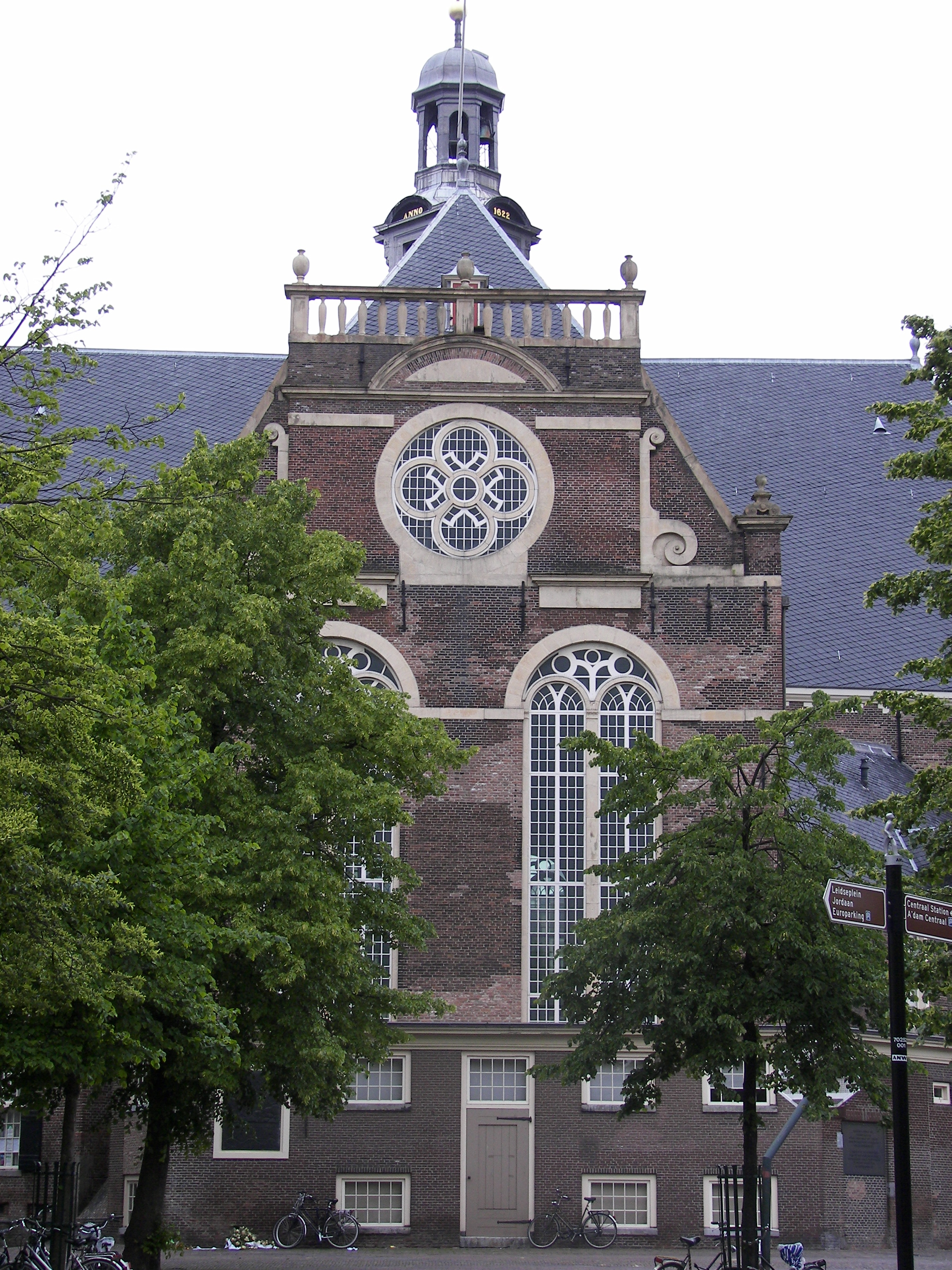

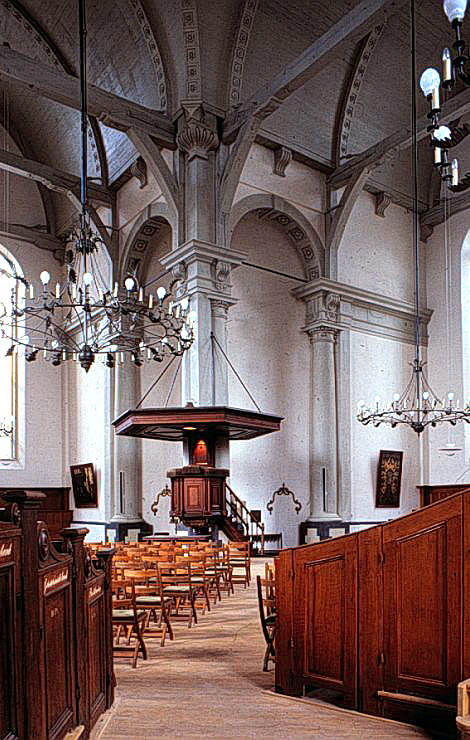
Interior

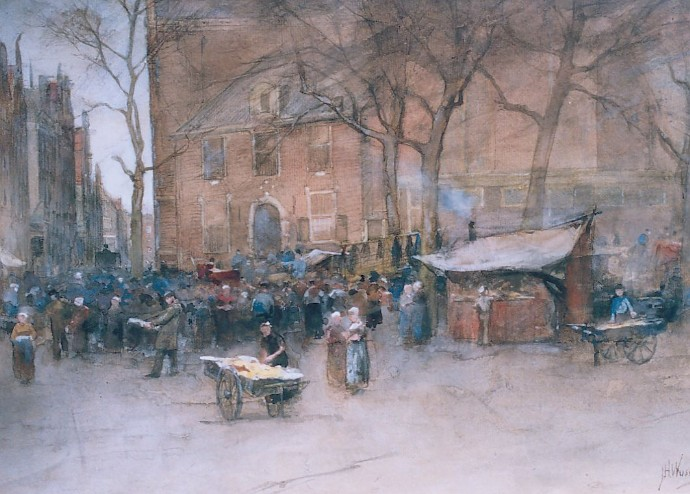
Jan Hillebrand Wijsmuller, Market at the North Church

== Burials ==
- Caspar Stoll
