= Pieter de Keyser =

Dutch architect and sculptor

- Born: c. 1595; Amsterdam, The Netherlands
- Died: 15 September 1675 (aged 79–80); Amsterdam, The Netherlands
- Occupation: Architect
- Spouses: Magdalena Geens (m.1623), Magdalena Jacobs (m.1625), Catherina Beghin or Bagjim (m.1639)
- Father: Hendrick de Keyser

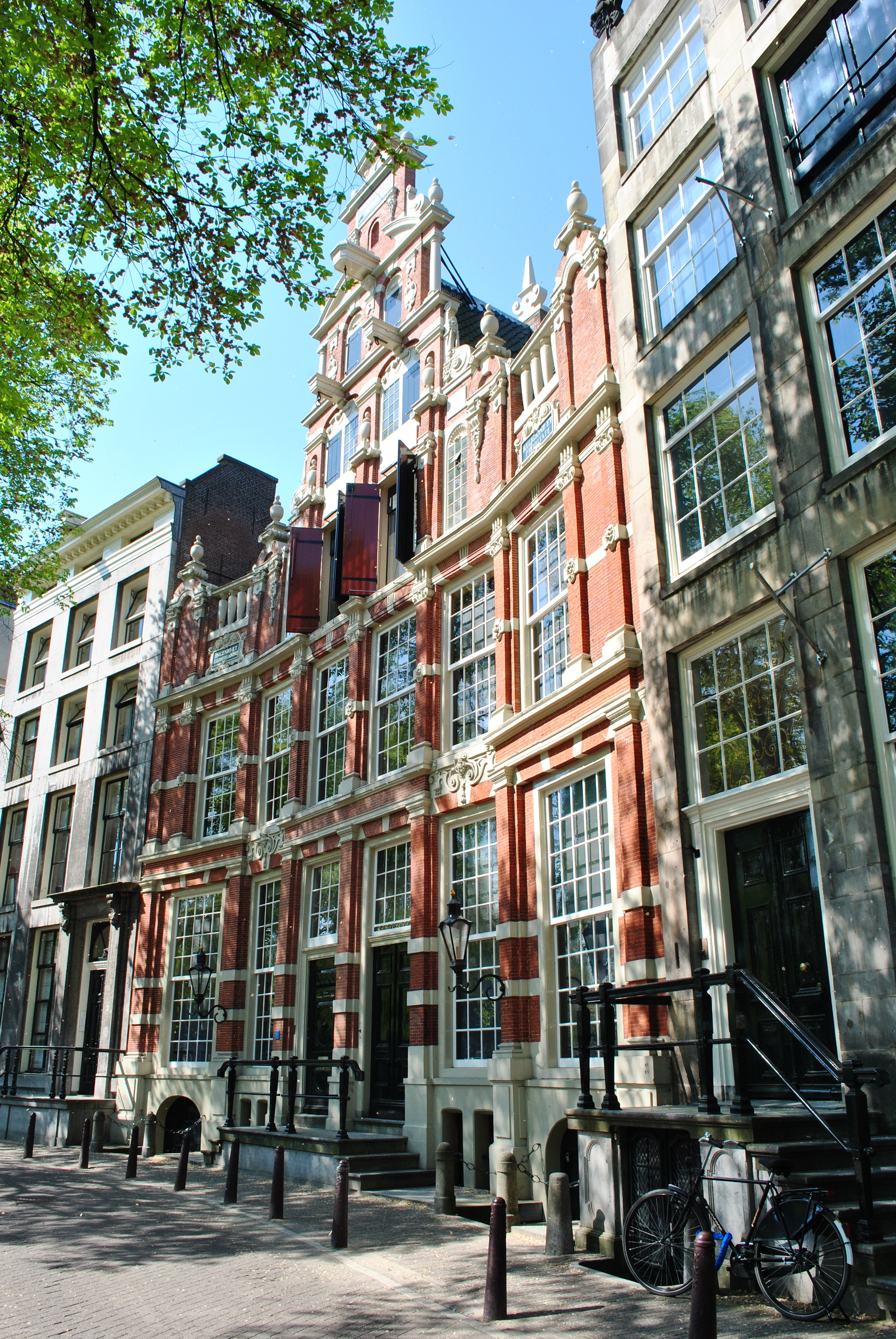
Pieter de Keyser oversaw the completion of Huis Bartolotti in c. 1617

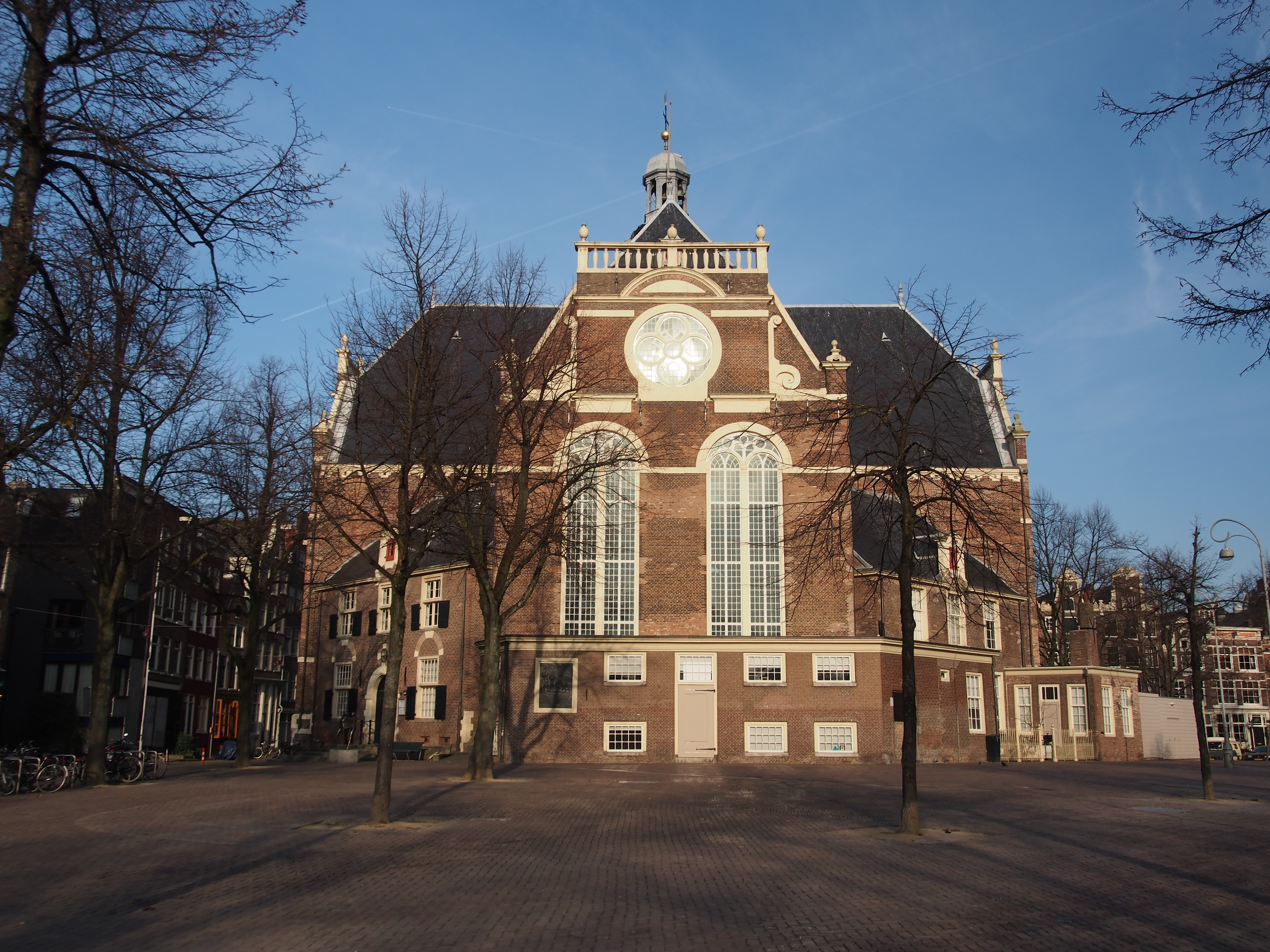
Pieter de Keyser completed the Noorderkerk in Amsterdam following his father's death in 1621

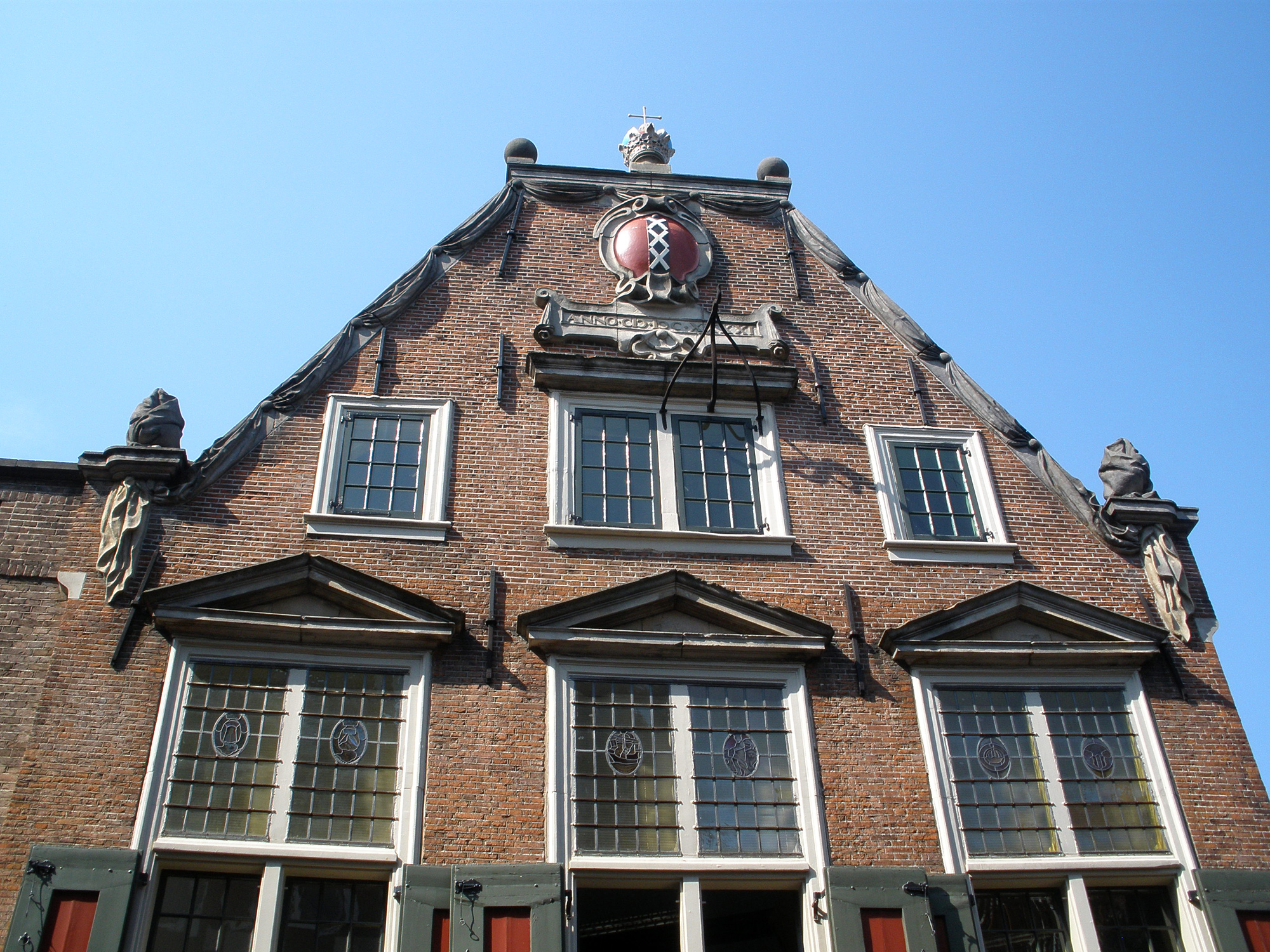
The Saaihal in Amsterdam, designed by Pieter de Keyser, dates from 1641

Pieter de Keyser (c.1595 – 15 September 1676 (buried)) was a Dutch Golden Age architect (bouwmeester) and sculptor. He followed in the footsteps of his father Hendrick de Keyser and completed a number of Hendrick de Keyser's buildings after his death in 1621.

== Life and work ==
Pieter de Keyser was born and died in Amsterdam. He was commissioned by his father to oversee the construction of the Huis Bartolotti house on the Herengracht canal in Amsterdam in c. 1617. After his father's death in 1621, he succeeded him as Amsterdam's master mason (stadssteenhouwer) and oversaw the completion of the Westerkerk and Noorderkerk churches, as well as the Huis met de Hoofden house on Keizersgracht canal. In addition, he finished two other uncompleted projects of his father's: a mausoleum for William the Silent in the Nieuwe Kerk in Delft as well as a statue of Erasmus in Rotterdam.

De Keyser also designed and oversaw the construction of the Saaihal (1641) in Amsterdam, as well as the gallery and boys' school of the city's Civil Orphanage (Burgerweeshuis), now the Amsterdam Museum. The Accijnshuis (1637) building in Amsterdam is usually attributed to Jacob van Campen but could also have been designed by Pieter de Keyser.

His work in sculpture includes a mausoleum for the naval commander Piet Hein in the Oude Kerk in Delft, a mausoleum for stadholder William Louis of Nassau-Dillenburg in Leeuwarden, a mausoleum for Adriaan Pauw in the Reformed Church at Heemstede, and a mausoleum for Swedish military commander Erik Soop in the cathedral of Skara, Sweden.

Pieter de Keyser was married three times: to Magdalena Geens (1623), Magdalena Jacobs (1625), and Catharina Beghin or Bagijn (1639).

His brother Willem de Keyser also became an architect; Thomas de Keyser chose to become a painter, although he combined it with dealing in petit Granit on Brouwersgracht. Pieter dealt in marble and in 1654 he bought his brother's stone business.

== Sources ==
- Amsterdam Monumenten: Hendrik de Keyser (Dutch)
- Amsterdam Monumenten: Het Huis Bartolotti (Dutch)
