= Borodino (disambiguation) =

Borodino was an 1812 battle in the Napoleonic Wars during the French invasion of Russia.

Borodino may also refer to:

== Places ==
- Borodino, Krasnoyarsk Krai, Russia
- Borodino (village), Mozhaysky District, Moscow Oblast, Russia, namesake of the Battle of Borodino
- Borodino, Perm Krai, Russia
- Borodino, Kameshkovsky District, Vladimir Oblast, Russia
- Borodino, Suzdalsky District, Vladimir Oblast, Russia
- Borodino, Vyaznikovsky District, Vladimir Oblast, Russia
- Borodino, Volgograd Oblast, Russia
- Borodino, former name of Budzhak, Odesa Oblast, Ukraine
- Borodino, New York, a hamlet in the United States
- Daitō Islands or Borodino Islands, Japan
- Smith Island (South Shetland Islands) or Borodino Island

== Ships ==
- Borodino (1813 ship)
- Borodino (1826 ship)
- Borodino-class battleship, a class of Russian pre-dreadnought battleships
  - Russian battleship Borodino, the lead ship of the class
- Borodino-class battlecruiser, a class of Russian battlecruisers launched during World War I but never completed
- Borodino-class motorship, a class of Russian river passenger ships

== Other uses ==
- Borodino (poem), a poem by Mikhail Lermontov
- 3544 Borodino, a main-belt asteroid
- Borodino meteorite, a meteorite that fell near Borodino, Russia, in 1812
- The Battle of Borodino: Napoleon in Russia 1812, a 1972 board wargame that simulates the 1812 battle

== See also ==
- Battle at Borodino Field, a 1941 battle
- Borodino, Russia, a list of inhabited localities in Russia
- List of ships named Borodino
