= Borodino, Russia =

Borodino (Russian: Бородино) is the name of several inhabited localities in Russia.

== Modern localities ==
=== Bryansk Oblast ===
As of 2012, one rural locality in Bryansk Oblast bears this name:

- Borodino, Bryansk Oblast, a village in Lopushsky Rural Administrative Okrug of Vygonichsky District; 53°5′N 34°1′E

=== Ivanovo Oblast ===
As of 2012, three rural localities in Ivanovo Oblast bear this name:

- Borodino, Gavrilovo-Posadsky District, Ivanovo Oblast, a selo in Gavrilovo-Posadsky District
- Borodino, Kineshemsky District, Ivanovo Oblast, a village in Kineshemsky District
- Borodino, Palekhsky District, Ivanovo Oblast, a village in Palekhsky District

=== Kaliningrad Oblast ===
As of 2012, one rural locality in Kaliningrad Oblast bears this name:

- Borodino, Kaliningrad Oblast, a settlement in Mozyrsky Rural Okrug of Pravdinsky District

=== Kaluga Oblast ===
As of 2012, one rural locality in Kaluga Oblast bears this name:

- Borodino, Kaluga Oblast, a village in Medynsky District

=== Kemerovo Oblast ===
As of 2012, one rural locality in Kemerovo Oblast bears this name:

- Borodino, Kemerovo Oblast, a settlement under the administrative jurisdiction of Myski Town Under Oblast Jurisdiction; 53°44′N 87°45′E

=== Republic of Khakassia ===
As of 2012, one rural locality in the Republic of Khakassia bears this name:

- Borodino, Republic of Khakassia, a selo in Borodinsky Selsoviet of Bogradsky District

=== Kostroma Oblast ===
As of 2012, three rural localities in Kostroma Oblast bear this name:

- Borodino, Dmitriyevskoye Settlement, Galichsky District, Kostroma Oblast, a village in Dmitriyevskoye Settlement of Galichsky District; 58°12′N 42°14′E
- Borodino, Orekhovskoye Settlement, Galichsky District, Kostroma Oblast, a village in Orekhovskoye Settlement of Galichsky District; 58°28′N 41°50′E
- Borodino, Sharyinsky District, Kostroma Oblast, a village in Shangskoye Settlement of Sharyinsky District; 58°27′N 45°36′E

=== Krasnoyarsk Krai ===
As of 2012, two inhabited localities in Krasnoyarsk Krai bear this name:

Urban localities

- Borodino, Krasnoyarsk Krai, a town; administratively incorporated as a krai city

Rural localities

- Borodino, Rybinsky District, Krasnoyarsk Krai, a selo in Borodinsky Selsoviet of Rybinsky District

=== Kurgan Oblast ===
As of 2012, one rural locality in Kurgan Oblast bears this name:

- Borodino, Kurgan Oblast, a village in Prosekovsky Selsoviet of Vargashinsky District; 55°57′N 66°14′E

=== Kursk Oblast ===
As of 2012, one rural locality in Kursk Oblast bears this name:

- Borodino, Kursk Oblast, a village in Kolpakovsky Selsoviet of Kurchatovsky District

=== Moscow Oblast ===
As of 2012, ten rural localities in Moscow Oblast bear this name:

- Borodino (settlement), Mozhaysky District, Moscow Oblast, a settlement in Borodinskoye Rural Settlement of Mozhaysky District; 55°30′N 35°52′E
- Borodino, Sinkovskoye Rural Settlement, Dmitrovsky District, Moscow Oblast, a village in Sinkovskoye Rural Settlement of Dmitrovsky District; 56°21′N 37°10′E
- Borodino, Dmitrov, Dmitrovsky District, Moscow Oblast, a village under the administrative jurisdiction of the Town of Dmitrov in Dmitrovsky District; 56°21′N 37°36′E
- Borodino, Lotoshinsky District, Moscow Oblast, a village in Osheykinskoye Rural Settlement of Lotoshinsky District; 56°16′N 35°56′E
- Borodino (village), Mozhaysky District, Moscow Oblast, a village in Borodinskoye Rural Settlement of Mozhaysky District, and namesake of the Battle of Borodino; 55°32′N 35°49′E
- Borodino, Mytishchinsky District, Moscow Oblast, a village under the administrative jurisdiction of the Town of Mytishchi in Mytishchinsky District; 55°55′N 37°9′E
- Borodino, Podolsky District, Moscow Oblast, a village in Lagovskoye Rural Settlement of Podolsky District; 55°23′N 37°28′E
- Borodino, Shatursky District, Moscow Oblast, a village in Dmitrovskoye Rural Settlement of Shatursky District
- Borodino, Solnechnogorsky District, Moscow Oblast, a village in Smirnovskoye Rural Settlement of Solnechnogorsky District
- Borodino, Taldomsky District, Moscow Oblast, a village in Yermolinskoye Rural Settlement of Taldomsky District

=== Novgorod Oblast ===
As of 2012, one rural locality in Novgorod Oblast bears this name:

- Borodino, Novgorod Oblast, a village in Ivanovskoye Settlement of Starorussky District

=== Oryol Oblast ===
As of 2012, one rural locality in Oryol Oblast bears this name:

- Borodino, Oryol Oblast, a selo in Borodinsky Selsoviet of Dmitrovsky District

=== Perm Krai ===
As of 2012, one rural locality in Perm Krai bears this name:

- Borodino, Perm Krai, a village in Beryozovsky District

=== Pskov Oblast ===
As of 2012, six rural localities in Pskov Oblast bear this name:

- Borodino, Loknyansky District, Pskov Oblast, a village in Loknyansky District
- Borodino (Goluboozerskaya Rural Settlement), Nevelsky District, Pskov Oblast, a village in Nevelsky District; municipally, a part of Goluboozerskaya Rural Settlement of that district
- Borodino (Turichinskaya Rural Settlement), Nevelsky District, Pskov Oblast, a village in Nevelsky District; municipally, a part of Turichinskaya Rural Settlement of that district
- Borodino, Novorzhevsky District, Pskov Oblast, a village in Novorzhevsky District
- Borodino, Opochetsky District, Pskov Oblast, a village in Opochetsky District
- Borodino, Palkinsky District, Pskov Oblast, a village in Palkinsky District

=== Rostov Oblast ===
As of 2012, one rural locality in Rostov Oblast bears this name:

- Borodino, Rostov Oblast, a khutor in Nizhnekundryuchenskoye Rural Settlement of Ust-Donetsky District

=== Smolensk Oblast ===
As of 2012, two rural localities in Smolensk Oblast bear this name:

- Borodino, Rudnyansky District, Smolensk Oblast, a village in Lyubavichskoye Rural Settlement of Rudnyansky District
- Borodino, Vyazemsky District, Smolensk Oblast, a village in Novoselskoye Rural Settlement of Vyazemsky District

=== Tula Oblast ===
As of 2012, one rural locality in Tula Oblast bears this name:

- Borodino, Tula Oblast, a village in Podosinovsky Rural Okrug of Kireyevsky District

=== Tver Oblast ===
As of 2012, nine rural localities in Tver Oblast bear this name:

- Borodino, Kalyazinsky District, Tver Oblast, a village in Semendyayevskoye Rural Settlement of Kalyazinsky District
- Borodino, Ilyinskoye Rural Settlement, Kimrsky District, Tver Oblast, a village in Ilyinskoye Rural Settlement of Kimrsky District
- Borodino, Neklyudovskoye Rural Settlement, Kimrsky District, Tver Oblast, a village in Neklyudovskoye Rural Settlement of Kimrsky District
- Borodino, Kuvshinovsky District, Tver Oblast, a village in Tysyatskoye Rural Settlement of Kuvshinovsky District
- Borodino, Ostashkovsky District, Tver Oblast, a village in Moshenskoye Rural Settlement of Ostashkovsky District
- Borodino, Penovsky District, Tver Oblast, a village in Okhvatskoye Rural Settlement of Penovsky District
- Borodino, Sonkovsky District, Tver Oblast, a village in Pishchalkinskoye Rural Settlement of Sonkovsky District
- Borodino, Torzhoksky District, Tver Oblast, a village in Rudnikovskoye Rural Settlement of Torzhoksky District
- Borodino, Vesyegonsky District, Tver Oblast, a village in Lyubegoshchinskoye Rural Settlement of Vesyegonsky District

=== Tyumen Oblast ===
As of 2012, one rural locality in Tyumen Oblast bears this name:

- Borodino, Tyumen Oblast, a selo in Kotochigovsky Rural Okrug of Vikulovsky District

=== Vladimir Oblast ===
As of 2012, three rural localities in Vladimir Oblast bear this name:

- Borodino, Kameshkovsky District, Vladimir Oblast, a village in Kameshkovsky District
- Borodino, Suzdalsky District, Vladimir Oblast, a village in Suzdalsky District
- Borodino, Vyaznikovsky District, Vladimir Oblast, a village in Vyaznikovsky District

=== Volgograd Oblast ===
As of 2012, one rural locality in Volgograd Oblast bears this name:

- Borodino, Volgograd Oblast, a khutor in Rossoshensky Selsoviet of Gorodishchensky District

=== Vologda Oblast ===
As of 2012, one rural locality in Vologda Oblast bears this name:

- Borodino, Vologda Oblast, a village in Nikiforovsky Selsoviet of Ustyuzhensky District

=== Yaroslavl Oblast ===
As of 2012, four rural localities in Yaroslavl Oblast bear this name:

- Borodino, Borisoglebsky District, Yaroslavl Oblast, a village in Shchurovsky Rural Okrug of Borisoglebsky District
- Borodino, Lyubimsky District, Yaroslavl Oblast, a village in Voskresensky Rural Okrug of Lyubimsky District
- Borodino, Rostovsky District, Yaroslavl Oblast, a village in Savinsky Rural Okrug of Rostovsky District
- Borodino, Uglichsky District, Yaroslavl Oblast, a village in Klementyevsky Rural Okrug of Uglichsky District

== Abolished localities ==
- Borodino, Kardymovsky District, Smolensk Oblast, a village in Berezkinskoye Rural Settlement of Kardymovsky District in Smolensk Oblast; abolished in July 2010

== Alternative names ==
- Borodino, alternative name of Borodinka, a village in Saratovsky Selsoviet of Makushinsky District in Kurgan Oblast; 54°52′N 66°45′E
