= Jules César =

Jules César, French for Julius Caesar, may refer to:

- Chaussée Jules César, a Roman road in modern-day France

== People with the given names ==
- Cesar van Loo or Jules César Denis van Loo (1743–1821), French painter
- Marie Jules César Savigny (1777–1851), French zoologist

== See also ==
- Cesar (disambiguation)
- Giulio Cesare (disambiguation), the Italian form
- Jules
- Julio Cesar (disambiguation), the Spanish and Portuguese form
- Julius Caesar (disambiguation)
