= Caesar (disambiguation) =

Julius Caesar (100–44 BC) was a Roman general and dictator.

Caesar or Cæsar may also refer to:

== Places ==
- Caesar, Zimbabwe
- Caesar Creek State Park, in southwestern Ohio

== People ==
- Caesar (given name)
- Caesar (surname)
- Caesar (title), a title used by Roman and Byzantine emperors, and also at times by Ottoman emperors, derived from the dictator's name
  - Augustus (63 BC – 14 AD), adoptive son of the dictator and first Roman emperor
- Other members of the Julii Caesares, the family from which the dictator came
  - Gaius Julius Caesar (proconsul) (140–85 BC), father of the dictator
  - Claudius, fourth Roman emperor, first bearer of the name Claudius Caesar
  - Nero, fifth Roman emperor, second bearer of the name Claudius Caesar
- Caesar of Dyrrhachium, 1st-century bishop
- Caesar (slave) (d. 1852), Subject of an early photograph
- Bernhard Caesar Einstein (1930–2008), Swiss-American physicist and grandson of Albert Einstein
- Caesar the Geezer (born 1958), British radio personality
- Caesar, one half of the Indian choreographer duo Bosco–Caesar
- Fareed al-Madhhan, a Syrian whistleblower code-named Caesar and evidentiary source of the Caesar Report

== Art and entertainment ==
=== Fictional characters ===
- Caesar (Planet of the Apes)
- Caesar (Xena), in Xena: Warrior Princess
- Caesar, the founder & leader of Caesar's Legion in Fallout
- King Caesar, a monster in the Godzilla series
- Malik Caesar, in the video game Tales of Graces
- Caesar Flickerman, in The Hunger Games
- Caesar Salazar, in Cartoon Network's Generator Rex
- Caesar Anthonio Zeppeli, in the manga Jojo's Bizarre Adventure: Battle Tendency
- Caesar, a character in Girls und Panzer

=== Literature ===
- Caesar (McCullough novel), a 1998 novel by Colleen McCullough
- Caesar (Massie novel), a 1993 novel by Allan Massie
- Caesar, Life of a Colossus, a 2006 biography of Julius Caesar by Adrian Goldsworthy

=== Music ===
- Caesar (band), a Dutch indie rock band
- Caesars (band), a Swedish garage rock band
- "Caesar" (song), a 2010 song by I Blame Coco
- "Caesar", a 1993 song by Iggy Pop from American Caesar

=== Other uses in art and entertainment ===
- Caesar (Mercury Theatre), 1937 stage production of Orson Welles's Mercury Theatre
- Caesar (board game), a 1977 board wargame that simulates the Battle of Alesia
- Caesar (video game), a 1992 city-building computer game
- Caesar!, a British series of radio plays by Mike Walker
- The Caesars (TV series), a 1968 British television series
- "Caesar" (FBI: Most Wanted), a 2020 television episode

== Brands and enterprises ==
- Caesar Film, an Italian film company of the silent era
- Caesars Entertainment, a hotel and casino operator, among whose properties include:
  - Caesars Atlantic City, New Jersey, US
  - Caesars Palace, Las Vegas, Nevada, US
  - Caesars Southern Indiana, Elizabeth, Indiana, US
  - Caesars Tahoe, now MontBleu, Stateline, Nevada, US
  - Caesars Windsor, Ontario, Canada

== Food and drinks ==
- Caesar (cocktail), a Canadian cocktail
- Caesar salad
- Caesar's, Tijuana restaurant and birthplace of the eponymous salad
- Little Caesars, a pizza chain

== Military ==
- CAESAR self-propelled howitzer, a French artillery gun
- HMS Caesar, several ships of the Royal Navy
- Operation Caesar, a German World War II mission

== Science and technology ==
- CAESAR (spacecraft), a proposed NASA sample-return mission to comet 67P/Churyumov-Gerasimenko
- Caesar cipher, an encryption technique
- Caesarean section (often simply called "a caesar"), surgically assisted birth procedure
- Center of Advanced European Studies and Research
- Clean And Environmentally Safe Advanced Reactor, a nuclear reactor design
- Committee for the Scientific Examination of Religion
- Ctgf/hcs24 CAESAR, a cis-acting RNA element
- Euroradar CAPTOR, a radar system

== Other uses ==
- Caesar (dog), a fox terrier owned by King Edward VII
- Caesar (ship), three merchant ships and a privateer
- Caesar cut, a hairstyle
- Nottingham Caesars, an American football team

== See also ==
- List of things named after Julius Caesar
- Given name
  - Cesar (disambiguation)
  - Cesare (disambiguation)
  - Qaisar
- Title
  - Kaiser (disambiguation)
  - Kayser (disambiguation)
  - Keiser (disambiguation)
  - Czar (disambiguation)
  - Tsar (disambiguation)
  - Kay (title)
- Caesarea (disambiguation)
- Julius Caesar (disambiguation)
  - Giulio Cesare (disambiguation)
  - Julio Cesar (disambiguation)
- Little Caesar (disambiguation)
- Seasar, open source application framework
