= Caesar (ship) =

Several ships have been named Caesar for Julius Caesar:

- Caesar was a British privateer brig that the French frigate Caroline captured on 6 December 1807 and burnt. Caesar was a brig of 217 tons (bm), armed with fourteen 6-pounders and two 18-pounder carronades. Her master, Robert Harrison, had received his letter of marque on 1 January 1807.
- Caesar (1800 ship) was a West Indiaman launched on the Thames and wrecked in 1810 off the South Foreland.

The following vessels have been conflated on occasion due to their sharing a name and a launch origin, having a similar burthen, and one commencing to sail shortly after the other is no longer listed:

- Caesar (1810 ship) was launched on the Thames. She is last listed in 1824–1825.
- Caesar (1825 ship) was launched on the Thames. She traded with India and the East Indies under a licence from the British East India Company (EIC); she completed one voyage for the EIC (1832–1833) before she wrecked in 1833.
- Caesar (1825 lightship) was a lightship stationed at Carysfort Reef in the Florida Keys from 1826 to 1830. Run aground and abandoned before reaching her station, the ship was salvaged and entered service a year later. She was found to be riddled with dryrot only five years after her launch.

== See also ==
- HMS Caesar – one of four ships that have served the British Royal Navy
- HMS Cesar – mercantile brig launched in 1802 that the French Navy purchased at Bordeaux in 1803. The Royal Navy captured her in July 1806 and took her into service, but she was wrecked in early 1807.
