= Cesare =

Cesare is the Italian version of the given name Caesar, and surname Caesar.

== People with the given name ==
- Cesare Airaghi (1840–1896), Italian colonel
- Cesare Arzelà (1847–1912), Italian mathematician
- Cesare Battisti (disambiguation), several people
- Cesare Beccaria (1738–1794), Italian philosopher and politician
- Cesare Bocci (born 1957), Italian actor known for the Inspector Montalbano TV series
- Cesare Bonizzi (1946–2024), Franciscan friar and heavy metal singer
- Cesare Borgia (1475–1507), Italian general and statesman
- Cece Carlucci (Cesare Carlucci, 1917–2008), American baseball umpire
- Cesare Casadei (born 2003), Italian footballer
- Cesare Cursi (1942–2025), Italian politician
- Cesare Emiliani (1922–1995), Italian-American scientist
- Cesare Fiorio (born 1939), Italian sportsperson
- Cesare Gambara (c. 1516–1591), Bishop of Tortona and a figure of the Counter-Reformation
- Cesare Gianturco (1905–1995), Italian-American physician
- Cesare Ligini (1913–1988), Italian architect, urban planner and set designer
- Cesare Maldini (1932–2016), Italian professional football manager and player
- Cesare Nava (1861–1933), Italian engineer and politician
- Cesare Negri (c. 1535 – c. 1605), Italian dancer and choreographer
- Cesare Nosiglia (1944–2025), Italian Roman Catholic archbishop
- Cesare Pavese (1908–1950), Italian poet and novelist
- Cesare Ragazzi (1941–2024), Italian entrepreneur, inventor and television personality
- Cesare Romiti (1923–2020), Italian economist and businessman
- Cesare Ruperto (1925–2026), Italian judge
- Cesare Salvi (born 1948), Italian politician

== People with the surname ==
- Adam Cesare (born 1988), American horror novelist
- Billy Cesare (born 1955), American football player
- Davide Cesare (1977–2003), Italian anti-fascist activist
- Gigi Cesarè (born 2005), Latina American actress and recording artist
- Giovanni Martino Cesare (c. 1590 – 1667), Italian composer and cornett player
- Giulio Cesare (disambiguation), several people
- Oscar Cesare (1885–1948), Swedish-American cartoonist
- Silvio Cesare (fl. from 1993), Australian security researcher

== Fictional characters ==
- Cesare, in the silent film The Cabinet of Dr. Caligari
- Jenny Cesare, a Punisher supporting character

== See also ==
- Di Cesare, a surname
- De Cesare, a surname
- Cesar (name)
