= Cezary =

Cezary is the Polish version of the given name Caesar. Notable people with the name include:

- Cezary Balicki (born 1958), Polish bridge player
- Cezary Czpak (born 1982), Polish footballer, playing as a midfielder
- Cezary Geroń (1960–1998), Polish poet, journalist, translator and teacher
- Cezary Grabarczyk (born 1960), Polish politician
- Cezary Kaliszyk (born 1981), Polish academic
- Cezary Ketling-Szemley (1915–1979), Polish military officer and lawyer
- Cezary Kucharski (born 1972), Polish football player
- Cezary Ostrowski (born 1962), Polish composer, musician, songwriter, author, visual artist and journalist
- Cezary Pazura (born 1962), Polish actor known for comedy roles in movies such as Kiler, Chłopaki nie płaczą, etc.
- Cezary Skubiszewski (born 1949), Poland-born Australian composer for film, television and orchestra
- Cezary Trybański (born 1979), Polish basketball player
- Cezary Wilk (born 1986), Polish footballer (midfielder)
- Cezary Zamana (born 1967), Polish professional road racing cyclist
