= Julio Cesar =

Julio César and Júlio César are the terms for Julius Caesar in Spanish and Portuguese languages respectively. They may also refer to:

== Academics ==
- Julio Cesar Firrufino (1578–1651), Spanish engineer and mathematician
- Júlio César de Mello e Souza (1895–1974), Brazilian writer and mathematics professor
- Julio César Gutiérrez Vega, Mexican physicist
- Julio César Jobet (1912–1980), Chilean historian

== Entertainment ==
- Julio Cesar Cedillo, Mexican-American actor

== Music ==
- Julio César Meza (born 1983), Colombian singer
- Julio César Brero (1908–1973), Argentine composer
- Julio César Usma, Colombian singer

== Politics ==
- Julio César Arana (1864–1952), Peruvian politician
- Julio César Franco (born 1951), Paraguayan politician
- Julio César Godoy Toscano (born 1965), Mexican politician
- Julio César Grauert (1902–1933), Uruguayan political figure
- Julio César Méndez Montenegro (1915–1996), Guatemalan politician
- Julio César Pereyra (born 1951), Mayor of Florencio Varela, Buenos Aires, Argentina
- Julio César Strassera (1933–2015), Argentine prosecutor during the 1985 Trial of the Juntas
- Julio César Turbay Ayala (1916–2005), President of Colombia from 1978 to 1982
- Julio César Gámez Interiano (born 1955), Honduran politician

== Religion ==
- Julio César Grassi (born 1956), Argentine Roman Catholic priest and convicted child rapist and fraudster

== Sport ==
=== Association football ===
==== Players ====
- Júlio César (footballer, born 1956) (Júlio César da Silva Gurjol), Brazilian international striker
- Júlio César (footballer, born 1963) (Júlio César da Silva), Brazilian international defender
- Júlio César (footballer, born November 1978) (Júlio César Santos Correa), Brazilian defender
- Júlio César (football goalkeeper, born 1979) (Júlio César Soares de Espíndola), Brazilian international goalkeeper
- Júlio César (footballer, born 1982) (Júlio César Coelho de Moraes Júnior), Brazilian defender
- Júlio César (footballer, born January 1983) (Júlio César Mendes Moreira), Brazilian midfielder
- Júlio César (footballer, born December 1983) (Júlio César de Oliveira Martins), Brazilian midfielder
- Júlio César (footballer, born 1984) (Júlio César de Souza Santos), Brazilian goalkeeper
- Júlio César (footballer, born 1986) (Júlio César Jacobi), Brazilian goalkeeper
- Júlio César (footballer, born March 1995) (Júlio César de Freitas Filho), Brazilian defender
- Julio César de Andrade Moura (born 1965), Brazilian born Peruvian international, commonly known as Julinho
- Júlio César António de Souza (born 1976), Brazilian forward
- Julio César Arzú (born 1954), Honduran goalkeeper
- Julio César Baldivieso (born 1971), Bolivian international midfielder
- Júlio César Basilio da Silva (born 1996), Brazilian defender
- Julio César Benítez (1940–1968), Uruguayan defender
- Julio César Britos (1926–1998), Uruguayan forward
- Julio César Cáceres (born 1979), Paraguayan international defender for Club Olimpia
- Júlio César da Cruz Coimbra (born 1980), Brazilian defender
- Julio César Enciso (footballer, born 1974), Paraguayan international midfielder
- Julio César Enciso (footballer, born 2004), Paraguayan midfielder
- Julio César Gaona (born 1973), Argentinian goalkeeper for Crucero del Norte
- Julio César Hurtado (born 1983), Bolivian midfielder for Club Blooming
- Julio César Laffatigue (born 1980), Argentine forward for Querétaro F.C.
- Julio César de León (born 1979), Honduran footballer for Platense
- Julio César Manzur (born 1981), Paraguayan defender for Club Olimpia
- Júlio César Martins (born 1978), Brazilian goalkeeper for Red Bull Brasil
- Julio Cesar Moreira Ribeiro (born 1995), Brazilian forward
- Júlio César do Nascimento (born 1979), Brazilian midfielder for Al Shabab Al Arabi Club
- Júlio César de Paula Muniz Júnior (born 1988), Brazilian midfielder for Americana
- Julio César Pinheiro (born 1976), Mexican defender for Japanese club Kyoto Sanga F.C.
- Julio César Ramírez (born 1974), Uruguayan, last with Progreso
- Júlio César Rocha Costa (born 1980), Brazilian defender
- Julio César Romero (born 1960), Paraguayan midfielder, commonly known as Romerito
- Julio Cesar Serrano (born 1981), Argentine midfielder for ŠK Slovan Bratislava
- Júlio César da Silva Gurjol (born 1956), Brazilian forward, known as Júlio César Uri Geller
- Júlio César da Silva e Souza (born 1980), Brazilian left winger for Gaziantepspor
- Julio César Suazo (born 1978), Honduran defender
- Júlio César Teixeira (born 1979), Brazilian fullback, better known as Julinho
- Julio César Tobar (born 1978), Colombian defender for Millonarios
- Julio César Valdivia (born 1982), Mexican goalkeeper for Cruz Azul
- Julio César Yegros (born 1971), Paraguayan striker
- Júlio César Zabotto (born 1983), Brazilian midfielder for Americana
- Julio Furch (born 1989), German-Argentine forward for Club Olimpo
- Julio Maya (born 1985), Cuban forward for River Plate Puerto Rico

==== Managers ====
- Julio César Cortés (born 1941), former Uruguayan international midfielder and manager
- Julio César Falcioni (born 1956), Argentine football manager and former goalkeeper
- Júlio César Leal (born 1951), Brazilian manager
- Julio César Moreno (born 1969), Chilean manager
- Julio César Ribas (born 1957), Uruguayan manager
- Julio César Toresani (1967–2019), Argentine manager and former midfielder
- Julio César Uribe (born 1958), Peruvian manager and former midfielder

=== Boxing ===
- Julio César Borboa (born 1969), Mexican super flyweight
- Julio César Chávez (born 1962), Mexican multi-weight
- Julio César Chávez Jr. (born 1986), Mexican multi-weight
- Julio César García (born 1987), Mexican middleweight
- Julio César Green (born 1967), Dominican middleweight
- Julio César González (born 1976), Mexican light-heavyweight
- Julio César Miranda (born 1980), Mexican flyweight
- Julio César Vásquez (born 1966), Argentine middleweight

=== Cycling ===
- Julio César Aguirre (born 1969), Colombian road racer
- Julio César Blanco (born 1976), Venezuelan road racer
- Julio César Herrera (born 1977), Cuban track racer
- Julio César Rangel (born 1968), Colombian road racer

=== Other sports ===
- Julio Cesar (mixed martial artist) (born 1994), Brazilian featherweight
- Julio César Urías (born 1972), Guatemalan race walker
- Julio Cesar Giraldo (born 1995), Colombian rugby player
- Julio Anaya (born 1991), Panamanian basketball referee; full name Julio César
- Julio Sánchez (born 1955), Nicaraguan baseball player and manager

== Other uses ==
- Julio César Salas Municipality, Venezuela

== See also ==
- Cesar (disambiguation)
- Julius Caesar (disambiguation)
