= Julius Caesar (disambiguation) =

Julius Caesar (Gaius Julius Caesar, 100 BC – 44 BC) was a Roman general and statesman.

Julius Caesar may also refer to:

== People ==
=== People with the name ===
- Julius Caesar (judge) (1557/8–1636), English judge and politician
- Julius Caesar (cricketer) (1830–1878), Surrey cricketer

=== People with the nomen and cognomen ===
- Julii Caesares, ancient Roman branch of the Julii gens
  - Gaius Julius Caesar (name)
  - Drusus Julius Caesar (disambiguation)
  - Lucius Julius Caesar (disambiguation)
  - Sextus Julius Caesar (disambiguation)

=== People with the given name ===
- Julius C. Alford (Julius Caesar Alford, 1799–1863), American politician
- Julius Caesar Aranzi (1529–1589), Italian anatomist
- Don Julius Caesar d'Austria (1584–1609), illegitimate son of Holy Roman Emperor Rudolf II
- Julius C. Burrows (Julius Caesar Burrows, 1837–1913), American politician
- Julius Caesar Cantelmi (1457–after 1491), Roman Catholic bishop
- Julius Capaccio (Julius Caesar Capaccio, 1552–1631), learned Italian humanist
- Julius Caesar Chappelle (1852–1904), American politician
- Julius Caesar Czarnikow (1838–1909), British-German businessman
- Julius Caesar Herrera (born 1954), Filipino politician
- Julius Caesar Ibbetson (1759–1817), British painter
- Julius Caesar de Miranda (1906–1956), Surinamese politician
- Julius Caesar Scaliger (1484–1558), Italian physician
- J. C. Strauss (Julius Caesar Strauss, 1857–1924), American photographer
- Jules Bass (Julius Caesar Bass, 1935–2022), American director, composer and author
- J. C. Watts (Julius Caesar Watts Jr., born 1957), American politician
- Julius Caesar Vaquilar, Filipino politician

== Arts and entertainment ==
=== Fictional characters ===
- Cultural depictions of Julius Caesar
- Julius Caesar (Shakespeare character), the title character in Shakespeare's play Julius Caesar
- Gaius Julius Caesar (Rome character)
- Gaius Julius Caesar (Spartacus character)
- Julius Caesar (Asterix)
- Julius Caesar (Xena: Warrior Princess)
- Julius Caesar Dithers, in Blondie

=== Music ===
- Julius Caesar (overture), by Robert Schumann, 1851
- Julius Caesar (album), by Smog, 1993
- Giulio Cesare, a 1724 opera by Handel

=== Film and television ===
- Julius Caesar (1914 film), an Italian film
- Julius Caesar (1950 film), starring Charlton Heston
- Julius Caesar (1953 film), starring Marlon Brando, James Mason, and John Gielgud
- Julius Caesar (1970 film), starring Charlton Heston, Jason Robards, and Richard Johnson
- Julius Caesar, a 1979 BBC Television Shakespeare adaptation of Shakespeare's play
- Julius Caesar (miniseries), a 2002-2003 American-Italian-Dutch-German miniseries about the life of Julius Caesar

=== Other uses in arts and entertainment ===
- Julius Caesar (play), a 1599 play by William Shakespeare
- Julius Caesar (Andrea Ferrucci), a 16th-century statue
- Julius Caesar (block wargame), 2000

== Other uses ==
- Julius Caesar (crater), an impact crater on the Moon

== See also ==
- Julius (disambiguation)
- Caesar (disambiguation)
- Gaius Julius Caesar (disambiguation)
- Giulio Cesare (disambiguation), Italian form of "Julius Caesar"
- Julio Cesar (disambiguation), Spanish and Portuguese form of "Julius Caesar"
- Assassination of Julius Caesar (disambiguation)
- Death of Caesar (disambiguation)
- General Julicaesar, a villain from the series Great Mazinger
- Cajus Julius Caesar (born 1951), German politician
