= List of ships named Borodino =

Several ships have been named Borodino (Russian: Бородино) for the 1812 Battle of Borodino:

== Merchant ships ==
- Borodino (1813 ship) was launched at South Shields. She served as a government transport and was wrecked in 1830.
- Borodino (1826 ship) was almost surely launched as Caesar (1810 ship). Borodino first appeared in Lloyd's Register in 1826, but with launch year 1810, and launch location "River", i.e., the Thames. In 1828 she transported convicts to New South Wales from Cork. She was last listed in 1833.
- Borodino (1830 ship), Russian Iezekiil class – Hulked 1847.
- Borodino (1858 ship) was built by Andrew Leslie & Co., at Hebburn Yard, Newcastle-on-Tyne. She was of 200 gross register tons (GRT), and was an iron, one-screw steam ship.

== Russian/Soviet naval ships ==
- Russian frigate Borodino, a 74-gun ship, cut down as frigate in 1855 – Decommissioned in 1863.
- Russian battleship Borodino, a pre-dreadnought battleship launched in 1901 and sunk in 1905 at the Battle of Tsushima.
- Russian battlecruiser Borodino, a Russian Borodino-class battlecruiser that was launched in 1915, but never completed.
- Soviet training ship Borodino, a Borodino-class training ship constructed and operated during the Cold War.

== See also ==
- List of ships of the line of Russia
- Borodino-class battleship
- Borodino-class battlecruiser
- Borodino-class training ship
- Borodino-class motorship, a class of Russian river passenger ships
