= French ship César =

At least two ships of the French Navy have been named César:

- French ship César (1768), a 74-gun César-class ship of the line launched in 1768 and sunk in 1782
- French ship César (1807), a 74-gun Téméraire-class ship of the line launched in 1807, ceded to the Netherlands in 1814 and renamed Prins Frederik. She was broken up in 1821

== See also ==
- César (1802 ship), a French mercantile brig later captured by the Royal Navy
- Cesar (disambiguation)
