= Cesarec =

Cesarec is a Croatian surname.

Notable people with the name include:

- August Cesarec (1893–1941), Croatian writer and activist
- Danijel Cesarec (born 1983), Croatian footballer

== See also ==
- Cesar (disambiguation)
