= List of shipwrecks in October 1833 =

The list of shipwrecks in October 1833 includes ships sunk, foundered, grounded, or otherwise lost during October 1833.

== 2 October ==
List of shipwrecks: 2 October 1833
Ship	State	Description
Avonmore	United Kingdom	The ship struck a rock in the River Blackwater, capsized and sank. She was on a voyage from Youghal, County Cork to Liverpool, Lancashire.
Mulgrave Castle	United Kingdom	The ship ran aground in the Humber and capsized. Her crew were rescued. She was on a voyage from Petitcodiac, New Brunswick, British North America to Hull, Yorkshire. She was refloated on 12 October and taken in to Hull.
Richard	United Kingdom	The ship foundered in the English Channel off Portland, Dorset. Her crew were rescued. She was on a voyage from Dunkirk, Nord, France to Liverpool, Lancashire.
Thomas	United Kingdom	The ship was destroyed by fire at Hobart, Van Diemen's Land.

== 5 October ==
List of shipwrecks: 5 October 1833
Ship	State	Description
Robert	United Kingdom	The ship was wrecked on the Gunfleet Sand, in the North Sea off the coast of Essex. Her crew were rescued.

== 8 October ==
List of shipwrecks: 8 October 1833
Ship	State	Description
Concordia	United Kingdom	The ship was in collision with Montreal (United Kingdom) in the English Channel off Dover, Kent and sank with the loss of her captain. She was on a voyage from Liverpool, Lancashire to Dordrecht, South Holland, Netherlands.
Crown Princess Wilhelmina	Stettin	The ship was wrecked near Frederikshavn, Denmark. She was on a voyage from Stettin to Berwick upon Tweed, Northumberland, United Kingdom.
Mercury	India	The barque departed from Calcutta for King George Sound. No further trace, presumed foundered with the loss of all on board, 70 crew plus her passengers. She may have been wrecked in the Cocos Islands or Keeling Islands.

== 9 October ==
List of shipwrecks: 9 October 1833
Ship	State	Description
Cæsar	United Kingdom	The ship was wrecked on the Grand River Reef, off Port Louis, Mauritius with the loss of two of her crew. Survivors were rescued by HMS Talbot (Royal Navy). She was on a voyage from London to Bengal, India.

== 10 October ==
List of shipwrecks: 10 October 1833
Ship	State	Description
Carl Johan	Sweden	The ship departed from Stockholm. No further trace, presumed lost with all hands.
William Pitt	United Kingdom	The ship was wrecked in Narva Bay. Her crew were rescued.

== 11 October ==
List of shipwrecks: 11 October 1833
Ship	State	Description
Ely	United Kingdom	The ship was wrecked on Anegada, Virgin Islands. She was on a voyage from London to St. Jago de Cuba, Cuba. Ely was later refloated and taken in to Tortola where she was condemned.
Lady Munro	India	The barque was wrecked on Île Amsterdam with the loss of 76 of her 97 passengers and crew. Survivors were rescued on 25 October by the schooner General Jackson (United States).
Montreal	United Kingdom	The barque was driven ashore at Cape North, Nova Scotia, British North America. Her crew were rescued. She was on a voyage from Hull, Yorkshire to Miramichi, New Brunswick, British North America.
Zephyr	United Kingdom	The ship was wrecked on the Tuskar Rock, County Wexford. Her crew were rescued.

== 12 October ==
List of shipwrecks: 12 October 1833
Ship	State	Description
Ann	United Kingdom	The ship foundered off Madeira, Portugal. Her crew were rescued.
William and Mary	United Kingdom	The schooner foundered between The Manacles and Falmouth, Cornwall. She was raised on 30 October by HMRC Active ( Board of Customs and Lavinia (United Kingdom and beached at Durford, Cornwall.

== 13 October ==
List of shipwrecks: 13 October 1833
Ship	State	Description
Ellice	United Kingdom	The ship was wrecked on the Maplin Sand, in the North Sea off the coast of Essex. Her crew were rescued.
New Helen	United Kingdom	The ship was wrecked near Harrington, Cumberland. She was on a voyage from Whitehaven, Cumberland to Killough, County Down.

== 14 October ==
List of shipwrecks: 14 October 1833
Ship	State	Description
Harriet; Harriette	United Kingdom	The ship, Skey, master, was wrecked on Pepper Island. Her crew were rescued. She was on a voyage from Mauritius to the Seychelles.
Hero	United Kingdom	The brig was driven ashore and wrecked at Rocken End, Isle of Wight with the loss of two of her seven crew. She was on a voyage from Dublin to London.
Ranger	United Kingdom	The ship was driven ashore at Cape Spartivento, Kingdom of Sardinia. She was on a voyage from Malta to Messina, Kingdom of the Two Sicilies.

== 15 October ==
List of shipwrecks: 15 October 1833
Ship	State	Description
Fanny	France	The ship ran aground off Dungeness, Kent, United Kingdom. She was refloated but consequently foundered. Fanny was on a voyage from Bordeaux, Gironde to Dunkirk, Nord.

== 16 October ==
List of shipwrecks: 16 October 1833
Ship	State	Description
Esther	(United Kingdom of Great Britain and Ireland) Jersey	The brig was lost on Nickman's Ground, in the Baltic Sea off Dagerort, Russia. Her crew were rescued.
Fanny	United Kingdom	The ship foundered in the Irish Sea off Holyhead, Anglesey. She was on a voyage from Dublin to Liverpool, Lancashire.
Good Agreement	United Kingdom	The ship foundered in the Atlantic Ocean off St. Paul Island, Nova Scotia, British North America. Her crew were rescued by Euphrosyne and Minerva (both United Kingdom).

== 17 October ==
List of shipwrecks: 17 October 1833
Ship	State	Description
Galatea	United Kingdom	The ship was wrecked on the Whiting Sand, in the North Sea off the coast of Suffolk. Her crew were rescued. She was on a voyage from Newcastle upon Tyne, Northumberland to London.
Rebecca	United Kingdom	The ship foundered in the North Sea off the Galloper Lightship ( Trinity House). Her crew were rescued. She was on a voyage from Berwick upon Tweed, Northumberland to London.
William	United Kingdom	The ship was wrecked near Skipsea, Yorkshire.
Witham	United Kingdom	The ship was wrecked.

== 18 October ==
List of shipwrecks: 18 October 1833
Ship	State	Description
Caroline	United Kingdom	The ship was lost near "Samborough". She was on a voyage from Saint Vincent to Quebec City, Lower Canada, British North America.
Deben	United Kingdom	The ship was driven ashore at Brielle, South Holland, Netherlands. She was on a voyage from Hull, Yorkshire to Rotterdam, South Holland. Deben was refloated on 24 October.
Elizabeth	United Kingdom	The ship was driven ashore on Læsø, Denmark. She was on a voyage from London to Saint Petersburg, Russia.
Minerva	(Russian Empire) Grand Duchy of Finland	The ship was driven ashore near Frederikshavn. She was on a voyage from Helsingfors to Cádiz, Spain.
Speculant	United Kingdom	The ship foundered in the Baltic Sea off Hiiumaa, Russia. She was on a voyage from Ventspils to Saint Petersburg.
St. Michael	United Kingdom	The ship was wrecked on the Elleboog Sandbank, at the mouth of the Scheldt. Her crew were rescued. She was on a voyage from Goole, Yorkshire to Antwerp, Belgium.

== 19 October ==
List of shipwrecks: 19 October 1833
Ship	State	Description
Agenoria	United States	The ship was lost at Red Head, Newfoundland, British North America. Her crew were rescued. She was on a voyage from New York City to Newfoundland.
Chatham	United Kingdom	The ship sprang a leak and foundered in the Atlantic Ocean 2 leagues (6 nautical miles (11 km)) off the coast of County Mayo with the loss of seven of her crew. Survivors were rescued by Eagle (United Kingdom). Chatham was on a voyage from Saint John's, Newfoundland, British North America to Poole, Dorset.
Clifton	United States	The ship was driven ashore and capsized on "Goree Island". Her crew were rescued. She was on a voyage from New York to Rotterdam, South Holland, Netherlands.
Sarah Margaret	United Kingdom	The brig was driven ashore and wrecked at Kilcorgan Point, County Galway. Her crew were rescued. She was on a voyage from Saint John's, Newfoundland, British North America to Galway.

== 20 October ==
List of shipwrecks: 20 October 1833
Ship	State	Description
Canning	United Kingdom	The ship was wreckled at "Dockera" Grand Duchy of Finland. She was on a voyage from Newry, County Down to Saint Petersburg, Russia.
Lancashire Witch	United Kingdom	The ship was driven ashore and wrecked at Veracruz, Mexico. Her crew were rescued.

== 21 October ==
List of shipwrecks: 21 October 1833
Ship	State	Description
Courier	United Kingdom	The steamship was driven ashore at Great Yarmouth, Norfolk with the loss of a crew member. She was on a voyage from London to Great Yarmouth.
Crusader	United Kingdom	The steamship was driven ashore at Dover, Kent. She was on a voyage from Ramsgate, Kent to Dover.
Hero	United Kingdom	The ship was wrecked on the south coast of the Isle of Wight with the loss of two of her seven crew. She was on a voyage from Dublin to London.
Lord Fife	United Kingdom	The ship was wrecked on the Buxey Sand, in the North Sea off the coast of Essex. Her crew were rescued. She was on a voyage from Lerwick, Shetland Islands to London.
Twende Brodre	Norway	The ship foundered near Fredrikstad.

== 23 October ==
List of shipwrecks: 23 October 1833
Ship	State	Description
Farmer's Delight	United Kingdom	The ship was driven ashore at Rye, Sussex. Her crew were rescued. She was on a voyage from Jersey, Channel Islands to Shoreham-by-Sea, Sussex. Farmer's Delight was refloated on 27 October and taken in to Rye.
James and Margaret	United Kingdom	The ship foundered in the North Sea. Her crew were rescued. She was on a voyage from Newcastle upon Tyne, Northumberland to Schiedam, South Holland, Netherlands.
Ocean	United Kingdom	The ship was driven ashore at Wells-next-the-Sea, Norfolk.

== 24 October ==
List of shipwrecks: 24 October 1833
Ship	State	Description
Rob Roy	United Kingdom	The ship was wrecked near Creden Head, County Waterford. Her crew were rescued. She was on a voyage from Waterford to London.

== 26 October ==
List of shipwrecks: 26 October 1833
Ship	State	Description
Fanny	United Kingdom	The ship was driven ashore at Helsingør, Denmark.

== 27 October ==
List of shipwrecks: 27 October 1833
Ship	State	Description
Earl of Egremont	United Kingdom	The ship was driven ashore near Wexford. She was on a voyage from Saint John, New Brunswick, British North America to Wexford. Earl of Egremont was refloated on 29 October.
Neptunus	Sweden	The sloop was wrecked near Porthleven, Cornwall, United Kingdom with the loss of all hands.

== 28 October ==
List of shipwrecks: 28 October 1833
Ship	State	Description
Frau Catherina	Netherlands	The ship was driven ashore on Samsø, Denmark. She was on a voyage from Copenhagen, Denmark to Culemborg, Gelderland.
Passe per Tout	France	The ship sprang a leak and was abandoned in the English Channel off Beachy Head, Sussex, United Kingdom. Ebenezer (United Kingdom rescued the crew. Passe per Tout was on a voyage from "Trique" to Dunkirk, Nord.
Three Sisters	United Kingdom	The ship was holed by an anchor and sank at Holyhead, Anglesey. She was on a voyage from Liverpool, Lancashire to Aberystwyth, Cardiganshire. Three Sisters was later refloated.

== 29 October ==
List of shipwrecks: 29 October 1833
Ship	State	Description
Dispatch	United Kingdom	The ship was driven ashore at Valencia, Spain.

== 30 October ==
List of shipwrecks: 30 October 1833
Ship	State	Description
Mary and William	United Kingdom	The ship sank near Abercastle, Pembrokeshire.

== 31 October ==
List of shipwrecks: 31 October 1833
Ship	State	Description
Betsey	United Kingdom	The ship was driven ashore and wrecked at "Port-Mary". Her crew were rescued.
Dorothy	United Kingdom	The ship was last sighted on this date whilst on a voyage from Londonderry to London. Presumed subsequently foundered with the loss of all hands.
Fame	United Kingdom	The ship foundered in the North Sea off Bamburgh, Northumberland. She was on a voyage from Alloa, Clackmannanshire to London.
Harmony	United Kingdom	The ship was driven ashore at Neath, Glamorgan. She was on a voyage from Falmouth, Cornwall to Swansea, Glamorgan.
Thomas and Harriet	United Kingdom	The ship foundered in the North Sea off Hollesley Bay, Suffolk. She was on a voyage from Boston, Lincolnshire to London.
William and Ann	United Kingdom	The ship foundered in the North Sea with the loss of all hands. She was on a voyage from Newcastle upon Tyne, Northumberland to Great Yarmouth, norfolk.

== Unknown date ==
List of shipwrecks: Unknown date in October 1833
Ship	State	Description
Ann and Margaret	United Kingdom	The brig was driven ashore and wrecked at Aberavon, Glamorgan. Her six crew were rescued.
Chace	United States	The ship was driven ashore on "Goree Island". She was later refloated and taken into Helvoet, South Holland, Netherlands.
Concordia	Netherlands	The ship was driven ashore on Texel, North Holland and was abandoned by her crew. She was on a voyage from Liverpool, Lancashire, United Kingdom to Harlingen, Friesland. Concordia was refloated on 25 October.
Countess of Stair	United Kingdom	The ship was wrecked at Portgordon, Morayshire with the loss of all four crew.
Ellill	United Kingdom	The ship ran aground on the Heaps Sand, in the North Sea off the coast of Essex in mid-October and was consequently beached at Harwich. Her crew were rescued by Liberty (United Kingdom).
Eugene	United States	The barque ran aground on the Gunfleet Sand, in the North Sea off the coast of Essex, United Kingdom in late October and was abandoned by her crew. She was refloated and taken in to Colchester, Essex on 1 November.
Defiance	(United Kingdom of Great Britain and Ireland) New South Wales	The schooner was driven ashore and wrecked on Lord Howe Island.
George	United Kingdom	The ship was lost on the Henda Bank. She was on a voyage from St Davids, Pembrokeshire to Dordrecht, South Holland, Netherlands.
Janet	United Kingdom	The sloop foundered off Kinghorn, Fife in mid-October. She was refloated in late November and taken in to Dysart, Fife.
Mary Jane	(United Kingdom of Great Britain and Ireland) New South Wales	The whaler was wrecked in the Navigator's Islands. Her crew were rescued.
Petit Eugene	France	The ship was wrecked near Honfleur, Calvados before 21 October.
Prince Leopold	United Kingdom	The ship was wrecked near the mouth of the River Wyre. She was on a voyage from the Isle of Man to Poulton-le-Fylde, Lancashire.
Repos	Belgium	The ship was driven ashore on Terschelling, Friesland. She was on a voyage from Bremen to Antwerp.
Sisters	United Kingdom	The ship foundered in the North Sea 16 nautical miles (30 km) north of "The Leven" with the loss of all hands. She was on a voyage from Perth to London.
Waterloo	(United Kingdom of Great Britain and Ireland) New South Wales	The whaling schooner was wrecked at Waikanae Beach on the Kāpiti Coast of New Zealand. All crew survived.
William	United Kingdom	The ship capsized off Tarragona, Spain. She was on a voyage from Tarragona to Rio de Janeiro, Brazil.
William Pitt	United Kingdom	The ship was lost at Narva, Russia.
