= Assassination of Julius Caesar (disambiguation) =

The assassination of Julius Caesar refers to the stabbing attack that killed Roman dictator Julius Caesar in 44 BCE.

Assassination of Caesar or Assassination of Julius Caesar may also refer to:

- Caesars (Roman emperors) who were assassinated, see List of Roman emperors
- The Assassination of Julius Caesar (Sullivan), a painting
- The Assassination of Julius Caesar (album), by Norwegian band Ulver
- The Assassination of Julius Caesar: A People's History of Ancient Rome, a book
- The Assassination of Caesar, a painting by Heinrich Fueger

== See also ==
- Death of Caesar (disambiguation)
- Julius Caesar (disambiguation)
- Caesar (disambiguation)
