= Death of Caesar (disambiguation) =

Death of Caesar refers to the assassination of Roman dictator Julius Caesar in 44 BCE.

Death of Caesar or Death of Julius Caesar may also refer to:

- The Death of Caesar (Gérôme), an 1867 painting
- The death of Caesar, an 1865 painting by Frederick Hamilton Jackson
- The death of Caesar (Janssens), a 17th/18th-century painting
- The Death of Julius Caesar (Camuccini), an 1806 painting
- La morte di Cesare, an 18th-century opera by Francesco Bianchi

== See also ==
- Assassination of Julius Caesar (disambiguation)
- Julius Caesar (disambiguation)
- Caesar (disambiguation)
- List of Roman emperors, for deaths of other Emperors Caesar
