= De Cesare =

De Cesare or DeCesare is a surname. Notable people with the surname include:

== People with the surname De Cesare ==
- Nicolò De Cesare (born 1990), Italian footballer
- Ciro De Cesare (born 1971), Italian footballer
- John De Cesare (1890–1972), American sculptor

== People with the surname DeCesare ==
- Carmella DeCesare (born 1982), American model
- Donald H. DeCesare (1924–2010), American politician
- Michele DeCesare, actress, daughter of David Chase

== See also ==
- Di Cesare, a name
- Cesare, a name
