= Tobar (surname) =

Tobar is a surname. Notable people with the surname include:

- Armando Tobar (1938–2016), Chilean soccer player
- Daniella Tobar, Chilean television actress
- Francisco Tobar García (1928–1997), Ecuadorian writer, diplomat and professor
- Irene Tobar (born 1989), Ecuadorian soccer player
- Julio César Tobar (born 1978), Colombian soccer player
- Luis Alberto Luna Tobar, (1923–2017), Ecuadorian Roman Catholic prelate
- Rafael Tobar (born 1975), Salvadoran soccer player
- Roberto Tobar (born 1978), Chilean soccer referee
- RusherKing, (born 2000 AS Thomas Tobar) Argentine rapper
- Whiquitta Tobar, American lawyer and former college basketball player
