= Caesar (surname) =

Caesar is a surname. It most commonly refers to Julius Caesar (100 BC–44 BC), a Roman general and statesman.

Other notable people with the surname include:

- Adolph Caesar (1933–1986), American actor
- Alfred Augustus Levi Caesar (1914–1995), English geographer
- Arthur Caesar (1892–1953), American screenwriter
- Bill Caesar (1899–1988), English cricketer
- Burt Caesar, British actor, broadcaster and director
- David Caesar (born 1963), Australian television director, film director and writer
- Gene Caesar (1927–1986), American writer
- Gus Caesar (born 1966), English footballer
- Hans-Joachim Caesar (1905–1990), German Bank Comptroller in Paris, 1940–44
- Imruh Bakari Caesar, British filmmaker and writer
- Irving Caesar (1895–1996), American lyricist and theatre composer
- Ivan Caesar (1967–2008), American football player
- Jimmy Caesar (1935–1998), American comedian and impressionist
- Julius Caesar (judge) (1557/8–1636), British judge and politician (MP for Reigate, Bletchingley, Windsor, Westminster, Middlesex and Maldon)
- Oakley Caesar-Su, better known as Central Cee (born 1998), British rapper and songwriter
- Pogus Caesar (born 1953), British photographer, conceptual artist, archivist, author, curator, television producer and director
- Robert Caesar (1602–1637), English lawyer and politician
- Shirley Caesar (born 1938), American singer
- Sid Caesar (1922–2014), American comedian and television personality

== See also ==
- Caesar (disambiguation), for people known by the title "Caesar"
- Matt Szczur (born 1989), American baseball player whose last name is pronounced identically to the most common English pronunciation of "Caesar"
