= Gaius Julius Caesar (disambiguation) =

Gaius Julius Caesar (100 BC – 15 March 44 BC) was a Roman general and statesman.

Gaius Julius Caesar may also refer to:

- Gaius Julius Caesar (name), a prominent name of the gens Julia from Roman Republican times
- Gaius Julius Caesar (governor of Asia) (c. 140 – 85 BC), father of Julius Caesar
- Gaius Julius Caesar Strabo "Vopiscus" (c. 131 – 87 BC)
- Gaius Julius Caesar Augustus (63 BC – AD 14), or Octavian, founder of the Roman Empire
- Gaius Caesar (20 BC – 4 AD), grandson of Augustus
- Gaius Caesar Augustus Germanicus (12 – 41 AD), better known as Caligula
