= Dmitry Lelyushenko =

Soviet general (1901–1987)

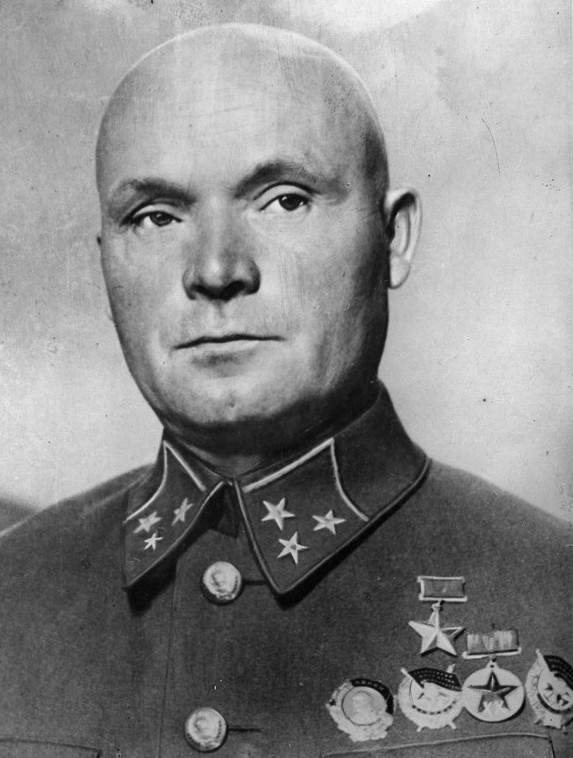
- Lelyushenko in 1942
- Born: 2 November 1901; Rostov Oblast, Russian Empire
- Died: 20 July 1987 (aged 85); Moscow, Russian SFSR, Soviet Union
- Military career
- Allegiance: Soviet Russia (1919–1922); Soviet Union (1922–1964)
- Branch: Red Army
- Service years: 1919–1964
- Commands: 21st Mechanized Corps; 1st Guards Special Rifle Corps; 5th Army; 30th Army; 1st Guards Army; 3rd Guards Army; 4th Tank Army; Transbaikal Military District
- Conflicts: Russian Civil War; Second World War; Invasion of Poland; Winter War; Eastern Front; Operation Barbarossa; Battle of Moscow; Battle at Borodino Field; Battle of Stalingrad; Operation Uranus; Operation Little Saturn; Operation Bagration; Prague offensive; Battle of Berlin
- Awards: Hero of the Soviet Union (2); Order of Lenin (6); Order of the October Revolution; Order of the Red Banner (4); Order of Suvorov (2)

Dmitry Danilovich Lelyushenko (Russian: Дмитрий Данилович Лелюшенко; (2 November [O.S. 20 October] 1901 – 20 July 1987) was a Soviet military officer and a commander in the Red Army during World War II. He rose to prominence during the first months of the Eastern Front of the Second World War, where he became a strong influence during the defence of Moscow against the German invasion. His subsequent battlefield commands were largely successful and his final actions in 1945 involved directing forces during the Red Army's attacks on both Berlin and Prague.

== Early life and military career ==
Dmitry Lelyushenko was born in 1901, in the Rostov Oblast of the Russian Empire, and was an ethnic Ukrainian. At age 17, he joined the Bolshevik forces during the Russian Civil War, serving as a cavalryman alongside Semyon Budyonny. Following the war, he became a full-time officer and completed military schooling in 1933 at the M. V. Frunze Military Academy, and went to a mechanized brigade before rising through the ranks to the rank of major and command of a tank regiment in the Moscow Military District. Lelyushenko also became a member of the CPSU from 1924.

=== Poland and the Winter War ===
As part of the Soviet-German collaboration in the invasion of Poland (see Molotov–Ribbentrop Pact), Lelyushenko, now a lieutenant-colonel, took his command, the 39th Separate Light Tank Brigade, with mainly T-26 light tanks on strength, into what was then eastern Poland (Ruthenia, Vilnius and Western Belarus). The Soviet occupation of so called Polish territory was bloodless from Lelyushenko's own experience. However shortly afterwards, in December 1939, the Brigade moved north to participate the Soviet-invasion of Finland. Now a colonel, Lelyushenko directed tank attacks against Finland's Mannerheim Line in the period February – March 1940. This was a learning experience and in addition he received the award ‘Hero of the Soviet Union’ for personal bravery. His brigade meanwhile won the Order of Lenin.

=== German invasion ===
Lelyushenko enjoyed rapid promotion in this phase of his career. Such advancement was certainly partly due to the previous Soviet Army purges, which had created a climate of opportunity, but also to the reputation he gained in Finland, where he had developed successful infantry cooperation tactics. Whatever the reason, by spring 1941 Lelyushenko held the rank of major general and was designated commander of 21st Mechanized Corps, based within the Moscow military district with which he was obviously familiar. This early war Soviet formation consisted, at the time, of 2 tank divisions and 1 motorized rifle division. Tanks on strength were all BT-7 and T-26 models; the new T-34 and KV-1 models which were later to cause German forces so much trouble were not yet available in quantity.

On 23 June 1941, the day after Germany launched Operation Barbarossa, Lelyushenko set about reorganising his command to combat the specific threats of the German invasion. Casualties began to mount as German aircraft raided his dispersal areas.

Lelyushenko began his war with an offensive at Daugavpils on 28 June, when his Corps put in a strong attack on the 56th Panzer Corps. This was noted by General von Manstein, in his book ‘Lost Victories’, where he describes the resulting German position as repeatedly becoming “quite critical” before they were able to regain control.

Overall, however, the Soviet armies were struggling. It would seem that Lelyushenko's strong character was an asset in this environment, responsible for his retaining poise and energy as the battlefield position altered constantly. Attached to the Northwestern Front, Lelyushenko earned himself the Order of the Red Star for his stubborn defence as Soviet forces nonetheless fell back 450km in 18 days.

In August, Lelyushenko was summoned by Stalin and charged with forming 22 tank brigades – a new type of formation – which were to be armed with T-34 and KV1 tanks. In this capacity he had command over numerous future Soviet ‘leading lights’ of the armoured forces, such as Rotmistrov, Katukov, Solomatin, all of whom were brigade commanders under Lelyushenko.

=== Moscow ===
By late September, the situation was critical, and in an apparent change of responsibility, Lelyushenko was now charged by the Stavka with forming a new 1st Guards Special Rifle Corps near the front line to defend the Moscow approaches and specifically the main highway from Orel. His own assessment was that rear area forces such as 36th Motorcycle Regiment and the Tula Artillery School would be best employed to move towards the German advance, collecting retreating forces as they went. This strategy was approved and following the loss of Orel itself, Mtsensk, on the Zusha river, became the ‘red line’ beyond which retreat could not occur. The newly formed Corps detrained here on 4 October 1941 in the face of the advance.

Whilst Lelyushenko's blocking force was not only a new organisational structure but one composed partly of newly raised formations, some of these were notably well-equipped. For example, Katukov's 4th Tank Brigade was fully armed with the new T-34, which was at the time arguably the best battle tank in existence.

In the following battles until 11 October, Lelyushenko succeeded in a quite vital task. Forming a corps in the face of the enemy, he eventually fought off Guderian’s Panzer Group in the southern Moscow approaches. He was personally thanked by Stalin for this action which arguably saved the Soviet capital and began to suggest a high-water mark of the overall invasion. Guderian’s memoir notes that at this stage for the Germans “the prospect of rapid… victories was fading”.

16 October saw Lelyushenko now defending the historic Borodino area along the Moscow highway. Here, he was wounded when forced into personal combat with the reserve tank brigade against a German incursion. Once recovered, during mid-November Lelyushenko was placed in charge of the 30th Army, still in front of Moscow. The Germans were held at bay during further extremely difficult fighting but by 1 December the Soviets were in a position to plan a strong winter counteroffensive. Lelyushenko commanded part of this operation, launched during full darkness on 5 December and drove his men, specifically the 371st Rifle Division, forward, as usual from an advanced position near the fighting.

By the 1941 he had helped defend Moscow from three separate directions, successfully on all occasions. The capture of the Soviet capital had arguably ceased to be a practical proposition for the enemy, whose main offensives during the following year would be directed to the south and, eventually, Stalingrad.

=== Actions at Stalingrad ===
In November 1942, after a year continuing to defend the Moscow approaches with much less difficulty than previously, Lelyushenko also went south, to take command of the 1st Guards Army. At this stage of his career he received the Order of Lenin and held the rank of lieutenant general.

The first assignment was the Army's attack as part of Operation Uranus, the encirclement operation against Paulus’s 6th Army at Stalingrad. By 23 November this was complete, Lelyushenko advancing 55 km to the west. During this period he was officially reprimanded for his habitual absence from his rear area command post, due to his insistence on attending the front in person. The following offensive codenamed Operation Little Saturn commenced on 16 December 1942 and Lelyushenko's Army, now designated 3rd Guards Army, again drove forward with 1st Guards Mechanised Corps making 100 km of ground into the enemy rear areas.

=== 1943 and 1944 – Soviet victories ===
The following 2 years were successful for forces under Lelyushenko's command. Despite not being directly involved at Kursk, they were part of the strategic offensives that followed in order to exploit the failure of the German effort. Given command of the 4th Tank Army in March 1944, his troops and tanks seized strategically valuable Kamenets-Podolsky on 26 March and trapped – for a while at least – the 1st Panzer Army.

The Soviet offensive Operation Bagration in the summer of 1944 saw Lelyushenko command the 4th Tank Army in cooperation with 3rd Guards Tank Army as the 1st Ukrainian Front (Front being the Soviet term for the largest operational grouping of forces and consisting usually of multiple armies with support units) drove forward against German Army Group Northern Ukraine. 27 July, two weeks into the offensive, these forces took Lvov and Lelyushenko's Army subsequently covered 200 km into the Vistula bridgehead by mid-August. However casualties were very high and the Army had to reequip after over 90% AFV casualties in killed or wounded. Not until the following year would they again advance.

=== Final stages of the war ===
With Soviet forces in the ascendancy, 4th Tank Army attacked in the Keltse area on 11 January 1945 as part of its Front's offensive. Driving through German defensive lines they encountered a strong armoured reserve, 24 Panzer Corps, near Maleshov. Lelyushenko managed the armoured battle that followed, in which up to 1,000 tanks were committed, defeating the German counter-attack and destroying much of the reserve involved, before ordering his forces across the Oder river. This action resulted in him winning his second Hero of the Soviet Union Award.

During the last weeks of war, Lelyushenko took his armoured command first to the suburbs of Berlin, where they assisted in the advance into the Reich capital, and subsequently to Prague where they were also involved in a city assault. This was the last combat action he saw during the war.

== Later life and death ==
Lelyushenko became an Army General in 1959, eventually retiring from the Soviet military in 1964. He was twice a recipient of the Hero of the Soviet Union (awarded on 7 April 1940 and 5 April 1945) and was also a recipient of the Hero of Czechoslovakia (awarded on 30 May 1970). He died on 20 July 1987, in Moscow, at the age of 85.

== Legacy ==
Lelyushenko seems to have cut both a stocky and quite aggressive figure, with the fashionably-shaven head of a Soviet officer combining with a demeanour that was both energetic and demanding. He was not a consensual commander or given to delegating responsibility from afar, preferring to visit the front line and make his own decisions based on his own judgement. Likewise his managerial approach was hands-on, often appearing in training areas to personally demonstrate technique to his subordinates. He was typical of many Soviet commanders in that during the Second World War, he both worked and lived in his office 24 hours a day.
