= Di Cesare =

Di Cesare or DiCesare is an Italian surname. Notable people with the surname include:

- Brent Di Cesare (born 1979), English YouTuber known by his online alias Mark Goldbridge
- Donatella Di Cesare (born 1956), Italian philosopher
- Leonardo Di Cesare (born 1968), Argentine film director
- Marco Di Cesare (born 2002), Argentine footballer
- Michelina Di Cesare (1841–1868), Italian rebel
- Pat DiCesare (born 1938), American entrepreneur
- Valerio Di Cesare (born 1983), Italian footballer

== See also ==
- De Cesare, a name
- Cesare, a name
- DiCesare Engler Productions
- Enea di Cesare Spennazzi
