= Little Caesar =

Little Caesar may refer to:

== People ==
- Ptolemy XV Philopator Philometor Caesar, nicknamed Caesarion ("Little Caesar"), last pharaoh of Egypt, son of Julius Caesar and Cleopatra
- Little Caesar (singer) (1928-1994; birth name Harry Caesar) U.S. singer
- Abe Saperstein (1902–1966), nicknamed "Little Caesar", founder of the Harlem Globetrotters
- Lil' Cease, the stage name for rap artist James Lloyd, also known as "Lil' Cesar"
- César Augusto Roriz Silva (died 2002), member of the Brazilian crime organization Primeiro Comando da Capital
- Salvatore Maranzano (1886–1931), Mafia boss whose nickname was "Little Caesar"

== Music ==
=== Bands ===
- Little Caesar (band), American hard rock band
- Little Caesar and the Consuls, Canadian rock band
- Little Caesar & the Romans, American vocal group

=== Songs ===
- "Little Caesar" (song), from the 1989 Kiss album, Hot in the Shade
- "Little Caesar," a song by Blondie from the 1982 album, The Hunter
- "Little Caesar" a protest song by Seb Lowe

== Entertainment ==
- Little Caesar, a 1929 novel by William R. Burnett
  - Little Caesar (film), a 1931 film based on the Burnett novel
- Little Caesar, a character in The Twilight Zone episode "Caesar and Me"

== Other uses ==
- Little Caesars, a pizza chain formed in 1959
- Little Caesars Arena, Detroit, Michigan, USA; a multipurpose arena for ice hockey and basketball
- Little Caesars Pizza Bowl (1997-2013) college football game

== See also ==
- Caesar (disambiguation)
- Little (disambiguation)
