= Julio Cesar Firrufino =

Spanish mathematician and engineer (1578–1651)

- Born: c. 1578 probably Seville, Spain
- Died: 9 March 1651 (aged 72–73); Madrid, Spain
- Scientific career
- Fields: Mathematics, artillery
- Notable students: Luis Carducho

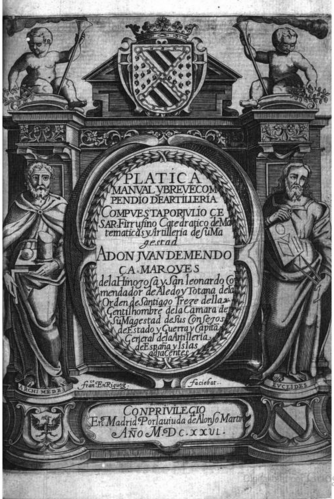
Front page of Platica (1626)

Julio Cesar Firrufino or Ferrufino (16th century) was an engineer and mathematician who had a chair in mathematics in Madrid from 1604 to 1650.

== Life and work ==
He was the son of Julian Firrufino (ca 1535–1604), born in Alessandria (Duchy of Milan) who had also a chair in Geometry and Artillery granted by the king of Spain. However, we know few biographical data of Julio Cesar, his son. Only from a document dated 1644, we know he was 66 years old, so we can suppose he was born in 1578, when his father had a chair of Naval Artillery in the Casa de Contratación and, probably, he was born in Sevilla.

In 1600 he was assistant of the Spanish minister of Artillery and from 1604, after the death of his father, he was appointed to a chair on Mathematics and Fortification, after the approval of Andrés García de Céspedes and João Baptista Lavanha who examined him. He was in charge of the chair until 1650, one year before his death; in this date he was replaced by his student Luis Carduchi, member of a family of old friends of Firrufino.

In 1626 he published Plática Manual y Breve Compendio de Artillería, which was an abstract of a treatise of artillery that he was not allowed to publish by political reasons.

In 1638 he was accused by fraud in the production of 66 artillery guns in Sevilla; for this reason he was imprisoned during some time in 1644.

In 1648 was published his most important work: El perfecto artillero, which is an encyclopedic treatise, but not much original, based in Tartaglia ideas.

== Bibliography ==
- Capel Saez, Horacio; Sanchez, Joan-Eugeni; Moncada, Omar (1988). De Palas a Minerva: la formación científica y la estructura institucional de los ingenieros militares en el siglo XVIII (in Spanish). Ediciones del Serbal i CSIC. ISBN 84-00-06829-7.
- Díaz Moreno, Felix (2000). "Teórica y práctica del arte de la guerra en el siglo XVII hispano. Julio César Firrufino y la artillería". Anales de Historia del Arte (in Spanish). 10: 169–205. ISSN 0214-6452.
- Navarro Loidi, Juan (1997). "El movimiento de los proyectiles y los escritos de los militares españoles del siglo XVII". In Georgina Blanes i Nadal, Lluís Garrigós i Oltra (coords.) (ed.). Actes de les IV trobades d'història de la ciència i de la tècnica (in Spanish). Societat Catalana d'Història de la Ciència i de la Tècnica. pp. 595–608. ISBN 84-7283-391-7.
- Vicente Maroto, M. Isabel (2003). "Las escuelas de artillería en los siglos XVI y XVII". Quaderns d'història de l'enginyeria (in Spanish). 5: 1–9. ISSN 1135-934X.
