= Cezary Kaliszyk =

Researcher, Ph.D. Radboud Universiteit Nijmegen 2009, ORCID ID = 0000–0002-8273-6059

Cezary Kaliszyk (born 1981) is a Polish computer scientist and professor of theoretical computer science at the University of Melbourne. His research focuses on automated reasoning, formal mathematics, proof assistants, and the application of artificial intelligence and machine learning to mathematical reasoning.

== Education ==
Kaliszyk studied computer science and mathematics at the University of Warsaw. He received a PhD in computer science from Radboud University Nijmegen in 2009 and completed his habilitation in computer science at the University of Innsbruck in 2016.

== Career ==
Kaliszyk held postdoctoral positions at the Technical University of Munich and the University of Tsukuba before joining the University of Innsbruck in 2012. In 2024, he joined the University of Melbourne as a professor of theoretical computer science.

In 2016, Kaliszyk received a European Research Council Starting Grant for the SMART project (Strong Modular proof Assistance: Reasoning across Theories). The project investigated automated proof assistance and methods for combining automated reasoning with machine learning. Kaliszyk was involved in EuroProofNet, the European Research Network on Formal Proofs, and led its working group on machine learning in proofs. In 2025, Kaliszyk received an AI for Math grant from Renaissance Philanthropy for research on artificial intelligence systems for mathematical and symbolic reasoning.
