= Cesare Ragazzi =

Italian businessman (1941–2024)

Cesare Ragazzi (22 August 1941 – 27 December 2024) was an Italian businessman, inventor and television personality from Bazzano.

== Life and career ==
As a young man, he was part of the band called "I Vagabondi", in which he held the role of guitarist and second voice. At the end of the sixties, Cesare Ragazzi began to lose his hair and therefore began to study the problem of baldness. He managed to invent the trichological prosthesis, i.e. a non-invasive transplant that was applied directly to the scalp, through a special tape: he himself called it "a hairpiece of natural hair". His company, founded in 1968 and specialized in solutions for baldness, could also boast Lucio Dalla among its customers.

He was the third Italian businessman to advertise his company with his own image, after Dr. Nicola Ciccarelli and Lamberto Gancia. Due to a successful advertising campaign, starting from the eighties, he was a guest on several television programmes, including Quelli che il calcio, Passaparola, Torno sabato and three by Giorgio Panariello. The advertising slogan used in the TV commercials ("Hello... I'm Cesare Ragazzi!"), became a catchphrase.

In October 2009, the company he founded was declared bankrupt by the Court of Bologna.

Ragazzi died at his home in Bologna, on the evening of 27 December 2024, at the age of 83.
