= Cesar van Loo =

French painter

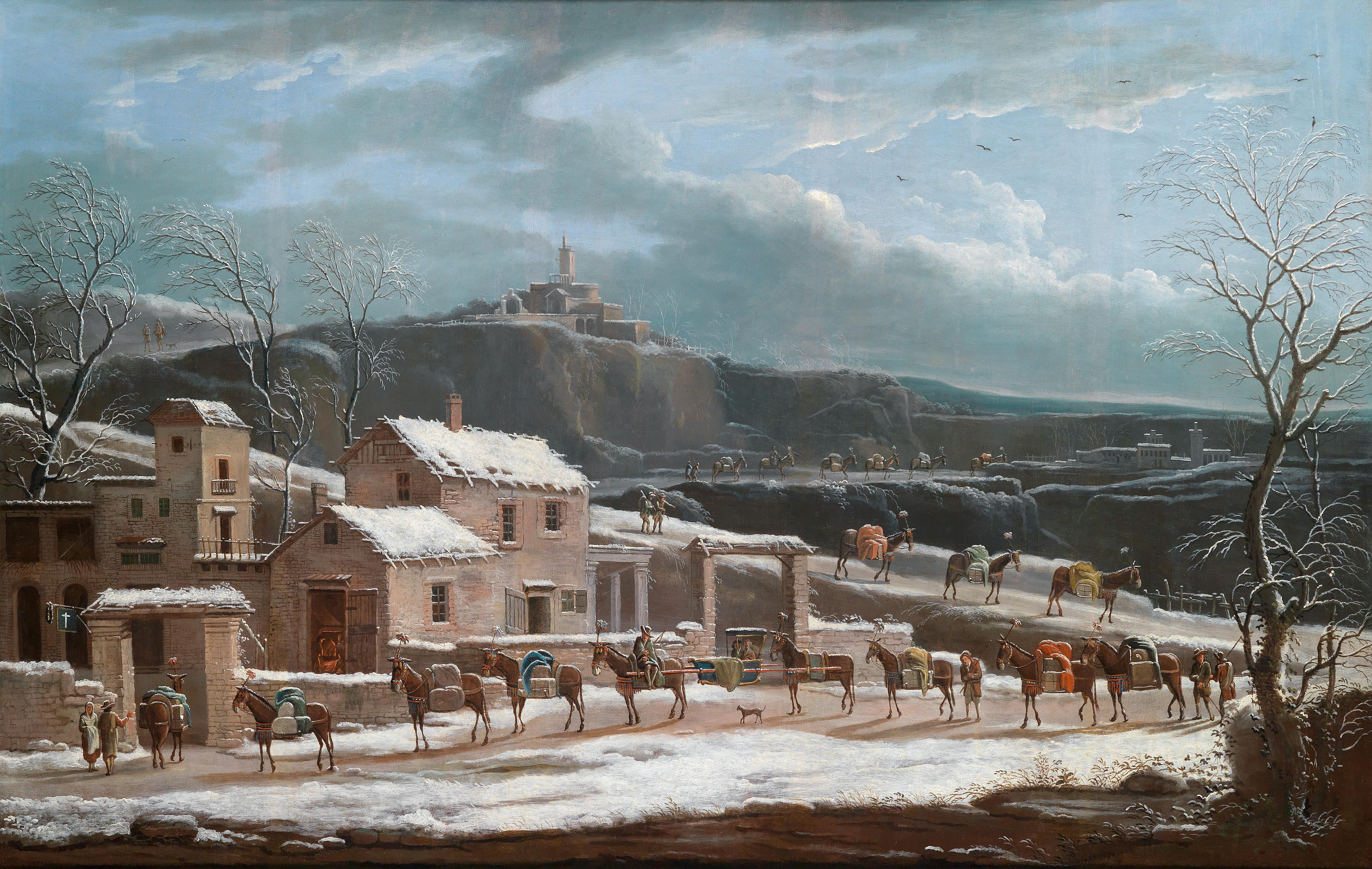
Horse caravan stopping at a village in winter

Cesar van Loo (1743 – 1821), was a French painter.

== Biography ==
He was born in Paris as Jules César Denis van Loo, but signed his paintings "Cesar van Loo". He is known for winter landscapes. He died in Paris.
