= Borodino, Palekhsky District, Ivanovo Oblast =

Borodino Бородино
- Village
- Location within Ivanovo Oblast Location within Russia
- Coordinates: 56°47′N 42°04′E
- Country: Russia
- Region: Ivanovo Oblast
- District: Palekhsky District
- Time zone: UTC+3:00

Borodino (Russian: Бородино) is a rural locality (a village) in Palekhsky District, Ivanovo Oblast, Russia. Population: 200 (2010 census);

== Geography ==
This rural locality is located 13 kilometres (8.1 mi) from Palekh (the district's administrative centre), 71 kilometres (44 mi) from Ivanovo (capital of Ivanovo Oblast) and 295 kilometres (183 mi) from Moscow. Levino is the nearest rural locality.
