= Cesare Battisti =

Cesare Battisti may refer to:

- Cesare Battisti (politician) (1875–1916), Italian politician
- Cesare Battisti (militant) (born 1954), former member of the Armed Proletarians for Communism in Italy
- Italian destroyer Cesare Battisti, in service 1927–1941
