= Cesar =

Cesar or César may refer to:

== Arts and entertainment ==
- César (film), a 1936 French romantic drama
- César (play), a play by Marcel Pagnolt

== Fictional characters ==
Notable fictional characters

- Cesar, a character in the video game Dragon Quest Heroes II.
- Cesar Torres from the web series The Mandela Catalogue.

== Places ==
- Cesar, Portugal
- Cesar Department, Colombia
- Cesar River, in Colombia
- Cesar River, Chile
- César (restaurant), a restaurant in New York City

== People ==
- César (name), including a list of people with the given name and surname
- César (footballer, born 1956) (1956–2024), Brazilian football forward
- César (footballer, born 1974), Brazilian football midfielder and defender
- César (footballer, born May 1979), Brazilian football defender and coach
- César (footballer, born July 1979), Brazilian football winger
- César (footballer, born 1992), Brazilian football goalkeeper
- César (footballer, born 1995), Brazilian football goalkeeper
- César (sculptor), César Baldaccini (1921–1998), French sculptor

== Other uses ==
- César (grape), an ancient red wine grape from northern Burgundy
- César Awards, the national film award of France
- César Awards, by The Good Hotel Guide
- French ship César, the name of two ships
- César (1802 ship), a French brig later captured by the Royal Navy
- Recife Center for Advanced Studies and Systems (CESAR), in Brazil
- Cesar, a brand of dog food by Mars Inc.

== See also ==
- Caesar (disambiguation)
- Cesare, a name
