= J. C. Strauss =

American photographer (1857–1924)

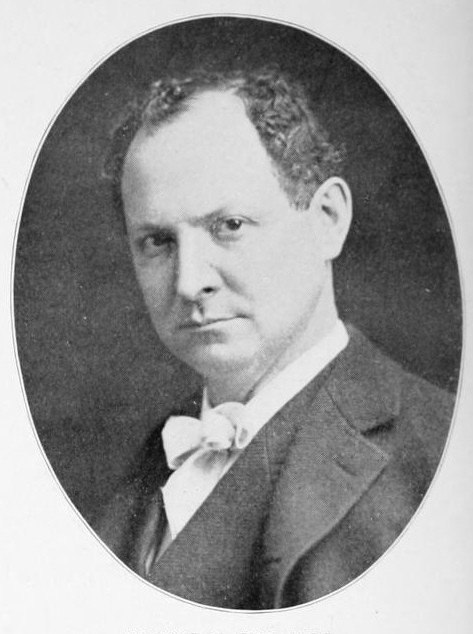
Strauss, circa 1900

Julius Caesar Strauss (July 1857 - 1924), known professionally as J. C. Strauss, was an American photographer who was active in St. Louis, Missouri, at the turn of the 20th century.

Born in Cleveland, Ohio, the son of a poor Bavarian-born tailor, he left home and sneaked into St. Louis in 1876 and opened a photography studio in 1879. By the 1890s, he had built a gallery. Although he was willing to experiment with different lighting and backgrounds, he insisted upon rigidly posed portraits.

Photographer Alfred Stieglitz from New York City eventually took over the style and reputation of Strauss who continued to create pictures that looked more like paintings. From the time of the St. Louis World's Fair until his death, Strauss' studio was a local tourist attraction.
