= Caesar, Zimbabwe =

Village in Zimbabwe

Coordinates: 17°19′19″S 30°07′02″E

Caesar is a village in the Mazowe West District located within the province of Mashonaland South, Zimbabwe. It is situated in the Great Dyke about 12 km (7.5 mi) south of the Mutorashanga Pass. According to the 1982 Population Census, the village had a population of 2,674. The village grew up around the Caesar Mine which is a chromite mine.
