= Cesar River, Chile =

Cesar River
- Location within Chile

Location
- Country: Chile

Physical characteristics
- Mouth
  - coordinates: 44°08′37″S 72°28′12″W

Basin features
- River system: Palena River

The Cesar River (Rio Cesar) is a river in southern Chile, a right tributary of the Rio Risopatrón in the Palena River drainage. It enters the Rio Risopatrón north of Lake Risopatrón.
