= Julio César Salas Municipality =

Julio César Salas Municipality Municipio Julio César Salas
- Municipality
- Flag Seal

- Location in Mérida

- Location in Venezuela
- Coordinates: 9°14′43″N 70°56′39″W
- Country: Venezuela
- State: Mérida

Government
  - Mayor: Gerardo Peña Santiago (UNT)

Area
  - Total: 202 km^{2} (78 sq mi)

Population (2007)
  - Total: 15,300
  - Density: 75.7/km^{2} (196/sq mi)
- Time zone: UTC−4 (VET)
- Area code(s): 0271
- Website: Official website

The Julio César Salas Municipality is one of the 23 municipalities (municipios) that makes up the Venezuelan state of Mérida and, according to a 2007 population estimate by the National Institute of Statistics of Venezuela, the municipality has a population of 15,300. The town of Arapuey is the shire town of the Julio César Salas Municipality.

== History ==
Its origins date back to 1915 when the area was designated as Arapuey Village. With the construction of the Pan-American Highway, it gained importance and became Julio César Salas Foreign Municipality, linked to the former Miranda District (today Miranda Municipality). Then, in 1988, it became Julio César Salas Autonomous Municipality. On January 15, 1992, the administration of Palmira Parish of Miranda Municipality was transferred to Julio César Salas Municipality. Historically, the northern territory has remained in dispute with Zulia State which sees it as an integral part.

== Geography ==
It is the northernmost municipality of Mérida. It is divided into two regions, a plateau formed by its proximity to Lake Maracaibo and another mountainous area located in the Venezuelan Andes. Elevations range from 80m in the north to 2,000m in the south, in the Andean foothills. The north is in a tropical moist forest biome, and the rest of the municipality is a submontane moist forest. Temperatures vary between 25 °C and 32.5 °C and average annual precipitation is 1,000mm. The main waterways are the Alguacil, Arapuey and Quince rivers.

== Demographics ==
The Julio César Salas Municipality, according to a 2007 population estimate by the National Institute of Statistics of Venezuela, has a population of 15,300 (up from 12,569 in 2000). This amounts to 1.8% of the state's population. The municipality's population density is 75.7 inhabitants per square kilometre (196/sq mi).

== Government ==
The mayor of the Julio César Salas Municipality is Silvio Luis Torres Vasquez, elected on October 31, 2004, with 50% of the vote. He replaced Antonio Vielma shortly after the elections. The municipality is divided into two parishes; Julio César Salas and Palmira.

== See also ==
- Arapuey
- Mérida
- Municipalities of Venezuela
