= HMS Caesar =

Four ships of the British Royal Navy have been named HMS Caesar (or HMS Cæsar), after the Roman general and dictator Julius Caesar.

- Caesar was ordered as a 74-gun third rate from Plymouth Dockyard in 1777, but construction was cancelled in 1783.
- HMS Caesar (1793) was an 80-gun third rate launched in 1793, used as an army depot after 1814, and broken up 1821.
- HMS Caesar (1853) was a 90-gun screw-propelled second rate launched in 1853 and sold in 1870.
- HMS Caesar (1896) was a Majestic-class battleship launched in 1896 and sold 1921.
- HMS Caesar (R07) was a C-class destroyer launched in 1944 and broken up in 1967.

== See also ==
- HMS Cesar - mercantile brig launched in 1802 that the French Navy purchased at Bordeaux in 1803. The Royal Navy captured her in July 1806 and took her into service, but she was wrecked in early 1807.
- Italian battleship Giulio Cesare, an Italian Navy battleship named after the same person.
