= Caesar (given name) =

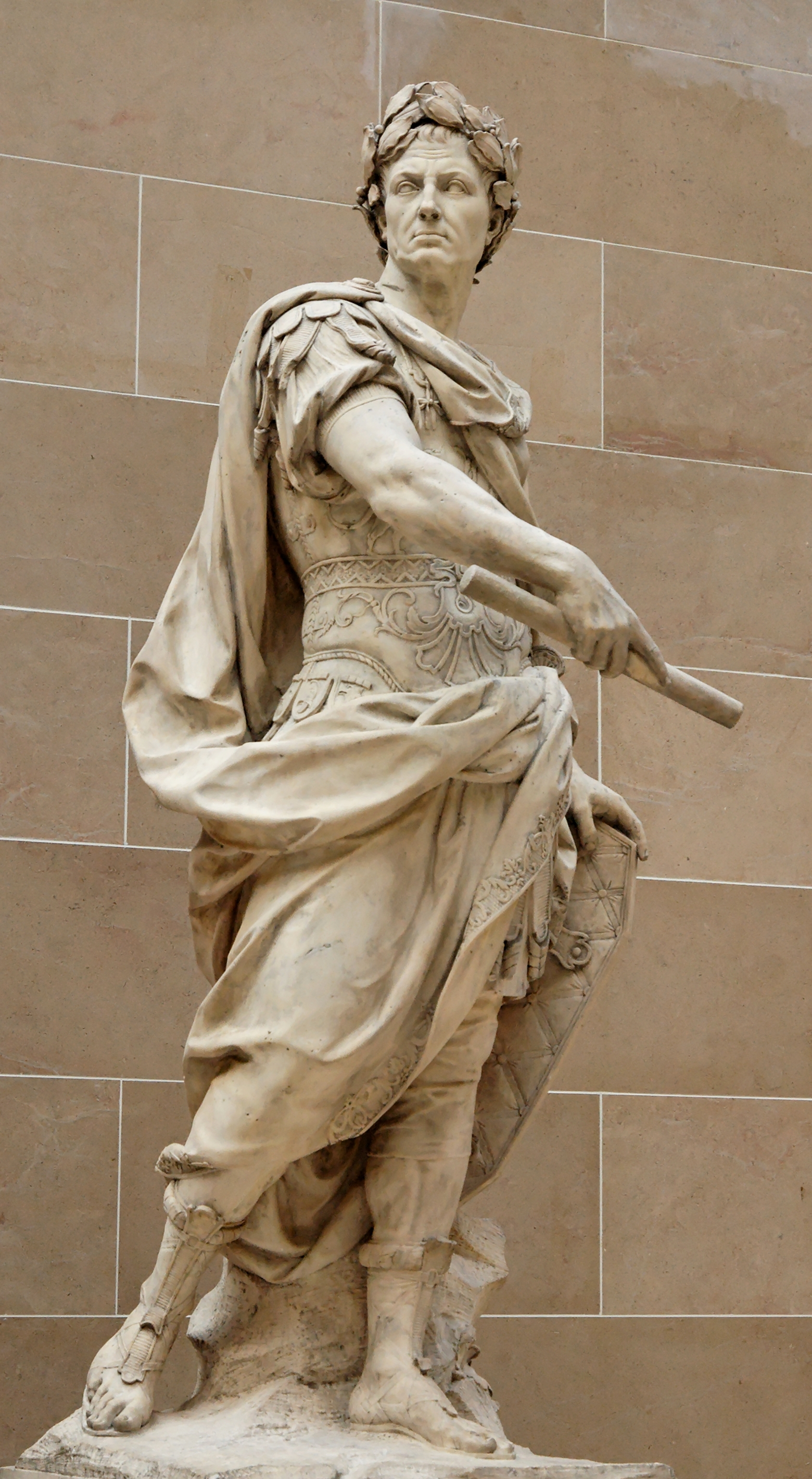
- Julius Caesar
- Pronunciation: English: /ˈsiːzər/ SEE-zər; Classical Latin: [ˈkae̯sar]
- Gender: Male

Origin
- Origin: Latin: Caesar
- Meaning: Short hair (disputed), nickname
- Region of origin: Roman Republic, Europe

Other names
- Related names: César, Cesar, Cèsar, Zésar, Cesare, Sezer

Caesar is a masculine given name. Notable people with the name include:

- Caesar Bacarella (born 1975), American racing driver
- Caesar Cardini (1896–1956), Italian hotel owner, restaurateur, and chef in Tijuana, Mexico
- Caesar E. Farah (1929–2009), American scholar and historian
- Caesar Korolenko (1933–2020), Russian psychiatrist
- Caesar Lvovich Kunikov (1909–1943), officer in the Soviet Union
- "Caesar" Li Mao, member of Mandopop boy band Top Combine
- Caesar Rodney (1728–1784), signer of the American Declaration of Independence 1776
- Takeshi Caesar (born 1955), Japanese kickboxer
- Caesar von Hofacker (1896–1944), member of the German Resistance

== See also ==
- Caesar (disambiguation)
- Cesar (disambiguation)
