= Donald H. DeCesare =

American politician

Member of the New Hampshire House of Representatives from the Rockingham 5th district
- In office 1974–1976

Personal details
- Born: November 14, 1924
- Died: June 16, 2010 (aged 85)
- Party: Republican

Donald H. DeCesare (November 14, 1924 – June 16, 2010) was an American politician and pharmacist. He served as a Republican member for the Rockingham 5th district of the New Hampshire House of Representatives.
