= Battle at Borodino Field =

Smaller battle in the greater Battle of Moscow, 1941

- Part of the Battle of Moscow
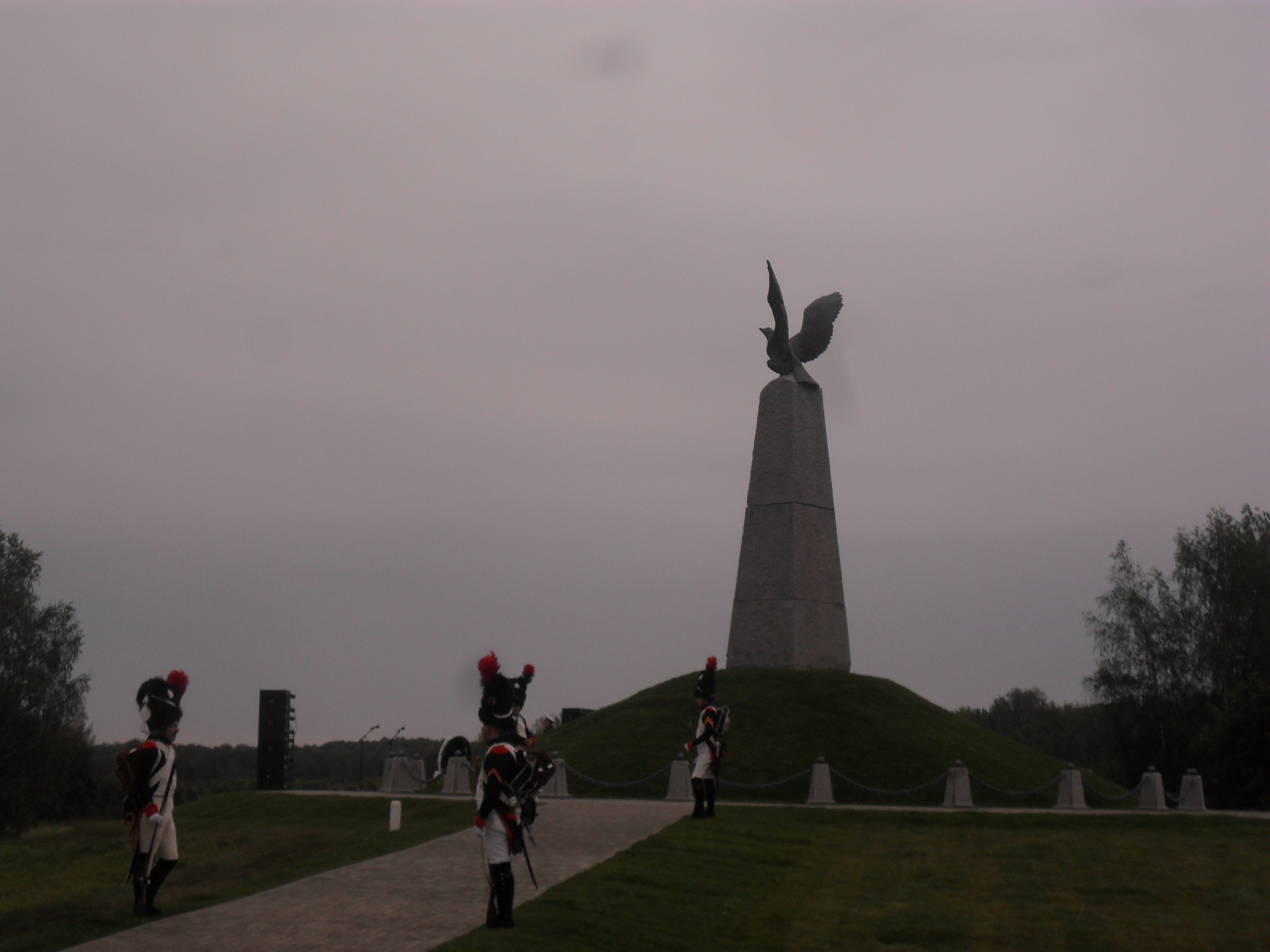
- Monument to the " Dead of the Great Army" on the Shevardinsky Redoubt
Date	13 October 1941 – 18 January 1942
Location	Borodino, Russian SFSR 55°30′31″N 35°49′16″E
Result	German victory in October; Soviet victory in January

Belligerents
Germany	Soviet Union

Commanders and leaders
Günther von Kluge	Dmitry Lelyushenko

Strength
2nd SS Division Das Reich; 10th Panzer Division; 18th Panzer Brigade; 19th Panzer Brigade	32nd Rifle Division; 82nd Motor Rifle Division; 36th Motorcycle Regiment; 509th Anti-Tank Regiment

The Battle at Borodino Field was a part of the Battle of Moscow, on the Eastern Front of World War II. While referring to the battle in Russian, the Borodino Field is actually more commonly applied rather than just Borodino, cf. Georgy Zhukov ("...this division [32nd] was forced to cross the arms with the enemy on the Borodino Field...").

At noon on 13 October 1941, German Junkers and Messerschmitt aircraft appeared over the Borodino Field, site of the climactic 1812 French-Russian clash. On 16 October, severe fighting broke out in the center of Borodino Field. Subsequently, the Germans managed to take the field. The Spaso-Borodinsky Monastery was burnt and the Borodino Museum suffered damage. Borodino Field was freed by the 82nd Soviet Rifle Division during the Russian counter offensive.

Reportedly, Col. Victor Polosukhin of the Red Army, whose unit was on Borodino Field, looked in on the museum shortly before it was damaged. He signed the visitors' guestbook and under "Purpose of Visit" wrote "I have come to defend the battlefield".

== See also ==
- Battle of Moscow (film)

== Sources ==
- За нами Москва. Бородино. 1941. Воспоминания. М., 2007 (memoirs and letter extracts of Soviet 5th Army soldiers)
