= Jimmy Caesar =

American comedian and impressionist

- Caesar in Rowan & Martin's Laugh-In, 1970
- Born: Caesar Pasquale Tronolone; May 5, 1935; Buffalo, New York, U.S.
- Died: October 2, 1998 (aged 63); Las Vegas, Nevada, U.S.
- Occupations: Comedian, impressionist

Caesar Pasquale Tronolone (May 5, 1935 – October 2, 1998) was an American comedian and impressionist. He was best known for his impersonations of actors John Wayne, Stan Laurel and Boris Karloff, and the comedy duo Martin and Lewis. He was dubbed as "Buffalo's Own Great Comedian" by the The Buffalo News.

Caesar died on October 2, 1998, of lung cancer in Las Vegas, Nevada, at the age of 63.
