= Borodino-class motorship =

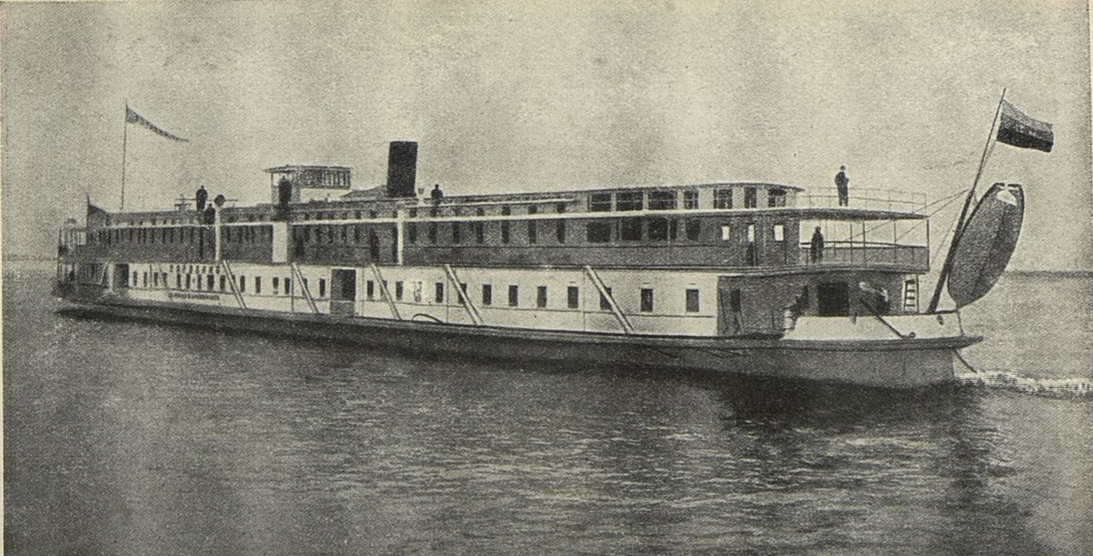
- Borodino motorship, 1914

Class overview
- Builders: Kolomenskiy yard
- Operators: Caucasus and Mercury
- Built: 1911–1917
- Planned: 14
- Completed: 11
- Canceled: 3
- Active: 0

General characteristics
- Length: 92.9 m (304 ft 9 in) o/a; 89.9 m (294 ft 11 in) p/p
- Beam: 9.8 m (32 ft 2 in)
- Draught: 2 m (6 ft 7 in)
- Propulsion: 2 × 600 hp (447 kW) 6-cylinder diesel engines
- Speed: 23 km/h (14 mph)
- Capacity: 500 passengers, 320 tons of cargo

Borodino class motorship was a class of Russian river passenger ships. The series is named after Borodino village, and the ships themselves are notable for their size, power, and use in the Russo-Japanese War and the Bolshevik Revolution.

== Origins ==
The Borodino class were some of the first screw ships for passengers on the various rivers in Russia. The ships were built between 1911 and 1917 at the Kolomenskiy shipyard for Caucasus and Mercury primarily for passenger service, although some also performed postal work.

== Specifications ==
The ships each had a pair of six cylinder diesel engines, and had double decks. Capable of carrying 500 passengers and up to 300 tons of cargo, they were not small paddle boats, but large ships, over 300 feet long over 30 feet wide.

== History of the series ==
During the Bolshevik Civil War, the Borodino class ships were used as troop transports in service with the Red Army. One of the ships was temporarily the flagship of an ad-hoc war fleet, mostly of other retrofitted river craft and fishing vessels.

In World War II a few of the ships were used to evacuate people and wounded soldiers from Stalingrad, but most were tasked with carrying valuable equipment and material back away from the German front towards the interior of the Soviet Union.

After 1960, the remaining ships not destroyed by war were rebuilt and refurbished, and operated by the Volga Shipping Company.

== Ships ==
Built	Original Name	Renamed	Fate
1911	Borodino	Tovarishch Raskolnikov (1939); Mikoyan (1948)	Scrapped, 1997
1912	Krasnoarmeets	Feldmarshal Kutuzov (1918)	Sunk, 1942
1912	Pamyat Tovarishch Markina	Bagration (1919)	In Crimea, 2005
1912	Semnadtsatyy God	Dvenadtsatyy God (1918); God Oktyabrskoy Revolyutsyi (1936)	Burnt, 1978
1912	Ilyich	Tsesarevich Aleksey (1917); Inzhener Raymund Koreyvo (1918); Krasnaya Latviya (1929); Mikhail Tomskiy (1936)	Sunk, 1942
1913	Uritskiy	Tsargrad (1920)	Scrapped, 1991
1914	25oe Oktyabrya	Tsar Mikhail (1917); Kiev (1918)	Burnt, 1978
1914	Parizhskaya Kommuna	Ioann Groznyy (1914); Petrograd (1919); Fridrikh Adler (1919); Pamyat Parizhskoy Kommuny (1920)	Burnt, 1999
1915	Karl Libknekht	Korol Albert (1918)	Sunk, 1943
1915	Lenin	Velikiy Knyaz Nikolay Nikolaevich (1917); Erzerum (1918)	Burnt, 1920
1917	Akademik Timiryazev	Vadim Arshaulov (1919); Lev Trotskiy (1929)	Sunk, 1942
