= Caesar (1810 ship) =

British merchant ship (1810–1825)

United Kingdom
- Name: Caesar
- Namesake: Julius Caesar
- Owner: 1810: H. Turner, or Fowler & Co.; 1816:Taylor
- Builder: Wells, Wigram & Green at Blackwall.
- Cost: Cost £23 per ton = £13,908 + £32 extra
- Yard number: 145
- Launched: 1 September 1810
- Fate: Last listed in 1825 (Note: Two sources conflate this Caesar with Caesar (1825 ship).)

General characteristics
- Tons burthen: 604 67/94, 626, or 626 41/94, or 627, or 637 (bm)
- Complement: 1810:40; 1812:50
- Armament: 1810:20 × 18&12-pounder carronades; 1810:18 × 18-pounder carronades + 2 × 9-pounder guns; 1812:20 × 18&12-pounder carronades

Caesar was launched in 1810 on the Thames River. She sailed first as a West Indiaman, and then after 1814 to the East Indies under a license from the British East India Company (EIC). In 1817 she repatriated from Batavia to London Lord William Amherst and the officers and crew of HMS Alceste. Caesar was last listed in 1825.

== Career ==
Caesar enters Lloyd's Register in 1810 with J. Fowler, master, Fowler & Co., owner, and trade London–Jamaica. Captain Jonathon Fowler acquired a letter of marque on 10 November 1810.

On 13 October 1812 Captain James Shand acquired a letter of marque. (Note: He had been master of Caesar, also a West Indiaman, when she wrecked off the South Foreland in late 1810.) Lloyd's Register for 1813 shows Caesar's master changing from Fowler to Shand. In 1814 M. Fowler replaced J. Shand.

The Register of Shipping for 1816 shows Caesar's master changing from Shand to Taylor, her owner from Fowlgen to C.H. Turner, and her trade from London–Jamaica to Bombay. The EIC had lost its monopoly on the trade between England and India and Caesar acquired a licence from the EIC to trade with India. Captain J. Taylor sailed from England in December 1816, bound for Fort William, India.

In 1817 Lord Amherst was returning on HMS Alceste from his embassy to China. On 18 February Alceste grounded on one of the many hidden reefs in the Java Sea. She was wrecked, and first Lord Amherst and his party, and then the rest of Alceste's officers and crew reached Batavia. Lord Amherst then engaged Caesar, which was at Batavia, to take all the survivors back to England.

Caesar sailed on 17 April with Lord Amherst, his party, and the officers and men of Alceste. Several events marked the voyage. (Different sources give inconsistent dates for arrival and departure dates for Caesar's stops on her way home.)

On 5 May, while Caesar was about 200 miles south of Mauritius a fire broke out in the spirit room. Aceste's men. especially her gunner, were instrumental in putting it out. Caesar arrived at Simon's Bay on 27 May.

Caesar sailed again in company with HMS Conqueror for St Helena on 11 June. Before leaving Batavia, Caesar had also loaded two unusual passengers, an orangutan and a python. Several accounts of the voyage mention the feeding of the python, and its dissection after its death on the way to St Helena. The orangutan eventually had free run of the ship and arrived safely in England.

Caesar arrived at St Helena on 27 June. On 28 June Lord Amherst, Captain Maxwell of Alceste, and Mr. Lynn, her surgeon, met with Napoleon Bonaparte. They reported an amicable discussion. (Note: Another account puts the date of the meeting as 3 July.)

On 29 June, or 3 July, Caesar left St Helena. She arrived at Ascension Island on 7 July. She stayed less than a day, stopping only long enough to load eight large turtles. Caesar arrived at Spithead on 16 August.

== Fate ==
Caesar continued to trade with the East Indies on her return from repatriating Lord Amherst and the crew of Alceste. She was last listed in the Register of Shipping in 1824, and in Lloyd's Register in 1825 with J. Taylor, master, Taylor, owner, and trade London–Bengal.

It is highly likely that in 1826 she became Borodino.
