= Borodino, Volgograd Oblast =

Borodino Бородино
- Khutor
- Location within Volgograd Oblast Location within Russia
- Coordinates: 48°53′N 44°07′E
- Country: Russia
- Region: Volgograd Oblast
- District: Gorodishchensky District
- Time zone: UTC+4:00

Borodino (Russian: Бородино́) is a rural locality (a khutor) in Rossoshenskoye Rural Settlement, Gorodishchensky District, Volgograd Oblast, Russia. The population was 73 as of 2010. There are 3 streets.

== Geography ==
Borodino is located in steppe, 41 km northwest of Gorodishche (the district's administrative centre) by road. Stepnoy is the nearest rural locality.
