= Giulio Cesare (disambiguation) =

Giulio Cesare (Italian, 'Julius Caesar'), is an opera by Handel first performed in 1724.

Giulio Cesare may also refer to:

== People ==
- Giulio Cesare da Varano (1434-1502), ruler of Camerino.
- Giulio Cesare della Scala (1484–1558), Italian scholar and physician
- Giulio Cesare Martinengo (c. 1568 – 1613), Italian composer and teacher
- Giulio Cesare la Galla (1576–1624), Italian professor of philosophy
- Giulio Cesare Vanini, pen name of Lucilio Vanini (1585–1619), Italian philosopher, physician and free-thinker

== Ships ==
- Italian battleship Giulio Cesare, 1911–1949
- SS Giulio Cesare, an Italian ocean liner 1923–1944
- MS Giulio Cesare, an Italian ocean liner 1950–1973

== See also ==
- Cesare (disambiguation)
- Julius Caesar (disambiguation)
