= Borodino, Perm Krai =

Borodino Бородино
- Village
- Location within Perm Krai Location within Russia
- Coordinates: 57°34′N 57°26′E
- Country: Russia
- Region: Perm Krai
- District: Beryozovsky District
- Time zone: UTC+5:00

Borodino (Russian: Бородино) is a rural locality (a village) in Klyapovskoye Rural Settlement, Beryozovsky District, Perm Krai, Russia. The population was 7 as of 2010.

== Geography ==
It is located 7.5 km south-east from Beryozovka.
