= Borodino, Vyaznikovsky District, Vladimir Oblast =

Borodino Бородино
- Village
- Location within Vladimir Oblast Location within Russia
- Coordinates: 56°05′N 42°10′E
- Country: Russia
- Region: Vladimir Oblast
- District: Vyaznikovsky District
- Time zone: UTC+3:00

Borodino (Russian: Бородино) is a rural locality (a village) in Paustovskoye Rural Settlement, Vyaznikovsky District, Vladimir Oblast, Russia. The population was 14 as of 2010.

== Geography ==
Borodino is located 22 km south of Vyazniki (the district's administrative centre) by road. Uspensky Pogost is the nearest rural locality.
