= Caesar (1825 ship) =

United Kingdom
- Name: Caesar
- Namesake: Julius Caesar
- Owner: 1825:Johnson & Maeburn
- Builder: Thames River
- Launched: c.January 1825
- Fate: Wrecked 1833
- Notes: At least one source conflates this Caesar with the earlier Caesar.

General characteristics
- Class & type: 620, or 621 [(bm)

Caesar was launched in 1825 on the Thames River. She sailed between England and the East Indies under a license from the British East India Company (EIC). In 1832-33 she made one voyage under charter to the EIC. Later in 1833 she again sailed to India and wrecked.

== Career ==
In November 1824 an advertisement appeared in Oriental Herald and Journal of General Literature for the ship Caesar, of 700 tons (bm), to be launched in January 1824 and to sail in March for Madras. The advertisement also stated that Caesar was "built expressly for the conveyance of Passengers, having the moulds of a Frigate". She would also carry a surgeon.

Caesar enters Lloyd's Register in 1826 with T. O. Watt, master, Johnson, owner, and trade London–Calcutta. Captain Thomas A. Watt was Caesar's first master, and in her he made five voyages. He died in 1834.

Caesar left Deal on 20 June 1825 on her maiden voyage, bound for the Cape of Good Hope, Madras, and Bengal. She was at Madeira on 15 July, and the Cape on 24 September. She arrived at Bengal on 23 November.

EIC voyage: Captain Henry Thompson sailed from The Downs on 12 July 1832, bound for Madras and Bengal. Caesar reached Madras on 24 October and arrived at Calcutta on 10 November. Homeward bound, she left Bengal on 10 January 1833, reached Saint Helena on 15 March, and arrived at The Downs on 2 May.

The Register of Shipping for 1833 shows Caesar's master changing from Thompson to T. Surden, and her trade from London–Calcutta to London–Madras.

== Fate ==
Caesar, Surflen, master, was sailing from London to India when she wrecked on 9 October 1833 on Grand River Reef, Mauritius. She had intended to replenish her supply of water. Her passengers and crew were saved, as was the greater part of her stores and cargo, though in damaged state. On 28 October she was sold for £2600 for breaking up.
