= Caesar (1800 ship) =

UK ship in the West Indies trade

Great Britain
- Name: Caesar
- Namesake: Julius Caesar
- Owner: 1800:Dale; 1810:A. Henry
- Builder: Brent, Thames River
- Launched: 1800
- Fate: Wrecked 8 February 1810

General characteristics
- Class & type: 581, 600, or 605, or 606 (bm)
- Complement: 1800:60; 1803:40; 1807:40
- Armament: 1800: 24 × 12- & 3-pounder guns; 1803: 16 × 12-pounder guns; 1807: 16 × 12-pounder guns

Caesar was launched in 1800 on the Thames River. She spent her short career as a West Indiaman, sailing between London and Jamaica until she wrecked in 1810.

Caesar entered Lloyd's Register in 1800 with J. Bruce, master, R. Dale, owner, and trade London–Jamaica. James Bunce acquired a letter of marque for Cæsar on 22 September 1800. The size of her crew and the number of guns suggests that she may initially have been a privateer.

Captain John Fowler acquired a letter of marque for Caesar on 15 December 1803, and Captain James Shand acquired one on 27 January 1807.

The Register of Shipping for 1810 showed Caesar's master as Shand, her owner as A. Henry, and her trade as London–Jamaica. The entry for her also carried the notation "LOST".

Caesar was wrecked on 8 February 1810 off the South Foreland as she was returning to London from Jamaica.
