= Borodino (1826 ship) =

Ship

History

United Kingdom
- Name: Caesar
- Builder: Thames
- Launched: 1810
- Renamed: Borodino (1825)
- Fate: Last listed 1833

General characteristics
- Tons burthen: 600, or 609, or 615, or 618, or 626, or 639 (bm)
- Propulsion: Sail

Borodino was almost surely launched as Caesar (1810 ship). Borodino first appeared in Lloyd's Register (LR) in 1826, but with launch year 1810, and launch location "River," i.e., the Thames. In 1828 she transported convicts to New South Wales from Cork. She was last listed in 1833.

== Origins ==
"Burrodino" first appeared in LR in 1826 with Morrosof, master, and Hill & Co., owner. The entry gave her origin as the Thames, and her build year as 1812. The build year was corrected to 1810 in subsequent volumes. Neither LR nor the Register of Shipping (RS) has any vessel named Borodino before 1813. The only vessel built on the Thames in 1810 of about 600 tons (bm) was Caesar. In fact, there was no vessel built on the Thames of that size between 1804 and 1813, other than East Indiamen (EIC) built for the British East India Company. There is no record of any EIC ship being renamed Borodino. Furthermore, Caesar was last listed in LR in 1825, and there is no record of her having been wrecked, condemned, or been broken up, or having foundered. Lastly, the Battle of Borodino took place in 1812. It is highly improbably that a British vessel built on the Thames in 1810 would have been named for an obscure Russian village prior to 1812.

== Career ==
The RS for 1828 showed Borodino's master changing from Manusof to Mentrup and her trade from London–Petersburg to London–New South Wales. She also had undergone a large repair in 1826.

Convict transport (1828): Captain Richard Mentrup sailed from Cork on 11 February 1828. Borodino stopped at Lisbon to repair damages she had sustained. She arrived at Sydney on 12 July. She had embarked 200 male convicts, all of whom survived the voyage.

The RS for 1830 showed Borodino's master changing from Mentrup to Caine, and her trade from London–New South Wales to London–Sierra Leone. LR for 1830 showed the same change in master, but her owner as Muller & Co., and no change in trade, i.e., it was still London–New South Wales.

== Fate ==
Borodino continued to appear in Lloyd's Register and the Register of Shipping with updated data. However, the registers were only as accurate as owners chose to keep them. They also published at slightly different times of the year. Thus discrepancies appeared between the two sources.

| Year | Master | Owner | Trade | Source & notes |
|---|---|---|---|---|
| 1833 | Hobbs | Muller & Co. | London–Rio de Janeiro | LR; small repairs 1829 |
| 1833 | Caine | Hill & Co. | London–Petersburgh | RS; large repair 1826 |

Borodino was no longer listed in LR in 1834; the RS had ceased publication with the 1833 volume.
