= Gaius Julius Caesar (name) =

Set index on a Roman name

Gaius Julius Caesar (Ancient Greek: ΓΑΙΟΣ ΙΟΥΛΙΟΣ ΚΑΙΣΑΡ) (Note: Ancient Greek: Γάιος Ἰούλιος Καίσαρ, romanized: Gáios Ioúlios Kaísar) was a prominent name of the Gens Julia from Roman Republican times, borne by a number of figures, most notably by the general and dictator Gaius Julius Caesar.

== Julius Caesar's name ==
The name Caesar probably originated in Italy from a dialect of Latium which did not share the rhotacism of the Roman dialect. (That is, the s between vowels did not change to r.) Using the Latin alphabet as it existed in the day of Julius Caesar (100 BC – 44 BC) (i.e., without lower case letters, "J", or "U"), Caesar's name is properly rendered GAIVS IVLIVS CAESAR (the spelling CAIVS is also attested and is interchangeable with the more common GAIVS; however the letter C was used with its antique pronunciation of [g], as it was an adaptation of Greek gamma). It is often seen abbreviated to C. IVLIVS CÆSAR. (The letterform Æ is a ligature, which is often encountered in Latin inscriptions, where it was used to save space, and is nothing more than the letters "ae".) The leading vowels in each part of the name are long, and in Classical Latin, the whole name was pronounced [ˈɡajjʊs ˈjuːlɪ.ʊs ˈkae̯sar], or, alternatively, with praenomen pronounced trisyllabically as [ˈɡaːɪ.ʊs]. In Greek, during Caesar's time, his name was written Καῖσαρ, which was pronounced more or less the same.

Roman nomenclature is somewhat different from the modern English form. Gaius, Iulius, and Caesar are Caesar's praenomen, nomen, and cognomen, respectively. In modern English usage, his full name might be something like "Gaius Caesar of the Juliuses", where 'Caesar' denoted him as a member of the 'Caesarian' family branch of the 'Julius' clan or gens Julia in proper Latin, and 'Gaius' was his personal name. Though contemporary writers almost always referred to him as "Gaius Caesar," the name's historical usage was not the same as it is in the 21st century. Caesar's grand-nephew, Gaius Octavius Thurinus, duly took the full name "Gaius Julius Caesar" upon Caesar's posthumous adoption of him in 44 BC (while legally he should have been "Gaius Julius Caesar Octavianus", and was/is called as such by contemporaries and historians, he himself never used either of his original surnames again), and the name of Caesar became fused with the imperial dignity after Octavianus became the first Roman Emperor, Augustus; in this sense it is preserved in the German and Bulgarian words Kaiser and Tsar (sometimes spelled Czar), both of which refer to an emperor. Compare the Hungarian, Slavic and Turkish words for "king", forms of kral, all adapted from Karl, the personal name of Charlemagne.

The name of the dictator Julius Caesar—Latin script: CAIVS IVLIVS CAESAR—was often extended by the official filiation Gai filius ("son of Gaius"), rendered as Gaius Iulius Gai filius Caesar. A longer version can also be found, however rarely: Gaius Iulius Gai(i) filius Gai(i) nepos Caesar ("Gaius Julius Caesar, son of Gaius, grandson of Gaius"). Caesar spoke of himself only as Caius Caesar, omitting the nomen gentile Iulius. After his senatorial consecration as Divus Iulius in 42 BC, the dictator perpetuo bore the posthumous name Imperator Gaius Iulius Caesar Divus (IMP•C•IVLIVS•CAESAR•DIVVS, best translated as "Commander [and] God Gaius Julius Caesar"), which is mostly given as his official historical name. Suetonius also speaks of the additional title Pater Patriae, which would render Caesar's complete name as Imperator Gaius Iulius Caesar Pater Patriae Divus.

== The praenomen Gaius ==
Gaius is an archaic Latin name and one of the earliest Roman praenomina. Before the introduction of the letter 'G' into the Latin alphabet, i.e. before the censorship of Appius Claudius Caecus in 312 BC, the name was only written as Caius. The old spelling remained valid in later times and existed alongside Gaius, especially in the form of the abbreviation C.

The only known original Roman etymology of Gaius is expressed as a gaudio parentum, meaning that the name Gaius stems from the Latin verb gaudere ("to rejoice", "to be glad"). This etymology is commonly seen as incorrect, and the origin of Gaius is often stated as still unknown. Some have linked the name to an unknown Etruscan phrase, others to the gentilician name Gavius, which possibly might have lost the medial v in the course of time. But no supporting evidence has been found to this day.

== The nomen Iulius ==
Virgil and his commentator Servius wrote that the gens Iulia had received their name Iulius from the family's common ancestor, Aeneas' son Ascanius, who was also known under his cognomen Iulus, which is a derivative of iulus, meaning "wooly worm". Such nicknames were typical for cognomina and were the base of old gentilician names. By tracing their descent from Aeneas, the Iulii belonged to the so-called "Trojan" families of Rome.

Weinstock (1971) made a case for Iullus being a diminutive, i.e. juvenescent theophoric name of Iovis, which used to be one of the older names of the god Iuppiter. Weinstock's argument however relies on a hypothetical intermediate form *Iovilus, and he stated himself that Iullus can't originally have been a theophoric name and could therefore only have become one at a secondary stage, after the Julians had established the identification of Iulus as their gentilician god Vediovis (also: Veiovis), who was a "young Iuppiter" himself. Therefore, Alföldi (1975) is correct in rejecting this proposed etymological origin.

Members of the Julian family later connected the name Iulus with ἰοβόλος ("the good archer") and ἴουλος ("the youth whose first beard is growing"). This has however no etymological value and is only a retrofitting interpretation concerned with the earlier institution of the Vediovis-cult in Rome together with a statue of Iulus-Vediovis as a (possibly bearded) archer. Others derived Iulius from King Ilus, who was the founder of Ilion (Troy). Weinstock called these the "usual playful etymologies of no consequence".

== The cognomen Caesar ==
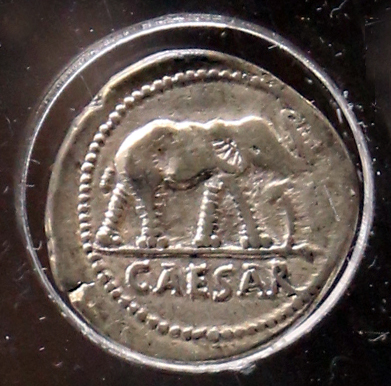
Denarius with elephant and inscription "CAESAR."

In earlier times Caesar could originally have been a praenomen. The suffix –ar is highly unusual for Latin, but is a common suffix in the Sabine Oscan language, spoken in Southern Italy up to the 1st century AD. The etymology of the name Caesar is still unknown and was subject to many interpretations even in antiquity. Julius Caesar himself may have propagated the derivation from the elephant, an animal that was said to have been called caesai in the "Moorish", i.e. probably Punic language, thereby following the claims of his family that they inherited the cognomen from an ancestor, who had received the name after killing an elephant (presumably a war elephant), possibly during the first Punic War (264–241 BC). Since the Gauls came to know the elephant through the Punic commander Hannibal, it is possible that the animal was also known under the name caesar or caesai in Gaul. Caesar used the animal during his conquest of Gaul and probably of Britain, which is further supported by the inclusion of forty elephants on the first day of Caesar's Gallic triumph in Rome. Caesar displayed an elephant above the name CAESAR on his first denarius, which he probably had minted while still in Gallia Cisalpina. Apart from using the elephant as a claim for extraordinary political power in Rome, the coin is an unmasked allusion to this etymology of the name and directly identifies Caesar with the elephant, because the animal treads a Gallic serpent-horn, the carnyx, as a symbolic depiction of Caesar's own victory.

Several other interpretations were propagated in antiquity, all of which remain highly doubtful:

- a caesiis oculis ("because of blue-grey eyes"): Caesar's eyes were black, but since the despotic dictator Sulla had blue eyes, this interpretation might have been created as part of the anti-Caesarian propaganda in order to present Caesar as a tyrant.
- a caesaries ("long, flowing, luxuriant hair"): Since Caesar was balding, this interpretation might have been part of the anti-Caesarian mockery, or perhaps an ironic nickname given in jest.
- a caeso matris utero ("because cut from [his] mother's womb"): Caesar himself could not have been born this way, because in the pre-modern era Caesarean sections were always fatal for the mother, or were performed on women who had already died, whereas his mother (Aurelia) lived into her 60's. In theory this might go back to an unknown Julian ancestor who was born in this way. On the other hand, it could also have been part of the anti-Caesarian propaganda, because in the eyes of the Republicans Caesar had defiled the Roman "motherland", which was also reported for one of Caesar's dreams, in which he committed incest with his mother, i.e. the earth.

Another interpretation of Caesar deriving from the verb caedere ("to cut") could theoretically have originated in the argument of the Julians for receiving a sodality of the Lupercalia, the luperci Iulii (or Iuliani). The praenomen Kaeso (or Caeso) was best known from the Quinctii and the Fabii, possibly derived from their ritual duty of striking with the goat-skin (februis caedere) at the luperci Quinctiales and the luperci Fabiani respectively, the Julians would then have argued that the name Caesar was identical to the Quinctian and Fabian Kaeso. The identification of the cognomina Kaeso and Caesar was indeed supposed by Pliny, but is—according to Alföldi (1975)—unwarranted.
