= Julio César Tobar =

Colombian footballer (born 1978)

Personal information
- Date of birth: June 30, 1978 (age 48)
- Place of birth: Cali, Colombia
- Height: 1.74 m (5 ft 9 in)
- Position: Defender

Team information
- Current team: Millonarios
- Number: 13

Senior career*
Years	Team	Apps	(Gls)
1998–1999	Deportivo Pasto		
2000	Deportivo Cali		
2001	Cortuluá		
2002–2003	Deportivo Pasto		
2004	Centauros		
2005	Atlético Huila		
2006–2007	Cortuluá		
2008	Millonarios		
- * Club domestic league appearances and goals as of 27 March 2008

Julio César Tobar (born June 30, 1978) is a Colombian footballer who plays defender for Millonarios.
