= Borodino, Suzdalsky District, Vladimir Oblast =

Borodino Бородино
- Village
- Location within Vladimir Oblast Location within Russia
- Coordinates: 56°11′N 40°17′E
- Country: Russia
- Region: Vladimir Oblast
- District: Suzdalsky District
- Time zone: UTC+3:00

Borodino (Russian: Бородино) is a rural locality (a village) in Novoalexandrovskoye Rural Settlement, Suzdalsky District, Vladimir Oblast, Russia. The population was 24 as of 2010. There are 4 streets.

== Geography ==
Borodino is located 44 km southwest of Suzdal (the district's administrative centre) by road. Zeleni is the nearest rural locality.
