= Borodino (village), Mozhaysky District, Moscow Oblast =

Village in Mozhaysky District, Moscow Oblast, Russia

Borodino
- Village
- Location within Moscow Oblast Location within Russia
- Coordinates: 55°32′N 35°49′E
- Country: Russia

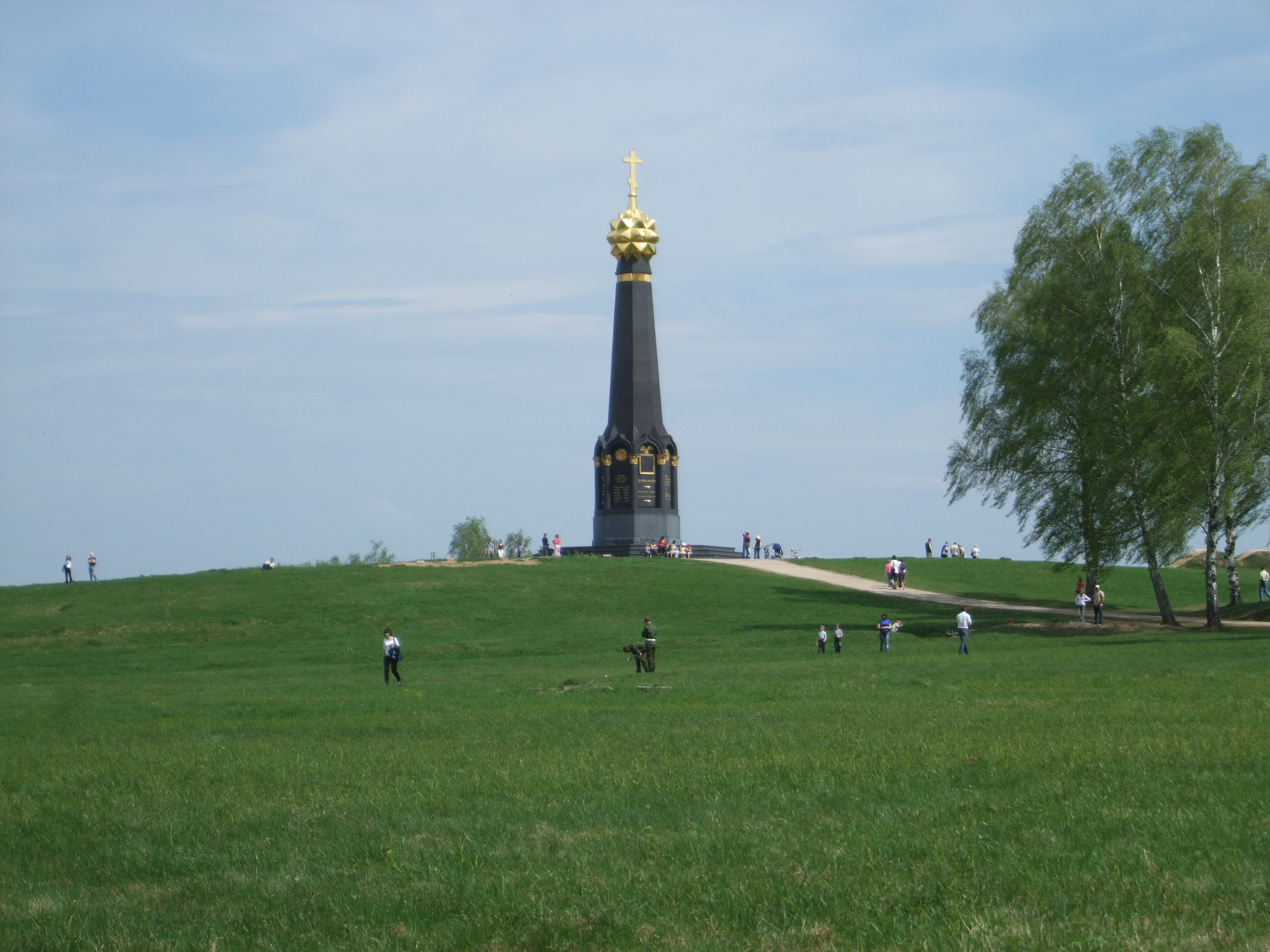
The main monument to the Battle of Borodino

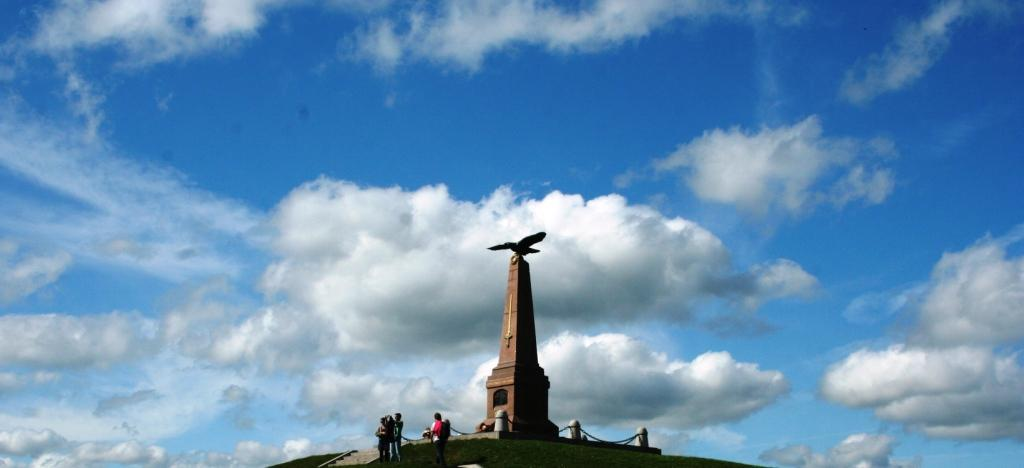
The Kutuzov Obelisk in Borodino

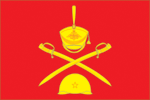
The Flag of Borodinskoye Rural Settlement, of which the village of Borodino is the administrative centre

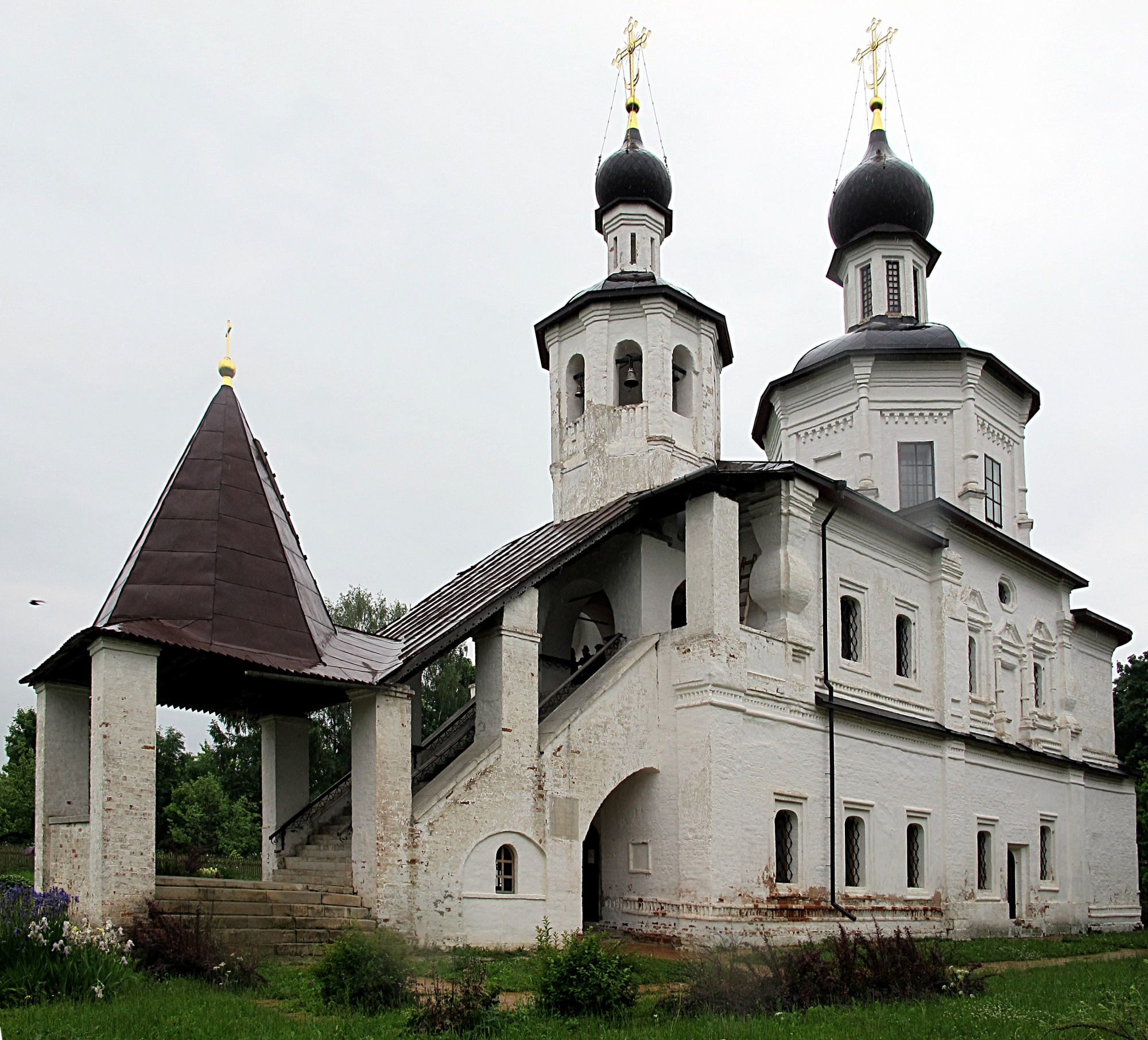
The Borodino Smolensk Church

Borodino (Russian: Бородино, IPA: [bərədʲɪˈno]) is a village in Mozhaysky District of Moscow Oblast, Russia, located 13 kilometers (8.1 mi) west of Mozhaysk.

The village is famous as the location of the Battle of Borodino that took place on 7 September 1812 as part of the Napoleonic Wars during the French invasion of Russia. The Borodino Battlefield (Бородинское поле) is now part of the State Borodino War and History Museum and Reserve. The reserved area is 109.7 square kilometers (42.4 sq mi); the area of the protected zone is 645 square kilometers (249 sq mi).

== History ==
Archaeological evidence suggests that the area around Borodino was settled around 500 BC by the Finnish, and then Slavic tribes. The well-preserved earthworks of a fort dating from about 200 BC, located near the village of Gorki, represent the earliest known military-historical construction in the Borodino area. However, the earliest written mention of the village of Borodino that has been found was in the 17th century.

Borodino's lands were attached to the Moscow principality at the beginning of the 14th century and were at the boundary with Lithuanian territory along the Old Smolensk Road. The peasants farming the land cultivated winter rye, spring barley, oats, summer wheat, flax, hemp, and buckwheat. The farms were assessed as "fair" to "average". Women, except for fieldwork, were engaged in spinning flax and wool, weaving and knitting, for home use. During the Time of Troubles the area suffered from bandits and raiders, and even until the end of the 18th century much of the area was still abandoned.

According to some reports the hamlet of Borodino was first mentioned in the Mozhayskie scribe books in 1601. During the Time of Troubles the village was described as having a "churchyard on the Tsar's sovereign land on the Voinka River (река Воинка) with the Church of the Exaltation of the Cross of the Lord and the chapel of St. Nicholas", and further "in the church, images and candles and books and every church structure had secular parishioners".

Prior to the construction of its own church at Borodino, people from the area were parishioners of the church of the Exaltation of the Holy Cross, which was on the other side of the Kolocha River at the confluence of the Stonets and Prudki creeks. This church with a chapel (the lower church) in honour of St. Nicholas, Archbishop of Myra was destroyed in the Time of Troubles, probably in 1609. After that, the locals were parishioners in the church of the Assumption in the village Semenov also having a lower chapel of St. Nicholas. There is no further history of this church following the middle of the 17th century.

During the 1941 Battle of Moscow, the field was the place of a severe clash between the Soviet and German forces.

== Sources ==
- Official website of the State Borodino War and History Museum and Reserve (in English and Russian)
- The celebration of the centennial anniversary of Victory in the Patriotic war of 1812. Emperor Nicholas II on Borodinsky celebrations 1912.
