= César (1802 ship) =

History

France
- Name: César
- Launched: 1802
- Acquired: 29 August 1803 by purchase
- Captured: July 1806

United Kingdom
- Name: HMS Cesar
- Acquired: By capture July 1806
- Fate: Wrecked March 1807

General characteristics
- Type: Brig
- Tons burthen: 320 (bm); 209 (by calc.)
- Length: c.82 ft (25 m) or c.88 ft (27 m)
- Beam: c.23 ft (7 m)
- Complement: 86 at capture
- Armament: 18 × 4-pounders

César was a mercantile brig launched in 1802 that the French Navy purchased at Bordeaux in 1803. The Royal Navy captured her in July 1806 and took her into their service, but she was wrecked in early 1807.

== Origins ==
César was launched in 1802, possibly as a corvette-senault (snow-rigged corvette). The Ministry of Marine authorized her purchase on 29 August 1803 from citizen Dupuch.

== Capture ==
In July 1806, a squadron under Lord St. Vincent's was off Ushant. On 14 July the boats of the squadron were taken by Iris to Captain John Tremayne Rodd in Indefatigable off Rochefort to attack two French corvettes and a convoy at the entrance to the Garonne. The weather on 15 July appeared suitable for the attempt but after the boats left a strong wind blew up and although they managed to capture Caesar [sic], they could not prevent the convoy escaping up river. The French were expecting the attack and put up a strong resistance. The British lost six men killed, 36 wounded and 21 missing. Indefatigable alone lost two killed and 11 wounded. Polyphemus had two men lightly wounded. The 21 missing men were in a boat from Revenge; a later report suggested that most, if not all, had been taken prisoner. The majority of the boats were either shot through or so badly stove in that they were swamped, and had to be cut adrift from the brig as she was brought out under fire from the batteries and the ex-British brig Teaser. The vessels claiming prize money included Pilchard and the hired armed lugger Nile, in addition to the various ships of the line and frigates. Head money for the capture was paid in June 1829. This cutting out expedition resulted in the participants qualifying for the Naval general service Medal with clasp "16 July Boat Service 1806".

Caesar, of 18 guns, had a crew of 86 men according to her roster, and was under the command of lieutenant de vaisseau Louis François Hector Fourré. She was five years old, coppered, 88' by 23', and "appears fit for His Majesty's Service", according to Rodd. The Royal Navy took her into service as the brig HMS Cesar.

== Fate ==
Cesar was driven ashore near the Gironde in March 1807. There were only 45 survivors.
