= Kaiser (disambiguation) =

Kaiser is the German word for "emperor", usually reserved for the emperors of the German and Austrian Empires.

Kaiser or Kaizer may also refer to:

== People ==
- Kaiser (surname), including a list of persons with the name
- Kaiser (Burmese singer) (1961–2026), Burmese singer-songwriter
- "Kaiser" or "Kaiser Franz", both nicknames of Franz Beckenbauer, former German football player, coach, and manager
- Kaiser (footballer), nickname for Spanish footballer Juan Carlos Lázaro Cervera
- Kaiser Gates (born 1996), American basketball player for Hapoel Jerusalem of the Israeli Basketball Premier League
- "The Kaiser", nickname of Ralf Souquet, a German professional pool player
- "El Kaiser", nickname of Rafael Márquez, a former Mexican professional football player

== Places ==
- Kaiser, Missouri, United States
- Kaiser, Wisconsin, a ghost town in the United States
- Kaiser Mountains, a mountain range in the Alps
- Kaiser (Martian crater), a crater on Mars
- Kaiser (lunar crater), a crater on the Moon

== Arts and entertainment ==
- Kaiser (card game), a Canadian card game
- Kaiser (video game), a 1984 video game
- Digimon Kaiser, a character from Digimon Adventure
- Kaiser (film), a 1917 short animated film
- The Kaisers
- Kaizers Orchestra

== Brands and enterprises ==
- Related to Henry J. Kaiser:
  - KaiserAir, an airline, charter and service company
  - Kaiser Aluminum, an aluminum company
  - Kaiser Broadcasting, an entity that owned and operated broadcast television stations in the United States, 1958–77
  - Kaiser Center, a skyscraper building in Oakland, California
  - Kaiser Motors, an automobile trademark
  - Kaiser Permanente, a health maintenance organization (HMO) based in the U.S. state of California
  - Kaiser Shipyards, part of Kaiser Shipbuilding Company
  - Kaiser Steel, a former steelmaking company that was based in California
  - Kaiser Foundation
- HTC Kaiser, an alternate name for the HTC TyTN II Pocket PC phone
- Kaiser brewery, a Brazilian brewery
- Kaiser's (supermarket), a German supermarket chain

== Computing and technology ==
- KAISER, an alternate name for kernel page-table isolation, a security method
- Kaiser window, a window function used for digital signal processing

== Ships ==
- SMS Kaiser (1858), a screw ship of the line of the Austro-Hungarian fleet
- SMS Kaiser (1875), a German cruiser launched in 1875
- SMS Kaiser (1911), a German battleship launched in 1911
- Henry J. Kaiser-class replenishment oiler, a United States Navy class of replenishment oilers
  - USNS Henry J. Kaiser (T-AO-187), a U.S. Navy fleet replenishment oiler in Military Sealift Command service since 1986

== Other uses ==
- Kaisers, the space police from Brave Exkaiser
- Kaiser Burnout, a fire set by Confederate Captain James Kaiser during the American Civil War
- Kaiser (horse), a New Zealand Thoroughbred racehorse
- Kaiser pear, or Bosc pear, a pear cultivar
- Kaiser roll, a type of bread roll
- Kaiser test, a chemical test for the presence of primary amines using ninhydrin
- Kaiser (beer), a Brazilian beer brand
- Ludwig Kaiser, the ring name of German Wrestler Marcel Barthel

== See also ==
- Kaiser-i-Hind (disambiguation)
- Kaisar (disambiguation)
- Kayser (disambiguation)
- Keiser (disambiguation)
- Keyser (disambiguation)
- Kesar (disambiguation)
- Qeysar (disambiguation)
- Caesar (disambiguation)
- Qaisar, given name in the Middle East, Arabic version of Caesar respectively Kaiser
