= Kaisar =

Kaisar may refer to:

- Band-e Kaisar, a bridge in Shushtar, Iran
- Kaisar Jahan, an Indian politician
- Kaisar Nurmaganbetov, a Kazakhstani canoeist
- FC Kaisar, a football club in Kazakhstan
- Emperor of India, a title of the British monarch
  - Kaisar-i-Hind Medal, a former medal of India
- Puti Kaisar Mihara, model and pendekar

== See also ==
- Qeysar (disambiguation)
- Kaiser (disambiguation)
- Kaiser-i-Hind (disambiguation)
- Qaisar, a name
- Qaisar Bagh, a garden in Lucknow, India
