= Qeysar =

Qeysar, Qaysar, or Qaisar, Arabic and Persian for "Caesar", may refer to:

- Qeysar (film), an Iranian film
- Qaysar District, Faryab Province, Afghanistan
- Qeysar, Qaen, a village in Qaen County, South Khorasan Province, Iran
- Azhar Shah Qaiser (1920-1985), Indian Islamic scholar
- Qaiser Khan (born 1971), Indian politician

== See also ==
- Qaisar, a name
- Qaisar Bagh, a garden in Lucknow, India
- Kaisar (disambiguation)
- Kaiser (disambiguation)
- Caesar (disambiguation)
