= Mahbub Ali =

Mahbub Ali may refer to:

- Mahbub Ali, fictional character in Kim (novel)
- Md. Mahbub Ali, Bangladeshi politician
