= Kaiser-i-Hind (disambiguation) =

Kaiser-i-Hind (lit. 'Caesar of India'; transl. Emperor of India) was a civilian award of the British Raj in India.

Kaiser-i-Hind may also refer to:

- Emperor of India (Kaiser-i-Hind), originally derived from Roman title Caesar
- Teinopalpus aureus, a butterfly commonly known as the golden Kaiser-i-Hind
- Teinopalpus imperialis, a swallowtail butterfly commonly known as the Kaiser-i-Hind

== See also ==
- Kaiser (disambiguation)
- Hind (disambiguation)
- Hind Kesari, an Indian wrestling title
- Hind Kesari (film), a 1935 Indian film
