= Habiganj-4 =

Constituency of Bangladesh's Jatiya Sangsad

Coordinates: 24.10°N 91.29°E

- Constituency for the Jatiya Sangsad
- District: Habiganj District
- Division: Sylhet Division
- Electorate: 427,557 (2018)

Current constituency
- Created: 1984
- Party: Bangladesh Nationalist Party
- Member: S.M. Faisal
- Created from: Sylhet-17
- ← 241 Habiganj-3 243 Brahmanbaria-1 →

Habiganj-4 is a constituency represented in the Jatiya Sangsad (National Parliament) of Bangladesh since 2026 by S.M. Faisal of the Bangladesh Nationalist Party.

== Boundaries ==
The constituency encompasses Chunarughat and Madhabpur upazilas.

== History ==
The constituency was created in 1984 from the Sylhet-17 constituency when the former Sylhet District was split into four districts: Sunamganj, Sylhet, Moulvibazar, and Habiganj.

Ahead of the 2008 general election, the Election Commission redrew constituency boundaries to reflect population changes revealed by the 2001 Bangladesh census. The 2008 redistricting altered the boundaries of the constituency.

Election	Member	Party
1986	Syed Mohammad Qaisar	Jatiya Party
1991	Enamul Haque	Awami League
Feb 1996	Enamul Haque	Awami League
Jun 1996	Enamul Haque	Awami League
2001	Enamul Haque	Awami League
2008	Enamul Haque	Awami League
2014	Mahbub Ali	Awami League
2018	Mahbub Ali	Awami League
2024	Syed Sayedul Haque Suman	Independent
2026	S.M. Faisal	Bangladesh Nationalist Party

== Elections ==
=== Elections in the 2020s ===
General election 2026: Habiganj-4
Party	Candidate	Votes	%	±%
BNP	S.M. Faisal	188,072	61.34	+17.44
BIF	Md. Gias Uddin	84,525	27.57	+27.17
Khelafat Majlis	Ahmed Abdul Quader	26,466	8.63	+6.13
Independent	Md. Mizanur Rahman Chowdhury	652	0.21	N/A
Independent	Saleh Ahmed Sajan	619	0.20	N/A
BML	Shah Md. Al Amin	556	0.18	N/A
BSD	Md. Mujibur Rahman	529	0.17	+0.07
BSM	Md. Rashedul Islam Khokon	484	0.16	N/A
IBB	Md. Rezaul Mostafa	484	0.16	N/A
Majority		103,547	33.77	+22.87
Turnout		306,610	55.48	+17.28
Registered electors		552,711		
BNP gain from AL				

=== Elections in the 2010s ===
General Election 2014: Habiganj-4
Party	Candidate	Votes	%	±%
AL	Mahbub Ali	122,433	87.1	+32.2
Independent	Syed Tanvir Ahmed	14,765	10.5	N/A
JP(E)	Ahad Uddin Chowdhury	3,344	2.4	N/A
Majority		107,668	76.6	+65.7
Turnout		140,542	38.2	−48.9
AL hold				

=== Elections in the 2000s ===
General Election 2008: Habiganj-4
Party	Candidate	Votes	%	±%
AL	Enamul Haque Mostafa Shahid	155,896	54.9	+9.7
BNP	SM Faisal	124,788	43.9	+4.7
Zaker Party	Jasim Uddin Chowdhury	2,380	0.8	N/A
BIF	Mohammad Muslim Khan	1,132	0.4	N/A
Majority		31,108	10.9	+4.9
Turnout		284,196	87.1	+10.8
AL hold				

General Election 2001: Habiganj-4
Party	Candidate	Votes	%	±%
AL	Enamul Haque Mostafa Shahid	107,376	45.2	+8.1
BNP	SM Faisal	93,031	39.2	+7.7
IJOF	Syed Mohammad Kaiser	32,446	13.7	N/A
BIF	Ali Mohammad Chowdhury	2,650	1.1	N/A
Independent	Pandit Rabi Das	1,067	0.4	N/A
Independent	Dowlat Mia	488	0.2	N/A
Bangladesh Samajtantrik Dal (Basad-Khalekuzzaman)	Md. Mujibur Rahman	326	0.1	N/A
Jatiya Party (M)	Md. Ashraf Uddin Talukder	120	0.1	N/A
Majority		14,345	6.0	+0.4
Turnout		237,504	76.3	+1.0
AL hold				

=== Elections in the 1990s ===
General Election June 1996: Habiganj-4
Party	Candidate	Votes	%	±%
AL	Enamul Haque Mostafa Shahid	70,240	37.1	−8.6
BNP	SM Faisal	59,666	31.5	−3.3
JP(E)	Mesbah Ul Bar Chowdhury	49,409	26.1	−8.5
IOJ	Ahmed Abdul Kader	4,639	2.5	N/A
Jamaat	Md. Mukhlisur Rahman	2,611	1.4	N/A
BIF	Ali Mohammad Chowdhury	1,324	0.7	N/A
Zaker Party	Md. Abdul Salam	647	0.3	−0.8
Gano Forum	Md. Anowar Hossain Chowdhury	507	0.3	N/A
BKA	Md. A. Jalil	269	0.1	N/A
Majority		10,574	5.6	−5.3
Turnout		189,312	75.3	+20.1
AL hold				

General Election 1991: Habiganj-4
Party	Candidate	Votes	%	±%
AL	Enamul Haque Mostafa Shahid	67,847	45.7	
BNP	SM Faisal	51,694	34.8	
JP(E)	Tazul Islam	26,188	17.6	
Zaker Party	Jasim Uddin Chowdhury	1,627	1.1	
NAP (Muzaffar)	M. A. Motakabbir	593	0.4	
Jatiya Samajtantrik Dal-JSD	Mohammad Firoz	539	0.4	
Majority		16,153	10.9	
Turnout		148,488	55.2	
AL gain from JP(E)				
