= Frederik Kaiser =

Dutch astronomer

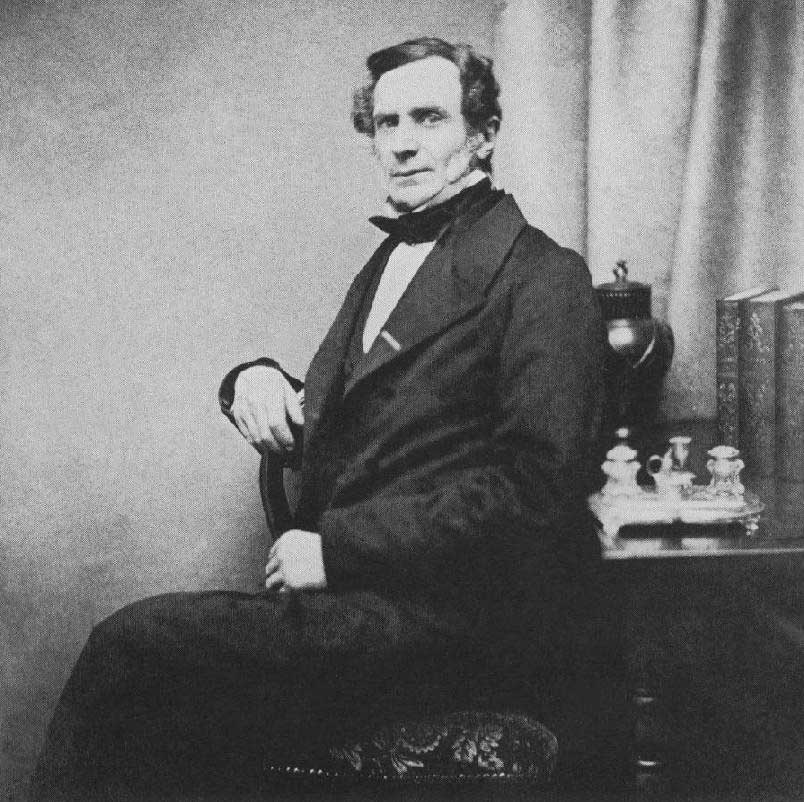
Frederik Kaiser, unknown date.

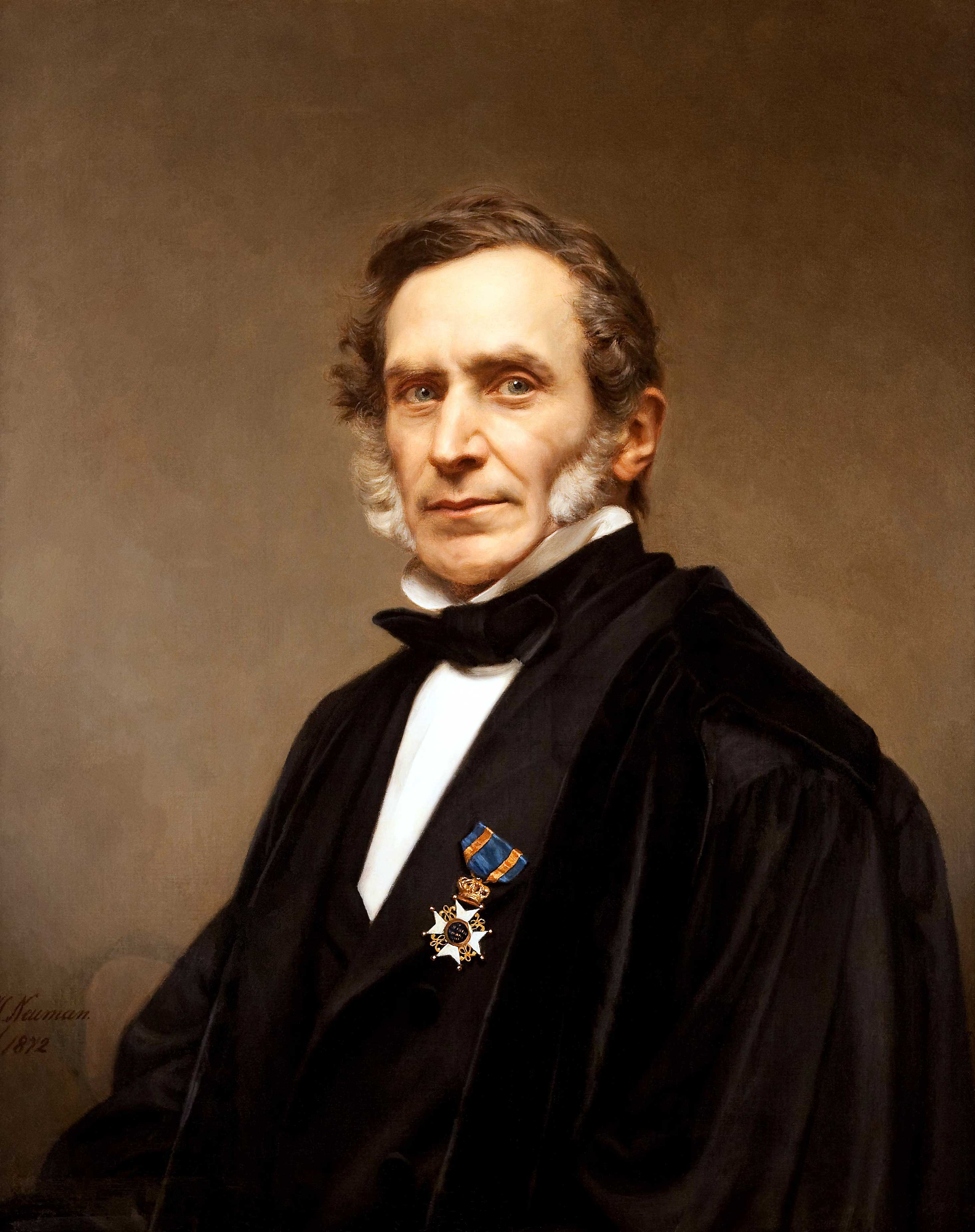
Johan Heinrich Neuman: Frederik Kaiser, 1872. Collection Leiden University.

Frederik Kaiser (Amsterdam, 10 June 1808 – Leiden, 28 July 1872) was a Dutch astronomer. He was director of the Leiden Observatory from 1838 until his death.

He is credited with the advancement of Dutch astronomy through his scientific contributions of positional measurements, his popularization of astronomy in the Netherlands, and by helping to build a state-of-the-art observatory in 1861. Today it is known as the "Old Observatory"). Among his students were Jean Abraham Chrétien Oudemans, Johannes van der Waals, Hendricus Gerardus van de Sande Bakhuyzen and Hendrik Antoon Lorentz.

Kaiser made a series of drawings of Mars at its opposition in 1862 and made a fairly precise determination of its rotational period by comparing his drawings with those of Christiaan Huygens.

Craters on Mars and on the Moon are named in his honour, as well as asteroid 1694 Kaiser.

In Richard Proctor's now-abandoned Martian nomenclature, Syrtis Major Planum was called the "Kaiser Sea". This nomenclature was later dropped in favor of the one introduced by Giovanni Schiaparelli.

Kaiser's parents were Johann Wilhelm Keyser and Anna Sibella Liernur but he was raised by his uncle Johan Frederik Keyser from the age of eight.

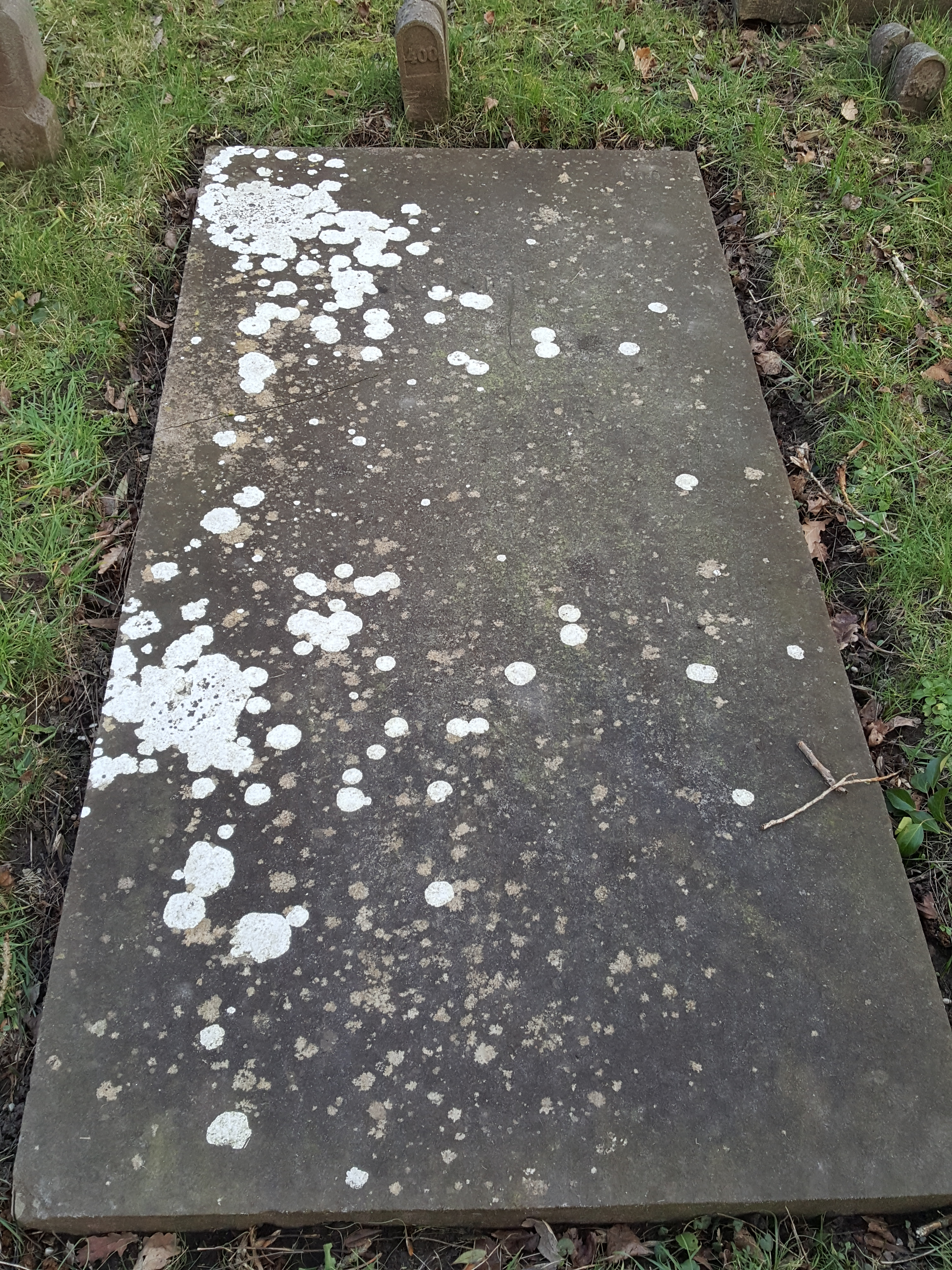
Grave of Frederik Kaiser on the Groenesteeg graveyard in Leiden, the Netherlands. Grave number 400, 2021.

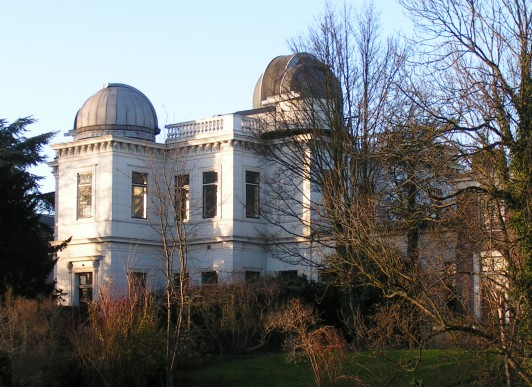
The Old Observatory in Leiden, 2006.

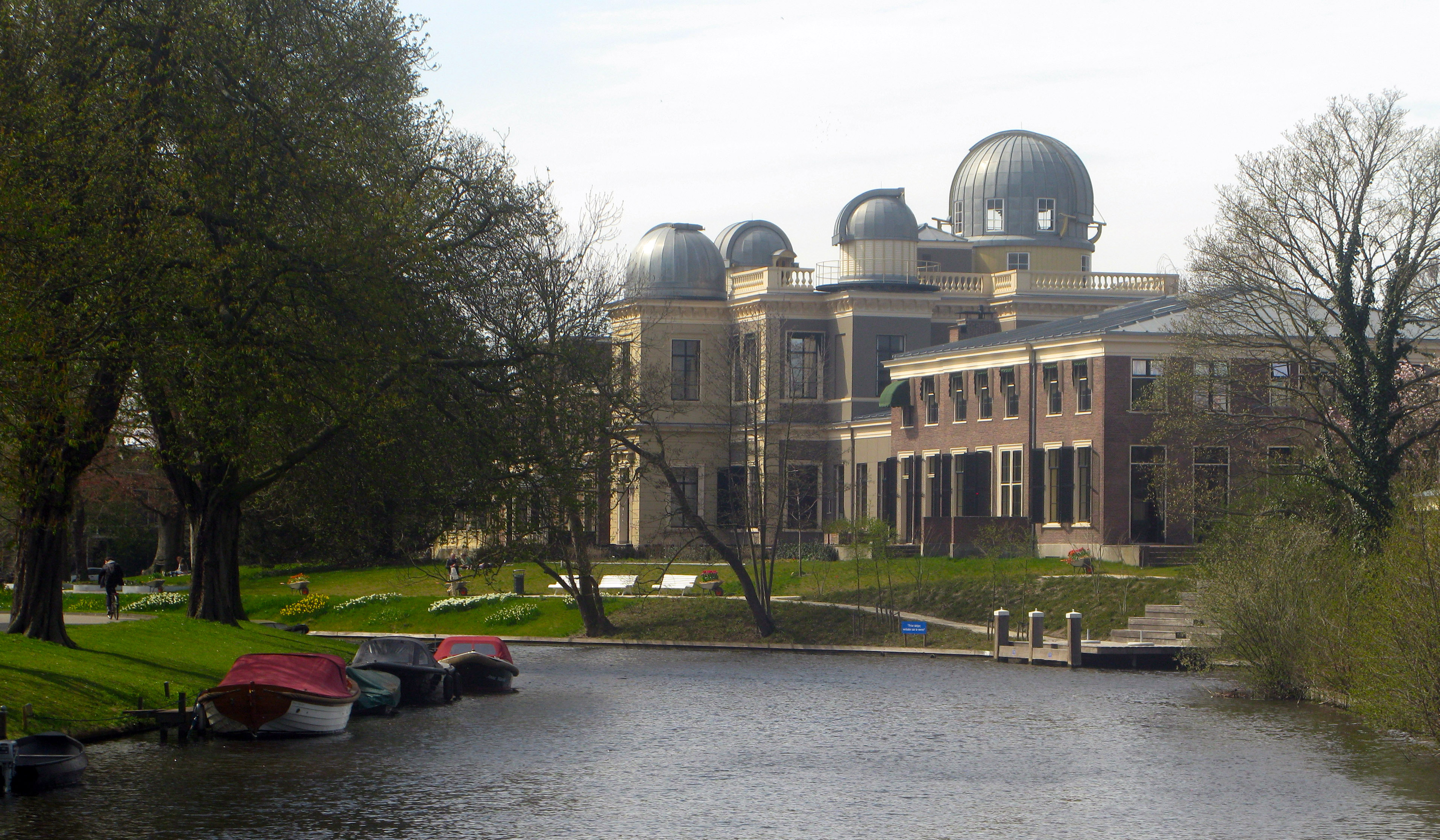
The Old Observatory after restoration, 2013.
