= Syed Mohammad Qaisar =

Bangladeshi politician (1940–2022)

- সৈয়দ মোহাম্মদ কায়সার

Minister of State for Agriculture
- In office 1988–1991

Member of Parliament for Habiganj-4
- In office 1988–1991
- Succeeded by: Enamul Haque Mostafa Shahid
- In office 1986–1988
- In office 1979–1986
- Preceded by: Enamul Haque Mostafa Shahid

Personal details
- Born: 19 June 1940 Habiganj, British Raj
- Died: 11 February 2022 (aged 81) Dhaka, Bangladesh
- Citizenship: Bangladeshi
- Party: Jatiya Party
- Occupation: Politician
- Cabinet: Ershad Cabinet

Syed Mohammad Qaisar (19 June 1940 – 11 February 2022) was a Bangladeshi Jatiya Party politician who served as a state minister, and as a member of the Parliament of Bangladesh from 1979 to 1988. He was convicted for committing war crimes during the 1971 Bangladesh Liberation War and the International Crimes Tribunal of Bangladesh sentenced him to death in December 2014 for crimes against humanity. His crimes included genocide, mass murder, rape and arson. During the war, he formed a militia group in his name called Qaisar Bahini.

== Early life and education ==
Qaisar was born on 19 June 1940 in the village of Itakhola under Madhabpur in Habiganj of the then British India (now Bangladesh). His father's name was Syed Sayeduddin and mother was Begum Hamida Banu. According to his testimony to the Bangladesh Election Commission, Qaisar passed Secondary School Certificate from Armanitola Government High School, Higher Secondary School Certificate from Jagannath College and received BA degree. But it was contradicted during his trial.

== Personal life and death ==
He died at Bangabandhu Sheikh Mujib Medical University in Dhaka on 11 February 2022, at the age of 81.
