= Syed Sayedul Haque Suman =

Bangladeshi politician (born 1979)

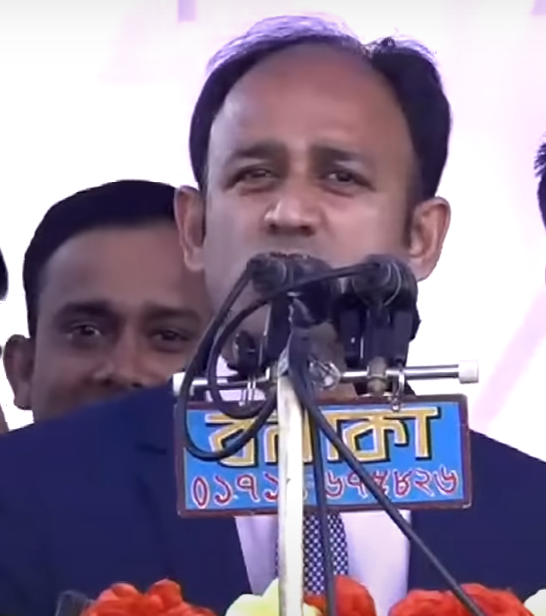
- Suman in 2024

Member of the Bangladesh Parliament for Habiganj-4
- In office 29 January 2024 – 5 August 2024
- Preceded by: Md. Mahbub Ali

Personal details
- Born: 3 September 1979 (age 46) Habiganj, Sylhet, Bangladesh
- Party: Independent
- Other political affiliations: Bangladesh Awami League
- Spouse: Shammi Akter
- Parents: Syed Ershad Ali (father); Ambia Begum Chowdhury (mother)
- Education: University of London; University of Dhaka
- Occupation: Lawyer, social activist, politician

Syed Sayedul Haque Suman (born 3 September 1979), better known as Barrister Suman, is a Bangladeshi lawyer and politician. He is a former Jatiya Sangsad member representing the Habiganj-4 constituency in 2024.

== Career ==
Suman was a legal affairs secretary of the Central committee of Bangladesh Awami Jubo League until he was suspended from his role in August 2021.

Suman resigned from International Crime Tribunal in February 2022.

In 2024 Bangladeshi election, as an independent candidate, he beat his closest opponent, Md. Mahbub Ali, the incumbent 2-time parliamentarian from Awami League and a former state minister for civil aviation and tourism, by nearly 100,000 votes.

== Controversy ==
On 6 August 2024, the day after Sheikh Hasina fled the country because of 2024 Non-cooperation movement, President Mohammed Shahabuddin dissolved the 12th Jatiya Sangsad. So he lost his position as one of its members.

On 22 October 2024, Suman was arrested by Dhaka Metropolitan Police in the Mirpur-6 area. Earlier, two murder cases were filed against him at the Mirpur and Adabar police stations.

== Personal life ==
Suman is married to Shammi Akter.
