= Asad Ali (politician) =

Bangladeshi politician

Alhaj Mawlana Asad Ali

Member of East Pakistan Provincial Assembly
- In office 1970–1970
- Constituency: Sylhet-18

Personal details
- Born: Baneshwar, Habiganj, Sylhet district
- Died: 14 November 2007 Bangladesh
- Party: Awami League
- Children: Md. Mahbub Ali
- Education: University of Calcutta; Presidency College

Mawlana Asad Ali (Bengali: আছাদ আলী; died 14 November 2007) was a Bangladeshi Islamic scholar, politician, teacher and rebel. He was elected to the East Pakistan Provincial Assembly in 1970.

== Early life and education ==
Asad Ali was born in the 20th century to a Bengali family in the village of Baneshwar in Madhabpur, Habiganj subdivision, Sylhet district, British Raj (now Bangladesh). He was a father to five sons and two daughters including former state minister Md. Mahbub Ali.

Ali completed his Bachelor of Arts from the Presidency College in Calcutta, and received his Master of Arts from the University of Calcutta.

== Career ==
Ali began his career as a teacher. He also contributed to founding various institutions in Madhabpur. Ali became the president of the Awami League's Habiganj branch. He was elected to the East Pakistan Provincial Assembly as an Awami League candidate for Sylhet-18 at the 1970 elections but this assembly was not formed. Then the Bangladesh Liberation War broke out and so he helped with that.

== Death ==
Ali died on 14 November 2007.
