= Md. Mahbub Ali =

Bangladeshi politician (born 1961)

- মোঃ মাহবুব আলী
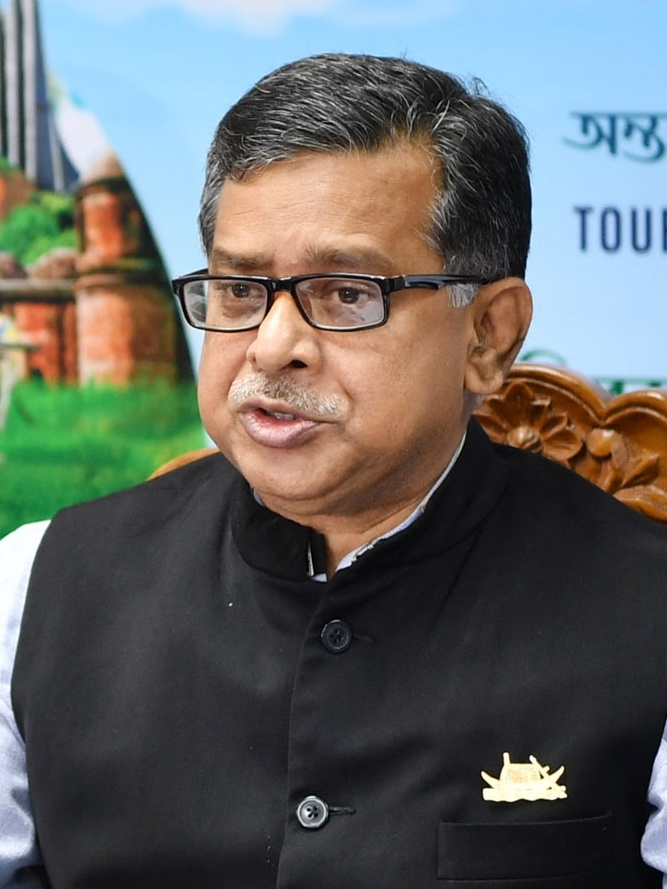
- Ali in 2021

Minister of State for Civil Aviation and Tourism
- In office 7 January 2019 – 10 January 2024
- Prime Minister: Sheikh Hasina
- Preceded by: M. A. Matin
- Succeeded by: Faruk Khan

Member of the Bangladesh Parliament for Habiganj-4
- In office 29 January 2014 – 7 January 2024
- Preceded by: Enamul Haque Shahid
- Succeeded by: Sayedul Haque Suman

Personal details
- Born: 17 July 1961 (age 64) Habiganj District, East Pakistan, Pakistan
- Party: Bangladesh Awami League
- Parent: Asad Ali (father)
- Education: B.A, L.L.B
- Occupation: Lawyer, politician

Md. Mahbub Ali (born 17 July 1961) is a Bangladesh Awami League politician and a former member of parliament from Habiganj-4. He served as the state minister for civil aviation and tourism in Hasina's fourth cabinet.

== Early life ==
Ali was born on 17 July 1961 to a Bengali family from the village of Baneshwar in Madhabpur, Habiganj subdivision, Sylhet district, East Pakistan. He was the son of Maulana Asad Ali, a former member of the East Pakistan Provincial Assembly. Ali holds a B.A. and a LLB from the University of Chittagong.

== Career ==
Ali was elected to parliament from Habiganj-4 as a candidate of the Awami League in 2014 with 122,433 votes.

Ali was elected to parliament from Habiganj-4 as a candidate of the Awami League on 30 December 2018 with 306,953 votes. His nearest rival, Ahmad Abdul Quader of the Khelafat Majlish, received 45,151 votes.

== Controversy ==
On 15 September 2024, Ali was arrested in Shegunbagicha, Dhaka by the Detective Branch for a murder case in Jatrabari, during the quota reform movement.
