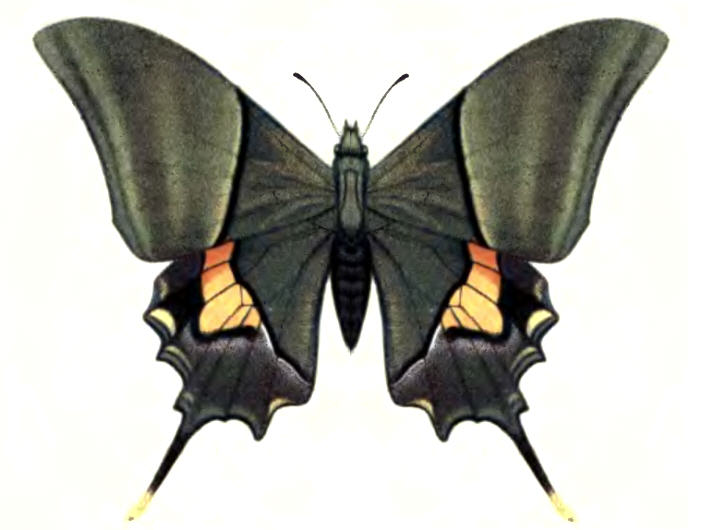
- Teinopalpus imperialis

Scientific classification
- Kingdom: Animalia
- Phylum: Arthropoda
- Class: Insecta
- Order: Lepidoptera
- Family: Papilionidae
- Subfamily: Papilioninae
- Tribe: Teinopalpini
- Genus: Teinopalpus; Hope, 1843

= Teinopalpus =

Genus of butterflies

Teinopalpus is a genus of butterflies in the family Papilionidae.

== Taxonomy ==
The genus contains two species, both with multiple possible subspecies:

- Teinopalpus aureus (Golden kaiser-i-hind)

- T. a. aureus
- T. a. eminens
- T. a. guangxiensis
- T. a. hainanensis
- T. a. laotiana
- T. a. nagaoi
- T. a. shinkaii
- T. a. wuyiensis

- Teinopalpus imperialis (Kaiser-i-hind)

- T. i. behludinii
- T. i. colettei
- T. i. gerritesi
- T. i. gillesi
- T. i. herteri
- T. i. imperatrix
- T. i. imperialis
- T. i. miecoae
