= S.M. Faisal =

Bangladeshi politician, industrialist and former MP

Syed Mohammad Faisal
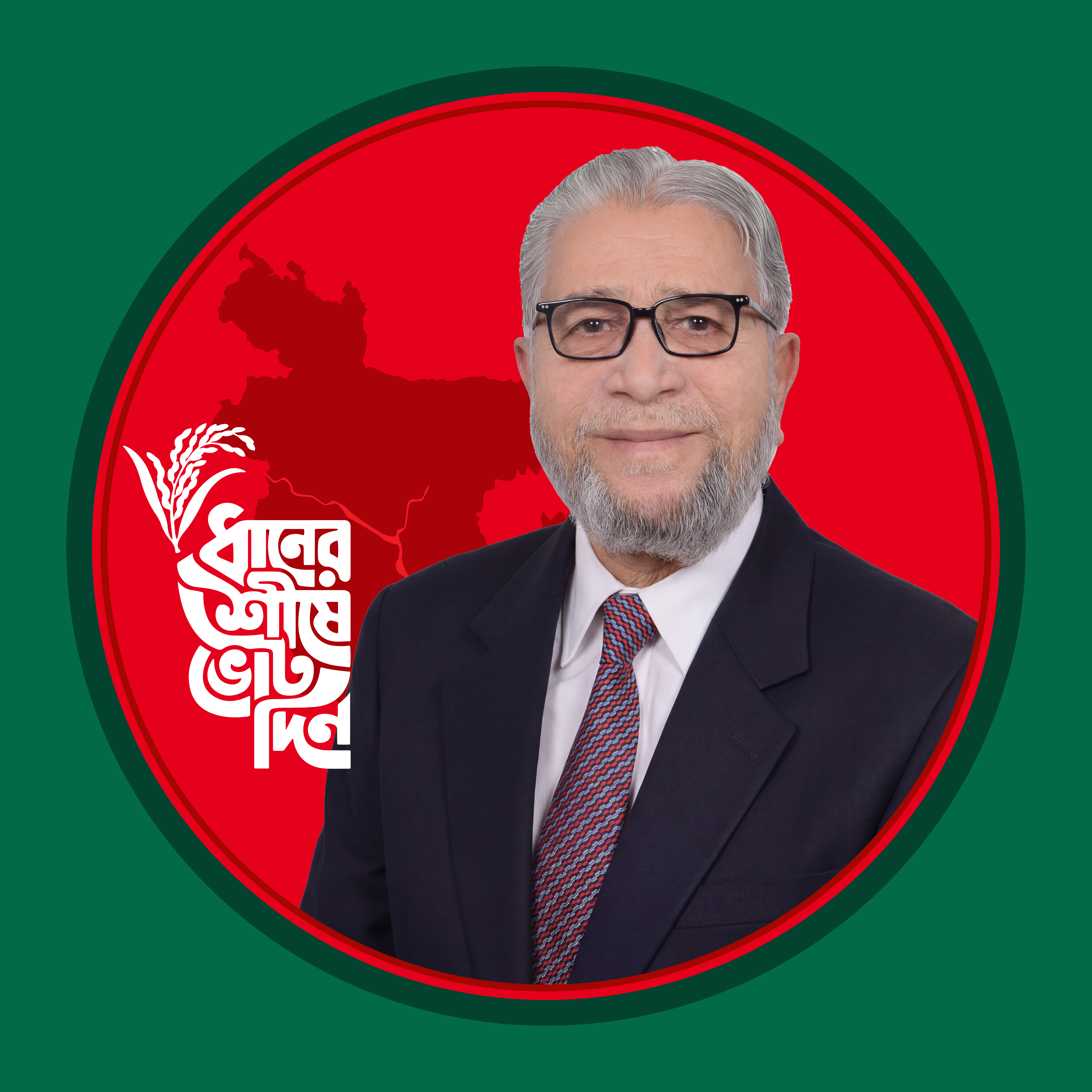

Member of Bangladesh Parliament

Member of the Bangladesh Jatiya Sangsad Parliament for Habiganj-4 (Chunarughat–Madhabpur)
- In office 15 February 1996 – 12 June 1996
- Preceded by: Enamul Haque Mostafa Shahid
- Succeeded by: Enamul Haque Mostafa Shahid

Personal details
- Born: January 1, 1942 (age 84) Habiganj, Bangladesh
- Party: Bangladesh Nationalist Party (BNP)
- Parent: Syed Sayeed Uddin Ahmed (father)
- Education: M.A., LL.B.
- Alma mater: University of Dhaka
- Occupation: Politician, industrialist, businessman

Syed Mohammad Faisal Who is better known as S.M. Faisal (born 1 January 1942) is a Bangladeshi politician and industrialist. He is a former Bangladesh Nationalist Party politician and a former Member of Parliament for the Habiganj-4 constituency. He is the chairman of Saiham Cotton Mills Limited and the managing director of Saiham Textile Mills Ltd., under the Saiham Group.

== Early life and education ==
Faisal was born in Madhabpur, Habiganj, to the late Syed Sayeed Uddin Ahmed, who served as a former Member of Provincial Assembly (MPA). He obtained his M.A. and LL.B degrees from the University of Dhaka.

== Political career ==
Faisal was elected to the Jatiya Sangsad from the Habiganj-4 constituency on 15 February 1996 as a BNP candidate. He has also served as the president of the Habiganj District unit of the Bangladesh Nationalist Party.
