= Keiser =

Keiser is a derivation of the Germanic Kaiser surname. It may refer to:

== People ==
- César Keiser (1925–2007), Swiss artist
- Herman Keiser (1914–2003), American professional golfer
- Laurence B. Keiser (1895–1969), a U.S. Army major general who commanded the 2nd Infantry Division in the Korean War
- Max Keiser (born 1960), a film-maker, broadcaster and former broker and activist
- Raphaela Keiser (born 1997), Swiss curler
- Reinhard Keiser (1674–1739), German composer
- Stephan Keiser, Swiss curler and curling coach

== Places ==
- Keiser, Arkansas
- Keiser, Oregon, part of the Salem-Keiser metroplex
- Keiser, Northumberland County, Pennsylvania

== See also ==
- Kaiser (disambiguation)
