= Kaiser (card game) =

Canadian card game

- Typical score sheet from a game of Kaiser.
- Origin: Canadian Prairies
- Alternative names: Three-Spot
- Type: Trick-taking
- Players: 4
- Skills: Memory, Tactics, Communication
- Cards: 32
- Deck: French
- Rank (high→low): A K Q J 10 9 8 ♦7 ♣7 ♥5 ♠3
- Play: Clockwise
- Chance: Medium

Related games
- Euchre

Kaiser, or three-spot, is a trick-taking card game popular in the prairie provinces in Canada, especially Saskatchewan and parts of its neighbouring provinces. It is played with four players in two partnerships with a 32-card deck.

== Origins ==
The origins of this game are a mystery and there seems to be no historical record (spoken or written) that justifies it being a solely Saskatchewan-area game. It is popular among Ukrainian communities.

Kaiser means "emperor", the ruler of Germany from 1871 to 1918. During the Second World War a game referred to as troika (Russian troĭka, from troe "three"; akin to Old English thrīe "three") and the English version, three-spot, was played by war veterans in particular. These games were known for their bidding and trumping and the three in particular. The highest bid in these games was called a kaiser bid (12 notrump). It is because of this that it was referred to as the “kaiser bidding game” and eventually just the "kaiser game".

== Dealing ==
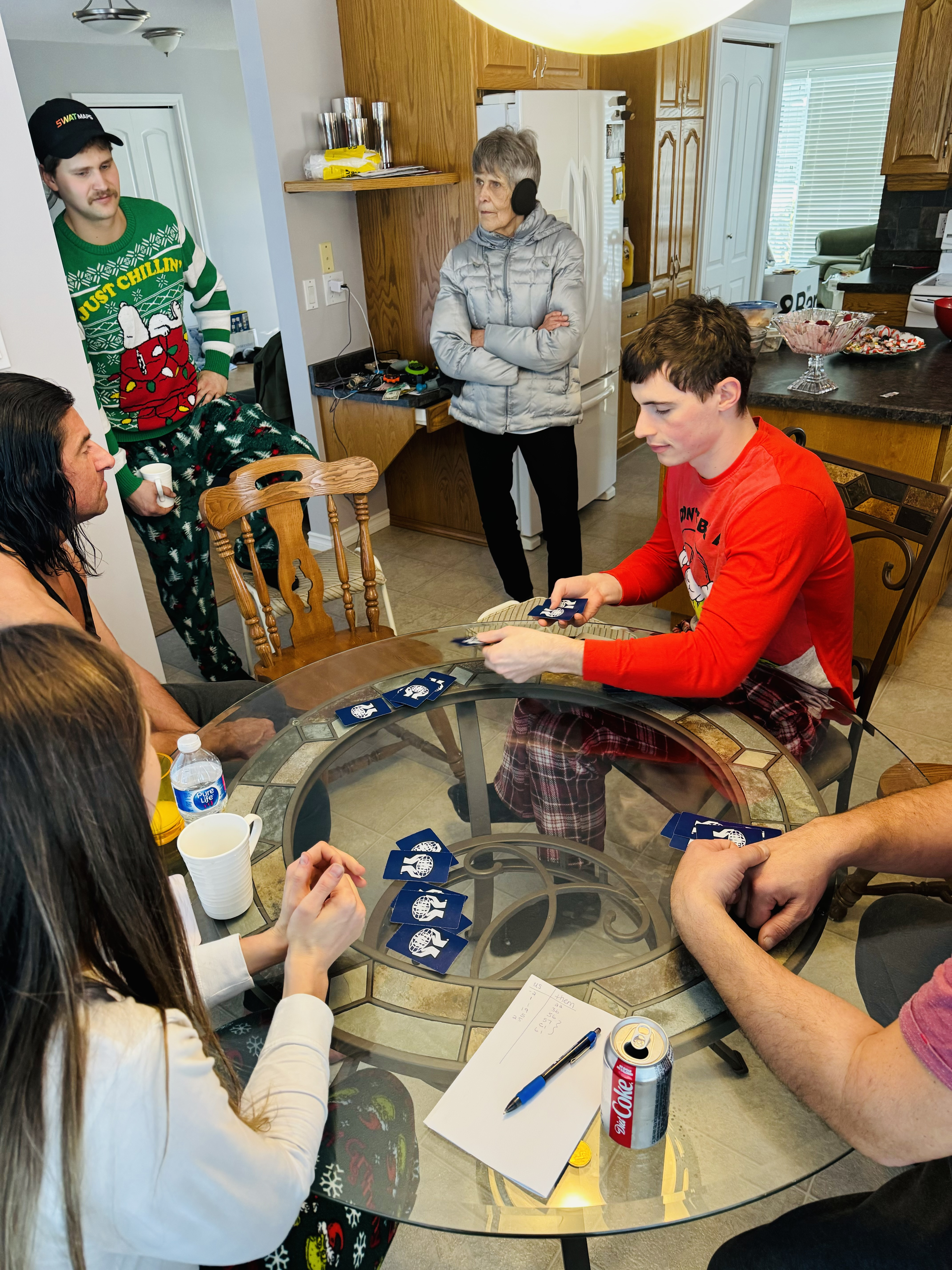
Kaiser at the dealing stage played in Bruno, Saskatchewan

Kaiser is played by four people: two teams of two players each. Unlike many card games, only 32 cards are used out of a normal 52-card deck. The deck contains the cards from eight to ace inclusively (8, 9, 10, jack, queen, king, ace) for each suit. The other four cards are the seven of clubs, seven of diamonds, five of hearts and three of spades. All 32 cards are dealt out: eight to each player. The cards may be dealt in any order to any player so long as each player ends up with eight cards.

== Rule variations ==
Even though kaiser is a rare game, rules do vary between groups and between regions. Some variations on the popular rules include:

- Varying the minimum bid (usually anywhere from five to eight)
- Including the seven of hearts and seven of spades. When dealing, two cards are dealt into a "kitty" and the winning bidder may pick this kitty up and exchange cards in their hand for cards in the kitty. If the three or five are in the kitty, then the player must include these in their playing hand.
- Allowing passing between players. Players are allowed to pass one or two cards before bidding. This can create an opportunity for communication between players within the rules of the game. This is often accompanied by raising the minimum bid, because the increased level of strategy makes it possible to attain higher scores.
- After winning the bid in no trump, the player has an option of playing the hand high or low. In high the play is normal. In low the strength of the cards are reversed while the five of hearts and the three of spades are neutral (for example in "low" play a seven would take a trick over an eight).
