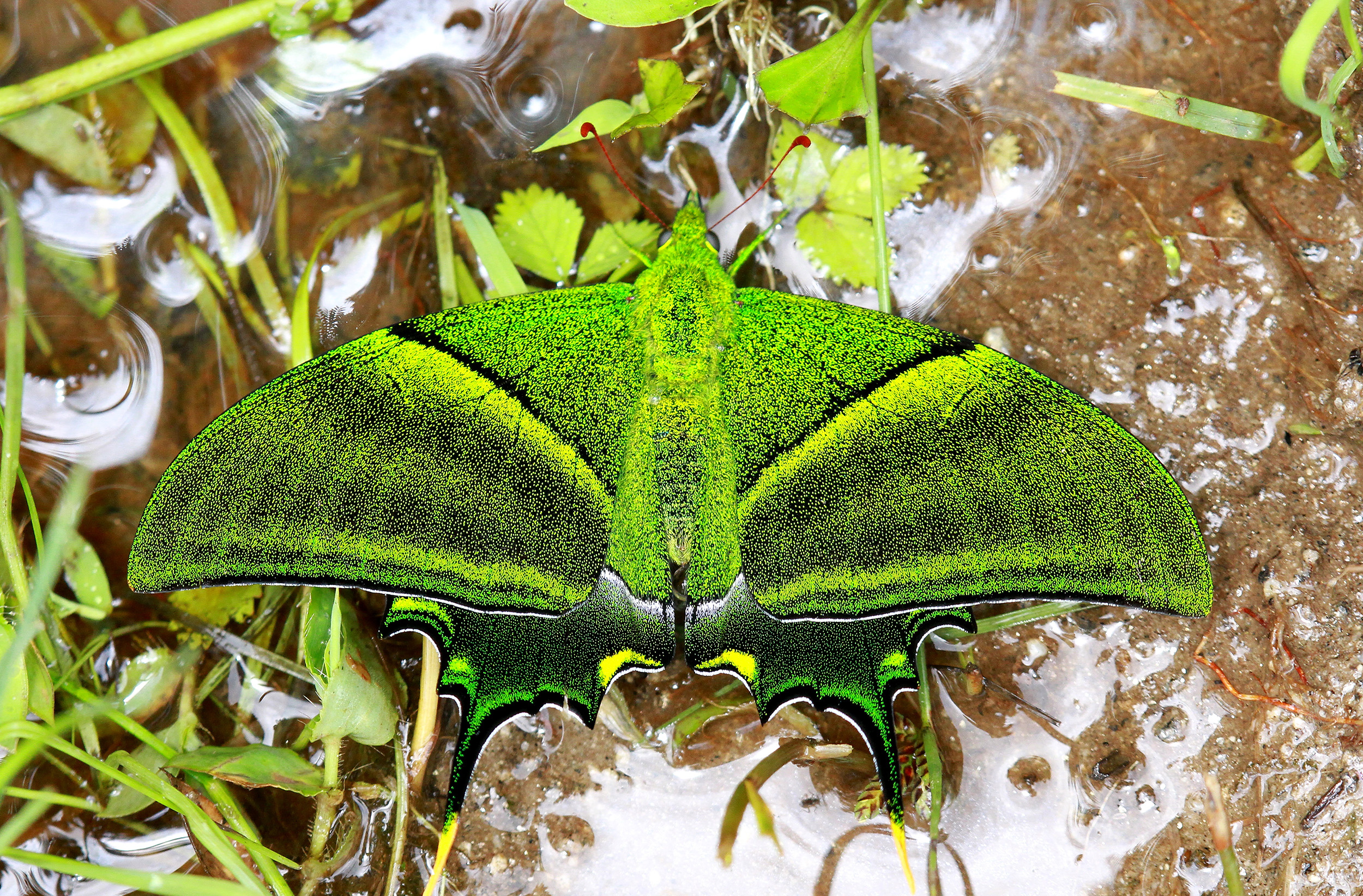
- Teinopalpus imperialis, dorsal side of male

Conservation status
- Near Threatened (IUCN 2.3)
- CITES Appendix II

Scientific classification
- Kingdom: Animalia
- Phylum: Arthropoda
- Clade: Pancrustacea
- Class: Insecta
- Order: Lepidoptera
- Family: Papilionidae
- Genus: Teinopalpus
- Species: T. imperialis

Binomial name
- Teinopalpus imperialis Hope, 1843

= Teinopalpus imperialis =

Kaiser-i-Hind

Species of butterfly

Teinopalpus imperialis, the Kaisar-i-Hind, is a rare species of swallowtail butterfly found from Nepal and north east India to north Vietnam. The common name literally means "emperor of India". The Kaisar-i-Hind is much sought after by butterfly collectors for its beauty and rarity. The green iridescence of the wings has been found to be due to three-dimensional photonic structure of the scales and is the subject of much research.

== Description ==
The Kaisar-i-Hind has a predominantly green swallowtail. The male has a bright chrome-yellow patch on each hind wing.

The following descriptions are from Charles Thomas Bingham (1907) The Fauna of British India, Including Ceylon and Burma, Butterflies Volume 2.

=== Male ===
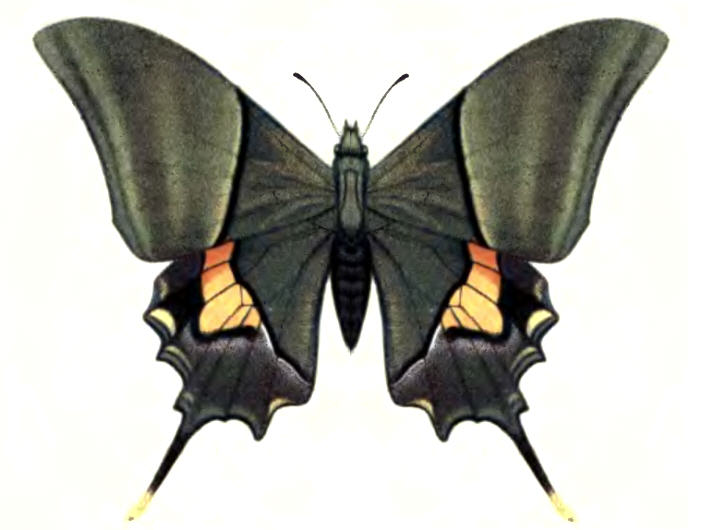
Teinopalpus imperialis male

Upperside black, densely irrorated with green scales. Forewing: an outwardly oblique, slightly concave subbasal band and a narrow terminal edging jet-black due to the ground colour there being devoid of the green scaling; beyond the subbasal band the irroration of scales a much brighter green, especially along the outer edge of the subbasal band itself; but along obscure, broad and convergent discal and postdiscal transverse bands and along a subterminal much narrower band, the green scaling thins out and the black ground colour of the wing shows through; in some specimens, owing to the transparency of the wings, the rich ochraceous-brown colour of the underside gives the black on these bands a reddish tint. Hindwing: basal area margined outwardly by a narrow irregularly sinuous band devoid of green scaling, succeeded by an upper discal bright chrome-yellow patch that spreads from base of interspace 3 across the apex of the cell and bases of interspaces 4 and 5 to the costa; this patch is bluntly angulated outwards in interspace 5, stained with orange anteriorly and bordered outwardly by black which is widest above; below the patch a white line extends to the dorsum; the postdiscal area is deep dark green, margined inwardly by diffuse dark grey and followed outwardly by a subterminal series of lunular markings, the tornal and upper two or three of which are yellow, the rest bright green; tail tipped with yellow. Underside: basal area of both forewings and hindwings densely covered with green scales. Forewing: terminal two-thirds rich ochraceous brown, the green of the basal area bordered by black; discal and postdiscal bands also black, widened and diffusely coalescent posteriorly; an incomplete, very slender subterminal black line and broader black terminal edging, neither of which reaches to the apex. Hindwing much as on the upperside, but the yellow marking broader. Antennae dark red; head, thorax and abdomen black, covered somewhat densely with green hairs and scales.

=== Female ===
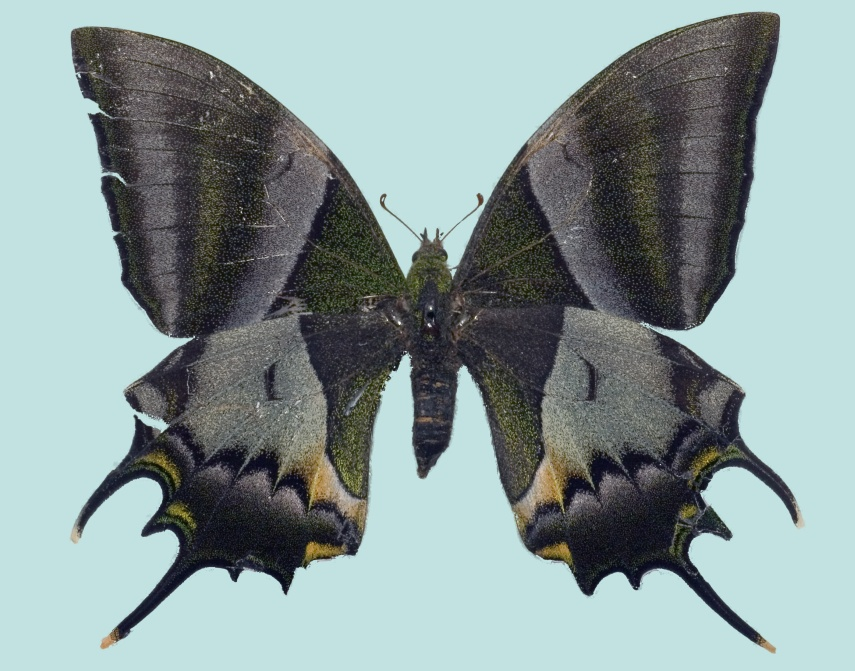
Teinopalpus imperialis female

Much larger, differs also in coloration and markings as follows: Upperside, forewings: the irroration of green scales on the terminal two-thirds restricted to a sub-terminal moderately broad band diffuse along its inner edge, and a medial somewhat ill-defined similar band that is bordered both on the inner and outer sides by diffuse dusky black; this is succeeded by two broad diffuse transverse dark grey bands, the outer of the two edged on its outer side narrowly with black, followed by a subterminal green band and terminal velvety-black margin. Hindwing: the upper discal yellow patch so conspicuous in the male, replaced by a very much larger dark grey patch, below which comparatively narrow markings of yellow extend up to the dorsum; a postdiscal sinuous lunular narrow black band and a subterminal series of green lunules as in the male, but the apical lunule dark grey, not yellow; the tail-like extensions of the termen at the apices of veins 3 to 6 are black shaded with green, those at the apices of veins 4 and 6 tipped, the former with yellow the latter with greenish-white. Underside similar to the underside in the male, but on both forewing and hindwing the areas coloured with rich ochraceous and yellow are grey, with the exception of a well-marked moderately broad subterminal band on the forewing which is of a dull ochraceous colour; on the hindwing the grey discal area extends right up to the apical lunule of the subterminal series. Antennae, head, thorax and abdomen as in the male.

The larva of this butterfly, according to Mr. Knyvett, feeds on Daphne nipalensis, but no description of that is available. It is difficult to separate the Sikkim form of this insect, even as a race. The points of difference between it and the Assam form are extremely variable, and the most prominent of these, that is, the paler tint of the grey area on the upperside of the hindwing in the female, is perhaps the most variable of all the characters. An Assam specimen of the female in the collection of the British Museum is far and away paler than any Sikkim specimen I have seen. Mr. Elwes says that in Sikkim this insect is only found in the forest region from about 6,000 to 10,000 feet (1,800 to 3,000 m) elevation, and that "it is most difficult to capture on account of its remarkably strong, rapid and dashing flight, and its habit of resting on high trees from which it flies only during a few hours of the morning" (Elwes, Transactions of the Entomological Society of London 1888, p. 421). The females are much scarcer than the males.

== Distribution ==
The butterfly is found in small pockets of Nepal, Bhutan and along the Eastern Himalayas in India (West Bengal, Meghalaya, Assam, Sikkim and Manipur). It is also found in northern Myanmar, northern Vietnam and in the Sichuan province of China. Mostly seen above 6,000 feet (1,800 m).

== Status ==
The Kaisar-i-Hind is a local and rare butterfly which is protected by Indian and Nepalese law. Protection enforcement in these countries not being effective; it is hunted and collectors pay high prices. The government of Arunachal Pradesh recently adopted Kaisar-i-Hind as its state butterfly

The two species of Kaisar-i-Hind were listed in CITES Appendix II from 1987 onwards.

The Kaisar-i-Hind would be a keystone species for conservation of high-altitude forest. Conservation in India is complicated by the fact that most of the responsibility for conservation action runs at the state level and not at the national level. There is a need for collecting more data in the habitat area and surrounding areas such as the adjoining mountain regions of China where the species is likely to occur.

== Habitat ==
Mud-puddling activity of Teinopalpus imperialis Hope, 1843 - Kaiser-i-Hind

The Kaisar-i-Hind is a high-altitude forest species which occurs at medium and higher elevations in the Himalayas from 6,000 to 10,000 feet (1,800 to 3,000 m) in well-wooded terrain. In the north east of India, much of its forest habitat is degraded by jhoom cultivation; the butterfly is rarely found in the degraded patches.

== Habits ==
Very fast and strong flight. Flies at tree-top level until it chooses to descend if there is strong morning sunlight. When overcast, males are known to descend and sit on low vegetation, where its disruptive, dull underside colouration makes it difficult to distinguish. Will remain so still that they have even been caught by hand in such circumstances. Females are known to fly in overcast and rainy weather also. Males visit damp patches and also suck moisture from leaves. Females rarely visit flowers or damp patches. Often found on forest clearings and open spaces flanked by forests on hills and mountains. These are mostly males, who establish territories and aggressively drive away other intruding males, and stopping females in search of mates.

== Life cycle ==
Flies in Sikkim in April and May and later in Manipur from May to July. Probably have two broods. The larvae feed on Magnolia campbellii (Magnoliaceae).

Eggs: Smooth, spherical, pale purplish red. Laid on underside of leaves.

Larva: Spindle shaped, green larva with broad heads and tapering tails. The larva has minute spines on the head and hair-like long spines on the segments.

Pupa: Resembles that of Graphium species. It has a smooth head and prominent dorsal horn. It has a green mesothorax and broad yellow dorsal zones on the abdomen.

== Research ==
The iridescent green scaling on the wings of the Kaisar-i-Hind are the subject of much research. The three-dimensional photonic structure has been examined by transmission electron tomography and computer modelling to reveal naturally occurring "chiral tetrahedral repeating units packed in a triclinic lattice" (Argyros et al., 2001), the cause of the iridescence.

== See also ==
- Papilionidae
- List of butterflies of India
- List of butterflies of India (Papilionidae)

== Other sources ==
- Erich Bauer and Thomas Frankenbach, 1998 Schmetterlinge der Erde, Butterflies of the world Part I (1), Papilionidae Papilionidae I: Papilio, Subgenus Achillides, Bhutanitis, Teinopalpus. Edited by Erich Bauer and Thomas Frankenbach. Keltern: Goecke & Evers; Canterbury: Hillside Books ISBN 9783931374624 plate 9, figure 6
- Collins, N. Mark; Morris, Michael G. (1985). Threatened Swallowtail Butterflies of the World: The IUCN Red Data Book. Gland & Cambridge: IUCN. ISBN 978-2-88032-603-6 – via Biodiversity Heritage Library.
- Evans, W.H. (1932). The Identification of Indian Butterflies (2nd ed.). Mumbai, India: Bombay Natural History Society.
- Haribal, Meena (1992). The Butterflies of Sikkim Himalaya and Their Natural History. Gangtok, Sikkim, India: Sikkim Nature Conservation Foundation.
- Igarashi, S. (1987). "On the life history of the Teinopalpus imperialis in northern India and its phylogenetic position in the Papilionidae". Transactions of the Lepidoptera Society of Japan. 38: 115–151.
- Wynter-Blyth, Mark Alexander (1957). Butterflies of the Indian Region. Bombay, India: Bombay Natural History Society. OCLC 842858821.
