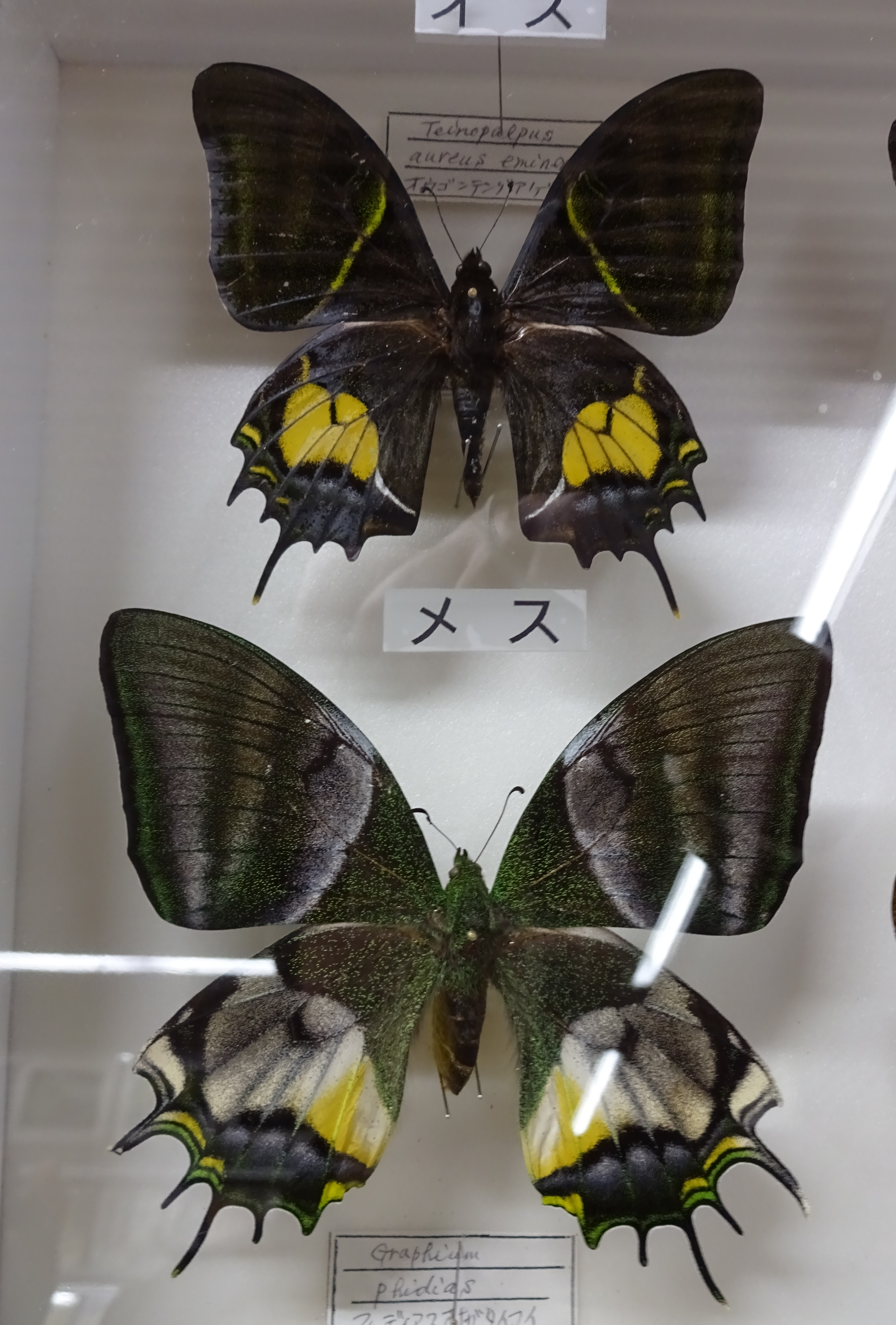

Conservation status
- Data Deficient (IUCN 2.3)
- CITES Appendix II (CITES)

Scientific classification
- Kingdom: Animalia
- Phylum: Arthropoda
- Class: Insecta
- Order: Lepidoptera
- Family: Papilionidae
- Genus: Teinopalpus
- Species: T. aureus

Binomial name
- Teinopalpus aureus Mell, 1923

= Teinopalpus aureus =

Golden Kaiser-i-Hind

Species of butterfly

Teinopalpus aureus, the golden Kaiser-i-Hind, is a species of butterfly in the family Papilionidae. It is found in China, Vietnam and Laos, with several named subspecies The species is considered threatened by the wildlife trade hence is under Appendix II of CITES as part of the listed genus Teinopalpus. It is also specifically protected in China as grade-1 under the Wildlife Protection Law of the PRC (First-class of National Key Protected Animals).

== Distribution ==
Species distribution models show that mountain forests in mid to high elevations of Southern China, Laos, and Vietnam present suitable habitats for T. aureus. However, many of these areas have poorly connected habitat networks and the extent of distribution is predicted to be declining as several portions are facing extensive deforestation and severe climate change effects.

== Subspecies ==
- Teinopalpus aureus aureus Mell, 1923
- Teinopalpus aureus eminens Turlin, 1991
- Teinopalpus aureus guangxiensis Chou & Zhou, 1994
- Teinopalpus aureus hainanensis Lee, ? (per Bauer & Frankenbach, 1998)
- Teinopalpus aureus laotiana Collard, 2007
- Teinopalpus aureus nagaoi Morita, 2003
- Teinopalpus aureus shinkaii Morita, 1998
- Teinopalpus aureus wuyiensis Lee, ? (per Bauer & Frankenbach, 1998)
