= Kaiser =

German word for "emperor", associated with rulers of the German Empire (1871–1918)

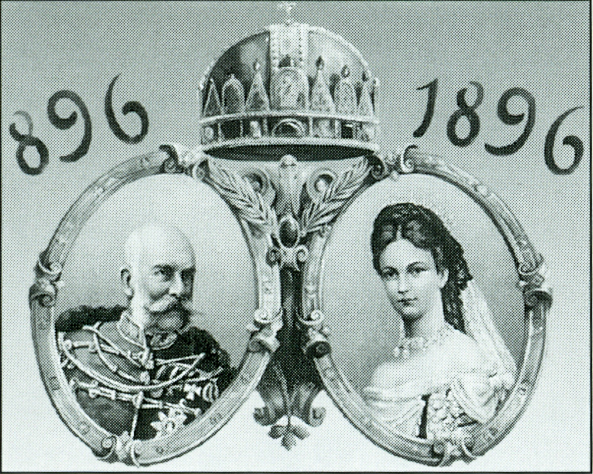
Austrian Emperor Franz Joseph I and Empress Elisabeth

Kaiser (/ˈkaɪzə/ KY-zə; German pronunciation: [ˈkaɪzɐ]) is the title historically used by German and Austrian emperors in the Holy Roman Empire. In German, the title in principle applies to rulers anywhere in the world above the rank of king (König). In English, the word kaiser is mainly applied to the emperors of the unified German Empire (1871–1918) and the emperors of the Austrian Empire (1804–1918). During the First World War, anti-German sentiment was at its zenith; the term kaiser—especially as applied to Wilhelm II—thus gained considerable negative connotations in English-speaking countries.

Especially in Central Europe, between northern Italy and southern Poland, between western Austria and western Ukraine and in Bavaria, Emperor Franz Joseph I is still associated with Der Kaiser (the emperor) today. As a result of his long reign from 1848 to 1916 and the associated Golden Age before the First World War, this title often has still a very high historical respect in this geographical area.

== Etymology and language usage ==
Kaiser is directly derived from the Roman emperors' title of Caesar, which in turn is derived from the personal name of the Julii Caesares, a branch of the gens (clan) Julia, to which Gaius Julius Caesar, the forebear of the Julio-Claudian dynasty, belonged. It has been suggested, on the grounds of an anecdote reported in e.g. Suetonius (Divus Julius 79.2), that Caesar himself once used his cognomen by way of a title; but this is ultimately unlikely.

Although the British monarchs styled "Emperor of India" were also called Kaisar-i-Hind in Hindi and Urdu, this word, although ultimately sharing the same Latin origin, is derived from the Persian Kaysar, not the German Kaiser.

Kaiserwetter (Weather of the emperor) is a colloquial expression and means in German "Sunny weather" with a deep blue, cloudless sky. According to Duden, this proverb goes back to the mostly bright sunshine on 18 August, the birthday of Emperor Franz Joseph I of Austria. Kaiserschmarrn (Emperor's Mess) is a lightly sweetened pancake that takes its name also from Franz Joseph I. Also with the Austrian Kaisersemmel ("Kaiser roll"), Kaiserfleisch ("Kaiser meat") or Kaisersuppe ("Kaiser soup") the word kaiser is supposed to denote the ultimate highest increase, the best of its kind. Kaiserjäger and Kaiserschützen were special elite units of the Imperial and Royal (k.u.k.) Austro-Hungarian Armed Forces, especially expressed by the part of the name Kaiser.

Der Kaiser is the nickname of both Franz Beckenbauer, a German football icon, active in the 1960s and 1970s who captained West Germany to the 1974 World Cup title, and of the Austrian ski racer and 1976 Olympic champion Franz Klammer - the second is an allusion to the Austrian Kaiser Franz I.

== German history and antecedents of the title ==
The Holy Roman Emperors called themselves Kaiser, combining the imperial title with that of King of the Romans (assumed by the designated heir before the imperial coronation); they saw their rule as a continuation of that of the Roman Emperors and used the title derived from the title Caesar to reflect their supposed heritage. From 1452 to 1806, except for the years 1742–1745, only members of the Habsburg family were "Holy Roman Emperors".

In 1806, the Holy Roman Empire was dissolved, but the title of kaiser was retained by the House of Habsburg, the head of which, beginning in 1804, bore the title of Kaiser of Austria. After 1273, the Habsburgs provided most of Holy Roman Kings or Emperors, so they saw themselves as legitimate heirs to the title they adopted. Despite Habsburg ambitions, however, the Austrian Empire could no longer claim to rule over most of Germany, although they did rule over large areas of lands inhabited by non-Germans in addition to Austria. According to the historian Friedrich Heer, the Austrian Habsburg emperor remained an "auctoritas" of a special kind. He was "the grandson of the Caesars", he remained the patron of the holy church, but without excluding other religions. In this tradition, the Austrian emperor saw himself as the protector of his peoples, minorities and all religious communities. In this regard, minorities in the Habsburg Monarchy, but also the Jews on the one hand and the Muslims on the other hand were particularly loyal to the emperor (German: "kaisertreu").

In 1867 the Austrian Empire was divided into the state of Austria-Hungary (the so-called Danube Monarchy), with Franz Joseph I, like his successor Karl I, being Emperor of Austria and King of Hungary. As a result of this centuries-long uninterrupted tradition, today family members of the Habsburgs are often referred to as Imperial Highnesses (German: Kaiserliche Hoheit) and, for example, the members of the Imperial and Royal Order of Saint George as Imperial Knights. There were four kaisers of the Austrian Empire who all belonged to the Habsburg dynasty. They had an official list of crowns, titles, and dignities (Grand title of the emperor of Austria).

The kaisers of the Austrian Empire (1804–1918) were:

- Franz I (1804–1835);
- Ferdinand I (1835–1848);
- Franz Joseph I (1848–1916);
- Karl I (1916–1918).

Karl von Habsburg is currently the head of the House of Habsburg.

With the unification of Germany (aside from Austria) in 1871, there was some debate about the exact title for the monarch of those German territories (such as free imperial cities, principalities, duchies, and kingdoms) that agreed to unify under the leadership of Prussia, thereby forming the new German Empire. The first kaiser himself preferred either Kaiser von Deutschland ("Emperor of Germany"). In the end, his chancellor Bismarck's choice Deutscher Kaiser ("German Emperor") was adopted as it simply connoted that the new emperor, hearkening from Prussia, was a German, but did not imply that this new emperor had dominion over all German territories, especially since the Austrian kaiser would have been offended as Austria, inhabited by Germans, was still considered part of the German lands. There were only three kaisers of the (second) German Empire. All of them belonged to the Hohenzollern dynasty, which, as kings of Prussia, and had been de facto leaders of lesser Germany (Germany excluding Austria).

The kaisers of the German Empire (1871–1918) were:

- Wilhelm I (1871–1888);
- Friedrich III (9 March – 15 June 1888), who ruled for 99 days;
- Wilhelm II (1888–1918), during whose reign the monarchy in Germany ended near the end of World War I.

Georg Friedrich Ferdinand, Prince of Prussia, is currently head of the House of Hohenzollern, which was the former ruling dynasty of the German Empire and the Kingdom of Prussia.

== See also ==
- Austrian nobility
- German monarchy
- German nobility
- Kaiserlich und Königlich, a German term which translates to Imperial and Royal
- Kaiserjäger
- Kaiserschmarrn
- Kaiserschützen
- Kayser-i Rûm
- Qaisar
