= Kaiser (Martian crater) =

Crater on Mars

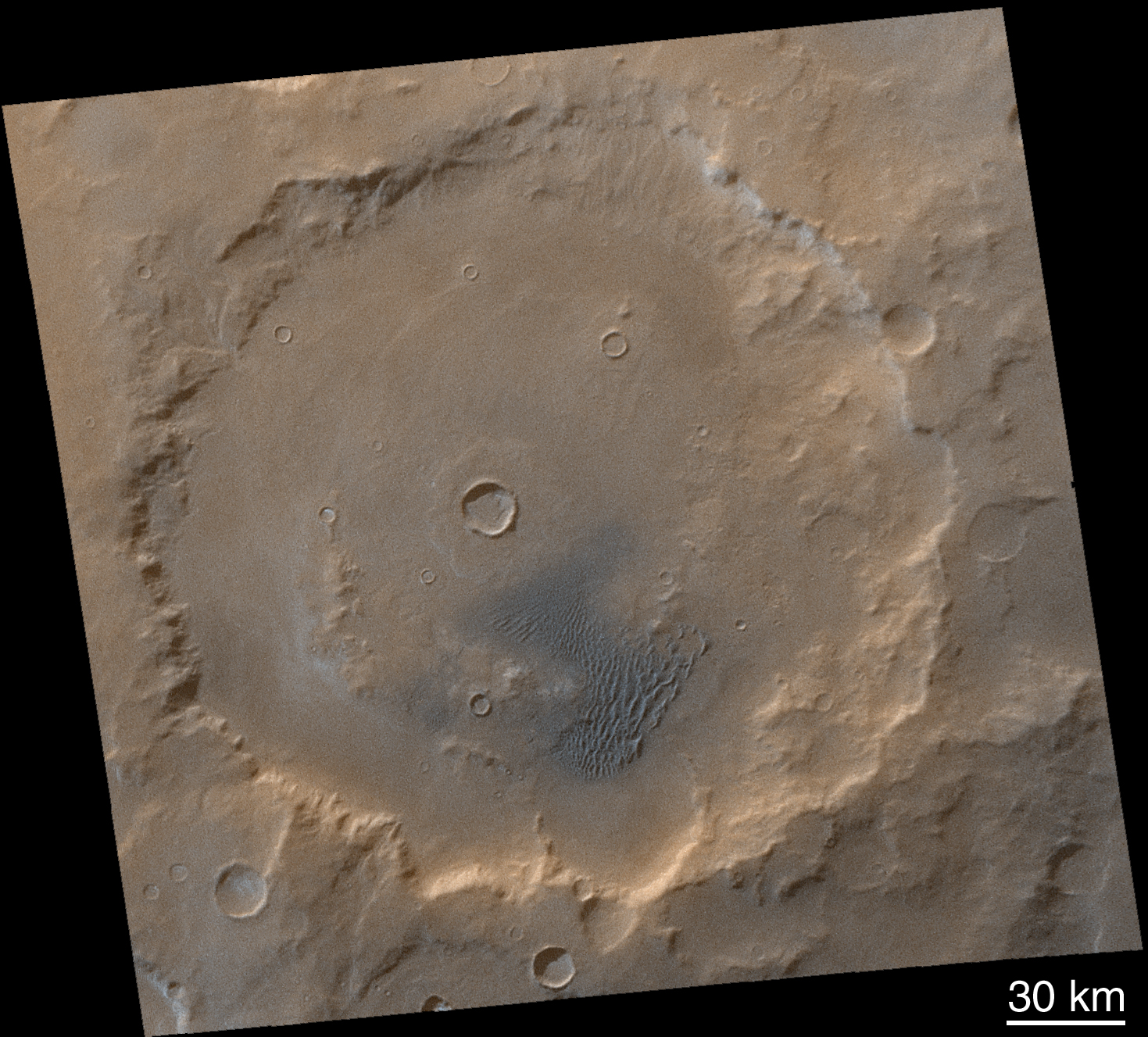
- MGS image
- Planet: Mars
- Coordinates: 46.6°S 340.9°W
- Quadrangle: Noachis
- Diameter: 201.67 km (125.31 mi)
- Eponym: Frederik Kaiser

Kaiser is a crater in the Noachis quadrangle of Mars, located at 46.6° S and 340.9° W. It was named in 1973 after Frederik Kaiser, a Dutch astronomer (1808–1872). Debris flows have been observed on some of the dunes in this crater. Some researchers believe that they may be caused by liquid water. Liquid water could be stable for short periods of time in the summer in the southern hemisphere of Mars. These gully-like debris flows may be denivation features caused by small amounts of ice melting. The dunes have been observed multiple times at high resolution by Mars Reconnaissance Orbiter and are actively eroding in the present day.

Within Kaiser is the small crater Moni.

== Images ==
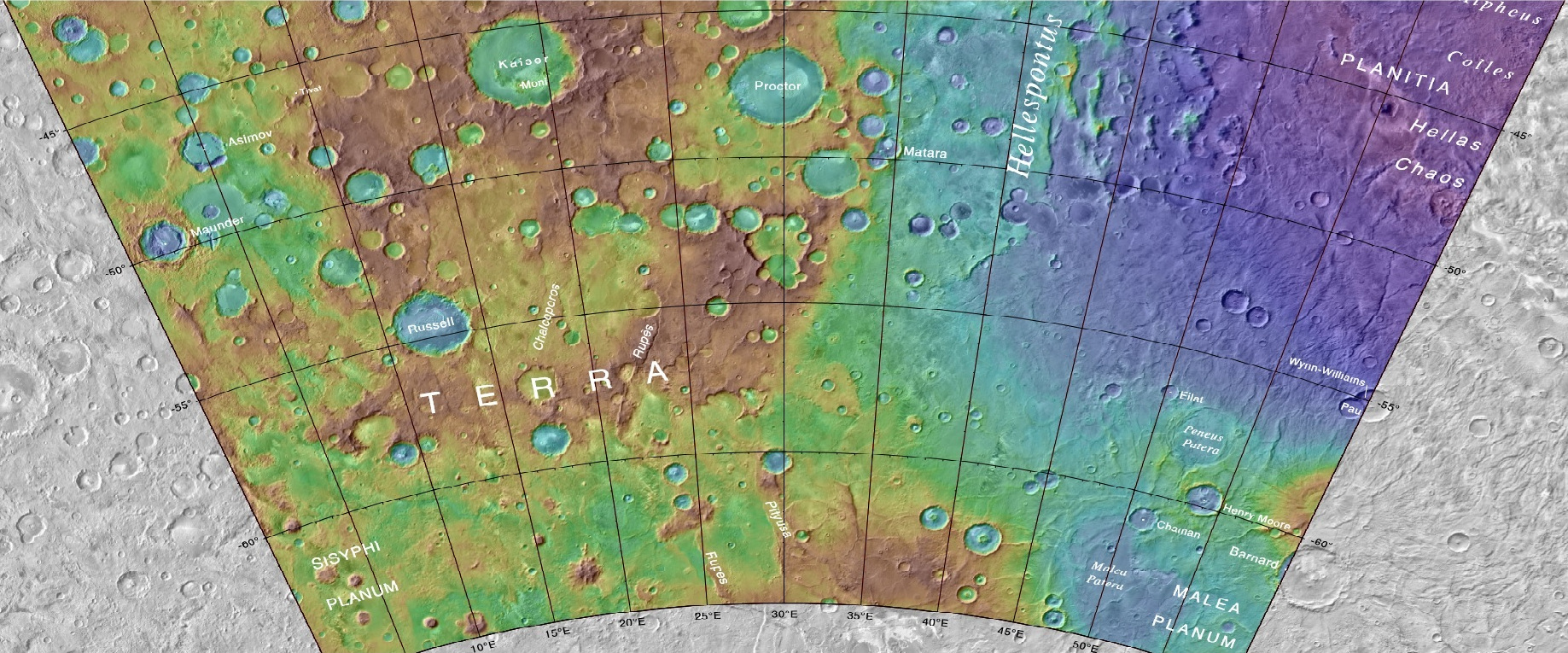
Topographical map showing location of Kaiser Crater and other nearby craters

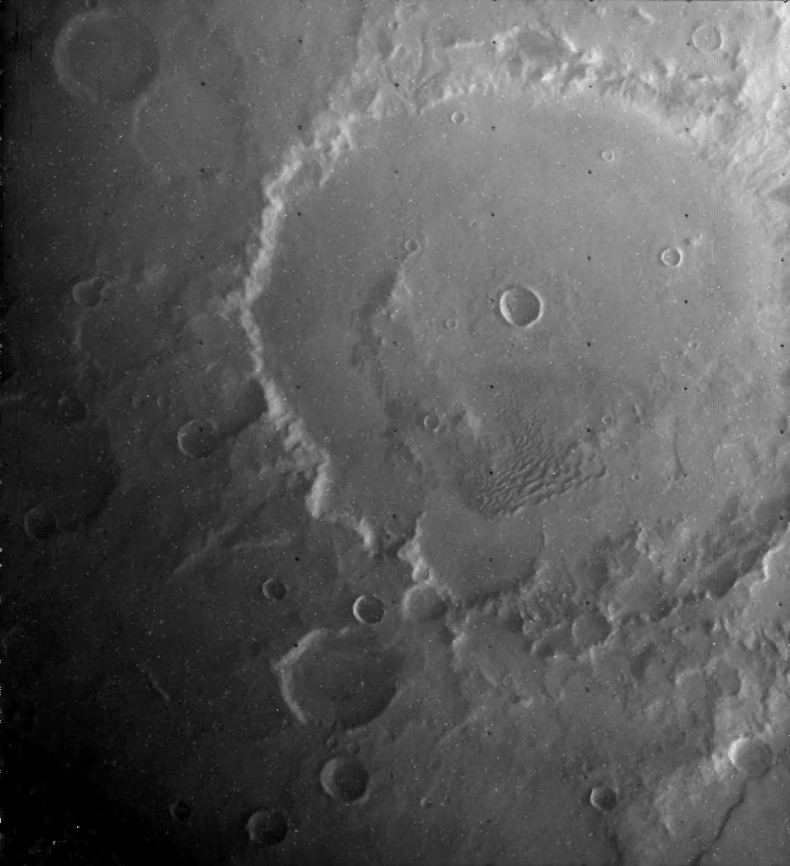
Viking Orbiter image of Kaiser

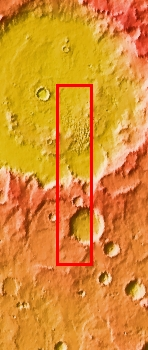
Kaiser (large crater in upper part of image); context for THEMIS image.

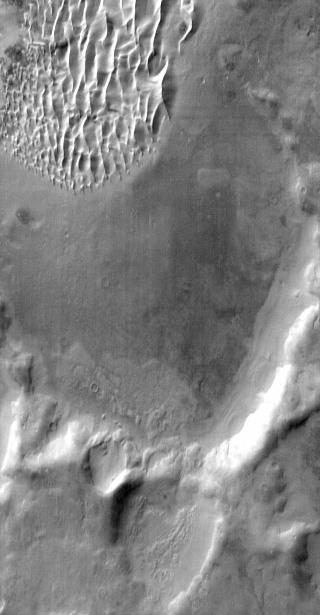
Detail of south wall of Kaiser, daytime infrared, imaged by the Thermal Emission Imaging System on board the 2001 Mars Odyssey orbiter.

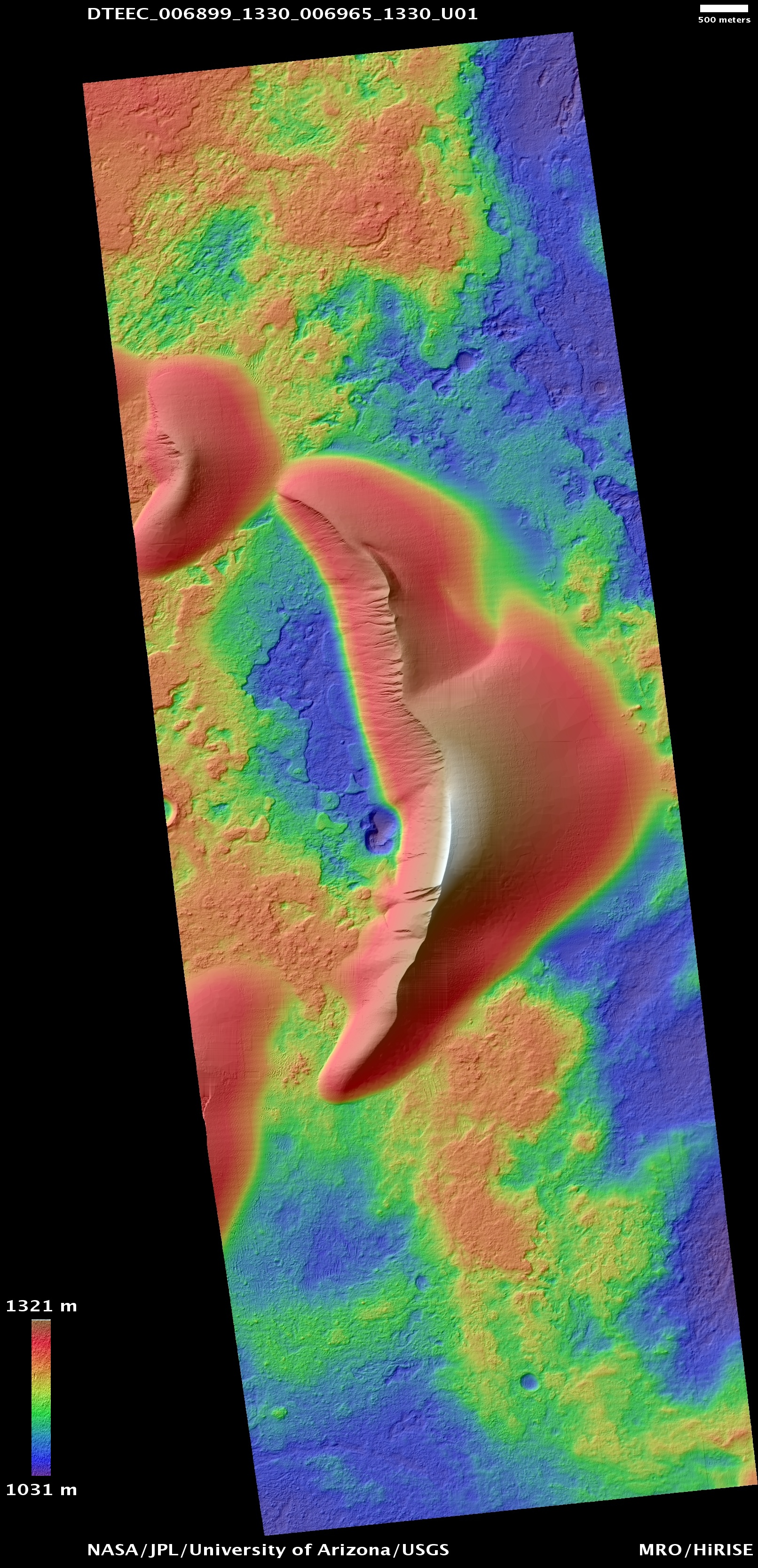
Digital terrain model of a barchan dune in Kaiser showing slip face avalanche features.

== See also ==
- List of craters on Mars
