= Enamul Haque Mostafa Shahid =

Bangladeshi politician (1938–2016)

- Born: 28 March 1938; Kutirgaon, Bengal Presidency, British India (now in Chunarughat Upazila, Habiganj District, Bangladesh)
- Died: 25 February 2016 (aged 77); Dhaka, Bangladesh
- Occupation: Politician

Enamul Haque Mostafa Shahid (28 March 1938 – 25 February 2016) is a Bangladeshi politician and minister of social welfare in the government of Bangladesh. He was awarded Ekushey Padak in 2013.

== Career ==
Shahid was elected parliament member four times with Bangladesh Awami League ticket from the Habiganj-4 constituency. He served as the Social Welfare Minister from 6 January 2009 to 14 March 2014.
