= Qaisar =

Name list

- Gender: Male

Origin
- Origin: Latin, Arabic, Persian, Turkic

Other names
- Related names: Caesar, Kaiser, Qaiser, Kaisar, Kayser, Keiser, Keyser

Qaisar (Arabic: قيصر), also spelled Qaysar, is the Arabic version of the name Caesar and it is used as a given name in Arabia and the Islamic world. The word 'Caesar' derives from the cognomen of the Roman dictator Julius Caesar. The Roman and later Byzantine, or Eastern Roman, emperors were called Qaisar-e-Rum (Caesar of Rome) by the Arabs and Persians. The Ottoman Sultan Fâtih Sultan Mehmed also took the title Kayser-i Rum (Caesar of Rome, meaning the Eastern Roman Empire) after conquering Constantinople, modern Istanbul, on May 29, 1453. The British monarchs also used the title Kaisar-i-Hind or Emperor of India during the late 19th and early 20th-century.

== Notable people ==
Surname

- Anum Qaisar (born 1992), Scottish politician
- Iftikhar Qaisar (1956–2017), Pakistani actor, poet and drama writer
- Syed Mohammad Qaisar (1940–2022), Bangladeshi politician

Given name

- Qaisar Abbas Khan Magsi (born 1965), Pakistani politician
- Qaisar Hameed (born 1950), Iraqi footballer
- Qaisar Shafi, Pakistani-American theoretical physicist

== See also ==
- Qaisar Bagh, "Emperor's Garden" in Lucknow, India
