= Shah Jalal (disambiguation) =

Shah Jalal is a celebrated Sufi Muslim figure in Bengal.

Shah Jalal or Shahjalal may also refer to:

- Shahjalal International Airport, in Dhaka, Bangladesh
- Shahjalal Uposhahar, a neighborhood in Sylhet, Bangladesh
  - Shah Jalal Dargah
  - 2004 Shah Jalal bombing
  - Shahjalal University of Science and Technology
- Shah Jalal Mosque, Cardiff, Wales

== See also ==
- Shah Jalal Dakhini, a 15th-century Sufi Muslim figure of eastern Bengal
