= Abdullah Shirazi =

Syed Mir Abdullah Shirazi

Faujdar of Sylhet Sarkar
- In office 1699
- Monarch: Aurangzeb
- Governor: Azim-ush-Shan
- Preceded by: Ahmad Majid
- Succeeded by: Karguzar Khan

Syed Mir Abdullah Shirazi (Bengali: সৈয়দ মীর আব্দুল্লাহ শিরাজী, Persian: سید میر عبد الله شیرازی), was a Faujdar of Mughal Bengal's Sylhet Sarkar during the reign of Emperor Aurangzeb and governorship of Subahdar Azim-ush-Shan. He was the successor of Ahmad Majid. The name Shirazi suggests that he is a Persian and originates from the Iranian city of Shiraz. He may also have been a relative of Lutfullah Shirazi, who was the Faujdar of Sylhet in 1663. In 1699 (1110 Hijri), Abdullah built a large domed mosque in Shah Jalal's dargah complex towards the south.

The ruins of this mosque can be seen, located just east of the dargah pond. A Persian inscription was found near the ruins detailing the mosque's construction and mentions Shirazi's background. An inscription next to a mosque situated next to the dargah of Shah Paran states that it was built by a certain Abdullah and Syed Murtaza Ali states that it is possible that they are both the same person. He was succeeded by Karguzar Khan.

== Gallery ==
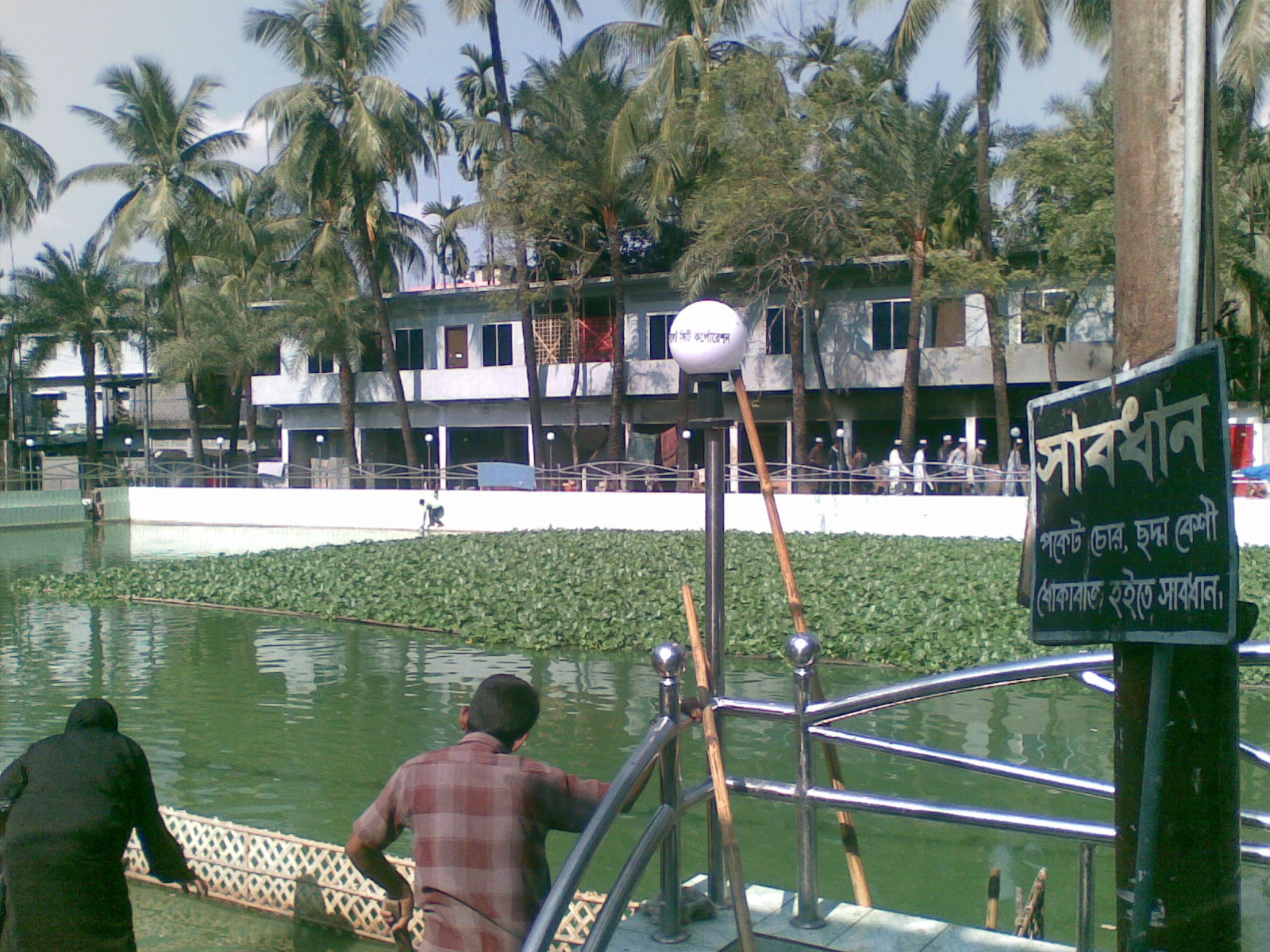
The pond in the dargah complex of Shah Jalal in Sylhet.

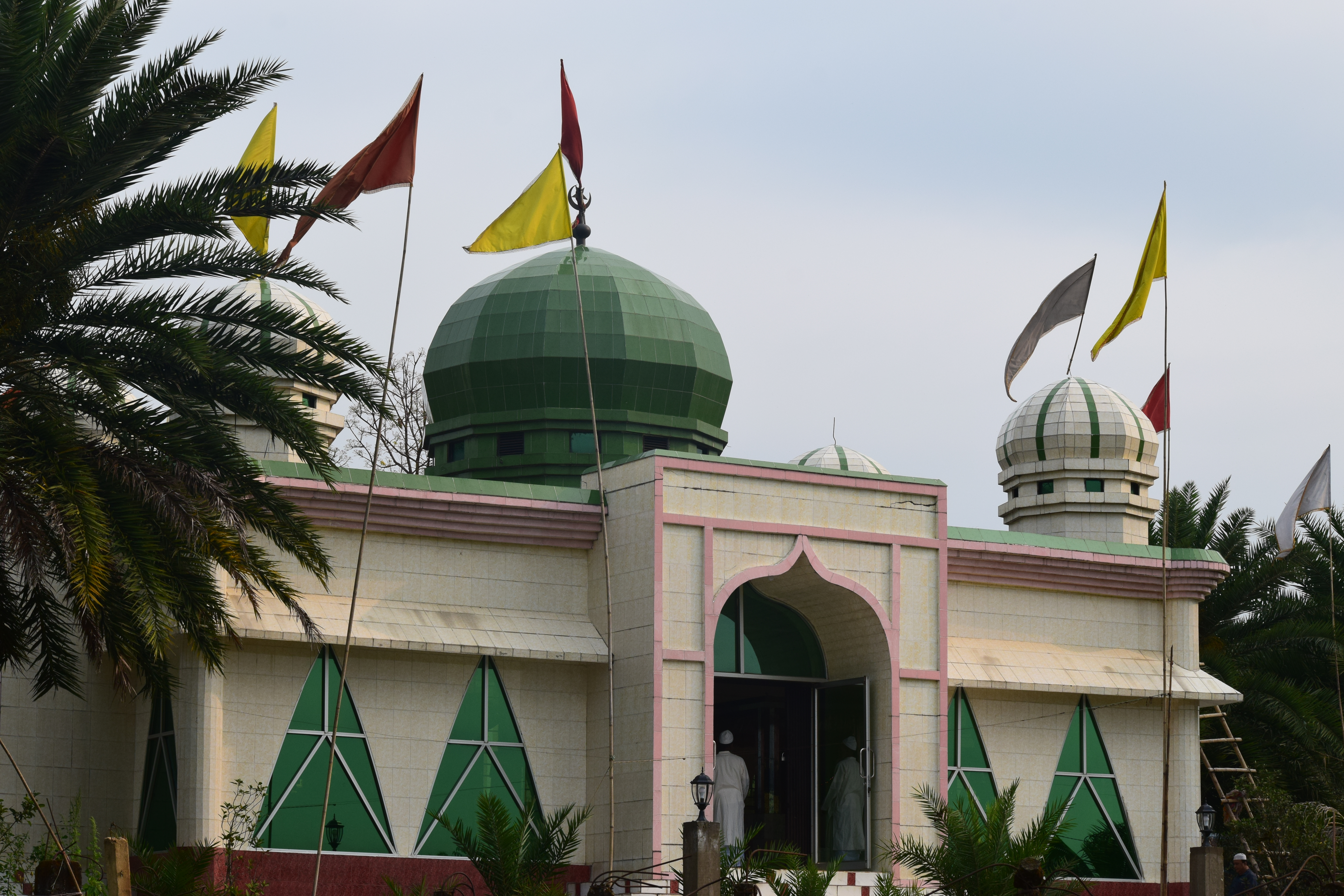
A mosque rebuilt more recently next to the dargah of Shah Paran.

== See also ==
- History of Sylhet
- Sikandar Khan Ghazi

Political offices
Preceded by Ahmad Majid	Faujdar of Sylhet; 1699	Succeeded by Karguzar Khan
