= Shah Jalal =

Sufi Muslim saint (1271–1346)

Sheikh al-Mashāʾikh Makhdūm Shāh Jalāl Mujarrad Kunyāʾī
- শাহজালাল
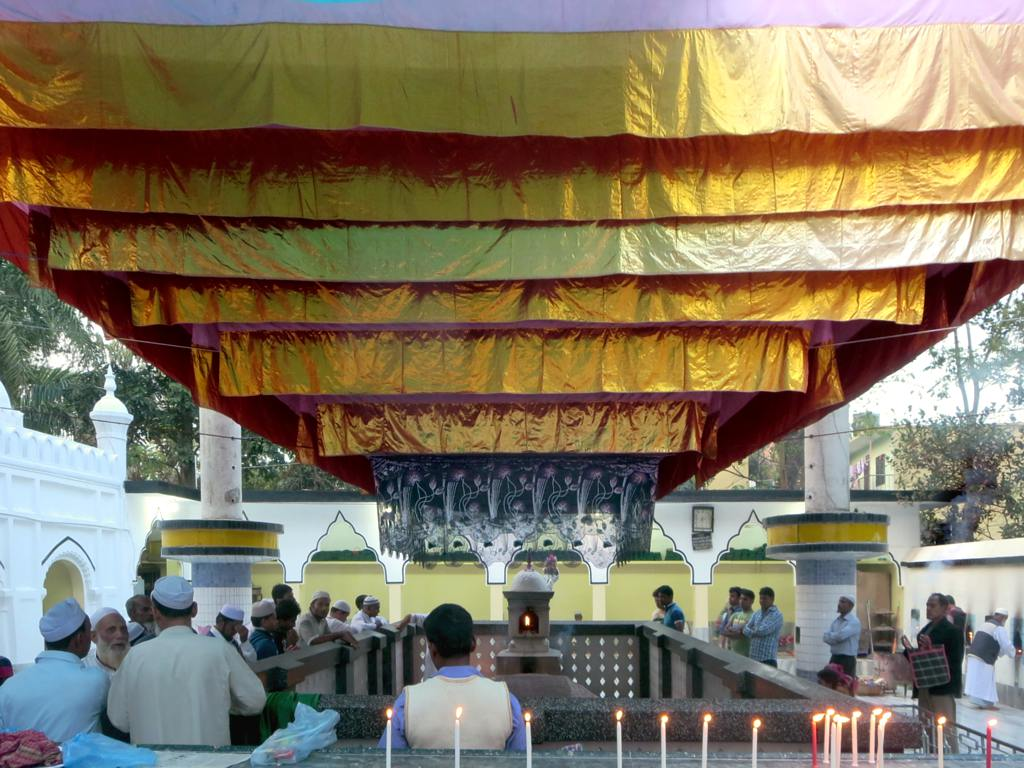
- Shah Jalal's grave in the Shah Jalal Dargah, Sylhet

Personal life
- Born: 25 May 1271 Disputed, see below
- Died: 15 March 1346 (aged 74) Sylhet (now in Bangladesh)
- Resting place: Shah Jalal Dargah
- Parents: Sayyid Mahmud ibn Muhammad ibn Ibrahim (father); Sayyidah Haseenah Fatimah (mother)
- Other name: Shaykh Jalal
- Relatives: Jalaluddin Surkh-Posh Bukhari (maternal grandfather)

Religious life
- Religion: Islam
- Denomination: Sunni
- Jurisprudence: Hanafi

Muslim leader
- Based in: Jalalabad
- Post: Wali, religious leader and scholar
- Predecessor: Syed Ahmed Kabir Suhrawardi
- Successor: Shah Paran

Shāh Jalāl Mujarrad Kunyāʾī (شيخ جلال مجرد كنيائي; 25 May 1271 – 15 March 1346), popularly known as Shah Jalal (also spelled Shahjalal; Bengali: শাহজালাল, romanized: Śāhjālāl, IPA: [ˈʃaˑˈdʒalal]), was a Sufi saint, military commander and historical figure of Bengal. His name is often associated with the Muslim conquest of Sylhet and the spread of Islam into the region, part of a long history of interactions between West Asia, Central Asia, and South Asia. A complex figure among Bengali Muslims, various complexes and religious places have been named after him, including the largest airport in Bangladesh, Hazrat Shahjalal International Airport, Shahjalal University of Science and technology (SUST) and numerous mosques around the United Kingdom.

== Birthplace and origin ==
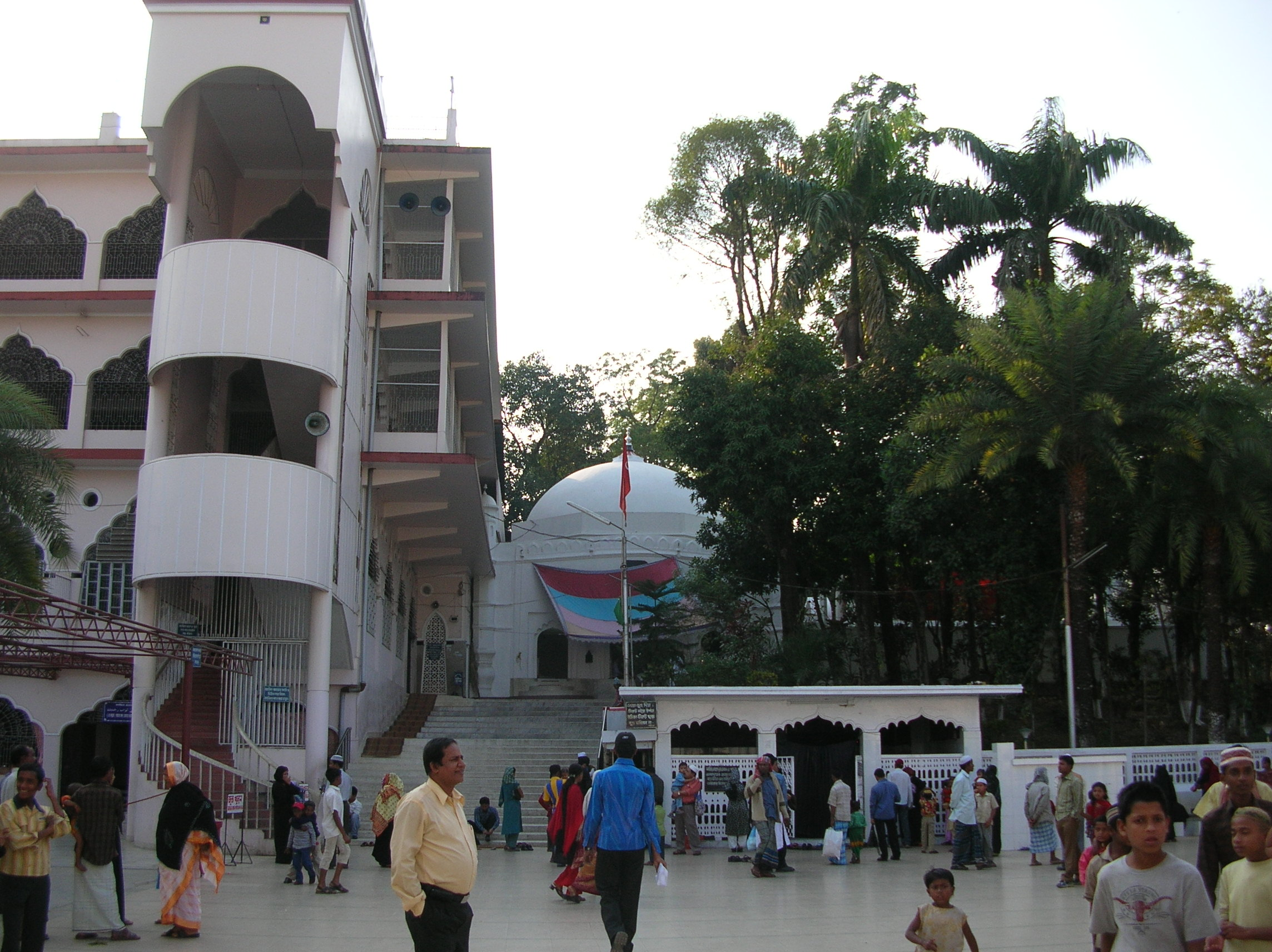
Shah Jalal Mazar Mosque

Jalal was said to have been born on May 25, 1271. Various traditions and historical documents differ in his place of birth, and there is a gap of two centuries between his life and literature which attempted to identify his origin. Local ballads and devotees continue to refer to him as Shah Jalal Yemeni, connecting him to Greater Yemen, specifically the Hadhramaut region. An inscription from circa 1505 AD, during the reign of Sultan Alauddin Husain Shah, refers to Shah Jalal with the suffix Kunyāʾī. Towards the end of this century, in 1571, Shah Jalal's biography was recorded in Shaikh ʿAli Sher Bangālī's Sharḥ Nuzhat al-Arwāḥ (Commentary on the excursion of the souls). The author was a descendant of one of Shah Jalal's senior companions, Nūr al-Hudā, and his account was also used by his teacher Muḥammad Ghawth Shattārī in his Gulzar-i-Abrār of 1613. According to this account, Shah Jalal had been born in Turkestan, where he became a spiritual disciple of Ahmad Yasawi. Muḥammad Nāṣiruddīn Ḥaydar composed a full biography of Shah Jalal titled Suhayl-i-Yaman Tārīkh-i-Jalālī in 1859, which referred to him as Yemeni. Although this was composed 5 centuries after Jalal's death, Haydar's work consulted two now-lost manuscripts; Risālah (Message) by Muḥīuddīn Khādim from 1711 and Rawḍah as-Salāṭīn (Garden of the Sultans) from 1721.

A number of scholars have claimed that the suffix from the Husain Shahi inscription refers to the city of Qūniyah (Konya) in modern-day Turkey (then in the Sultanate of Rum), and they stated further that Jalal may have possibly moved to Yemen in his later life. Others have linked the suffix to the village of Kaninah in Yemen's Hadhramaut region, and some even to Kenya in East Africa.

== Early life and education ==
Shah Jalal's mother, Syeda Haseenah Fatimah, and his father, Sayyid Mahmud ibn Muhammad ibn Ibrahim, are claimed to be descendants of the Quraysh tribe in Makkah. His mother was the daughter of Jalaluddin Surkh-Posh Bukhari. Jalal's father was a cleric and contemporary of the Sufi mystic Rumi and died five years after his son's birth. Jalal was educated and raised by his maternal uncle, Syed Ahmad Kabir Suhrawardi in Makkah. He excelled in his studies; became a hafiz and mastered fiqh. He became a makhdoom, teacher of Sunnah and, for performing prayers in solitary milieu and leading a secluded life as an ascetic, al Mujarrad was post-fixed to his name. It is claimed he achieved spiritual perfection (Kamaliyyat) after 30 years of study, practice and meditation.

== Travel to South Asia ==
Jalal's maternal uncle, Syed Ahmad Kabir, gave him a handful of soil and asked him to travel to the Indian subcontinent. He instructed him to choose to settle and spread Dawah in any place in India where the soil exactly matches that which he gave him in smell and colour. Shah Jalal journeyed eastward from Makkah and met many great scholars and Sufi mystics. Sheikh Ali of Yemen gave up his duty as a prince to join Jalal on his expedition. Many people joined Jalal from the Arabian Peninsula including his nephew Shah Paran. Jalal also came across Sheikh Chashni Pir, a pedologist who would check the soil of the places that Shah Jalal would visit in order to find the matching soil given by Sheikh Ahmad Kabir. Jalal passed through Baghdad and was present there during the time of the murder of the last Abbasid caliph Al-Musta'sim in 1258. Driven off by the Mongol invasion of Baghdad, they continued journeying to the east.

Jalal reached Uch in the Punjab, where he and many of his companions were initiated into the Sufi order of Suhrawardiyya. Jalal was joined by many other disciples throughout his journey. He passed through Delhi where he was made a guest of the Sufi saint Nizamuddin Auliya. Nizamuddin offered him a gift of two rare pigeons which would later be called Jalali Kobutor (Pigeons of Jalal). It is said that these pigeons continue to breed and its descendants remain around Jalal's dargah.

== Conquest of Sylhet ==
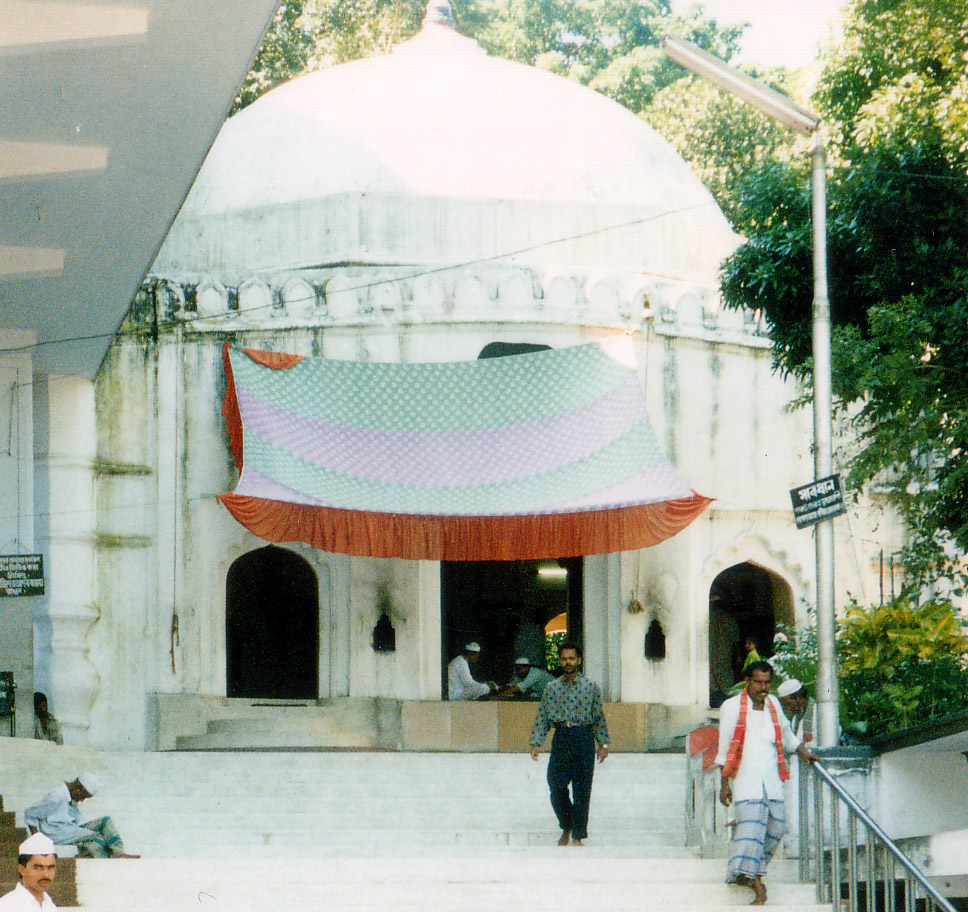
Tomb of Hazrat Shah Jalal in Sylhet

In 1303, Sultan Shamsuddin Firoz Shah of Lakhnauti was engaged in a war with the neighbouring Gour Kingdom in the Sylhet region, then under the rule of the Hindu king Gour Govinda. This began when Shaykh Burhanuddin, a Muslim living in Sylhet, sacrificed a cow for his newborn son's aqiqah (birth celebration). Govinda, in a fury for what he saw as sacrilege, had the newborn killed as well as having Burhanuddin's right hand cut off.

When word of this reached Sultan Firoz Shah, an army commanded by his nephew, Sikandar Khan and later his Sipah Salar (Commander-in-chief) Syed Nasiruddin, was sent against Gour. Three successive strikes were attempted, all ending in failure due to the Bengali armies inexperience in the foreign terrain as well as Govinda's superior military strategy.

A fourth attack, now with the aid of Shah Jalal and his companions (at this point numbering 360) was undertaken. Jalal may have been summoned by Firoz Shah for aid after the initial failed attacks against Gour Govinda. Alternatively, he may already have been present in Sylhet, fighting against the Hindu king independently prior to being approached by the Sultan. The combined Muslim forces ultimately claimed victory against Gour. Govinda was forced to retreat and Sylhet was brought under Muslim control. According to tradition, Shah Chashni Pir at this point compared the soil in Sylhet with that which was previously given to Jalal by his uncle, finding them to be identical. In any case, following the battle, Jalal and his followers settled in Sylhet.

A Persian inscription from 1303 has since been discovered in Jalal's dargah. It mentioned Sikandar's victory in Arsah Srihat with the aid of the saint during the reign of Firoz Shah. This inscription can now be found in Bangladesh National Museum.

== Later life ==
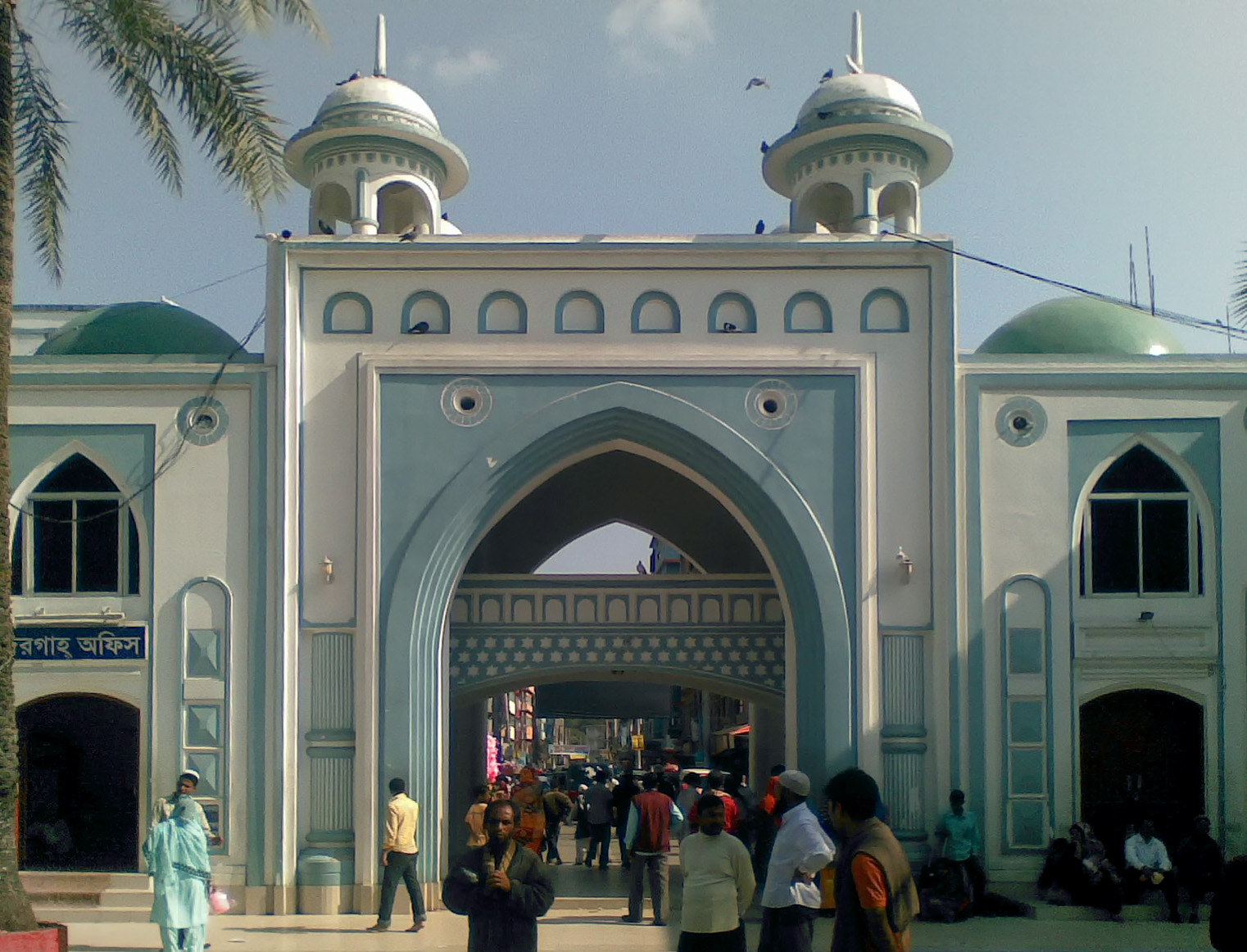
Hazrat Shahjalal Majar Exit Gate

During the later stages of his life, Jalal devoted himself to propagating Islam. The famous traveller Ibn Battuta, then in Satgaon, made a one-month journey through the mountains of Kamarupa, north-east of Sylhet, to meet him. On his way to Sylhet via Habung, Ibn Battuta was greeted by several of Jalal's disciples who had come to assist him on his journey many days before he had arrived. At the meeting in 1345, Ibn Battuta noted that Shah Jalal was tall and lean, fair in complexion and lived by the mosque in a cave, where his only item of value was a goat he kept for milk, butter, and yogurt. He observed that the companions of Shah Jalal were foreign and known for their strength and bravery. He also mentions that many people would visit Jalal to seek guidance. He recalls:

This shaikh was one of the great saints and one of the unique personalities. He had to his credit miracles (karamat) well known to the public as well as great deeds, and he was a man of hoary age. . . . The inhabitants of these mountains had embraced Islam at his hands, and for this reason he stayed amidst them.

The meeting between Ibn Battuta and Shah Jalal is described in his Arabic travelogue, Rihla (The Journey).

Even today in Hadramaut, Yemen, Jalal's name is established in folklore.

The exact date of his death is debated, but he is reported by Ibn Battuta to have died on 20 Dhul Qa'dah 746 AH (15 March 1346 CE). He was buried in Sylhet in his dargah (tomb), which is located in a neighbourhood now known as Dargah Mahalla. Whether or not he has descendants is debated. He appointed his closest companion, Haji Muhammad Yusuf to be the khadim (guardian) of his dargah and Yusuf's descendants, the Sareqaum family, continue to have this role.

Where he lies, a soul eternal,
The much-loved awliya of Allah, Hazrat Shah Jalal.

His shrine is famous in Sylhet and throughout Bangladesh, with hundreds of Muslims devotees visiting daily. He is buried next to four of his companions. The ex-Prince of Yemen, Shahzada Sheikh Ali to his south, Haji Yusuf to his east and Haji Khalil and Haji Dariya both to his west. The largest mosque in Sylhet was built at the Dargah (also one of the largest in Bangladesh).

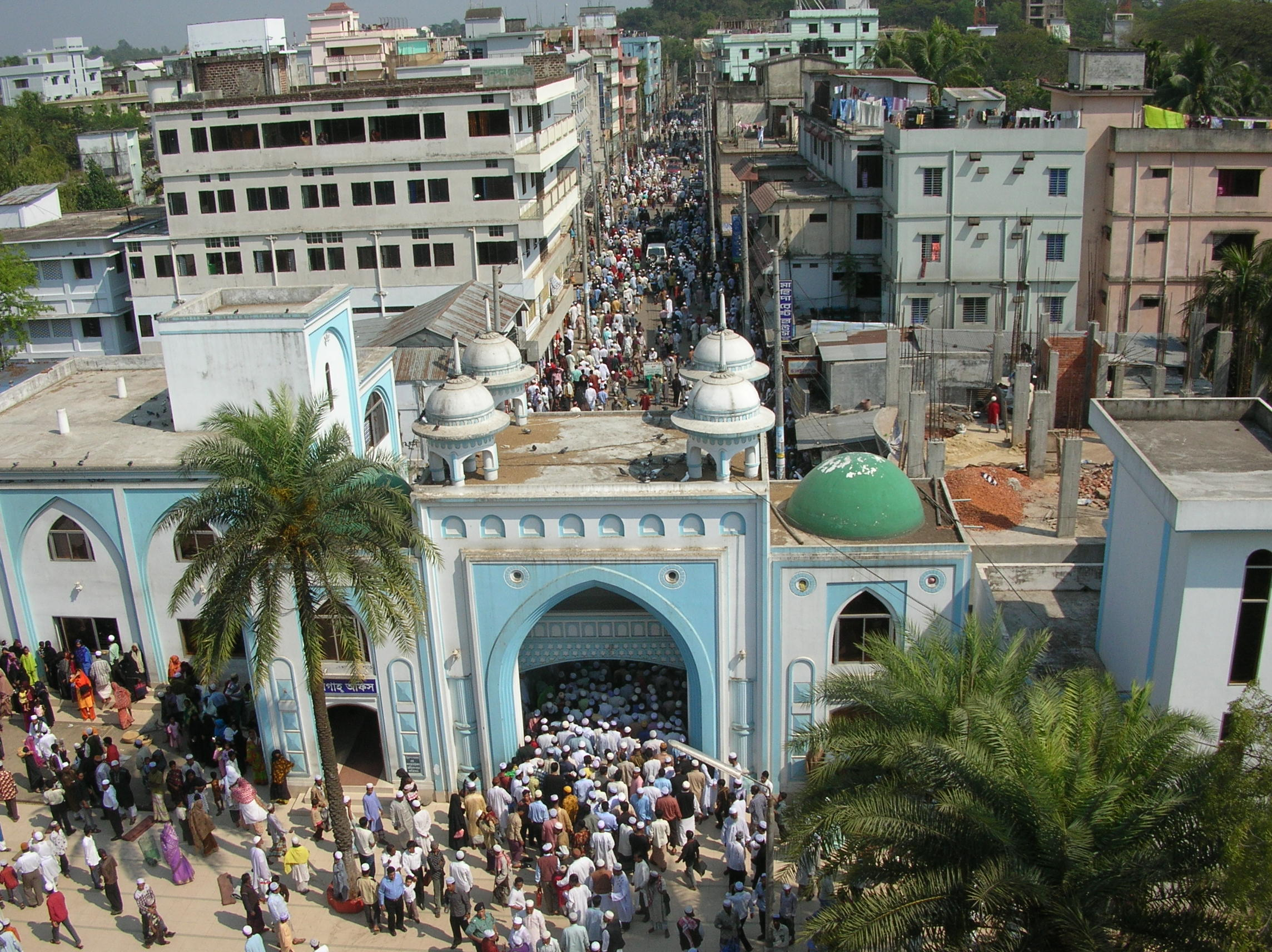
Shah Jalal's Masjid

== Spiritual genealogy ==
Spiritual genealogy of Shah Jalal is as follows:

- Imam Ali Al Hadi (10th shia imam and a grand scholar amongst Suhrwardiy tradition)
- Syed Jaffar Al Zaki
- Syed Ali Al Askar Al Nazuk
- Syed Abdullah Al Nazuk
- Syed Ahmed Al Nazuk (migrated to Mashhad from Samarrah Iraq
- Syed Mehmood Bukhari (migrated to Bukhara
- Syed Muhammad Abu Al Fateh
- Syed Jaffar Ameer
- Syed Ali Al Moeed
- Jalaluddin Surkh-Posh Bukhari
- Syed Ahmad Kabir Suhrawardi Hussaini Jalali
- Shah Jalal

== Eponyms ==
- Jalalabad, a historical name of Sylhet
  - Jalalabad Ragib-Rabeya Medical College, private medical school
  - Jalalabad Cantonment, Bangladesh Army military quarter
    - Jalalabad Cantonment Public School and College
- Shahjalal Fertiliser Factory, Bangladesh's largest fertiliser factory, located in Fenchuganj
- Shah Jalal High School, secondary school in Jagannathpur
- Hazrat Shahjalal International Airport, Bangladeshi airport in Dhaka; nation's largest international gateway
- Shahjalal Islami Bank Limited, private commercial bank
- Shah Jalal Mosque & Islamic Cultural Centre, grade II listed mosque located in Cardiff, United Kingdom
- Shahjalal University of Science and Technology, Bangladeshi public university located in Sylhet
- Shahjalal Uposhahar, a neighbourhood in Ward 22, Sylhet
- Shahjalal Hall, University of Chittagong

== Companions ==
1. Syed Nasiruddin, army commander of Shamsuddin Firuz Shah (Chowkidekhi, Sylhet)
2. Haydar Ghazi, second wazir of Sylhet (Sonargaon)
3. Haji Yusuf, remained with Shah Jalal in Chowkidighi
4. Ghazi Burhanuddin, first Muslim of Sylhet (Tultikar/Burhanabad, Ward 24)
5. Shah Paran, his nephew (Khadimnagar, Sylhet Sadar)
6. Adam Khaki (Deorail, Badarpur)
7. Shah Malum (Rajonpur, Fenchuganj)
8. Shah Gabru (Gabhurteki, Osmani Nagar)
9. Shah Siddiq (Panchpara, Osmani Nagar)
10. Fateh Ghazi (Fatehpur-Shahjibazar, Madhabpur)
11. Pir Gorachand (Haroa, North 24 Parganas, West Bengal)
12. Shah Athar Ali (Moskapur, Golapganj, Sylhet)
13. Syed Nasrot Shah (Nasrotpur, Shayestagonj)

== See also ==
- Muhammad bin Bakhtiyar Khalji
- Moinuddin Chishti
- Sikandar Khan Ghazi
- Nizamuddin Auliya, his spiritual friend also gave him two pairs of black pigeons, later named Jalali kobutor
- Syed Nasiruddin
