= Imam Ahmad =

Imam Ahmad or Ahmed may refer to:

- Ahmad ibn Ibrahim al-Ghazi (1506–1543), leader of the Adal Sultanate
- Ahmad bin Yahya (1891–1962), the penultimate king of the Mutawakkilite Kingdom of Yemen
- Ahmad ibn Hanbal (780–855), Muslim scholar and theologian
- Ahmed Raza Khan Barelvi (1856–1921), Indian Islamic scholar and poet
- Imam Ahmed Chowdhury (1926–2023), Bangladeshi career bureaucrat and adviser

== See also ==
- Imam Ahmed Stadium
