= Sareqaum =

Bengali Muslim family of the Sylhet Division

Sareqaum family সরেকওম খানদান
- Current region: Sylhet, Bangladesh
- Earlier spellings: সরকওম
- Etymology: Head (Sar) of the people (qaum)
- Founder: Haji Muhammad Yusuf
- Current head: Fatehullah Al-Aman
- Estates: Sareqaum House, Dargah-e-Shah Jalal, Sylhet

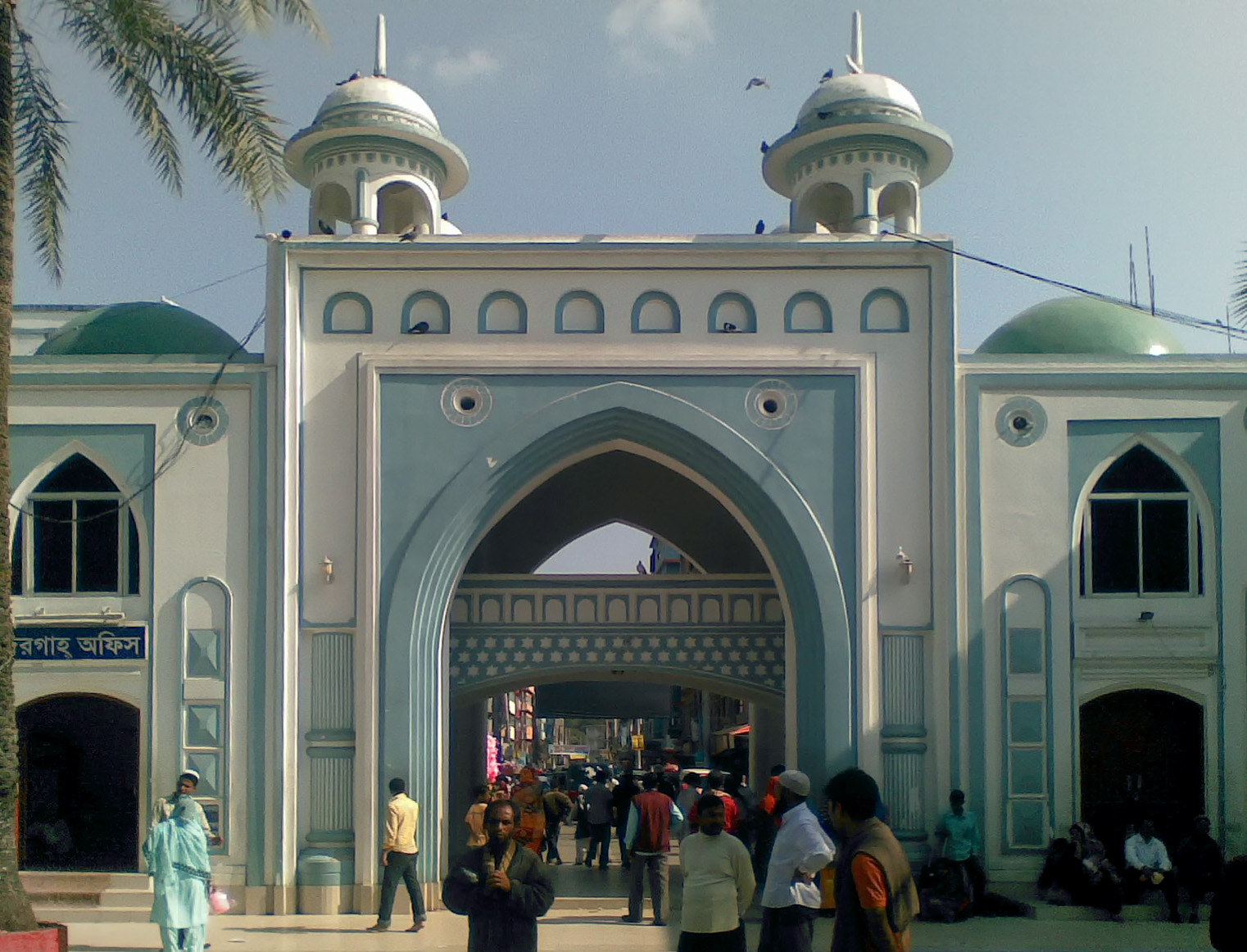
The gate of Shah Jalal's dargah complex.

The Sareqaum family (Bengali: সরেকওম খানদান) is a Bengali Muslim family of the Sylhet Division of Bangladesh. They are best known for their centuries-old role as one of the custodian families of the waqf (estate) of Shah Jalal, a 14th-century Islamic preacher whose name is commonly associated with the spread of Islam in the region. The family is the only known family in Bengal to hold the title of Sar-e-Qaum (head of the people). Some members of the family have migrated to other parts of the world, such as to the United Kingdom - which is known to host a large Bangladeshi diaspora.

== Origin ==
Following the Conquest of Sylhet in 1303, Shah Jalal ordered most of his companions, traditionally thought to have numbered above 300, to disperse to and settle in different parts of Bengal and propagate Islam in those places. Haji Yusuf was one of the companions who remained in the neighbourhood of Chowkidighi alongside Shah Jalal. At Jalal's instruction, Yusuf married a native woman who had become a Muslim. Before dying on 15 March 1346, Jalal appointed Yusuf to be the mutawalli (custodian) of his waqf (estate).

It is assumed that after Shah Jalal's death in 1346, he was buried and a tomb complex was built in his waqf estate, which was now in the control of Yusuf. Following Yusuf's own death, he was also buried within the waqf - Yusuf's tomb being located southeast of Jalal's tomb. He was succeeded by Khwaja Fayzullah, Manik Nizam Uddin, Shaykh Muhammad, and Malik Ahmad, respectively. Malik Ahmad would be succeeded by Pir Bakhsh.

== Title obtainal ==
In the 17th century, Sylhet came under the control of the Mughal Empire. The Faujdar (governor) of Sylhet, Isfandiyar Khan Beg, was known to have officially recognised the inauguration of Shaykh Pir Bakhsh as the rightful custodian of the waqf in the 1660s. Pir Bakhsh was given the title of Sar-e-Qaum (head of the people), and his descendants, the Sareqaum family, continue to hold this role. Khan also built a mosque near the dargah, and the ruins of this incomplete mosque can be seen today behind the trees near the Dargah Gateway.

During this Mughal period, a house was constructed to serve as a majlis (lounge), and it was known as the Jolsha Ghor. To the west of this house remain the graves of two custodians: Sareqaum Abu Nasr and Sareqaum Abu Nasir.

== During British rule ==
তুমি চলে গেছ দূরে আসিবেনা কভু, তোমারে খুঁজিয়া আঁখি ফিরিতেছে তবু
Tumi chole gechho doore aashibena kobhu, Tomare khujiya ankhi phiritechhe tobu
তোমার আমার মাঝে হয়েছিল যত কথা বলা, রেশটুকু আজো প্রাণে দেয় আসি দোলা
Tomar amar majhe hoyechhilo joto kotha bola, Reshtuku aajo praane dey aashi dola
সকারে, দুপুরে, সাঁঝে, নব বরষায়, যত কথা হয়েছিল তোমার আমায়
Shokare, dupure, shanjhe, nobo boroshay, Joto kotha hoyechhilo tomar amay
তাহার প্রতিটি কথা প্রতিটি চাহনি আঁধারে কাহারে খুঁজে জানিগো জানি
Tahar protiti kotha protiti chahoni, aandhare kahare khuje janigo jani
প্রতিটি নিঃশ্বাস তব এতটুকু হাসি, প্রতিদিন একই কথা তোরে ভালবাসি
Protiti nishaash tobo etotuku hashi, protidin eki kotha tore bhalobashi
তোরে ভালবাসি আমি জীবনে মরণে, জনমে জনমে মোর অবসর ক্ষণে
Tore bhalobashi ami jibone morone, jonome jonome more oboshor kkhone

— A poem written by Moulvi Sareqaum Ubaydullah.

Sareqaum Abu Torab Abdul Waheb was the head of the family in the late 1800s and was also buried next to Shah Jalal. He was succeeded by Sareqaum Abu Sayad Abd al-Hafiz and then Sareqaum Abu Zafar Abdullah.

On 16 September 1936, Bengali Muslim litterateurs gathered at the Sareqaum House, where they established the well-known literary society known as the Sylhet Central Muslim Literary Society (later branching out to become the Kendriya Muslim Sahitya Sangsad). One of the oldest literary societies in Bangladesh, its inaugural secretary was Sareqaum Abu Zafar Abdullah, a well-known Bengali writer and the Mutawalli of Shah Jalal's dargah. Other members of this society included Muhammad Nurul Haque and Syed Abdul Majid. Many of Abdullah's works were published in the popular newspapers of those times. His most famous work was Shaptak. The Sangsad, as well as its Al-Islah magazine, was based in Abdullah's property. He was a key activist during the Pakistan Movement. Abdullah's maternal cousin was the historian Nasiruddin Ahmad Chowdhury. In 1971, Abdullah started the construction of a minaret (with a clock) in the dargah complex, which was completed a few days after the independence of Bangladesh.

Moulvi Sareqaum Ubaydullah was a poet who famously wrote the Rakhaliya Bashi. From 1942, he was a member of the Sangsad. He hosted Kazi Nazrul Islam during his visit to the Sylhet region.

== Post-independence period ==
The Mutawalli Sareqaum Yusuf Amanullah, son of Abu Zafar Abdullah, was Abdullah's successor and the vice-president of the Sangsad from 1988 to 1990. In 1996, Sareqaum Ikramullah was a sponsor of the Sangsad. Amanullah died in 2013 at the age of 76 years due to illness. He had one son and four daughters, and Prime Minister Sheikh Hasina paid her respects. In the same year, the Khadim Sareqaum Yunus Ayatullah died. Sareqaum Khaled Ahmed was a director for the British Bangladesh Chamber of Commerce.

Yusuf Amanullah's successor was his son, Sareqaum Fatehullah Al-Aman. During Aman's time as Sareqaum, he was the first known custodian to have cancelled the centuries-old annual urs ceremony held at the Dargah as a result of the COVID-19 pandemic.

== See also ==
- History of Sylhet
