= Islam in Wales =

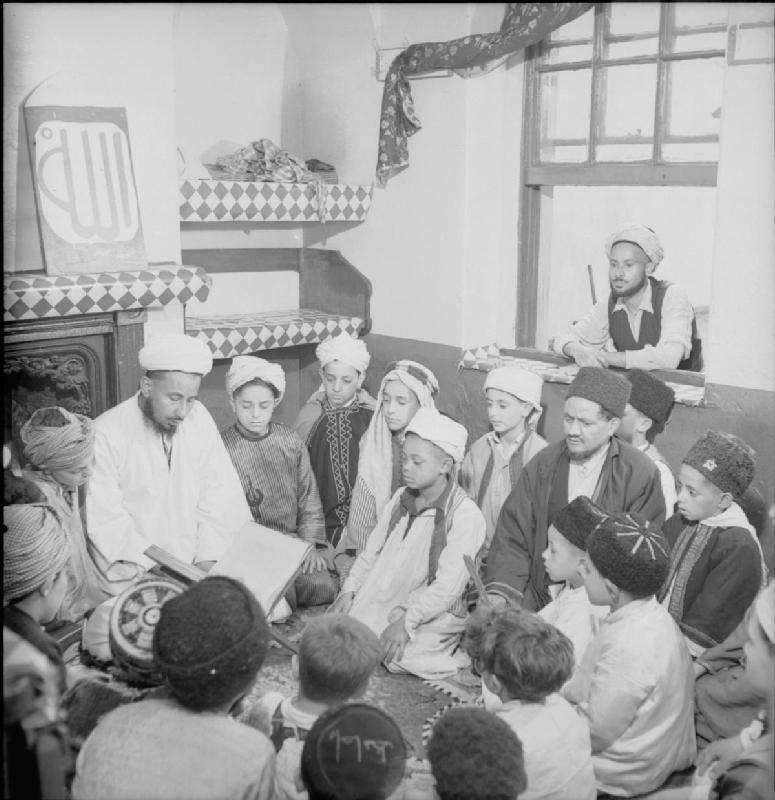
Muslim boys listen to the Quran being read in the old mosque in Butetown, Cardiff, in 1943

Islam is a minority faith followed by 2.1% of the population of Wales, making it the second most practiced religion in the country after Christianity.

Wales became home to the oldest Muslim communities in the British Isles during the early nineteenth century, with Muslim seafarers establishing their homes in the country's ports during the Industrial Revolution in Wales. However, there is also more ancient evidence of Muslim converts and Islamic influence throughout the country.

== History ==
=== Early and industrial history ===
Records of contact between Wales and the Muslim world dates back to the early 12th Century, and the early influence of Islam in Wales is evidenced by the discovery of a Quran found hidden into the walls of Valle Crucis Abbey near Llangollen. The earliest known Welsh Muslim is a seventeenth century runagado (renegade), who was captured following the seizure of an Algerian Corsair by the Dutch navy in 1671. The records state that the Dutch released all the English prisoners but executed one Welsh sailor as he was a Muslim. While nothing else is recorded of his life, it is likely that he was a Christian Welshman who was either captured or enslaved by North African pirates in the employ of the Ottoman Empire. While he may have been given few options but to convert to Islam, we know that he worked with his fellow Muslims aboard the ship, and would become not only the first Welsh Muslim in recorded history, but also the first Welshman to lose his life because of his Muslim faith.

The influence of Islam on material Welsh culture is apparent by the mid-nineteenth century, with artworks such as the stained glass windows at churches across Anglesey. The ancient Christian churches were renovated by Henry Stanley, 3rd Baron Stanley of Alderley, who had converted to Islam in 1859. As such, the churches of Llanbadrig, St Peters in Newborough, St Peters in Llanbedrgoch, St Marys in Bodewryd, St Peirios near Rhosgoch all feature Islamic geometric patterns. In the late nineteenth century Welsh language translations of the Quran were carried out by Welsh radical authors such as Joseph Harry and John Tywi Jones. A Welsh Quran was first published at Aberdare, and was again published in its entirety in two national newspapers. Firstly in Y Gwladgarwr from April to June 1879, and again in the politically radical newspaper, Tarian y Gweighirt from February to March 1882.

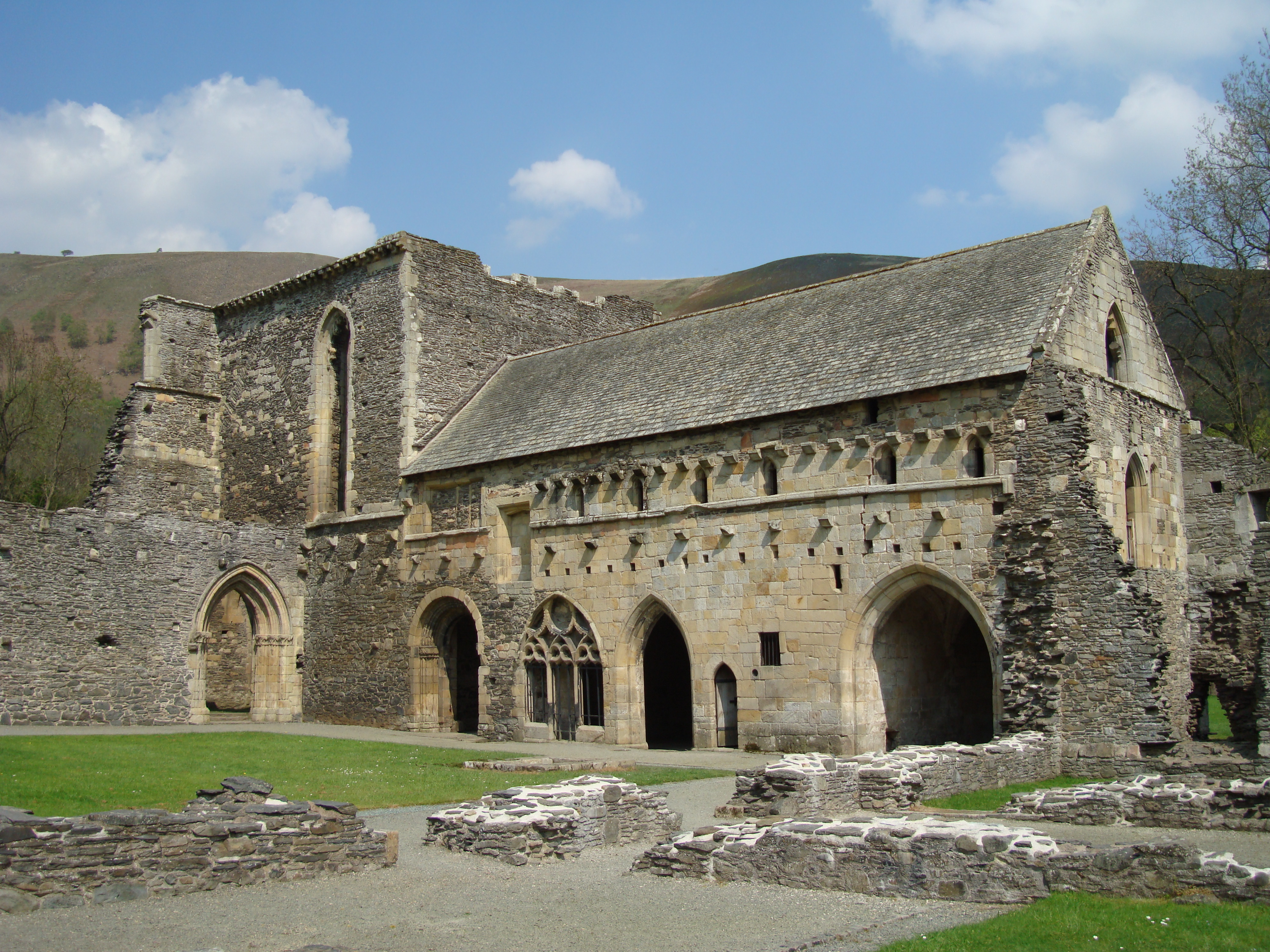
The ruins of Valle Crucis Abbey in Denbighshire, a medieval Quran was discovered here, sealed into the walls of the Abbey. Now lost, the Quran may be the earliest material evidence of Islam in Wales.

Welsh converts to Islam include Khadija Amelia Buksh (born Amelia Davies) who converted before marrying her Indian Muslim husband in 1891. Khadija died suddenly just two years later but was buried in accordance with Islamic traditions and under her Muslim name, alongside her family in Bethlehem Chapel in Pwll-Trap, St Clears, Carmarthenshire, in what is often considered to be the first Islamic burial in Wales.

Wales has been home to a sizeable Muslim population since at least the mid-nineteenth century when Muslim workers, especially Somali and Yemeni seafarers settled in the new Welsh ports, such as Swansea, Mostyn and most notably the Butetown area of Cardiff. The first purpose built mosque in Wales, the Peel Street Mosque was completed in 1947 in Cardiff. The original structure was a traditional domed structure with minarets, but was redeveloped in 1988 as a brick building.

=== In the 21st century ===
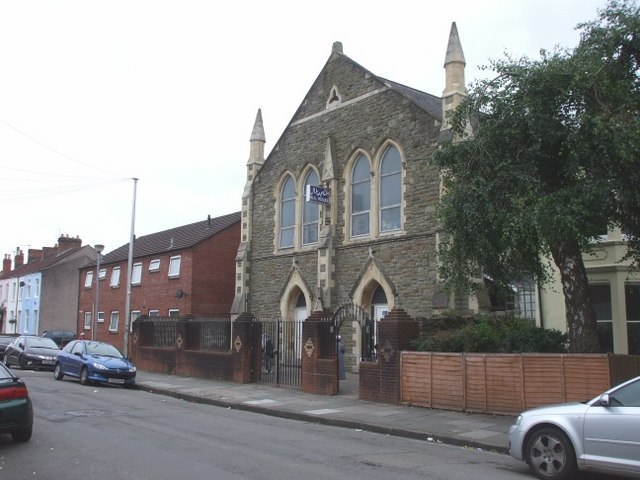
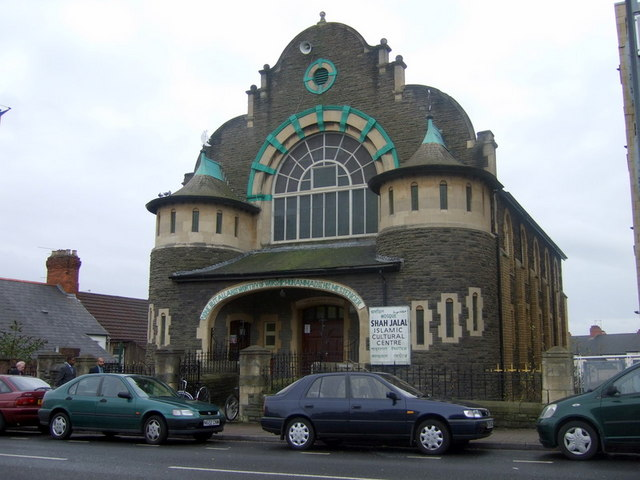
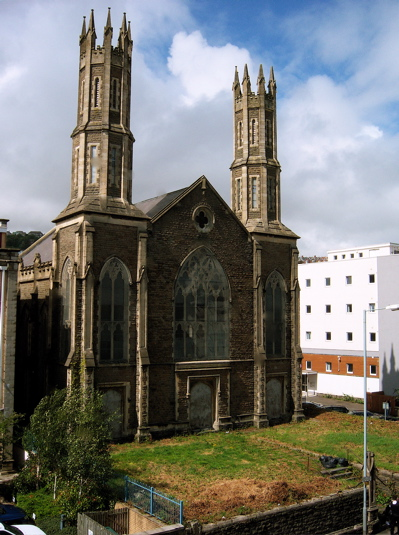
Three Mosques converted from former Welsh dissenter chapels. Bilal Mosque, Cardiff, Shah Jalal Mosque in Cathays, Cardiff and Swansea Mosque.

New Muslim Network Wales was established in the later part of 2001 to provide support and advice to converts to Islam and their non-Muslim family. The group also provides advice to mosques and other Islamic organisations on dawah work and community relations.

In 2003, the Muslim Council of Wales was established with affiliates across Wales to represent the Muslim community in the public sphere.

In 2006, the first scout group for Muslims was launched in Cardiff with over 100 members.

The first university in the UK to be awarded by FOSIS (Federation of Students Islamic Societies, UK & Éire) for the best mosque facility on campus was a Welsh University – Swansea, which received the accolade in 2007.

In 2008, plans were announced to build an Islamic Centre in Carmarthen. A college for training Muslim clerics has been established in Llanybydder in Carmarthenshire.

In the 2010s , the Ahmadiyya Muslim Community has announced plans to construct the first Ahmadi mosque in Wales.

== Demography ==
The 2021 United Kingdom census recorded around 64,000 Welsh Muslims, up around 50% from the 46,000 adherents recorded in the 2011 Census. More than half of all Welsh Muslims (33,650) live in Cardiff.

Newport and Swansea are the second and third largest centers of Islam in Wales after Cardiff, with 11,280 Muslims in Newport and 7,694 in Swansea according to the 2021 Census. As such more than 80% of all Welsh Muslims live in the three largest cities. Outside of these cities, Wrexham is home to the largest Muslim population (1,540), but almost all other areas of Wales are home to a small but increasing Muslim population, with only Ceredigion and Gwynedd reporting a drop in adherents in the 2021 Census.

Of the 57 mosques in Wales, most are to be found in Cardiff, with seven in Newport, and four in Swansea. There are also Mosques in most large towns across the nation such as those at Aberystwyth, Bangor, Barry, Haverfordwest, Lampeter, Neath, Port Talbot and Wrexham.

== Bibliography ==
- Gilliat-Ray, S. and Mellor, J. (2010) ‘Bilad al-Welsh (Land of the Welsh): Muslims in Cardiff, South Wales – past, present, and future’, The Muslim World, 100 (4): 452-475
- Gilliat-Ray, S (2010) ‘The First Registered Mosque in the UK, Cardiff, 1860’: the evolution of a myth. Contemporary Islam, 4 (2): 179-193
- Mellor, J. and Gilliat-Ray, S. (forthcoming) ‘The early history of migration and settlement of Yemenis in Cardiff, 1939 to 1970: Religion and ethnicity as social capital’, Ethnic and Racial Studies.

== See also ==
- Islam in England
- Islam in Scotland
- Islam in Ireland
- Muslim Council of Britain
- Religion in Wales
