= Swansea Mosque =

Mosque in Wales

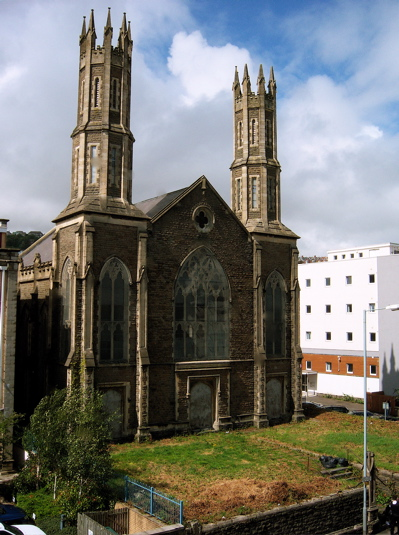
- The former St Andrews United Reformed Church building undergoing redevelopment as the new Swansea Mosque

Religion
- Affiliation: Salafi - Ahl-e-Hadith

Location
- Interactive map of Swansea Mosque
- Coordinates: 51°37′07″N 3°57′10″W

Architecture
- Type: Chapel
- Capacity: 500 people including women

Website
- https://www.swanseamosque.org/

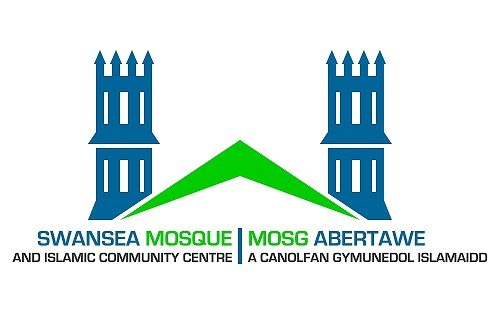
Swansea Mosque and Islamic Community Centre - Mosq Abertawe a Canolfan Gymuneddl Islamaidd

Swansea Mosque is located in two former terraced commercial buildings on St. Helen's Road in Swansea, Wales. It has served the Muslim community in Swansea since the 1980s.

In order to cater for the needs of Swansea's growing Muslim community, a project is underway to redevelop a disused church building nearby on St. Helen's Road just yards away from the existing mosque. The new mosque building was founded in 1862 as St. Andrew's Church. Built in 1864 by Scottish immigrants working in the drapery trade, St. Andrew's was at that time Swansea's only Presbyterian Church.

Designed by John Dickson, the façade has decorative twin towers and is located on St. Helen's Road. St. Andrew's later became the property of the United Reformed Church before falling into dereliction. After fire damage in 1964, the rear hall was redesigned and rebuilt.

A Muslim charity (Kafel Fund UK) bought the building from a private owner in 1997. In 2004 following the merger of the charity with the mosque, the current restoration and renovation plans commenced.

The new mosque project attracted controversy in 2004 when the British National Party circulated a leaflet in opposition to it.

== See also ==
- Islam in Wales
- Islamic schools and branches
