= Shah Jalal Dargah =

Burial place of the 14th-century Muslim saint Shah Jalal in Sylhet, Bangladesh

- শাহজালাল দরগা
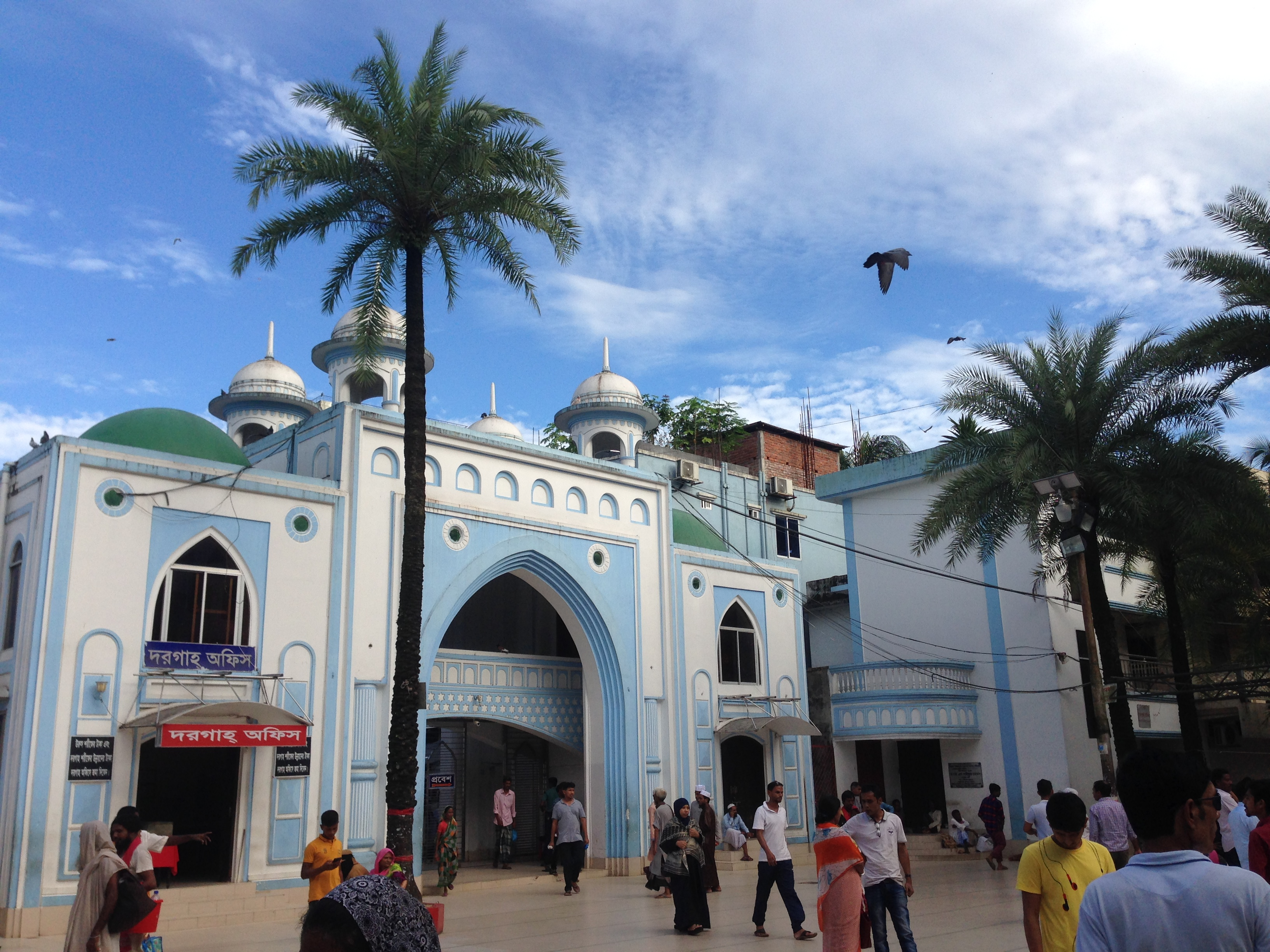
- Dargah gate

- Location of the dargah in Bangladesh

Religion
- Affiliation: Sunni Islam
- Sect: Sufism
- Festival: Urs on 15 March
- Ecclesiastical or organisational status: Dargah
- Leadership: Huzaifa Hussain Chowdhury (Imam); Sareqaum Fatehullah Al-Aman (Mutawalli)
- Status: Active (as a shrine and mosque)

Location
- Location: Dargah Mahalla, Sylhet District, Sylhet Division
- Country: Bangladesh
- Coordinates: 24°54′09″N 91°52′00″E

Architecture
- Type: Mosque architecture
- Style: Mughal
- Completed: c. 1500 CE

The Shah Jalal Dargah (Bengali: শাহজালাল দরগা) is the shrine and burial place of the 14th century Sufi saint Shah Jalal, located in Sylhet, Bangladesh. The site, known as a dargah, was originally constructed c. 1500, though many additions and alterations were made to its structures over the following centuries. It became a religious centre in the region, respected across multiple ruling administrations and greatly venerated among Bengalis, with local folklore and legends developing around it. The extensive surrounding compound serves several functions and includes four mosques, a religious school and a public cemetery among others. The Dargah is presently the largest and most visited religious site in Bangladesh.

== Religious significance ==
Shah Jalal was a Sufi saint traditionally accredited with the Muslim conquest of Sylhet as well as the propagation of Islam in the region. Described by Syed Murtaza Ali as "the patron saint of Sylhet", following his death in 1347, Shah Jalal's burial place in the city became an object of veneration. Both Bengali Muslims and Hindus perform pilgrimages to the site to make offerings and prayers to the saint. (Note: Writer Bipin Chandra Pal reported that Sadhus honoured the site due to a view that Shah Jalal was an incarnation of Mahadev.) The annual urs, a Sufi death anniversary festival, attracts thousands of visitors, mainly from Bangladesh and neighbouring India. The dargah is presently the most visited shrine in Bangladesh, with historian Syed Mahmudul Hasan calling it "the religious centre of Sylhet".

== History ==
It is said that following the conquest, Shah Jalal settled on top of the hillock where the Dargah now sits with some of his companions. The Sultan of Lakhnauti, Shamsuddin Firuz Shah, requested the saint, as a reward, rule over the newly acquired Qasbah of Srihat (Sylhet). However, the latter refused to accept this offer and instead appointed Sikandar Khan Ghazi as the first wazir of the region. Firuz Shah, wanting to somehow reward Shah Jalal, then announced that he would honour the saint by making his residence tax-free. This exemption for the site has continued to the present-day.

The original shrine was constructed by Khalis Khan during the reign of Sultan Alauddin Husain Shah of Bengal according to a 1505 CE inscription at the site, though earlier religious buildings had previously existed there. Among these were a large mosque from the reign of Sultan Shamsuddin Yusuf Shah built by a dastur (minister) named Majlis Alam in 1472, as well as potential buried pre-Islamic ruins, though the latter remains unexcavated. After the region came under Mughal rule, many of the governing Faujdars of Sylhet commissioned construction projects at the site, which included mosques and tombs. Though many have since disappeared, notable among what remains are a three-domed mosque by Bahram Khan, the surrounding wall of the Dargah by Lutfullah Shirazi and the Bara Gumbad mosque by Farhad Khan. (Note: According to an extant Persian inscription, Shirazi also built a small mosque during his term as Faujdar.) It was also under Farhad Khan's tenure that, in 1678, the current shrine was constructed. No presently existing building dates from beyond the 17th century, with subsequent construction tending to only renovate the older structures.

According to old records, when the courtiers of Delhi would visit the town, the Shaykh of the Dargah would ceremonially tie a pagri on their heads. The locals would not accept the high status of the courtiers until they paid their respects to Shah Jalal. This was also a tradition among Sylhet's Muslim rulers who, as an act of reverence, visited the Dargah upon their first arrival at the city. Under the British this custom was continued by the Residents of Sylhet. Robert Lindsay, appointed to that role in 1779, gives the following account of his visit:

I was now told that it was customary for the new resident to pay his respects to the shrine of the tutelar saint, Shaw Juloll. Pilgrims of the Islam faith flock to this shrine from every part of India, and I afterwards found that the fanatics attending the tomb were not a little dangerous. It was not my business to combat religious prejudices, and I therefore went in state, as others had gone before me, left my shoes on the threshold, and deposited on the tomb five gold mohurs as an offering. Being thus purified, I returned to my dwelling, and received the homage of my subjects.

Prince Firuz, a son of the Mughal emperor Shah Alam II, visited the dargah in 1850. The dargah was also visited by the Nizam of Hyderabad's minister.

== Layout and structures ==
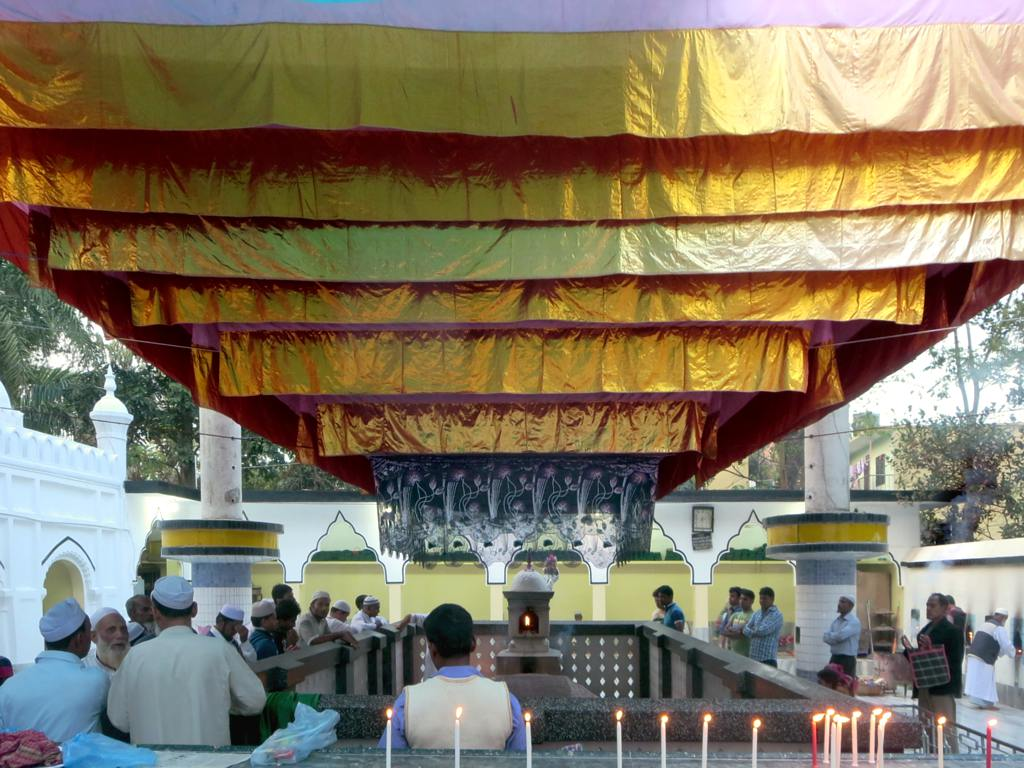
Shah Jalal's open-roofed grave

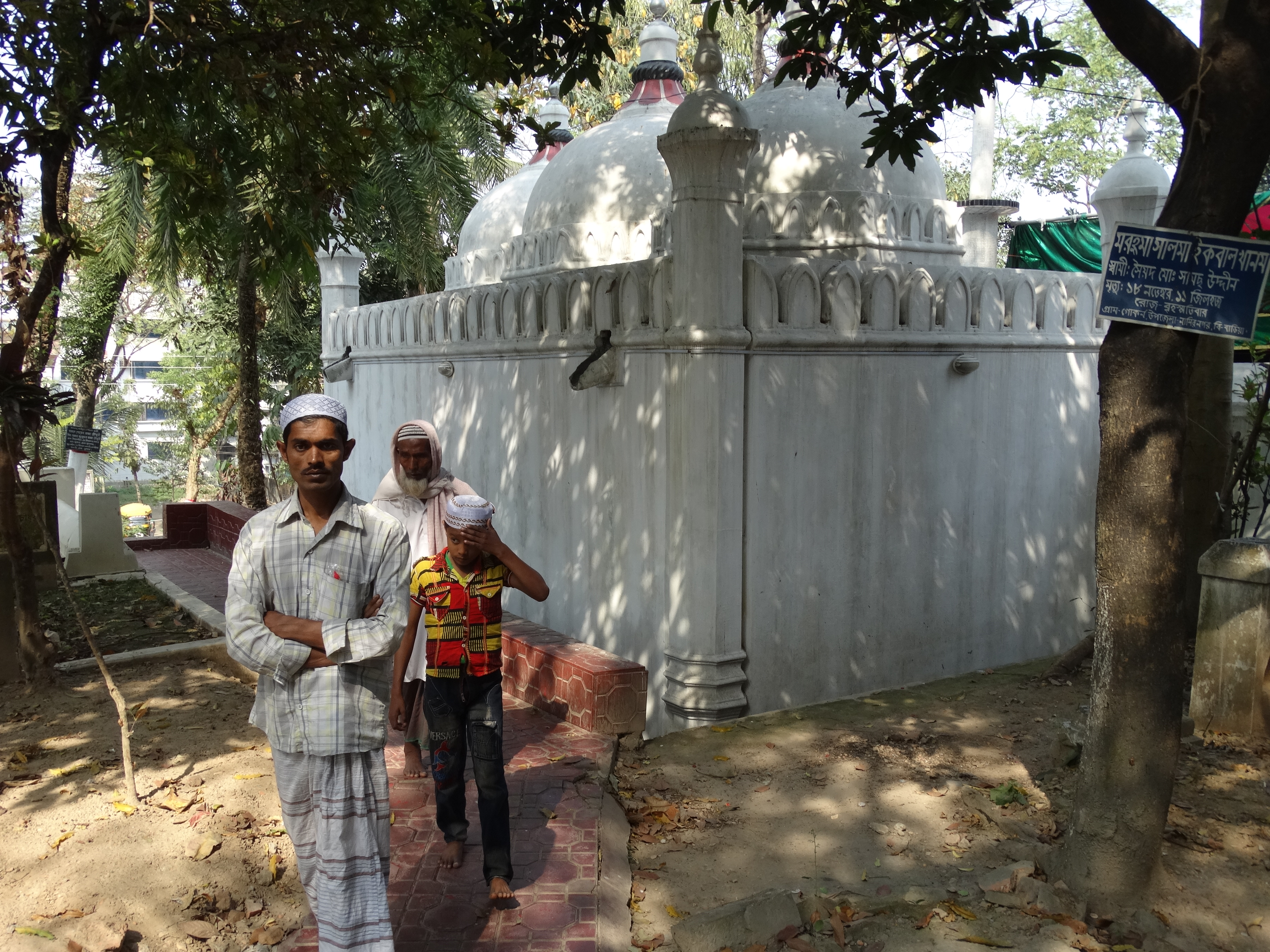
View of shrine from graveyard.

Located on a low hillock (known as the Dargah Tila) in the Dargah Mahalla neighbourhood of north Sylhet, the mausoleum complex is the largest religious compound in Bangladesh. The main entrance, known as the Dargah Gate, opens into a large plaza, ahead of which lies a section dedicated to services for women. Shah Jalal's burial place itself lies in the centre of the compound and is reached via a flight of stairs to the right of this section, though only men are permitted to enter. The steps terminate at a broad flat platform, in front of which is the Bara Gumbad mosque, through which visitors pass to access the tomb. The latter is masonry constructed and open-roofed, with its four corners marked by large tapering pillars which support a cloth canopy, with the grave itself being considered notable for its unusually large size. The burial places of some of Shah Jalal's companions, such as Shahzada Ali, Haji Yusuf, Haji Khalil and Haji Daria, as well as his Chilla Khana, are located nearby. (Note: The descendants of Haji Yusuf subsequently served as Mutawalli (custodians) of the shrine. Thomas William Beale, in his 1881 An Oriental Biographical Dictionary, also mentioned that the Dargah had a large number of attendants to minister it.) The saint's talwars, Quran, robes, wooden kharam, deerskin-prayer rug, copper plates and Arabic-enscribed bowls and cups are also preserved.

As well as containing a madrasa and a khanqah, on the opposite side of the plaza to the tomb is a large Langar Khana (kitchen) to serve the many poor who visit the Dargah and originally made to be a shelter for visitors. This is now closed due to environmental reasons and so there is a small hut built to its east which serves this purpose. Located in the Langar Khana are three brass degs (cauldrons), the largest being 5 feet in height. Each of these cauldrons can simultaneously cook 7 cows and 7 maunds of rice. On their edges are Persian inscriptions that mentions that they were made by Shaykh Abu Sa'id ibn Muhammad Zafar ibn Yar Muhammad of Jahangirnagar and sent by Murad Bakhsh to the Dargah in Ramadan 1106 AH (1694/1695 CE). An extensive graveyard occupies the area behind the tomb, with it being a popular desire among Muslims to be buried near Shah Jalal's remains, though the lots are very expensive. Also present are a Jalsa-house, established during the Mughal period, and an elevated domed clock-tower to its south. To the tomb's west, at the foot of the hillock, is a natural well named Chashma which stands within a spacious brick enclosure. According to legend, Shah Jalal himself ordered its digging, and its sacred water, which is drunk by visiting pilgrims, is the same as that of the Zamzam Well in Mecca.

Legends also exist regarding the catfish and great snakeheads (known as gozar) that inhabit the shrine's tank reservoir, which are commonly fed by visitors. They are said to be the defeated soldiers of Gour Govinda, cursed by Shah Jalal to be eternally reborn in this form. Alternatively, they have also been claimed to be descendants of fish which had been bred by the saint. In December 2003, an unidentified group poisoned and killed over 700 of the fish. In response, the following month, 24 gozar were brought from the shrine of Shah Jalal's companion, Shah Mustafa, in the neighbouring Moulvibazar District and released into the Dargah reservoir. Presently, the population has once more risen to the hundreds. Local folklore further states that the Blue Rock Pigeons seen in and around the Dargah (known as Jalali Kabutar or 'Jalal's pigeons') are descended from a pair gifted to the saint by Nizamuddin Auliya.

=== Mosques ===
A total of four mosques currently exist around the dargah, with the Bara Gumbad being the biggest of these as well as the largest structure in the compound in general. Constructed in 1677 by Farhad Khan, its original purpose is uncertain, though historian Ahmad Hasan Dani suggested that it may have been intended as a tomb. Its single dome rests on an octagonal drum and is topped with a pinnacle and surrounded by corner towers, also octagonal, though the latter are stunted due to their tops having disappeared. The structure has three framed entrances on its eastern side, with the middle being the largest, and a small niche between them. The parapet is of a blended Mughal and Bengali style and the interior is simple, though the underside of the dome is decorated.

To the south of the Bara Gumbad is Bahram Khan's three-domed structure, commissioned in 1744, which serves as the primary mosque of the compound. Each of its domes has tall finials and rest on crenelated drums. Like the Bara Gumbad, its eastern side has three arched doors, the middle also larger, as well as a modern veranda. The mosque was damaged during the 1897 Assam earthquake, requiring repairs by the Magistrate of Sylhet, John Willes. A smaller mosque stands on the western side of Shah Jalal's grave and forms a part of the enclosure. Three-domed and likely originally also constructed by Farhad Khan, it was rebuilt in the same design and style in the late-18th century by the then Collector of Sylhet. A fourth mosque, erected by Abdullah Shirazi, lies on the eastern bank of the tank reservoir.

== Notable burials ==
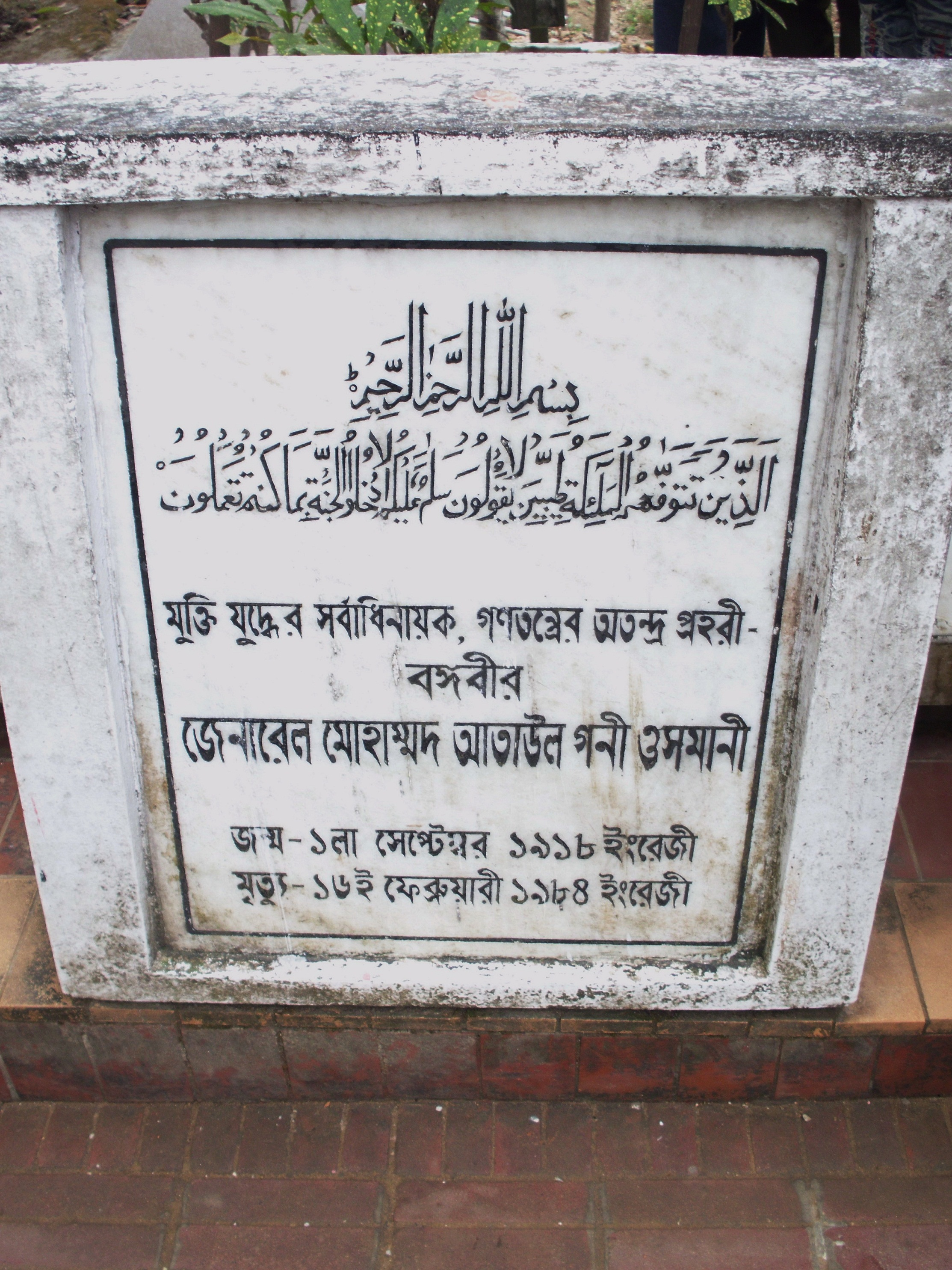
The grave of M.A.G. Osmani, located in the Dargah cemetery.

- Shah Jalal: Sufi saint (1271–1347)
- Haji Muhammad Yusuf: companion of Shah Jalal (c. 14th century)
- Muqabil Khan: Wazir of Sylhet (c. 1440s)
- Sadeq Khan: Faujdar of Sylhet (d. 1688)
- M. A. G. Osmani: Commander-in-chief of the Mukti Bahini (1918–1984)
- Salman Shah: film and television actor (1971–1996)
- Humayun Rashid Choudhury: Speaker of the Jatiya Sangsad (1928–2001)
- Asaddor Ali: writer and historian (1929–2005)
- Arif Billah Akbar Ali: Deobandi Islamic scholar (1916–2005)
- E. A. Chowdhury: Inspector General of Police (1928–2009)
- Dewan Farid Gazi: Member of Parliament (1924–2010)
- Enamul Haque Chowdhury: Member of Parliament (1948–2011)
- Muhammad Ashraf Ali: Member of Parliament (d. 2015)
- Gulzar Ahmed Chowdhury: Member of Parliament (1937–2019)
- Abul Kalam Zakaria: Deobandi Islamic scholar (1956–2019)
- Mahmudul Amin Choudhury: Chief Justice of the Supreme Court (1937–2019)
- Fazlul Haque Aspia: Member of Parliament (1935/6–2021)
- Muhibbul Haque Gachbari: Deobandi Islamic scholar (1945–2023)
- Imam Uddin Ahmed Chowdhury: advisor to caretaker government (1926–2023)
- C. B. Zaman: filmmaker and actor (1945–2024)

== Gallery ==
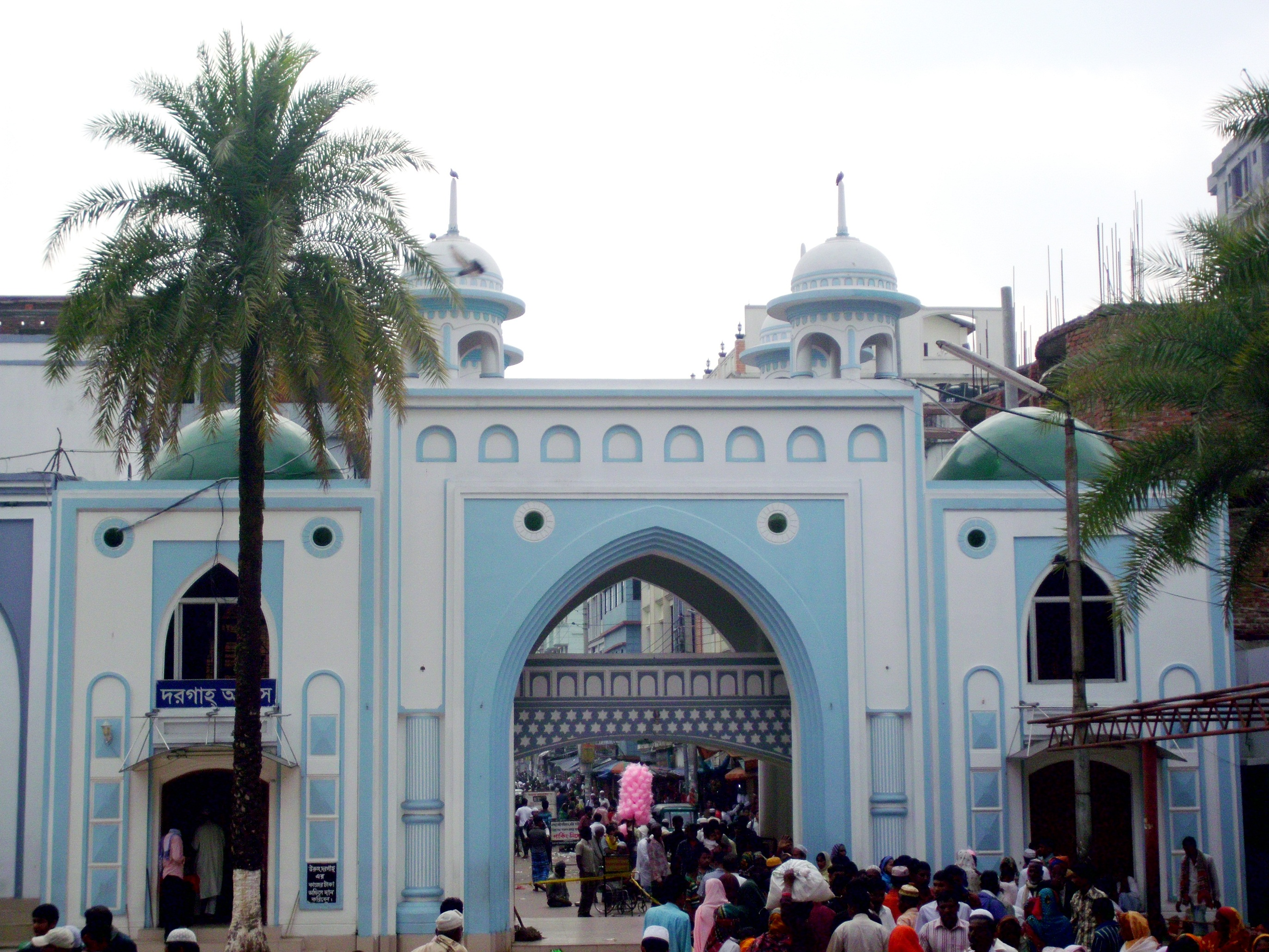
Dargah Gate

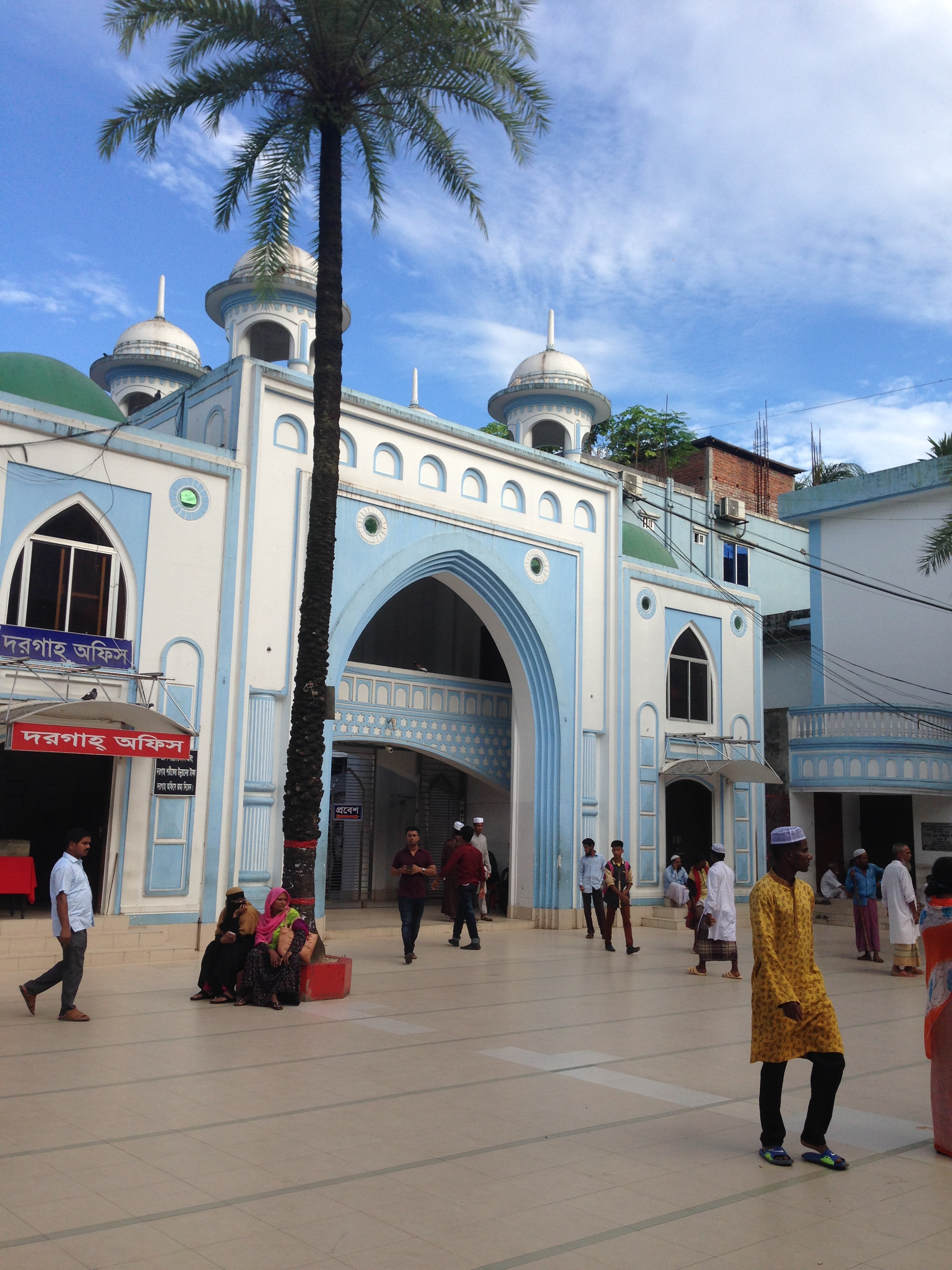
Another view of the dargah gate

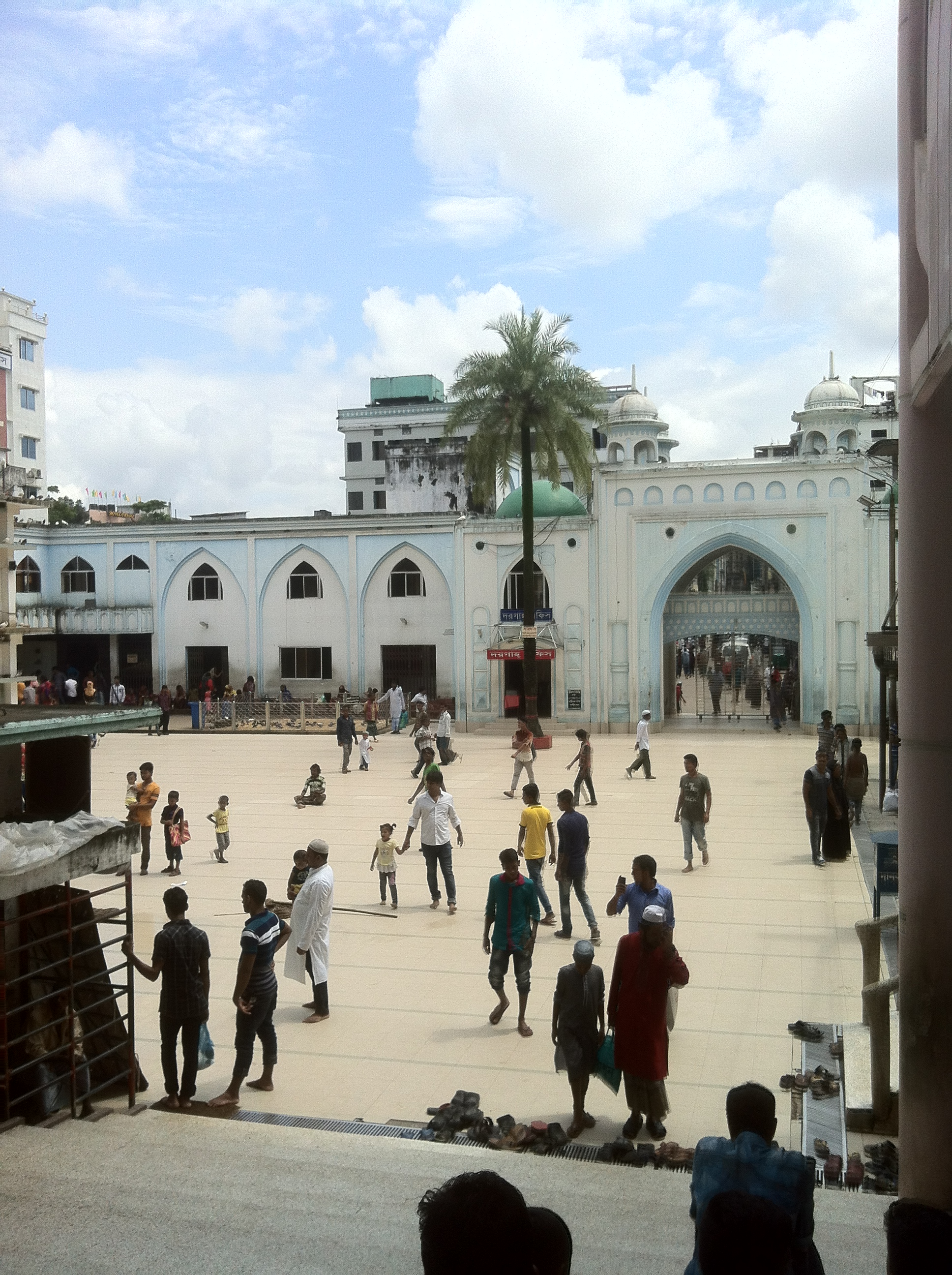
Main plaza with the dargah gate in the background

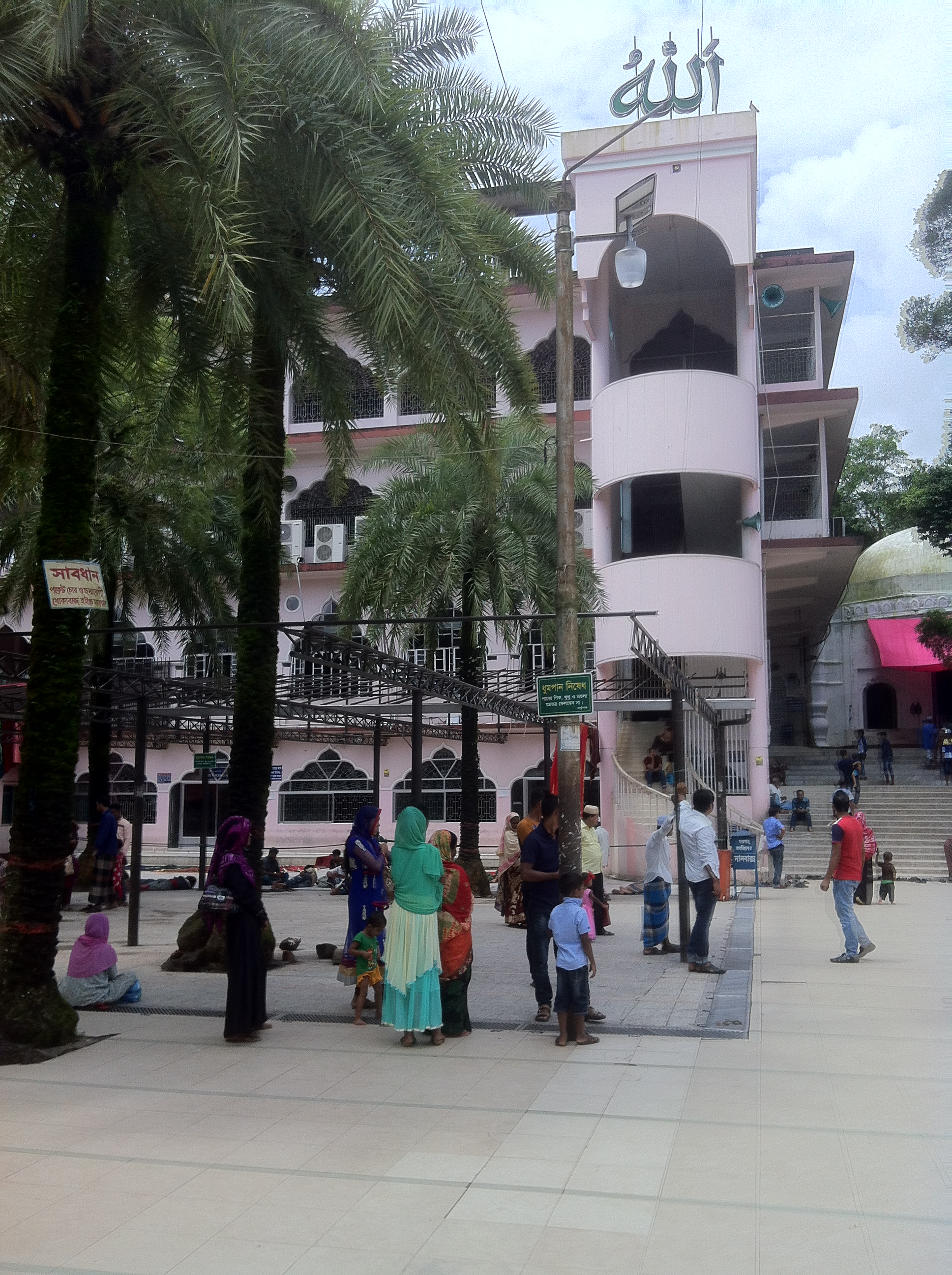
The eastern side of the dargah's primary mosque with its modern veranda. On the right are the steps leading to the Bara Gumbad

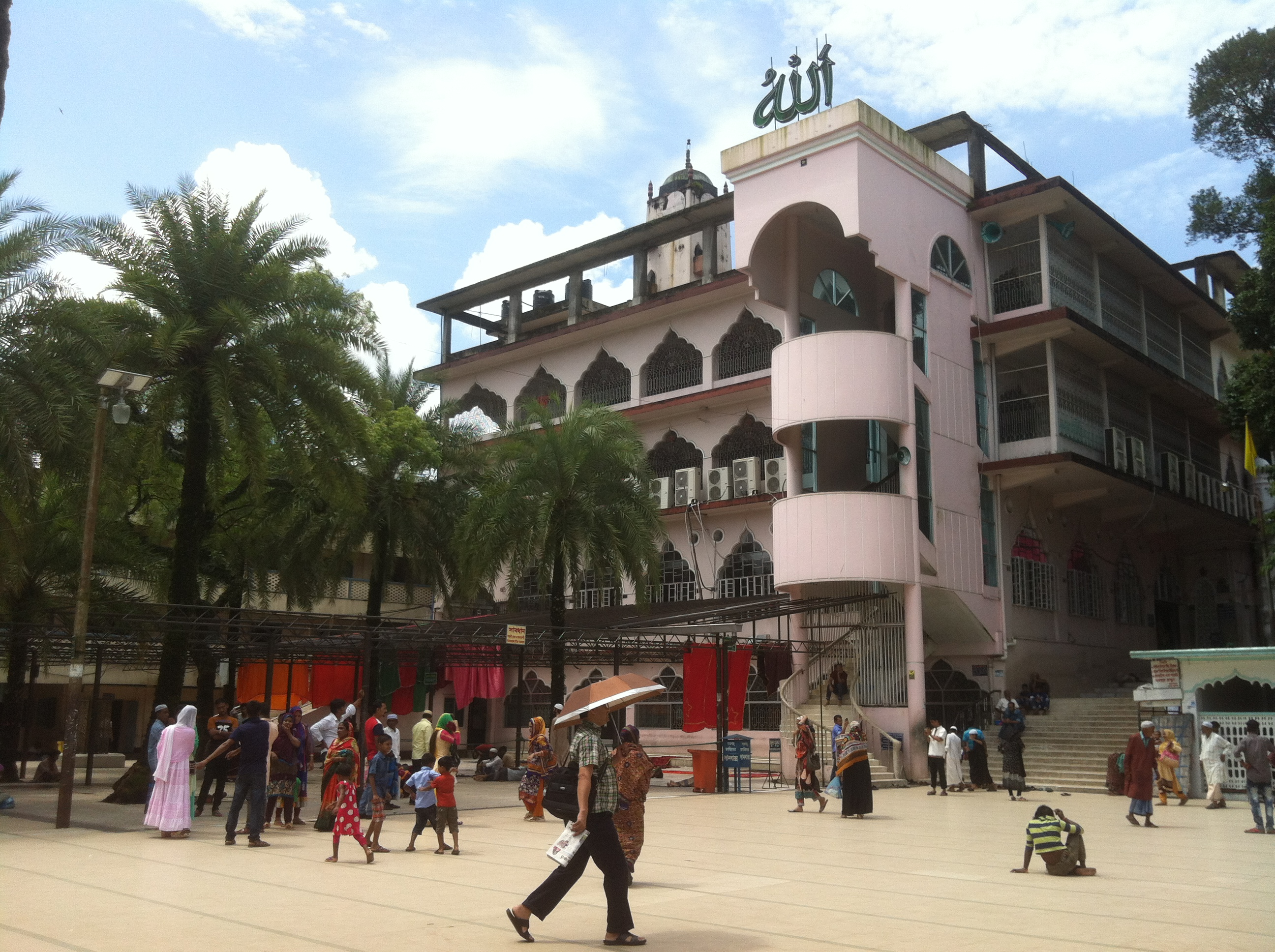
Another view of the mosque

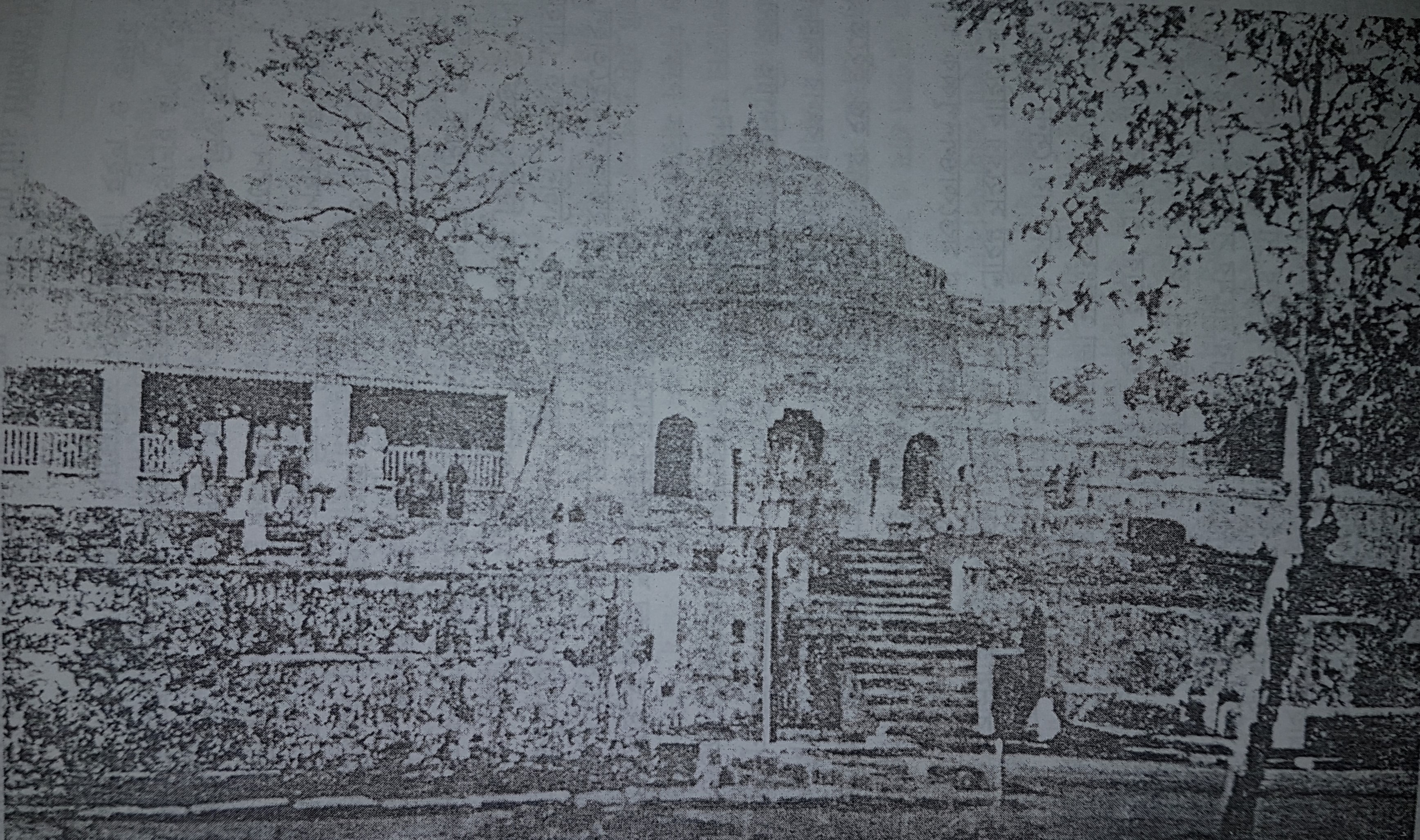
The mosque (prior to the construction of its veranda) and the Bara Gumbad, c. 1900s

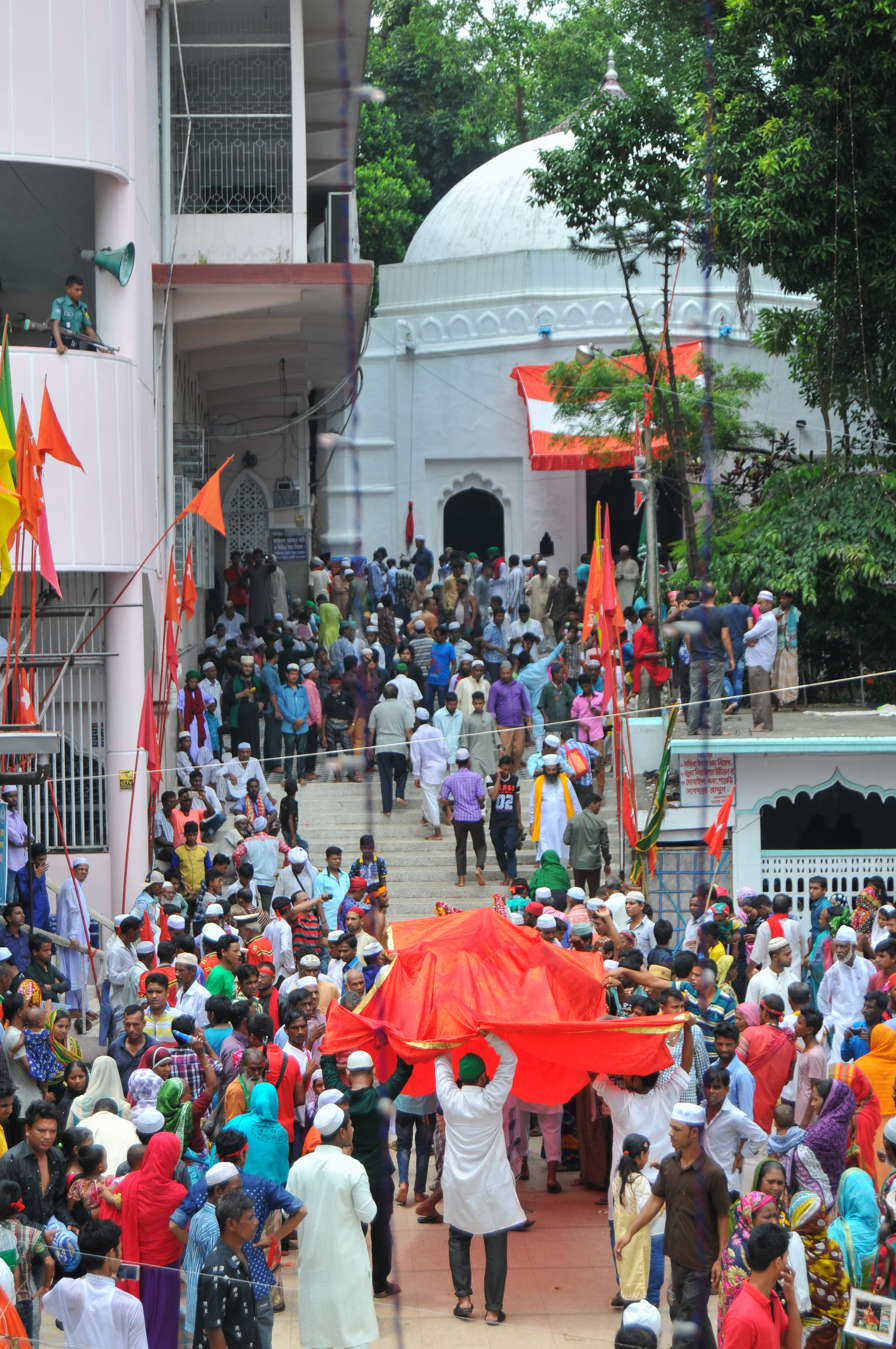
The steps to the Bara Gumbad, with a partial view of the women's section on the right

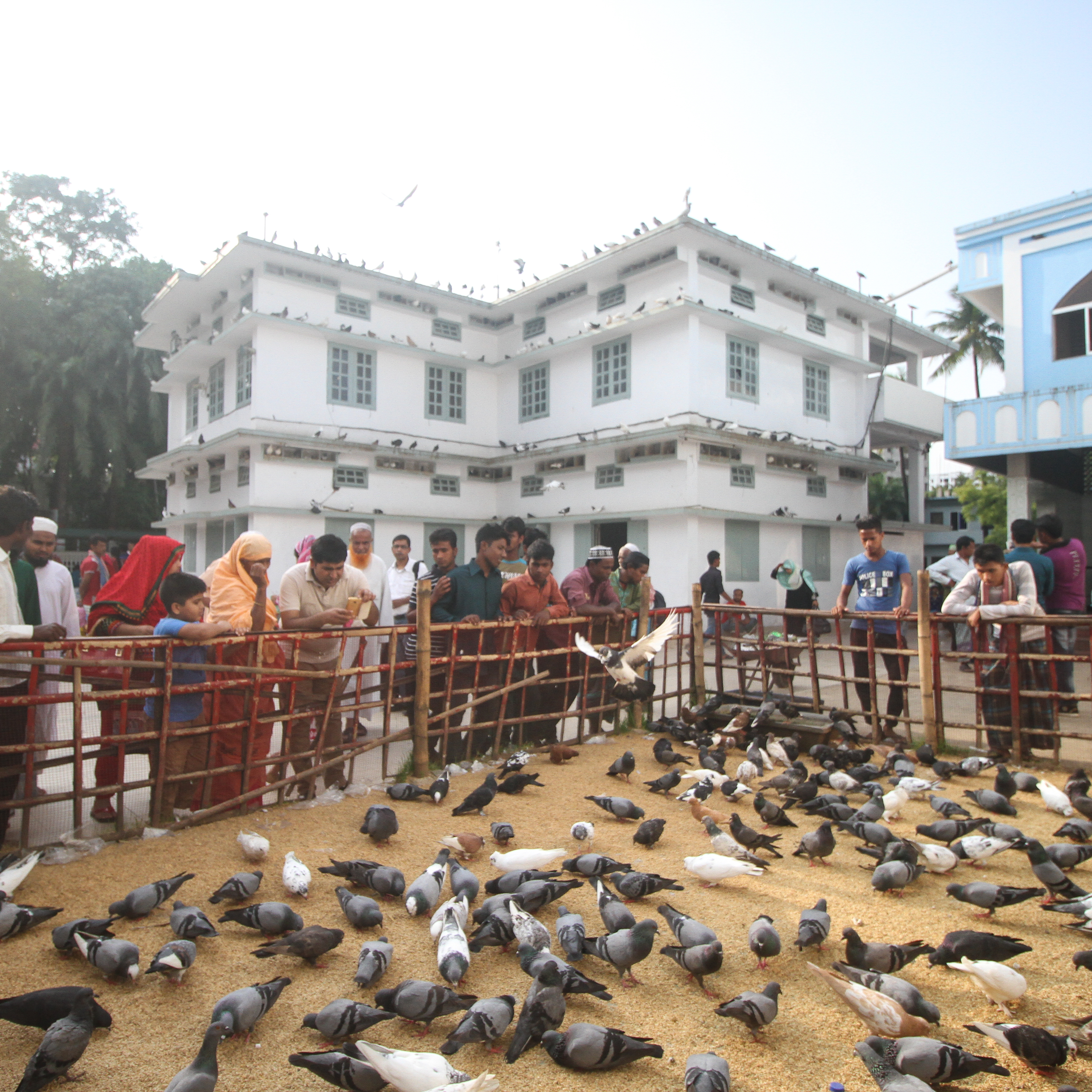
Jalali Kabutar

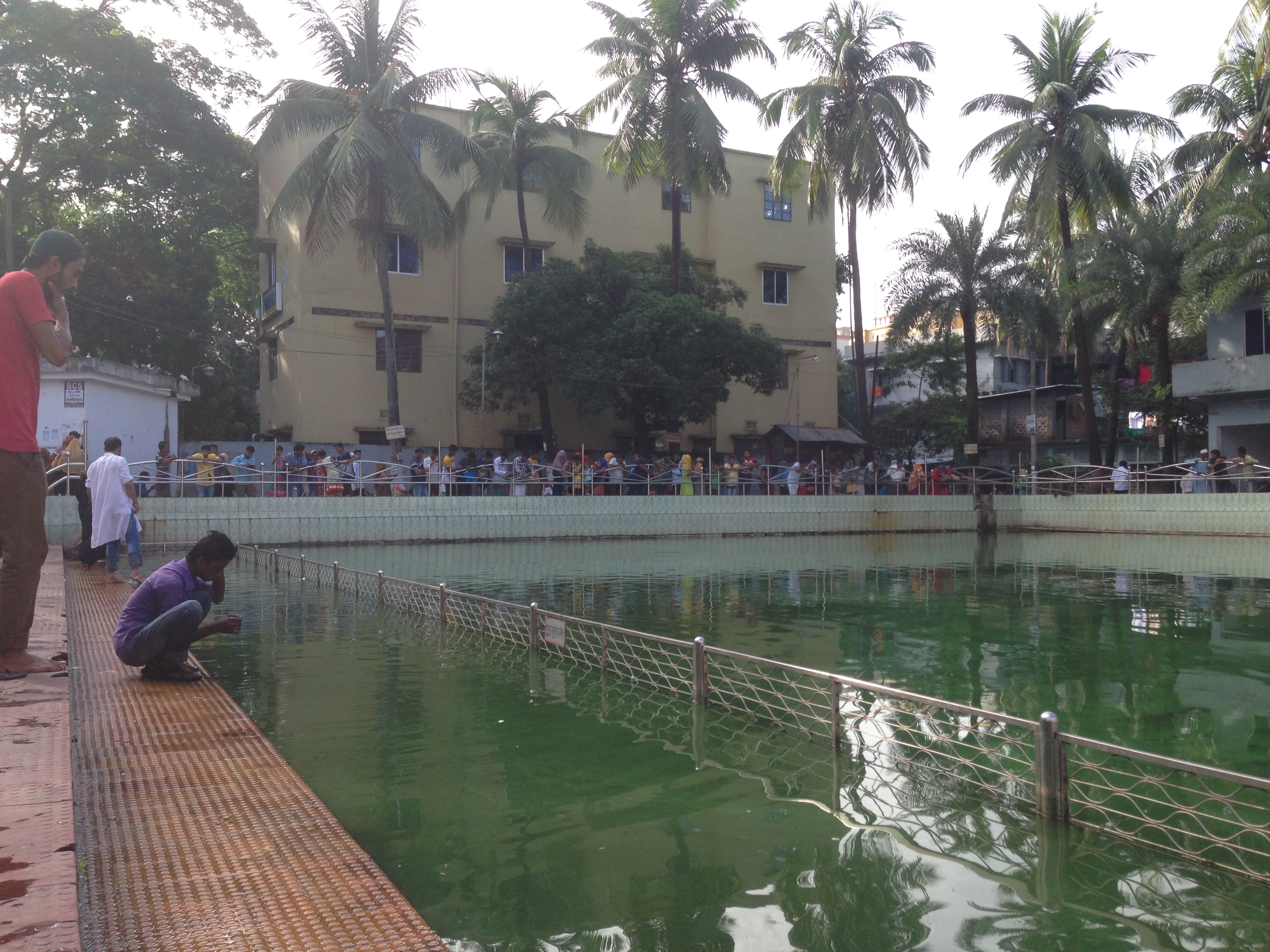
Tank reservoir

== See also ==
- Islam in Bangladesh
- List of mosques in Bangladesh
