= Imam Uddin Ahmed Chowdhury =

Bangladeshi politician (1926–2023)

- ইমাম উদ্দীন আহমেদ চৌধুরী

Minister of Commerce
- In office 6 December 1990 – 20 March 1991
- Leader: Shahabuddin Ahmed
- Succeeded by: M. K. Anwar

Minister of Housing and Public Works
- In office 31 August 1985 – 6 January 1987
- Preceded by: Abdul Mannan Siddique
- Succeeded by: Sheikh Shahidul Islam

Personal details
- Born: Imam Uddin Ahmed Chowdhury Koychar; December 10, 1926 Daudpur, Sylhet, Assam Province, British Raj
- Died: October 24, 2023 (aged 96) Sylhet, Bangladesh
- Resting place: Shah Jalal Dargah, Sylhet, Bangladesh
- Spouse: Suraiyah Chowdhury
- Relations: Shafi Ahmed Chowdhury (brother); E. A. Chowdhury (brother)
- Children: 1 son & 1 daughter
- Parent(s): Gauch Uddin Ahmad Chowdhury (father); Sara Khatun Chowdhury (mother)
- Education: University of Calcutta; Bangladesh University of Engineering and Technology

Imam Uddin Ahmed Chowdhury (Bengali: ইমাম উদ্দীন আহমেদ চৌধুরী; 10 December 1926 – 24 October 2023) was a Bangladeshi career bureaucrat and adviser, with the rank of minister, of Shahabuddin Ahmed's caretaker government. He died on 24 October 2023, at the age of 96, and was buried at the Shah Jalal Dargah in Sylhet.

== Career ==
Ahmed was an adviser in the Shahabuddin Ahmed caretaker government. He was in charge of the Ministry of Commerce.
