= Shah Paran =

14th-century Sufi figure

- শাহ পরাণ
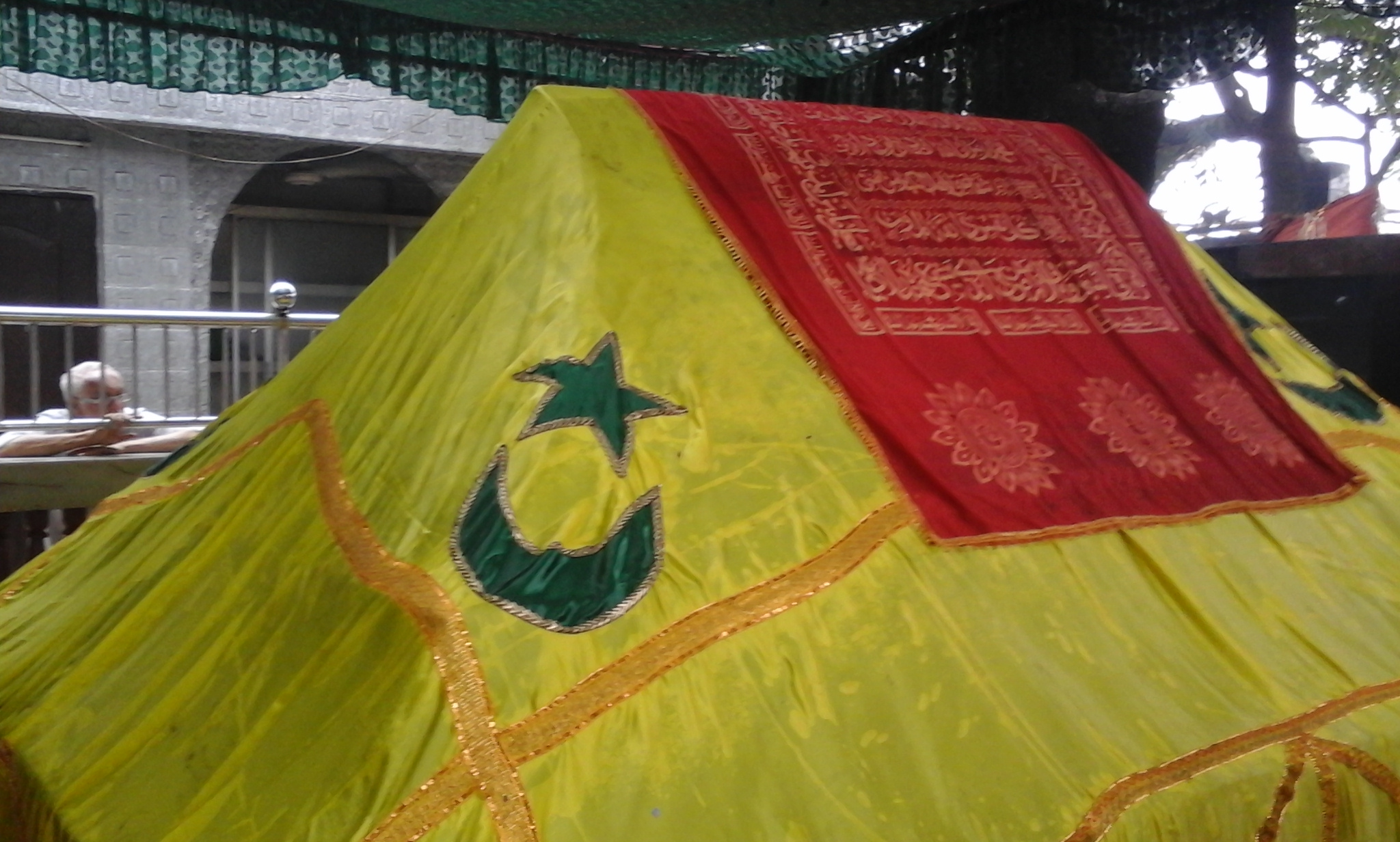
- Tomb of Shah Paran

Personal life
- Born: Konya, Sultanate of Rum, (now in Turkey) or Hadhramaut, Yemen (disputed)
- Died: Sylhet, Bangladesh
- Parent: Mohammad (father)

Religious life
- Religion: Islam
- Denomination: Sufism

Muslim leader
- Based in: Sylhet
- Post: Scholar and Sufi mystic
- Period in office: 13th century to early 14th century
- Predecessor: Shah Jalal

Plaza in front of Shah Paran's dargah

Shah Paran (Bengali: শাহ পরাণ, romanized: Shah Poran) was a 14th-century Sufi saint of the Sylhet region. In 1303, he took part in the final battle of the Conquest of Sylhet led by his maternal uncle Shah Jalal.

== Biography ==
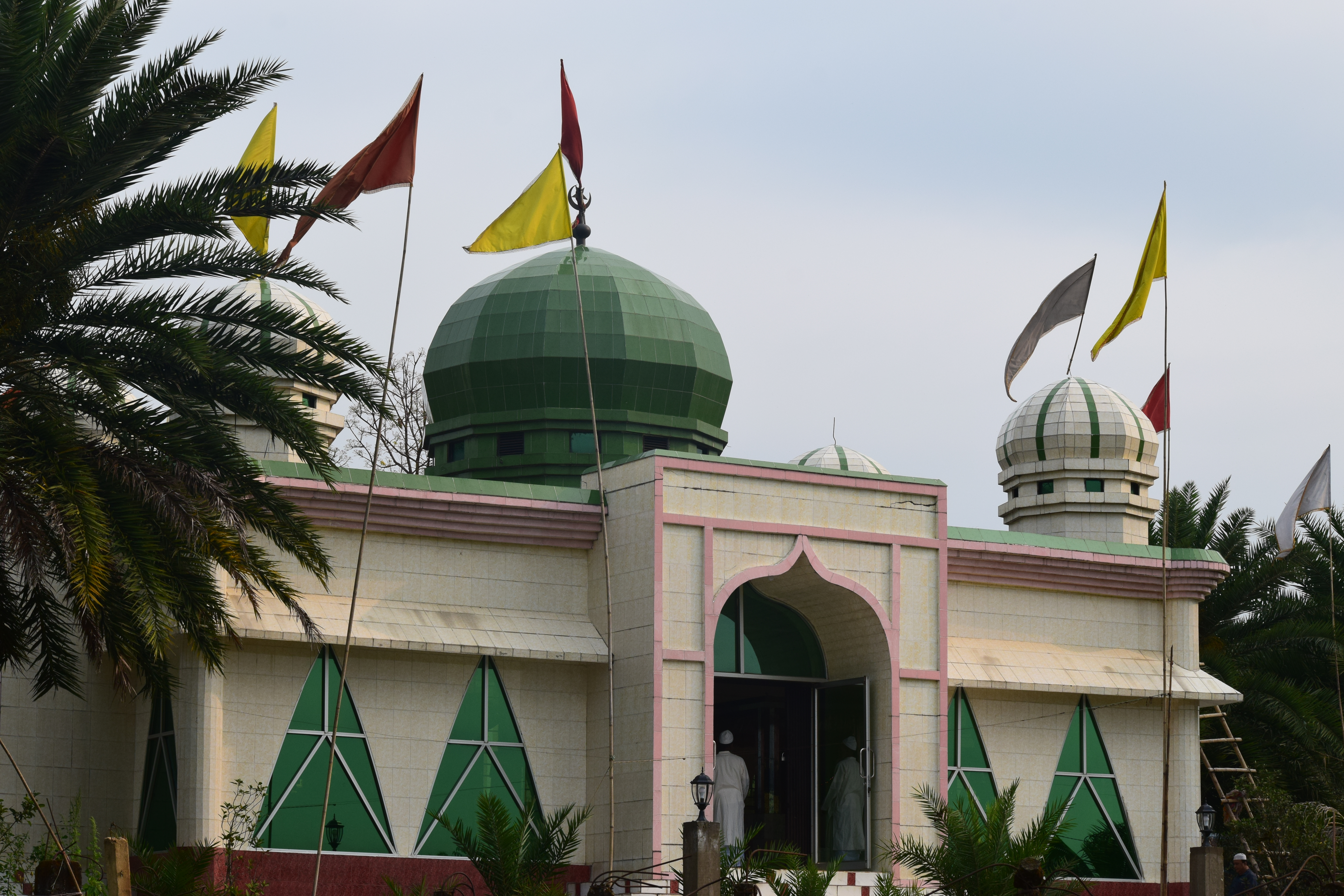
A mosque built next to the dargah of Shah Paran

Shah Paran's birth name is unknown though it has been suggested that his name was Farhan which later got corrupted into Poran, meaning "soul". Poran is used as a term of endearment in the Bengali language. Others suggest that Shah Paran was a corruption of Shah Piran meaning "king of pirs".

His father's name was Muhammad who died when Paran was 11 years old. Paran studied under his grandfather Syed Ahmad Kabir Suhrawardi and later with Amin, a dervish from Neshapur. He decided to accompany Shah Jalal, his maternal uncle, in his expedition across the Indian subcontinent to propagate the religion of Islam. In 1303, Paran took part in the final battle of the Conquest of Sylhet under Shah Jalal's leadership against Raja Gour Govinda.

Some time after, Paran was said to have consumed one of the Jalali Kobutor, the pigeons that Jalal received as a gift from Nizamuddin Auliya in Delhi. As a result, Paran was banished outside of Sylhet town. He established a khanqah on top of a hill in modern-day Khadim Nagar, Dakshingarh which came to be known as Shah Paran's hill.

== Death and legacy ==
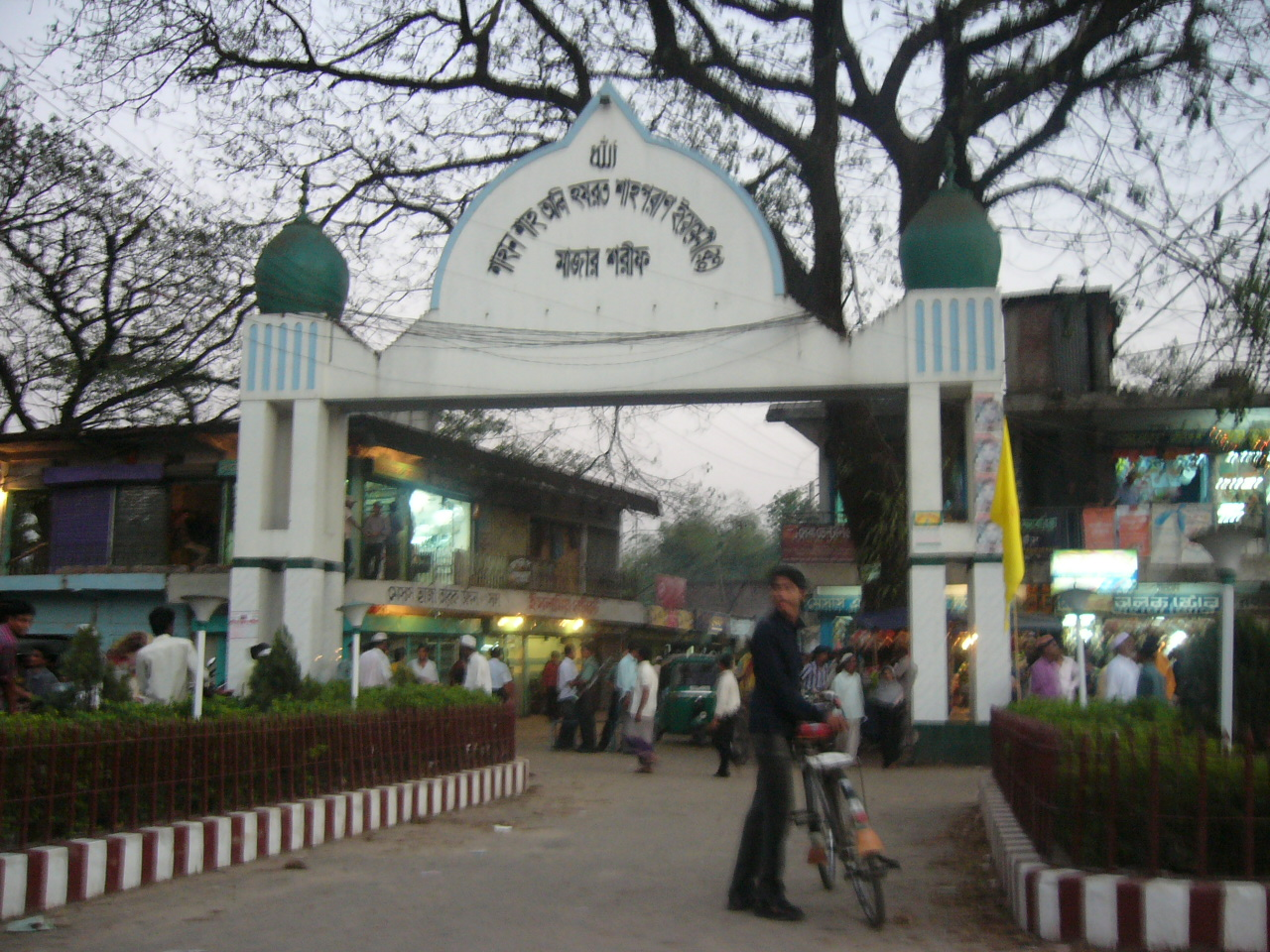
Entrance gate to Shah Paran's shrine

Paran died unmarried and with no descendants. He was buried near his khanqah. A dargah complex was built with a neighbouring mosque, eidgah, langar khana, female prayer space and pond. For centuries, large numbers of devotees have visited his tomb, a practice which continues to the present time. On the 4th, 5th and 6th day of Rabi-ul-Awal, the Urs of Shah Paran takes place.

A bridge over the Surma River, a passenger ferry, and a residence hall at Shahjalal University of Science and Technology have all been named after Shah Paran.

== Spiritual genealogy ==
Spiritual genealogy of Shah Paran is as follows:

- Imam Ali Al Hadi (10th shia imam and a grand scholar according to Suhrwardiy tradition)
- Syed Jaffar Al Zaki
- Syed Ali Al Askar Al Nazuk
- Syed Abdullah Al Nazuk
- Syed Ahmed Al Nazuk (migrated to Mashhad from Samarrah Iraq
- Syed Mehmood Bukhari (migrated to Bukhara
- Syed Muhammad Abu Al Fateh
- Syed Jaffar Ameer
- Syed Ali Al Moeed
- Jalaluddin Surkh-Posh Bukhari
- Syed Ahmad Kabir Suhrawardi Hussaini Jalali
- Shah Jalal

== See also ==
- List of Sufis
- Islam in Bangladesh
