= Kaninah =

Coordinates: 14°30′N 48°21′E

- Interactive map of Kaninah
- Country: Yemen
- Governorate: Hadhramaut Governorate
- Time zone: UTC+3 (Yemen Standard Time)

Kaninah is a village in eastern Yemen. It is located in the Hadhramaut Governorate.
