= Shah Jalal Mosque, Cardiff =

Mosque in Cardiff, Wales, United Kingdom

Shah Jalal Mosque
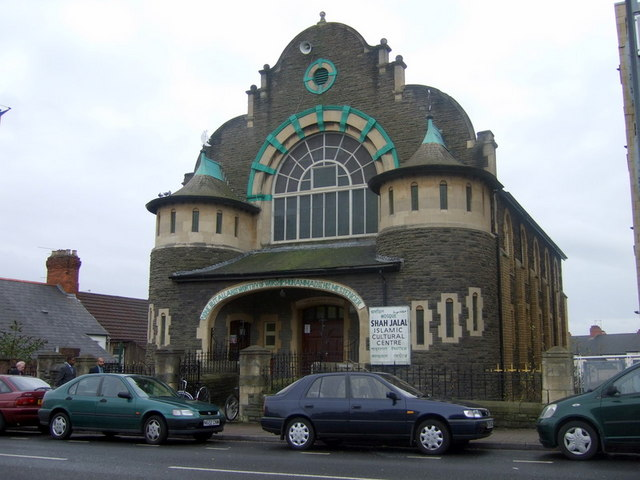

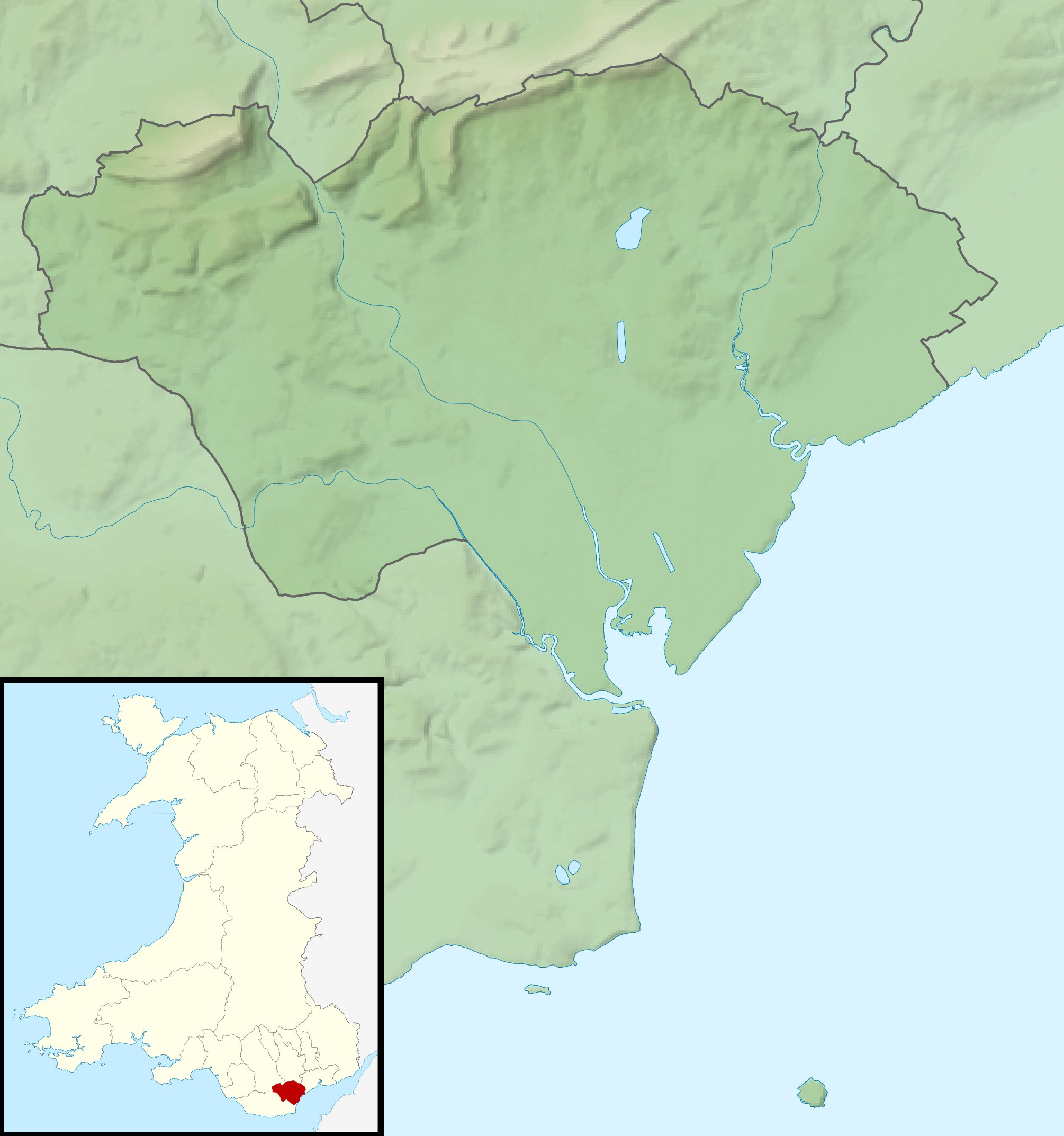
- Location within Cardiff

Religion
- Affiliation: Islam

Location
- Interactive map of Shah Jalal Mosque
- Coordinates: 51.4931°N 3.1736°W

Architecture
- Architect: J. H. Phillips
- Completed: 1899
- Capacity: 600 worshipers

The Shah Jalal Mosque, officially the Shah Jalal Mosque & Islamic Cultural Centre is a listed place of worship in Cardiff, Wales. Originally built for Methodist Christians, it ceased as a church in the 1980s and is now a mosque. It is affiliated to Bangladeshi Sufi Fultoli movement.

== History ==
A Welsh Calvinistic Methodist presence in Cathays began in 1884, with the founding of Capel Horeb, a small building on May Street. It owed its birth to the widening of Cardiff's boundaries in 1875, which had taken in more Welsh-language speakers in the areas around the city. In 1900, this building was closed and the congregation moved to a newer, more prominent location on nearby Crwys Road. The building is constructed in Pennant stone and Bath stone with dressings in yellow brick, and on completion, was named Capel Heol y Crwys. The May Street building is now used by the Salvation Army. In its early years, it was a very popular Welsh-speaking chapel, with regular congregations of 500, but as with many of Cardiff's suburban churches, its attendance declined in the late 20th century, and maintenance costs became hard to meet. In 1988, the congregation moved into newer premises in Richmond Road, having acquired a building formerly used by Christian Scientists. It continues to operate at the location. In 1990, the old chapel underwent conversion into a mosque.

The mosque became Grade II Listed on 21 August 1997.

== See also ==
- Islam in Wales
