= Shahjalal Uposhahar =

Coordinates: 24.8885°N 91.8876°E

Shahjalal Upashahor, Sylhet শাহজালাল উপশহর, সিলেট
- Nickname: Upashahor
- Interactive map of Shahjalal Upashahor, Sylhet
- Bangladesh: Bangladesh
- Division: Sylhet
- District: Sylhet
- City: Sylhet
- Ward: 22

Shahjalal Upashahor, Sylhet is a neighborhood in Sylhet, Bangladesh. It is part of Ward 22 of Sylhet City Corporation.
