= Conquest of Sylhet =

Muslim conquest of the Gour Kingdom

- Part of the Muslim conquests in the Indian subcontinent
Date	1303 CE
Location	Govinda's Fort and the banks of the Surma River
Result	Lakhnauti Sultanate victory: Fall of the Gour Kingdom; Rise of Islam in Greater Sylhet
Territorial changes	Parts of Greater Sylhet annexed by the Lakhnauti Sultanate

Belligerents
Lakhnauti Sultanate	Gour Kingdom; Tungachal

Commanders and leaders
Sultan Shamsuddin Firoz Shah; Syed Nasiruddin; Sikandar Khan Ghazi; Shah Jalal; Ghazi Burhanuddin	Raja Gour Govinda (surrendered); Mona Rai †; Raja Achak Narayan; Prince Nirvana; Prince Garuda †

Strength
<10,000	100,000+ infantry, thousands of cavalry

The conquest of Sylhet predominantly refers to a Muslim conquest of the Gour Kingdom in Srihatta (present-day Sylhet, Bangladesh) led by Sikandar Khan Ghazi, the military general of Sultan Shamsuddin Firoz Shah of the Lakhnauti Sultanate, against the Hindu king Gour Govinda. The conquest was aided by a Muslim saint known as Shah Jalal, who later ordered his disciples to scatter throughout eastern Bengal and propagate Islam. The conquest may also include other minor incidents taking place after Govinda's defeat, such as the capture of nearby Taraf.

== Background ==
Before the conquest, the Greater Sylhet region historically consisted of many Hindu petty kingdoms such as Srihatta (Gour), Laur and Jaintia. Gour Govinda was a Hindu ruler of the Gour Kingdom, who, some claim, was intolerant and harsh towards other faiths such as Islam, Buddhism and even certain denominations of Hinduism. It was known by his people that Govinda practiced magic which he had learnt in the mountains of Kamaru and was religiously and militarily educated for twelve years in the Kamakhya Temple, and Kulsia Ashram (on the banks of the Kulsi River in modern-day Sualkuchi or Kulsi Reserve Forest) respectively. During his reign, he built forts all over his kingdom and established many military training camps. He is famously known to have built a seven-storey brick tower.

The Gour Kingdom bordered the independent Bengali principality of Lakhnauti ruled by the Muslim Sultan Shamsuddin Firoz Shah of the Balban dynasty. There was a small minority of Muslim families living in the region, following the short-lived Azmardan invasion in 1254 led by the Delhite governor of Bengal, Malik Ikhtiyaruddin Iuzbak.

=== Incitement ===
The conquest was incited when Burhanuddin, a Muslim living in the village of Tultikar, sacrificed a cow for his newborn son's aqiqah or celebration of birth. The beef was supposedly picked up by a crow, which then flew to Govinda's Hindu temple and dropped it there. Govinda, in a fury for what he saw as sacrilege due to his Hindu beliefs, had the newborn killed as well as having Burhanuddin's right hand cut off. Shortly after this incident, Qadi Nuruddin of Taraf celebrated his son's marriage ceremony by slaughtering a cow for them to eat. The Qadi was executed by the feudal ruler Achack Narayan. After both men being punished, Burhanuddin and Nooruddin's brother, Helimuddin, travelled to lower Bengal where they addressed their issued with Sultan Shamsuddin Firoz Shah.

== Early attempts ==
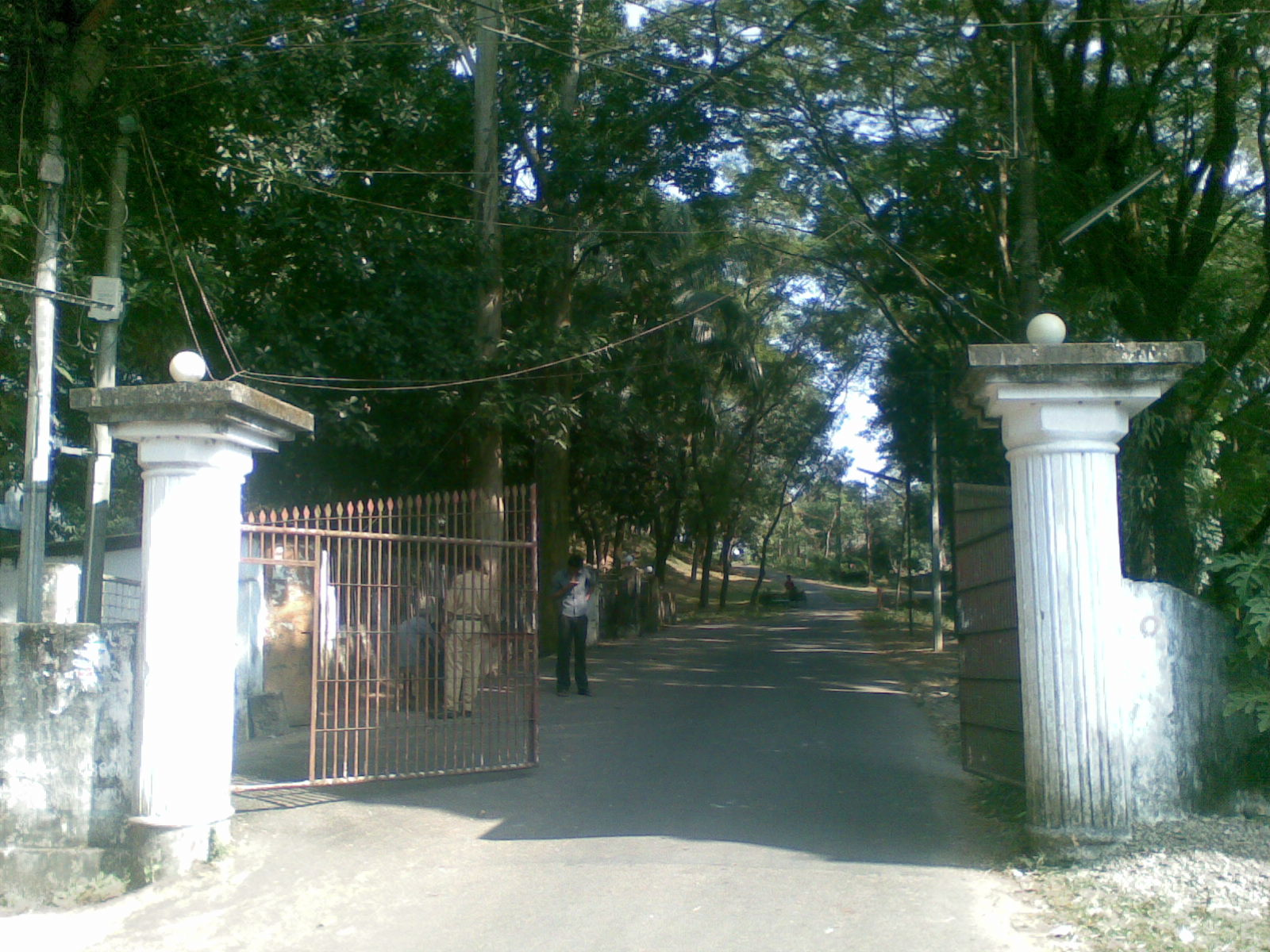
Gour Govinda's Tila (Hill) which contains his fort.

As Govinda's minister, Mona Rai, was based near the port, Rai decided to stop river transport and ferries making it difficult for the opponents as the only other option was through the hills. When word of this reached Sultan Firoz Shah, the commanded his nephew Sikandar Khan Ghazi to lead an army against the Raja. Ghazi marched with his soldiers towards the low-lying hills of Sylhet via Mymensingh.

Govinda appointed Chakrapani as his commander-in-chief. The army was confronted by Govinda's skilful archery. Govinda's army was noted as Bengal's first army which practised the skillful art of archery. The Muslim army, inexperienced in the foreign terrain which consisted of many low-lying hills and valleys, were brought to utter shame by Govinda's archers and had no option but to retreat back to avoid casualties.

The Sultan was not happy at all with the result of the first battle and decided that the army should train and prepare before readying themselves for another battle. In the second expedition, Ghazi took the same recognised route through Mymensingh. As the army marched through the hills, a storm took place. Due to heavy rainfall and flooding, nearly half of the army died by the time Ghazi reached Srihatta. They were defeated once again and Ghazi retreated back to Bengal for a second time, humiliated by what had occurred.

Firoz Shah then turned to his sipah salar (commander-in-chief) Syed Nasiruddin as he realised that this undertaking was much bigger than he anticipated and he would need a larger and more skilled army. The two armies decided to attack together but it ended in failure due to Govinda's superior military strategy. Govinda's family rejoiced over the three consecutive victories and his aunt Apurna, the queen-mother and wife of the previous Raja Govardhan, celebrated by building a large 20-acre water tank in Ambarkhana known as Rajar Mar Dighi.

== Shah Jalal's conquest ==
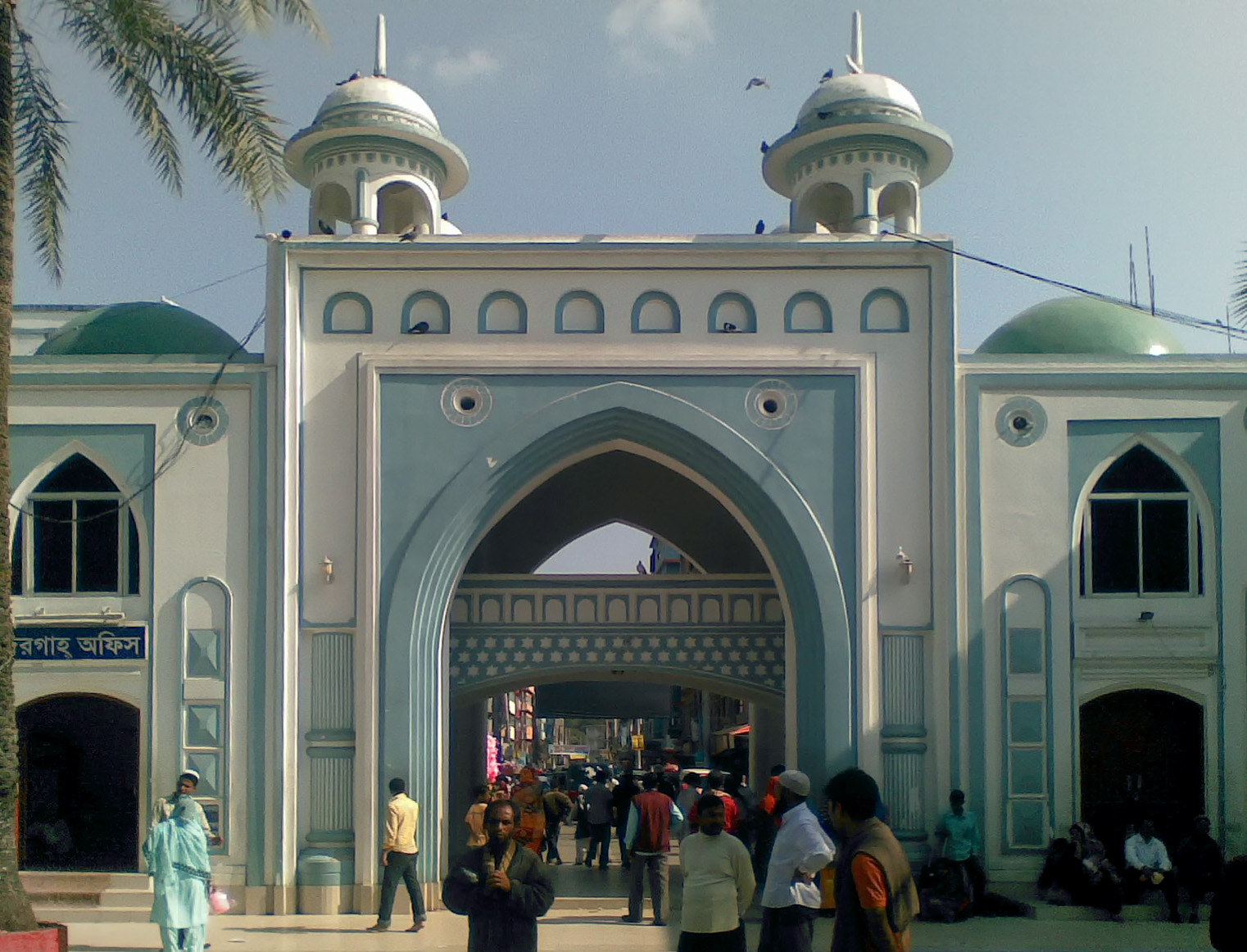
Shrine of Shah Jalal

Shah Jalal, a religious scholar and Sufi (mistic saint) from Yemen, was due to arrive in Bengal. After being commanded by his uncle, Sheikh Kabir before his journey to reside and propagate Islam in a region in which the soil matches the one that was given to him in his home country, Shah Jalal knew that it is in Srihatta where he shall reside in for the rest of his life. Shah Jalal journeyed eastward and reached India in c. 1300, where he met many great scholars and Sufi mystics. He arrived in the palace of Firoz Shah with his companions and expressed dedire to join the Sultan's army. The Sultan, after consecutive defeats and frustration in the army, become very happy with it.

Before arrival of Shah Jalal, they returned to Bengal where they heard that Govinda and his army blocked the crossing of the Borak River (present-day Surma River), as well as his companions who at this point numbered around 360. According to the legends, the river bank was spread over with rice as Govinda knew that Muslims don't walking over any food. Also, there were no boats available to cross the river. Shah Jalal had a pair of pigeon, given by another Indian saint Nizamuddin Awliya as a gift. He asked the pigeon to clear out a way to the river by eating the rice spread in the river bank. Once the pigeon eat the rice and made way to the river, he put his prayer mat over the water and asked everyone to hold hands each other with him and close their eyes. Miraculously, he crossed the river along with his companions. When Govinda saw the miracles, he left the palace with his family. The legends also say that upon the conquest, Shah Jalal called out for the adhan as the time for salah approached and the sound of adhan destroyed Govinda's seven-storey palace. Govinda's army also lost against Shah Jalal's army.

=== Capture of Taraf ===
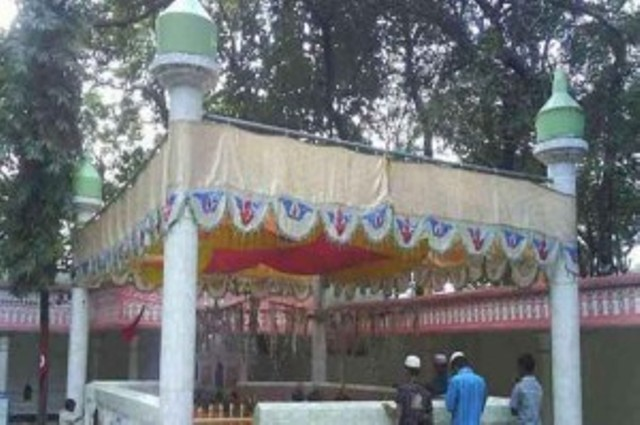
Shrine of Syed Nasiruddin in Murarband Darbar, Taraf (Chunarughat, Habiganj).

After the successful conquest of Gour, Syed Nasiruddin set off on an expedition against the feudal Raja Achak Narayan of Tungachal, which had been a part of the Gour Kingdom. Nasiruddin arrived with 1000 lascars and 12 saints sent by Shah Jalal to help him. He camped in a place now known as Laskarpur. Raja Achak Narayan was also defeated and fled with his family to Mathura. Following a victory, Tungachal was annexed to Bengal and renamed as Taraf. The 12 saints who accompanied Nasiruddin are as follows:

1. Shah Arifin (buried in Tahirpur)
2. Shah Tajuddin Qureshi (buried in Chowkhi Pargana, Sylhet)
3. Shah Ruknuddin Aswari (buried in Sarail)
4. Shah Badr (buried in Badarpur, Karimganj, India)
5. Shah Mahmud (buried in Urdu Bazar, Laskarpur)
6. Shah Sultan (buried in Badarpur, Mymensingh)
7. Shah Ghazi (buried in Bishgram, Sylhet)
8. Shah Badruddin (buried in Bakhshirghat, Chittagong)
9. Shah Majlis Amin (buried in Shankarpasha, Habiganj Sadar)
10. Shah Fateh Ghazi (buried in Fatehpur-Shahjibazar, Madhabpur)
11. Syed Shah Saif Minnatuddin (buried in Laskarpur)
12. Syed Ahmad Gesudaraz (buried in Kharampur Mazar Sharif, Brahmanbaria)

== Aftermath ==
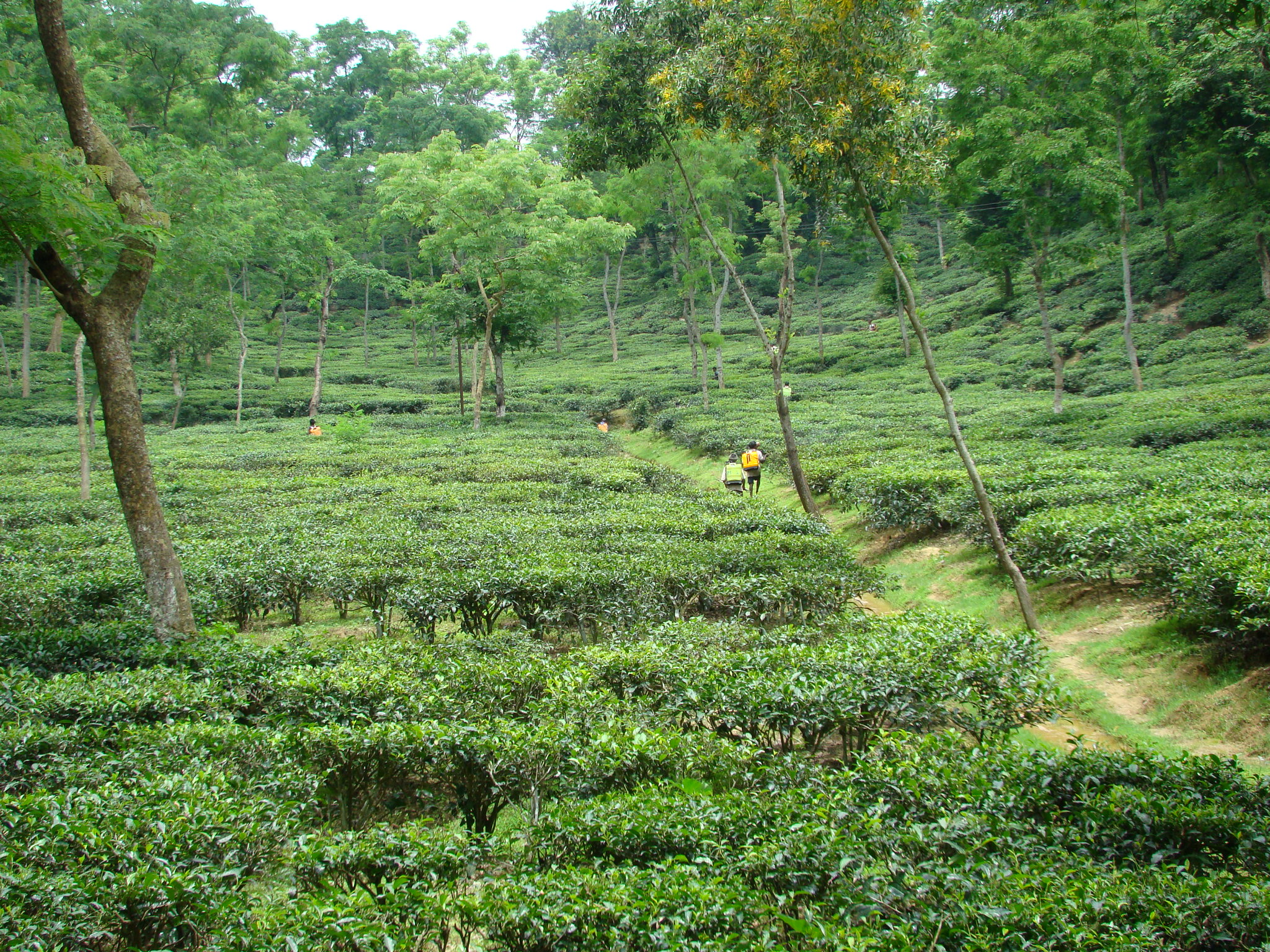
Malnichhera, now the oldest tea garden in South Asia, is home to the Harong Hurong cave which Govinda and his family supposedly retreated to.

After hearing that his commander Mona Rai was killed, Govinda was forced to retreat with his family to Harong Hurong cave in Malnicherra. He then went to the shrine of Grivakali, where he left his aunt, Apurna, and his cousin Garuda and cousin-in-law Shantipriya (or Shantirani) in the care of the priest. Following this, Govinda took his wife, Hiravati, and son, Nirvana, with him to Kamrup.

On the other hand, Garuda and his family, taking shelter at Grivakali shrine, then decided to head off to Tungachal (Taraf). They set on a boat at Dhanuhatta driven by the royal servants Ghaturam and Jharuram. However, they were seen by Subid, a rebel from the time of Raja Govardhan's fall, who informed the Muslims of their actions; leading to Garuda's boat being followed by the Muslims. Out of embarrassment, Garuda appeared to committed suicide, jumping off the boat at Puni Beel. The boatmen, however, continued taking Apurna and Shantipriya to Tungachal, eventually finding refuge with Raja Achak Narayan, though the boatmen themselves were killed. Apurna and Shantipriya made a vow in Tunganath Shiva temple to fast for ninety days, hoping for safety. The incident is mentioned in a ballad known as Shantiranir Baromashi (Shantirani's twelve months). She was said to have committed suicide after the fall of Tungachal.

After the conquest, Srihatta was effectively brought under Muslim control. Gour and Taraf were then incorporated into Shamsuddin Firoz Shah's domain with Sikandar Khan Ghazi being the first Wazir of Sylhet. According to tradition, another disciple of Shah Jalal, Shah Chashni Pir at this point compared the soil in Srihatta with that which was previously given by Ahmad Kabir, finding them to be identical. In any case, following the battle, Shah Jalal along with his followers permanently settled in Sylhet.

== Legacy ==
Gour was nicknamed Jalalabad after Shah Jalal for his aid in delivering Islam to the population. To this day, the remains of Gour Govinda's fort can be found in Chowhatta, Sylhet. Many of Shah Jalal's companions migrated to other places in Eastern India to preach Islam. The Muslims were not interested in conquering other neighbouring kingdoms such as Laur, Jaintia and Twipra, which would be conquered much later during Mughal rule and British rule.

A granite inscription dated (918 AH) 1512-13 AD during the reign of Alauddin Husain Shah, the Sultan of Bengal, records the conquest of Sylhet in (703 AH) 1302–1303 corresponding with the reign of Sultan Shamsuddin Firoz Shah (r. 1301–1316) as follows:

In honour of the exalted Shaykh al-Mashāyikh (spiritual master), Shaykh Jalāl ibn Muḥammad

The first Islamic conquest of the city in the 'arṣah (an administrative unit) of Sylhet was accomplished at the hand of Sikandar Khān Ghāzī during the reign of Sulṭān Fīruz Shāh Dalwi (Dahlawi), the year seven hundred three.

This edifice (has been erected) by Rukn Khān who conquered Hasht Kāmhāriyān (the eight tribes), being the vizier and the chief of the army for months at the time of the conquest of Kamrup and Kamta and Jaznagar and Orissa as he served the army at different places following the king in the year nine hundred and eighteen.

== See also ==
- Ghurid conquest of Bengal
- History of Sylhet
  - Muharram Rebellion
  - Revolt of Radharam
  - Nankar Rebellion
- Islam in Bengal
- Shah Paran
