= Haydar Ghazi =

Vizier of Sylhet (c. 14th century)

Nūr al-Hudā, Abu'l-Karāmāt Haydar Ghazi

Wazir of Srihat
- Monarch: Fakhruddin Mubarak Shah
- Preceded by: Sikandar Khan Ghazi
- Succeeded by: Unknown

Personal details
- Died: Sonargaon
- Relatives: Ali Sher Bengali (descendant)

Nūr al-Hudā Abū'l-Karāmāt as-Saʿīdī al-Ḥusaynī (Arabic: نور الهدىٰ أبو الكرمات السعيدي الحسيني), better known as Ḥaydar Ghāzī (Persian: حیدر غازی, Bengali: হায়দর গাজী), was the second wazir of Srihat (Sylhet) under the various Sultans of Sonargaon and Lakhnauti. Prior to this, Ghazi took part in the Conquest of Gour in 1303.

== Background and origin ==
During Shah Jalal's expedition towards the Indian subcontinent from Hadhramaut in Yemen, Jalal came across Haydar who joined him in his journey. However, it is unknown whereabouts in the Middle East that Haydar is exactly from.

== Career ==
After Shah Jalal was summoned by the Sultan Shamsuddin Firoz Shah to take part in the Conquest of Sylhet against Raja Gour Govinda, Haydar and the other companions joined him.

Following the death of Sylhet's first wazir, Sikandar Khan Ghazi, Shah Jalal, according to one source, appointed Haydar Ghazi as the second wazir to rule over Sylhet. It is unknown how long Haydar's governorship was but historians estimate his term finished some time after the death of Shah Jalal which was in 1346. The next known Wazir of Sylhet was Muqabil Khan who ruled in 1440.

After his rule in Sylhet, Haydar moved to Sonargaon where he spent the rest of his life. His mazar remains in Sonargaon (in Dhaka Division).

== Legacy ==
Haydar Ghazi's descendant by the name of Shaikh Ali Sher Bengali wrote a book called Commentary on the excursion of the souls (Arabic: شرح نزهة الأرواح, romanized: Sharḥ Nuzhat al-Arwāḥ) which contained one of the earliest biographies of Shah Jalal. However, Muhammad Mojlum Khan is of the solitary opinion that the biography was written by Haydar Ghazi himself, under his pen name Shaykh Noorul Huda Abul Karamat. The latter is most likely an error as the book was written in 1571, 2 centuries after the time of Haydar Ghazi. The Sharh written by Ali Sher is a primary source which inspired the later and more well-known - Gulzar-i-Abrar - a collection of Sufi saint biographies written by Muhammad Ghauth Shattari of Mandvi in 1613.

Political offices
Preceded by Sikandar Khan Ghazi	Wazir of Srihat; 14th century	Unknown

== See also ==
- Syed Nasiruddin
- History of Sylhet
