= Fateh Ghazi =

Sufi saint in Bengal (c. 14th century)

Shah Fateh Ghazi
- ফতেহ গাজী

Personal life
- Born: Baghdad
- Died: 14 December Fatehpur, Taraf, Sultanate of Bengal
- Resting place: Shahjibazar Dargah, Madhabpur, Habiganj, Bangladesh
- Relatives: Ahmed Ghazi, Masud Ghazi

Religious life
- Religion: Islam
- Denomination: Sunni

Muslim leader
- Period in office: Early 14th century

Shāh Sulaymān Fateḥ Ghāzī al-Baghdādī (Bengali: শাহ সোলেমান ফতেহ গাজী বগদাদী, Arabic: شاه سلیمان فتح غازی البغدادی), or simply known as Fateh Ghazi, was a 14th-century Sufi saint and ghazi who took part in Muslim expeditions in northeastern Bengal. His name is associated with the propagation of Islam in Madhabpur.

== Biography ==
His original name was Sulaiman, and he hailed from Baghdad. Shah Jalal was known to have passed through the city of Baghdad, which was under occupation by the Ilkhanate, the southwestern sector of the Mongol Empire ruled by Hulagu Khan.

In 1303, Fateh Ghazi participated in the Conquest of Sylhet under Shah Jalal. Soon after the victory, he was among the 12 disciples who were sent to capture Tungachal under the leadership of Syed Nasiruddin, a sipahsalar (military commander) of Sultan Shamsuddin Firuz Shah. Tungachal was renamed to Taraf and annexed to Muslim Bengal, after the defeat of its Raja Achak Narayn, who fled to Mathura with his family.

Ghazi settled in a nearby village in the Raghunandan Hills, after visiting Bejura, where he founded his own chilla-khana. The village was named Fatehpur (now Shahjibazar, Madhabpur) in his honour. Fateh Ghazi, Ahmed Ghazi, and Masud Ghazi are all buried next to each other in a dargah, located near the Shahjibazar railway station. His urs (death anniversary) continues to be celebrated in December by lakhs of people, to this day, at the Dargah-e-Hazrat Shah Soleman Fateh Gazi Bagdadi.

During his death anniversary in 2015, a controversy arose due to a puppet dance show being hosted next to his dargah.
