= Taraf (Bengal) =

Medieval Kingdom of Sylhet

Kingdom of Taraf তরফ রাজ্য
- c. 1200–c. 1610
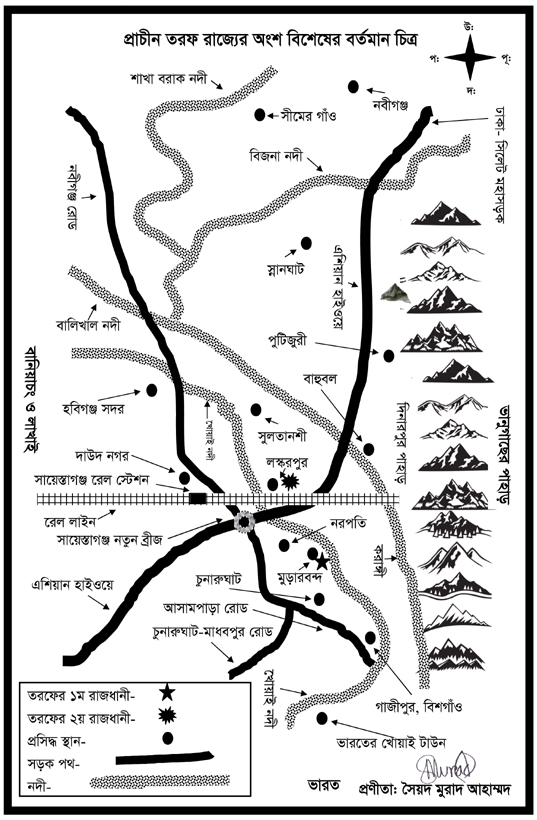
- Syed Murad Ahmad's map of Chunarughat, main Taraf, denoting both its modern and historical sites.
- Capital: Rajpur (1200–1304), Laskarpur (1304–1610)
- Recognised national languages: Middle Bengali, Persian
- Religion: Hinduism (1200–1304), Islam (1304–1610)
  - 1240–1253: Epivishnu (first)
  - 1253: Shandul
  - 1253–1260: Bhadra Janardan
  - 1260–1304: Achak Narayan
  - 1304–: Syed Nasiruddin
  - 1350s: Syed Sirajuddin
- Historical era: Classical period
  - Established: c. 1200
  - Disestablished: c. 1610
Preceded by	Succeeded by
Gour Kingdom	Twipra Kingdom; Mughal Empire
- Today part of: Bangladesh

Taraf (Bengali: তরফ/তরপ, romanized: Torof/Torop), previously known as Tungachal (Bengali: তুঙ্গাচল, romanized: Tungachol), was a feudal territory of the Sylhet region in Bengal and was under many petty kingdoms in different periods of time. It was part of what is present-day Habiganj District in Bangladesh.

Tungachal became a part of Brahmachal in 1170 AD and was annexed back to the Gour Kingdom in 1258 for a few years before being captured by the Twipra Kingdom. Gour Govinda, the king of Gour, would retake Tungachal in 1260. Following the capture of Taraf in 1304, the area came under the rule of Syed Nasiruddin and was renamed Taraf. The territory was transformed into a renowned centre of Islamic and linguistic education in the Indian subcontinent, hosting writers such as Syed Shah Israil, Syed Pir Badshah, and Syed Rayhan ad-Din. Taraf peacefully remained under the rule of Nasiruddin's descendants until the Twipra Kingdom conquered it. Not long after, Khwaja Usman would shortly take over Taraf until his defeat by the Mughal Empire. The Mughals made use of the fortified territory in their future battles. Taraf remained as an administrative pargana up until the Partition of India in 1947.

== Location ==
The headquarters of the territory has always been within the modern-day Chunarughat Upazila. The majority of Tungachal was a part of the modern-day Habiganj District and eastern borders of the Moulvibazar District. It was bounded by the Twipra Kingdom and Bejura pargana to the south, the Bhanugach Hills to the east, and Lakhai to the west. Following the establishment of Muslim rule, its territory was extended all the way south to Sarail and west to Joanshahi.

== Early history ==
Epivishnu is the earliest known ruler of this territory. He is considered to be a Tripuri, though he was a feudal ruler under Raja Upananda of Brahmachal and not the Twipra Kingdom. He ruled from the capital at Rajpur (modern-day Bishgaon/Bishgram, Chunarughat). It is said that the entire territory was named Tungachal after the birth of his son, Prince Tungamadhav. Epivishnu appointed Bhadra Janardan to be his minister and Raghu to be the army commander.

=== Gour attack ===
Annexation to Gour
Date	1258
Location	Banks of Ghungi Jurir Haor, Tungachal
Result	Shandul replaces Epivishnu as the ruler of Tungachal
Territorial changes	Tungachal secured under Gour administration

Belligerents
Tungachal Kingdom Brahmachal remnant officers	Gour Kingdom

Commanders and leaders
Raja Epivishnu †: General Raghu (POW); Minister Bhadra Janardan	Raja Govardhan: Minister Madan Rai; Commander-in-chief Virabhadra; Commander Shandul; Prince Garuda; Raja Amar Singh †

After the murder of Raja Upananda and the capture of Brahmanchal by Govardhan of Gour, this meant that Tungachal was now also a part of Gour by default. Epivishnu - who was not given a choice - was effectively under the control of Amar Singh, who was appointed by Govardhan to be in charge of Brahmanchal. Having close ties with the Brahmanchal rulers as well as the Twipra Kingdom, Epivishnu was adamant to Govardhan and Singh's amicable compromises. With Epivishnu refusing every pleasant proposal given to be a feudal ruler under Gour, Govardhan and Singh decided it was time that they dethrone Epivishnu and appoint someone else to govern Tungachal. The Gour forces entered Tungachal, and a battle emerged on the banks of the Ghungi Jurir Haor. Raja Epivishnu was murdered and his commander-in-chief General Raghu was kidnapped and taken as a captive back to Gour. Govardhan then appointed his second general, Shandul, to be the feudal ruler of Tungachal.

=== Annexation to Twipra ===
Ratan Manikya, king of Twipra, was informed of the murder of Epivishnu, who was a close associate. Manikya decided that the Gour administration was going too far and decided to put a stop to Govardhan's craving to invade neighbouring kingdoms. He sent a contingent towards Brahmanchal to attack Amar Singh. Singh's forces were outnumbered, and requested assistance from Govardhan. However, Govardhan was unable to help, as Gour was facing an invasion in the north from the Jaintia Kingdom. Singh was killed by the Twipra forces, and the Kuki chiefs saw this as an opportunity for them to annex Brahmanchal to the Twipra Kingdom. Jaidev Rai, son of the minister of Raja Upananda, who was the king of Brahmanchal before Amar Singh, was made the feudal ruler under the Twipras. They then proceeded to Tungachal in an attempt to dethrone Shandul. In fright, Shandul fled Tungachal for Gour, thus enabling the Twipras to bloodlessly annex Tungachal to its kingdom as well. Epivishnu's minister, Bhadra Janardan, was appointed as the feudal ruler of Tungachal under the Twipra Kingdom, as Epivishnu's son, Tungamadhav, was still a child.

=== Gour rule ===
Tungachal continued to be governed by Janardan as a part of Raja Ratan Manikya's Twipra Kingdom up until the ascension of Raja Govinda of Gour. By making peace with Ratan Manikya of Tripura and gifting him an elephant, Govinda was able to gain Tungachal back to Gour administration. Govinda's close friend Achak Narayan gained the respect of the Tungachal royal family by marrying the eight-year-old Princess Lalasa Devi. Through this marriage, Narayan was able to rightfully become the ruler of Tungachal, dismissing Bhadra Janardan, the former minister of Epivishnu. Narayan was a feudal ruler under Gour, with his sister, Hiravati, being married to Gour Govinda.

== Syed rule ==
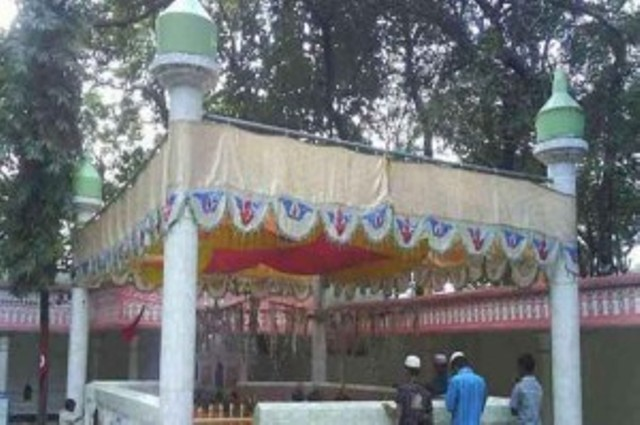
Shrine of Syed Nasiruddin in Murarband Darbar, Taraf (Chunarughat, Habiganj).

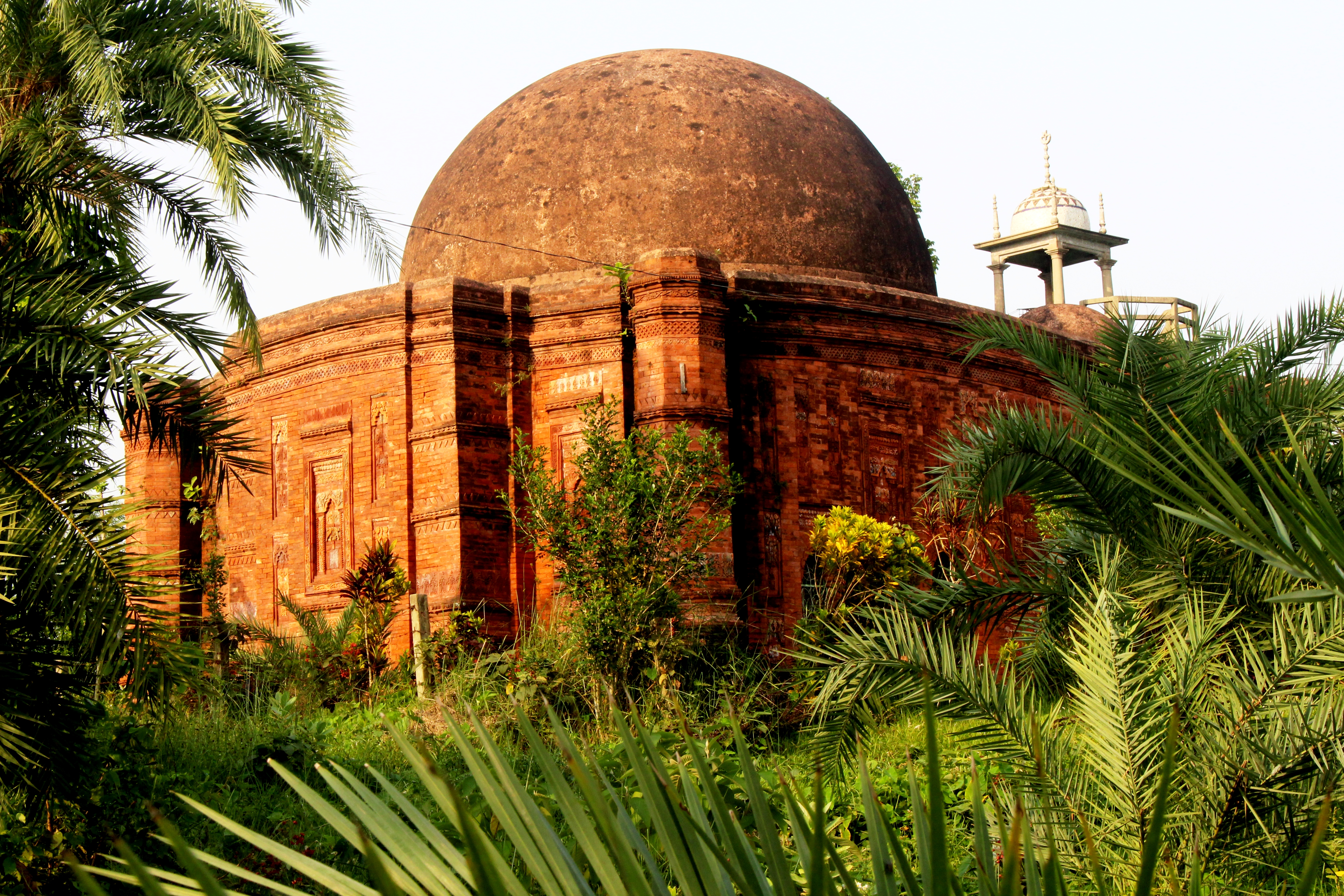
Shankarpasha Shahi Masjid is the location to start of Taraf conquest and was built by Shahjalal's disciple Majlis e Amin, one of the 12 saints sent to Taraf by Sahjalal.

There was also a minority of Muslim families who migrated to Tungachal, following the short-lived Azmardan Expedition in 1254 led by the Governor of Bengal, Malik Ikhtiyaruddin Iuzbak. Qazi Nuruddin, a rich cultivator, celebrated his son's marriage ceremony by slaughtering a cow for them to eat. Achak Narayan, in a fury for what he saw as sacrilege due to his Hindu beliefs, sentenced Nuruddin to death. Burhanuddin, a man punished by Govinda of Gour for also slaughtering a cow, as well as Nuruddin's brother, Halimuddin, travelled to lower Bengal, where they addressed their issues with Sultan Shamsuddin Firoz Shah of Lakhnauti.

In 1303, forces led by Sikandar Khan Ghazi and Shah Jalal defeated Govinda at Gour, annexing it to Shamsuddin Firuz Shah's sultanate. Govinda then fled with his family to Hurong Harong cave in Mulnicherra. He then went to the shrine of Grivakali, where he left his aunt, Apurna, and his cousin Garuda and Garuda's wife, Shantipriya, in the care of the priest. Garuda, Apurna, and Shantipriya, taking shelter at Grivakali shrine, then decided to head off to Tungachal. However, they were caught by Subid, a rebel from the time of Raja Govardhan, who informed the Muslims of their actions, leading to Garuda's boat being followed by the Muslims. Out of embarrassment, Garuda appeared to commit suicide, jumping off the boat at Puni Beel. The boatmen, however, continued taking Apurna and Shantipriya to Tungachal, eventually finding refuge with Achak Narayan. They made a vow in the Tunganath Shiva temple to fast for ninety days, hoping for safety.

Following the successful Islamic conquest of Gour, Syed Nasiruddin, Sultan Shamsuddin Firuz Shah's commander-in-chief, set off on an expedition to Tungachal in 1304. Nasiruddin arrived accompanied by 12 saints, and they camped in a place now known as Laskarpur. One of the saints, Majlis Amin, built the Shankarpasha Shahi Masjid. Achak Narayan was defeated and fled with his family to Mathura. Following a victory, Tungachal was annexed to Shamsuddin Firuz Shah's sultanate and renamed Taraf.

Syed Nasiruddin became the effective leader of Taraf, and his descendants continued to rule there. The capital would be shifted from Rajpur to Laskarpur. Nasiruddin's son, Syed Sirajuddin, would succeed him. Sirajuddin had two sons: Syed Musafir and Syed Faqir.

The elder son, Musafir, would succeed him as the ruler of Taraf. Musafir had four sons: Khudawand, Ismail, Sulayman, and Ibrahim. Taraf was transformed into an esteemed centre of study in the subcontinent. This is evident with the famous proverb associated with Taraf;

জায়গার নাম তরফ, ঘরে ঘরে হরফ
Jaygar naam Torof, ghore ghore horof

Translated, this means "The place is named Taraf, letters in every house". Syed Ibrahim was an Islamic scholar who was recognised by Delhi emperors and granted land in Sonargaon, where he moved to in his later life. Syed Khudawand had three sons: Mikail, Israil, and Sayef. Syed Israil wrote the Persian book Ma'dan al-Fawaid in 1534 and is considered to be the Sylhet region's first author. Mikail became the effective ruler of Taraf after his father, Khudawand, and he had four sons: Nazir Khan, Abbas, Musa, and Mina. There are claims that Syed Mina is the same person as Syed Sultan, although the dates do not seem to add up. Khudawand's grandson Syed Qalandar married the daughter of Sultan Bazid of Pratapgarh.

== Twipra attack ==
Rajmala excerpt

কেহ ভয়ে, কেহ প্রীতে, কেহ মান্যে দিল
Keho bhoye, keho prite, keho mainne dilo
Some out of fear, some out of love, some out of respect
বার বাঙ্গালায় দিছে তরপে না দিল
Baro Bangalay dise, Torope na dilo
All the Baro-Bhuiyans provided, except Taraf
এ কথা শুনিয়া রাজা বড় ক্রোধ হৈল।
E kotha shuniya Raja boro krodh hoilo
Hearing this, the King became very furious

— Translated from Kokborok to Bengali

Battle of Jilkua
Date	1581
Location	Jilkua, Taraf
Result	Taraf is defeated, its leaders imprisoned
Territorial changes	Taraf annexed to Twipra Kingdom

Belligerents
Taraf	Twipra Kingdom

Commanders and leaders
Fateh Khan (POW); Syed Musa (POW); Syed Adam Bairam (POW)	Amar Manikya; Commander-in-chief Rajdhar Manikya I Supported by:Baro-Bhuiyan: Naval Commander Isa Khan

Strength
	22,000

Syed Musa was the successor of Syed Mikail, and his reign marked the end of the Syed dynasty of Taraf. It was also during his rule that the Bengal Sultanate fell in 1576, leading the nobles of Bengal to become fiercely independent local rulers forming an anti-Mughal confederacy known as the Baro-Bhuiyans.

Amar Manikya of the Manikya dynasty of Twipra, just south of Taraf, was digging a tank, now known as Amar Sagar, in his capital at Udaipur for religious reasons. He demanded that various chieftains supply labour for this task and pay tribute to Twipra. The Rajmala chronicles highlight all the donations provided by the Baro-Bhuiyans, numbering at least over 500 labourers. Syed Musa was the only ruler to refuse to accept such subordination, as he viewed Taraf to be an independent principality. This angered Amar Manikya, and he sent his son, Prince Rajdhar, to deal with him. Musa called upon Fateh Khan, a Baro-Bhuyan zamindar of Sylhet, who came to his aid. In 1581, a battle took place in the village of Jilkua in Chunarughat. Isa Khan was appointed as Manikya's naval commander. The Tripuris were victorious, and Syed Musa and his son Syed Adam were taken as prisoners. Syed Musa was imprisoned in Udaipur, but Adam was eventually set free. The Twipra army then proceeded to Gudhrail, via Dinarpur and the Surma River, where they defeated Fateh Khan with the help of their elephants. Khan was captured and transported to Udaipur via Dulali and Ita. He was treated well and later released. Amar Manikya was very proud of the successful conquest of Taraf and even minted a coin referring to himself as the Conqueror of Sylhet. This coin was in the possession of Bir Bikram Kishore Debbarman in the 20th century.

Some historians suggest that Syed Musa of Taraf is the same person as the Syed Musa of Arakan. They claim that Musa was appointed as a minister in the Arakanese court, and it was under his patronage that Alaol completed Saiful Mulk Badi Uzzamal. Ayesha A. Irani, a scholar of early modern Islamic Bangla literature, has argued against this theory on the grounds that the dates do not match up.

== Mughal rule ==
Mughal conquest of Taraf
Date	1610
Location	Fort of Taraf
Result	Mughal victory
Territorial changes	Taraf annexed to Mughal Empire

Belligerents
Eastern Afghan Confederates in Taraf	Mughal Empire (Bengal Subah)

Commanders and leaders
Khwaja Usman; Khwaja Mumriz (surrendered); Khwaja Malhi (surrendered); Baaz †	Jahangir; Islam Khan I Haji Shamsuddin Baghdadi; Mirza Saqi; Baqi; Pattani
- Taraf chiefs escape to Usmangarh (Uhar)

Although the Bengal Sultanate was defeated, the Mughal Empire took a very long time to defeat the local chieftains across Bengal. Many rebellious Afghans led by Khwaja Usman migrated to the Sylhet region as it was seen as a safe zone for them due to the strong insurgency of rebellious chieftains. Usman managed to gain control of Taraf and then appointed his brother Khwaja Malhi and his son Khwaja Mumriz to govern the territory, in which they built a lofty fort. After the capture of Baniachong, Islam Khan I, the Subahdar of Bengal, then appointed Haji Shamsuddin Baghdadi and the three brothers, Mirza Saqi, Baqi, and Pattani, to carry out a campaign against Malhi and Mumriz of Taraf and Pahlawan of Matang. He ordered Shamsuddin to build a fort in between Matang and Taraf. The Mughal forces reached the location in a few days and raised a strong, deeply-trenched fort. They plundered the neighbouring villages surrounding the fort. News of this reached Malhi and Mumriz, who decided to get ready for a battle. Leaving a small garrison at their own fort at Taraf, they set off on an expedition to attack the Mughal fort. They started marching at midday and reached the fort the next morning after six pahars. The Baharistan-i-Ghaibi highlights the terror experienced by the Mughal forces in this battle and mentions that it reminded them of the Day of Resurrection. The Mughals launched arrows and cannonballs from their fort, showering them over the Afghans. The Afghans managed to charge in unison, behind a war elephant named Baaz, towards the gate of the fort. In the midst of the battle, the front and back drivers of Baaz were killed and lay wounded. Shamsuddin then emerged from the left trench and managed to close off the fort gate with his soldiers. They then killed the elephant. The Afghans offered a hand-fight to which they were driven out.

The Afghans entered the fort two more times and were driven out again and again. In the fourth assault, the Afghans were finally defeated, and they fled to Khwaja Usman, who was at Uhar, thus leading to a Mughal victory and establishing Mughal rule in Taraf.

Taraf was incorporated into the Sarkar of Sylhet. The Mughals made use of the fort at Taraf, often camping whilst on expeditions to defeat other rebellious chieftains such as Pahlawan of Matang and Bayazid Karrani II of Sylhet. During the expedition against the latter, the Mughal forces camped at Taraf for one day, in which they were given the news of the birth of a son of Mirza Nathan, a Mughal officer. Ihtimam Khan's camp was joyous of this occasion, and Ihtimam celebrated by bringing out two of his strongest elephants to fight each other outside the fort of Taraf. In the final expedition against Khwaja Usman at Uhar, Shuja'at Khan rested at the fort of Taraf for a day and left a garrison there before proceeding. Mukarram Khan was briefly the Sardar of Sylhet in 1617 before being replaced by Mirak Bahadur Jalair at Sylhet and Sulayman Banarsi at Taraf and Uhar. Banarsi died in 1620, and Taraf was then governed by his son, who was most probably Tufan Bahadur.

The Syeds remained influential zamindars in Taraf despite the Mughal rule. Syed Nurul Hasan (better known as Syed Shah Nuri), son of Syed Musa, gained permission from the emperor to separate from Taraf and form his own pargana, known as Nurul Hasan Nagar, with Pail Haveli as its headquarters. His son, Syed Pir Badshah, was the writer of Ganj-e-Taraz and the dargah at Pail holds his tomb along with the descendants of this Pail branch of the Syeds of Taraf.

== British rule ==
With the establishment of the East India Company and later the British Raj, Taraf continued to exist as a pargana, or fiscal division, within Sylhet. Its area was 79.65 square miles, consisted of 1601 estates, and had a land revenue of £4400 as of 1875. The Nurul Hasannagar pargana was 4.89 square miles, consisted of 70 estates, and had a land revenue of £2788.

The erstwhile Zamindar of Taraf, Syed Riyazur Rahman, was granted the title of Chowdhury by the Mughal emperor Shah Alam II in 1770. During the rebellion of Agha Muhammad Reza in 1799 near Sylhet, Reza invited other local zamindars to also rebel against the British colonials. Riyazur Rahman, who opposed the forced taxing of the natives introduced by the British, initiated a rebellion in Taraf but was shortly suppressed.

== List of rulers ==
Ruler	Reign	Notes
Independence from Gour, Feudal to Brahmachal (1170)
Epivishnu (এপিবিষ্ণু)	1240–1253	Feudal ruler of Tungachal under Upananda of Brahmanchal
Annexed to Gour (1253)
Shandul ()	1253	Feudal ruler of Tungachal under Govardhan of Gour
Annexed to Tripura (1253)
Bhadra Janardan (ভদ্র জনার্দন)	1253–1260	Feudal ruler of Tungachal under Ratan Manikya of Tripura
Annexed to Gour
Achak Narayan (আচক নারায়ণ)	1260–1304	Feudal Raja of Tungachal under Gour Govinda
Islamic Conquest of Sylhet, end of Gour Kingdom
Syed Nasiruddin (সৈয়দ নাসিরুদ্দীন)	1304	Feudal ruler of Taraf under Sultan Shamsuddin Firoz Shah
Syed Sirajuddin (সৈয়দ সিরাজুদ্দীন)	1350s	Feudal ruler of Taraf, sons: Musafir and Faqir
Syed Musafir (সৈয়দ মুসাফির)		Sons: Khudawand, Sulayman, Ismail, Ibrahim
Syed Khudawand (সৈয়দ খোদাওয়ান্দ)		Sons: Mikail, Israil Bondegi, Bondegi Sayef
Syed Mikail (সৈয়দ মিকাইল)		Sons: Nazir, Abbas, Musa, Mina
Syed Musa (সৈয়দ মূসা)	1580s	Relied upon Fateh Khan of Sylhet. Married the daughter of Raja Marhamat Khan of Pratapgarh.
Annexed to Twipra Kingdom
Annexed to Khwaja Usman
Khwaja Malhi and Khwaja Mumriz (খাজা মালহী, খাজা মুমরিজ)	1610	Feudal rulers of Taraf under Khwaja Usman
Annexed to Mughal Empire
Mubariz Khan (মুবারিজ খান)	1612–1617	Sardar of Sylhet under Emperor Jahangir
Mukarram Khan (মুকাররম খান)	1617	Sardar of Sylhet under Emperor Jahangir
Sulayman Banarsi (সুলেমান বানারসী)	1617–1620	Co-Sardar of Taraf and Uhar under Emperor Jahangir
Tufan Bahadur (তুফান বাহাদুর)	1620s	The Baharistan mentions Banarsi's son as successor and the only son attributed to Banarsi is Tufan
Annexed to British Raj
Syed Riyazur Rahman (সৈয়দ রিয়াজ়ুর রহমান)	1770–1800	The Bengali Syed dynasty remained as Zamindars of Taraf throughout history and should not be confused with imperial administrators.

== See also ==
- Laur Kingdom

== Bibliography ==
- Choudhury, Achyut Charan (2006) [1917], Srihatter Itibritta: Uttarrangsho (in Bengali), Kolkata: Basanti Press
