= Sikandar Khan Ghazi =

Vizier of Sylhet (c. 1303)

Shaheed Sikandar Khan Ghazi

Wazir of Srihat
- In office 1303–?
- Monarch: Shamsuddin Firuz Shah
- Preceded by: Raja Gour Govinda
- Succeeded by: Haydar Ghazi

Personal details
- Died: before 1346 Surma River

Sikandar Khān Ghāzī (Persian: سکندر خان غازی, Bengali: সিকান্দার খান গাজী) was the first wazir of Srihat under the Lakhnauti Kingdom ruled by Shamsuddin Firuz Shah. Prior to this, Khan was one of the commanders of the Battles of Gour during the Conquest of Sylhet in 1303. Early Persian manuscripts and inscriptions relating to Shah Jalal name Sikandar Khan Ghazi as well, highlighting his role as a commander in the battles.

== Background ==
Sikandar Khan Ghazi's maternal uncle was the Sultan of Lakhnauti, Shamsuddin Firuz Shah. He was of Turco-Persian tradition, and entered Bengal alongside Firuz.

== Career ==
Sikandar Khan was appointed as a commander of an army and took part in many expeditions across Bengal. He defeated Raja Matuk of the Sundarbans in South Bengal. He accompanied Firuz in the conquests of Sonargaon and Satgaon, before reaching the Sylhet region.

Shaykh Burhanuddin, a Muslim living in Tultikar, Gour, notified Shamsuddin Firuz Shah of the injustice he was facing and Firuz ordered Sikandar to lead the expedition to Gour Kingdom. Sikandar's army, however, were inexperienced in the foreign hilly terrain and had no option but to retreat back to Bengal to avoid casualties. When Shah Jalal arrived in Bengal, Sikandar met him and greeted him with respect. He asked the cleric to join him in the expedition and that it is not the Raja's wealth and property which he wants but rather to propagate Islam in the Sylhet region. With the assistance of Shah Jalal and Syed Nasiruddin, the Conquest of Gour was successful. The King of the Gour Kingdom, Raja Gour Govinda escaped to Harong Hurong cave and was never heard of again.

Following the conquest, Sikandar was made the wazir and ruled over Sylhet. He reportedly ruled from modern-day Badarpur in Karimganj towards the east of the Sylhet region. Ghazi's drawing room can be seen in the village of Gorkapon sitting on the banks of the Barak River.

Sikandar's death

তখনে মরিল সেই শাহ সিকান্দর
Tokhone morilo shei Shah Shikandor
It was then that Sikandar Shah passed away
বেসরদার হৈল তবে ছিলট নগর
Be-shordar hoilo tobe Silot Nogor
Sylhet town became sardar-less
এজন্যে হযরত শাহ জালাল এমনী
Ejonne Hazrat Shah Jalal Yemeni
For that reason, Hazrat Shah Jalal of Yemen
নিযুক্ত করিল এক সরদার তখনি
Nijukto korilo ek shordar tokhoni
Appointed another sardar at the time

— Tarikh-e-Jalali

== Death ==
Khan drowned whilst journeying on a boat to catch fish in at the junction of the Surma, Barak and Kushiyara rivers in Badarpur. His body was never found. Due to this he is considered a shaheed (martyr) in Islam. He was succeeded by Haydar Ghazi, who was appointed by Shah Jalal himself. This shows that Khan's death took place before 1346, which was the year of Shah Jalal's death. There is a poem found in the biography of Shah Jalal, Tarikh-e-Jalali, which mentions the incident.

Preceded by Gour Govinda	Wazir of Srihat; 1303-	Succeeded by Haydar Ghazi

== See also ==
- Syed Nasiruddin
