= Chunarughat Upazila =

Chunarughat চুনারুঘাট
- Upazila
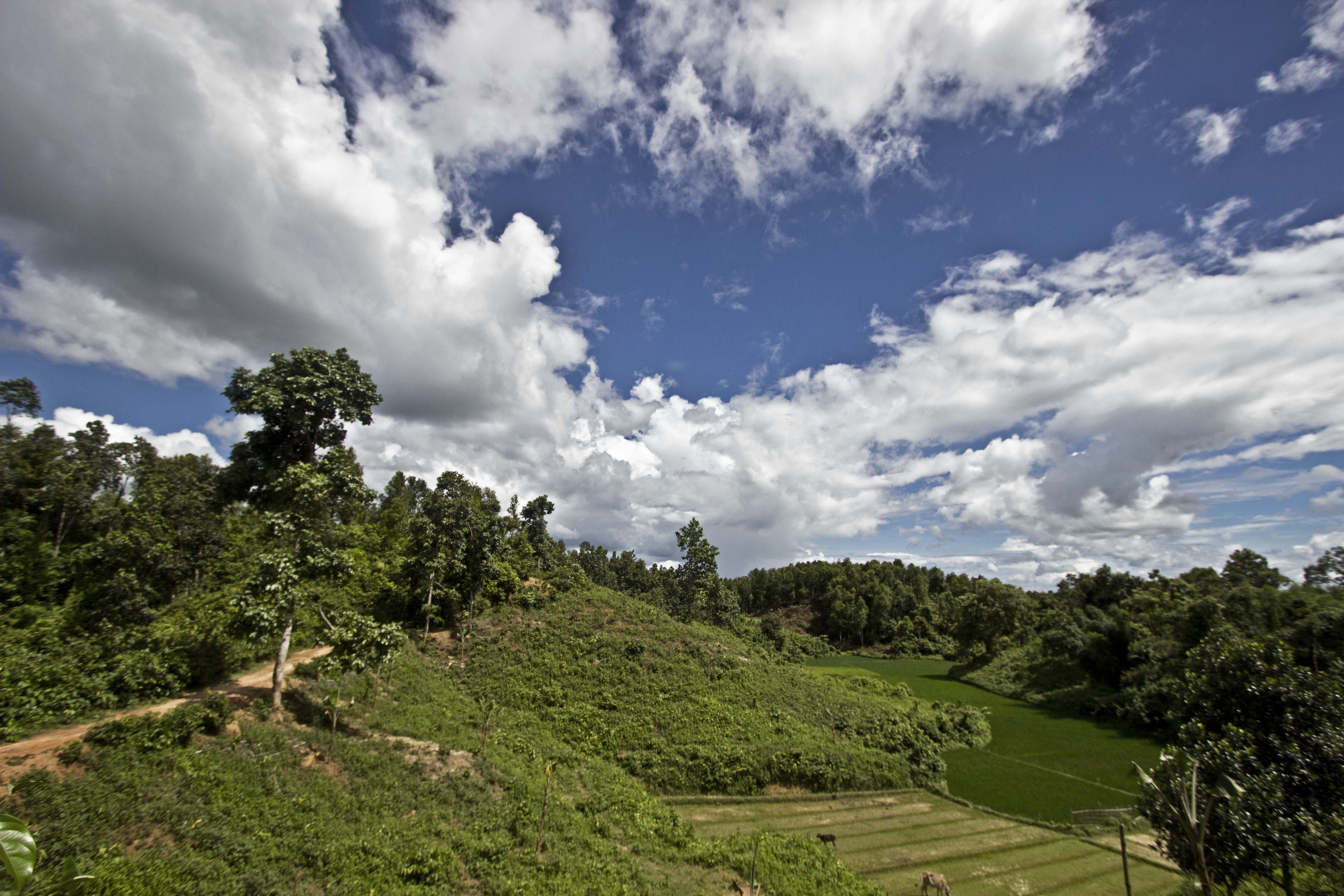
- Fields in Rema-Kalenga Wildlife Sanctuary

- Coordinates: 24°12.5′N 91°31.3′E
- Country: Bangladesh
- Division: Sylhet
- District: Habiganj

Area
  - Total: 495.50 km^{2} (191.31 sq mi)

Population (2022)
  - Total: 342,289
  - Density: 690.80/km^{2} (1,789.2/sq mi)
- Demonym: Chunarughati
- Time zone: UTC+6 (BST)
- Postal code: 3320
- Area code: 08325
- Website: chunarughat.habiganj.gov.bd

Chunarughat Upazila mauza geocode map

Chunarughat (Bengali: চুনারুঘাট), is an Upazila of Habiganj District in the Division of Sylhet, Bangladesh.

== Geography ==
Chunarughat is located at 24.2083°N 91.5222°E. It has 61,132 households and total area 495.50 km^{2}.

== History ==
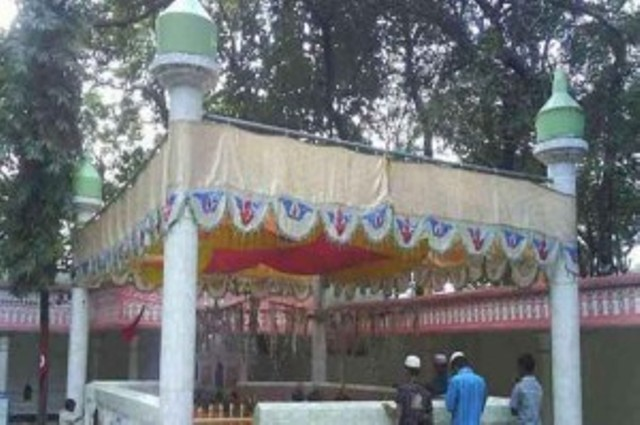
Mazar Sharif of Syed Nasiruddin in Murarband Darbar Sharif.

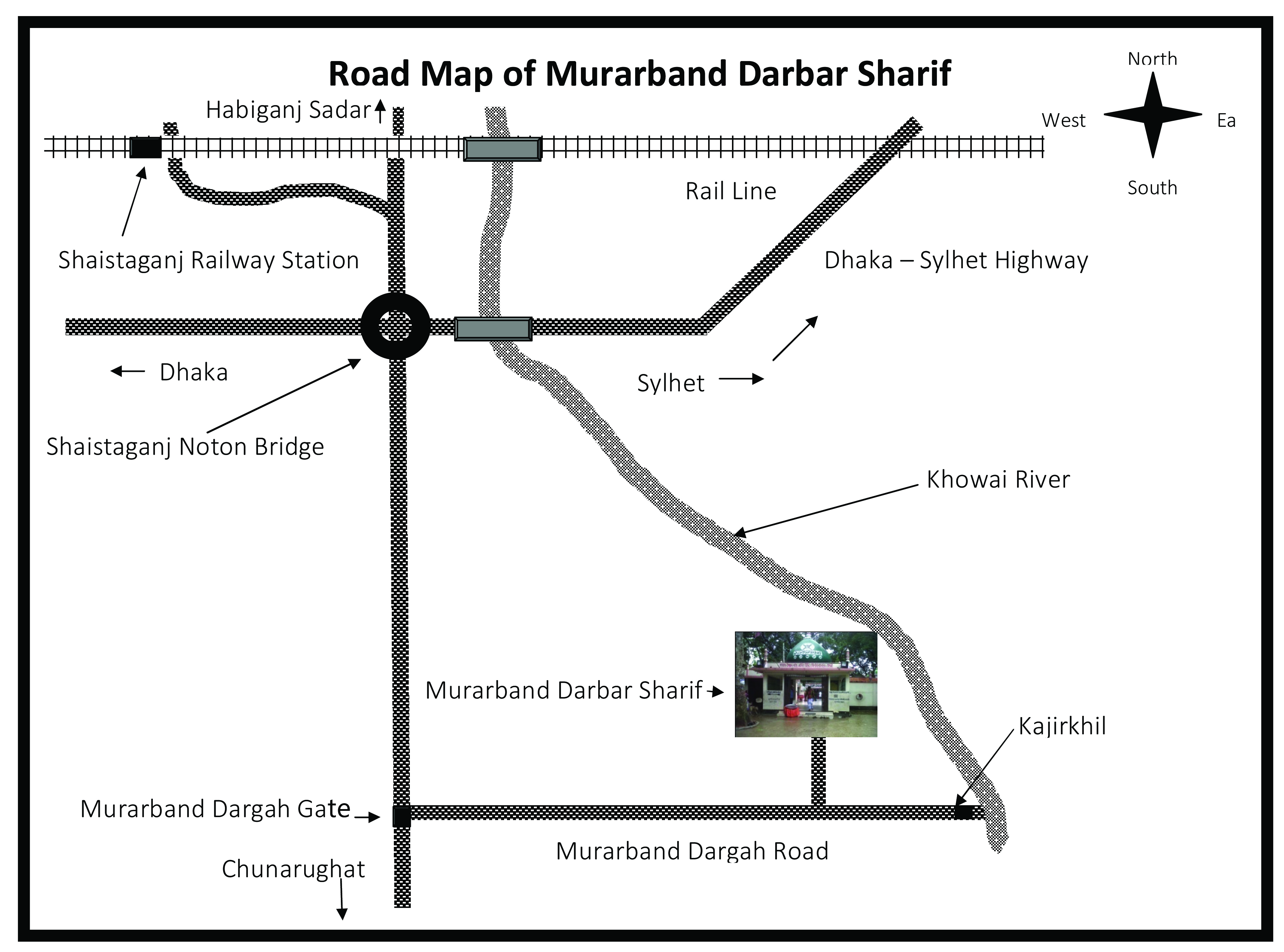
Road Map of Murarband Darbar Sharif

Rajapur (Tekarghat) in Chunarughat was the capital of the Hindu kingdom of Tungachal. Raja Achak Narayan was its final Hindu ruler who was defeated in the Capture of Taraf in 1304. Tungachal was renamed Taraf and its first Muslim ruler was Syed Nasiruddin, who is buried in the famous Murarband Dargah Sharif. Syed Shah Israil wrote the Persian book Ma'dan al-Fawaid in 1534, is considered to be Sylhet's first author. The Battle of Jilkua took place in Chunarughat in 1581 between the Taraf and Twipra kingdoms. The Khowai River was the only mode of transport and communication with other places. A ghat was situated in the river's western bank in the Borail mauza. A famous lime (known as chun in Bengali) trader had a business at the ghat which was famed throughout Taraf. Thus, the name came to be known as Chunarughat. In 1914, the Chunarughat thana was established. During the Bangladesh Liberation War of 1971, a mass killing was orchestrated in Nalua Tea Garden. Chunarughat Thana was upgraded to an upazila in 1983. There is now a memorial monument in Chunarughat.

== Demographics ==
Religions in Chunarughat Upazila (2022)
Religion	Percent
Islam	79.10%
Hinduism	20.56%
Other or not stated	0.34%

According to the 2022 Bangladeshi census, Chunarughat Upazila had 76,301 households and a population of 342,289. 10.67% of the population were under 5 years of age. Chunarughat had a literacy rate (age 7 and over) of 70.21%: 72.36% for males and 68.25% for females, and a sex ratio of 92.59 males for every 100 females. 35,008 (10.23%) lived in urban areas. Ethnic population was 28439 (8.31%), of which Munda were 10304, Santal 3006 and Oraon 2028.

Population of upazila by ethnicity (2022)
1. Bengali (91.7%)
2. Munda (3.01%)
3. Others (5.30%)

According to the 2011 Census of Bangladesh, Chunarughat Upazila had 61,132 households and a population of 302,110. 81,959 (27.13%) were under 10 years of age. Chunarughat had a literacy rate (age 7 and over) of 40.78%, compared to the national average of 51.8%, and a sex ratio of 1054 females per 1000 males. 19,651 (6.50%) lived in urban areas. Ethnic population was 39,286 (13.00%), of which Munda were 8,088, Santal 3,157 and Oraon 1,668.

As of the 1991 Bangladesh census, Chunarughat has a population of 233752. Males constitute 50.2% of the population, and females 49.8%. This Upazila's eighteen up population is 119571. Chunarughat has an average literacy rate of 49.2% (7+ years), and the national average of 32.4% literate.

== Archaeological heritage ==
=== Chunarughat ===
- Rema-Kalenga Wildlife Sanctuary, Chunarughat Upazila
- Shankarpasha Shahi Masjid, Chunarughat Upazila
- Murarband Dargah Sharif, Chunarughat
- Hujra Khana of Syed Nasir Uddin, Murarbandar Dargah Sharif, Chunarughat.
- Shajeerbazar, Chunarughat Upazila
- Barkota Railway Station, Chunarughat Upazila
- Sakir Muhammad Railway Station, Chunarughat Upazila
- Sutang Bazar Railway Station, Chunarughat Upazila
- Chunarughat Railway Station, Chunarughat Upazila
- Ancient limestone quarries, Chunarughat
- Tea Gardens of Chunarughat
- Amu Road Railway Station, Chunarughat Upazila
- Assampara Railway Station, Chunarughat Upazila
- Balla Railway Station, Chunarughat Upazila
- Balla Land Port (Bangladesh's no. 23 border land port) Balla, Chunarughat Upazila
- Balla Border Check Post Custom & Immigration Authority, Chunarughat Upazila

== Administration ==
Chunarughat Upazila is divided into Chunarughat Municipality and ten union parishads: Ahmadabad, Chunarughat, Deorgachh, Gazipur, Mirashi, Paikpara, Ranigaon, Shankhala, Shatiajuri, and Ubahata. The union parishads are subdivided into 165 mauzas and 373 villages.

== Railroad ==
- Habiganj Bazar–Shaistaganj–Balla line

Shaistaganj-Habiganj railroad section's four railway station established by Assam Bengal railway 1928

- Habiganj Bazar
- Habiganj Court
- Dhuliakhal
- Paikpara

Shaistaganj Junction

N.B.: Shaistaganj railway station established by Assam Bengal railway 1903. In 1928-29 when the Habiganj Bazar-Shaistaganj-Balla railway link was opened, it became a junction railway station.

Shaistaganj-Chunarughat railroad section's seven railway station established by Assam Bengal railway 1929

- Barkota
- Sakir Muhammed
- Sutang Bazar
- Chunarughat
- Amu Road
- Assampara
- Balla

Habiganj Bazar–Shaistaganj–Balla line During the colonial British rule, train services were started by rail at Habiganj Mahukuma in Sylhet district of the then (Undivided British-India) Assam province. In 1928, the British government built the Habiganj Bazar-Shaistaganj-Balla line as railway line and built infrastructure.

The railway line was opened by the Assam Bengal Railway by the then British government from Habiganj district headquarters town to Balla border via Shaistaganj junction, about 45 or 52 kilometers long railway line.

Of these, the Shaistaganj-Habiganj (15 or 16 km) railway line was inaugurated in 1928 and the Shaistaganj-Balla (30 or 36 km) railway line was inaugurated in 1929.

Coal-engined trains used to run between eight stations at Habiganj Bazar, Habiganj Court, Shaistaganj Junction, Sakir Mohammad, Chunarughat, Amuroad, Assampara and Balla bordering Tripura.

Of these, Chunarughat, Amur road and Assampara stations were of great importance. Tea produced in 22 tea gardens from those three stations was transported by rail.

At that time, this railway was the only means of exporting tea leaves of 13 gardens of Chunarughat upazila of Habiganj at a low cost and importing related items including garden rations.

There are a total of 4 stations on the Shaistaganj-Habiganj railway line (excluding Shaistaganj Junction), namely: Habiganj Bazar, Habiganj Court, Dhuliakhal and Paikpara. The Shaistaganj-Balla railway line has a total of 7 stations (excluding Shaistaganj Junction), namely: Barkula, Shakir Muhammed, Sutang Bazar, Chunarughat, Amu Road, Assampara and Balla.

After the independence of Bangladesh, the importance of the Balla train increased further. For this reason, the railway authorities built two more stations named Sutang Bazar and Barkula, known as remote areas.

At that time, the role of the train in bringing back refugees from India was commendable. At that time, a diesel engine was added to the ballar train. The train used to travel twice a day from Habiganj to the border station Balla.

After the end of the refugee transportation phase, the smugglers took over the train in Balla. Later, the train of Balla became a train of smugglers. At first, the passengers protested about this, but later the passengers got the opportunity to travel without a ticket.

In such a situation, the running train suffered losses. The railway authorities suspended the renovation work of the railway line. The train continues at great risk. The speed comes down to 15 kilometers.

During the tenure of the military ruler Ershad government, the train movement on this route was stopped unannounced for the first time. In the face of the movement of passengers, the train started running again within a week. A few days after the BNP came to power in 1991, the movement of the ballar train was again stopped unannounced.

Various social organizations started a movement demanding the movement of trains. For this reason, the government decided to run the train under private management. After running under private management for some time, the train was stopped again.

After the Awami League government came to power in 1996, the then Finance Minister late Shah AMS Kibria, (Member of parliament) elected from Habiganj Sadar-Lakhai Upazila (Habiganj-3) constituency, under the sincere political efforts of the late Shah AMS Kibria, the railway line was upgraded in 2000. Although the train service was started, the last train movement on this line was stopped in 2003.

Ever since the undeclared closure of the BNP-Jamaat coalition government, an influential quarter has been looking at the huge resources of the railways. Around 2005, about 15 kilometers of railway line from Habiganj Bazar to Shaistaganj railway junction was removed on the pretext of making a road. Later, the railway line from Shaistaganj to Habiganj was lifted and a bypass road was constructed.

The Habiganj-Balla train could not be restarted even after a long time. Railway land worth crores of rupees has been occupied by breaking the name of politics. Railway employees who used to stay at different stations are also living by occupying railway land and constructing buildings. Some employees are pocketing money by constructing buildings on railway land and installing tenants.

In 2003, the railway line was abandoned after the train service on this route was stopped. Since then, railway property worth crores of rupees has been looted. In the meantime, valuable equipment of the road and furniture of the station house have been looted.

Now the railway land is being occupied. A section of people are occupying these lands and building buildings. They are cultivating various crops. The name of Shaistaganj Junction is associated with the abandoned railway line. The locals demanded that the train be restarted on this railway line soon to protect the tradition of the junction.

After the Awami League government came to power in 2008, railway minister late Suranjit Sengupta was accorded a reception by the people of Shaistaganj. At that time, he assured that the Balla train would be started within a few days. When Suranjit Sen became a political victim, the train from Habiganj Sadar to Balla could not be started again.

The train from Habiganj Sadar to Balla is still closed. Locals said four of the habiganj-Shaistaganj-Balla railway stations are located in Habiganj Sadar upazila and seven in Chunarughat upazila. Shaistaganj Junction in Shaistaganj Upazila. That is why on the eve of the 11th parliamentary election, various demands were raised from the common people, including the introduction of the Ballar train from Habiganj Sadar, the recovery of the land of the train.

During the election campaign, Awami League leaders also assured to start the Ballar train from Habiganj Sadar, but even after the past years, no word has been uttered from the leaders about the introduction of the train. The expectations of the people of Chunarughat-Madhabpur upazila (Habiganj-4) have increased a lot after Mahbub Ali, (Member of parliament), became the state minister for civil aviation and tourism.

Railway History

The Habiganj Bazar–Shaistaganj–Balla line is a railway line connecting Akhaura and Chhatak, via Kulaura in Bangladesh. This line is under the jurisdiction of Bangladesh Railway. Shaistaganj Junction railway station is a junction station situated in Shayestaganj Upazila of Habiganj District in Bangladesh. It was opened in 1903 on Akhaura–Kulaura–Chhatak line. Then it became a junction station when Habiganj Bazar–Shaistaganj–Balla line railway was opened in 1928–29. But later in 2003, that line was abandoned as is closed in an unannounced manner and in 2005, the Habiganj Bazar–Shaistaganj line was taken off.

In response to the demands of the Assam tea planters for a railway link to Chittagong port, Assam Bengal Railway started construction of a railway track on the eastern side of Bengal in 1891. A 150 kilometres (93 mi) track between Chittagong and Comilla was opened to traffic in 1895. The Comilla–Akhaura–Kulaura–Badarpur section was opened in 1896–98 and extended to Lumding by 1903.

The Kulaura-Sylhet section was opened 1912–15, the Shaistaganj-Habiganj branch line in 1928, the Shaistaganj–Balla branch line in 1929 and the Sylhet–Chhatak Bazar line in 1954.

A metre gauge link exists between Shahbajpur in Bangladesh and Mahisasan in India.

== Notable people ==
- Mamun Chowdhury, British businessman
- M. A. Rashid, Vice-Chancellor of East Pakistan University of Engineering and Technology
- Syed Mahibul Hasan, politician
- Syed Nasiruddin, Sipahsalar for Shamsuddin Firuz Shah
- Syed Sayedul Haque Suman, lawyer and politician

== See also ==
- Upazilas of Bangladesh
- Districts of Bangladesh
- Divisions of Bangladesh
