= Garuda of Gour =

Prince Garuda
- Crown Prince of Gour
- Predecessor: Raja Govardhan
- Born: Garuda; 13th century Gour Kingdom
- Died: 1303; Puni beel
- Wife: Shantipriya
- Mother: Apurna
- Religion: Hinduism

Prince Garuda, was a 14th-century Hindu prince and heir apparent of King Govardhan of Gour, he is known for his participation in the Conquest of Sylhet.

== Early life ==
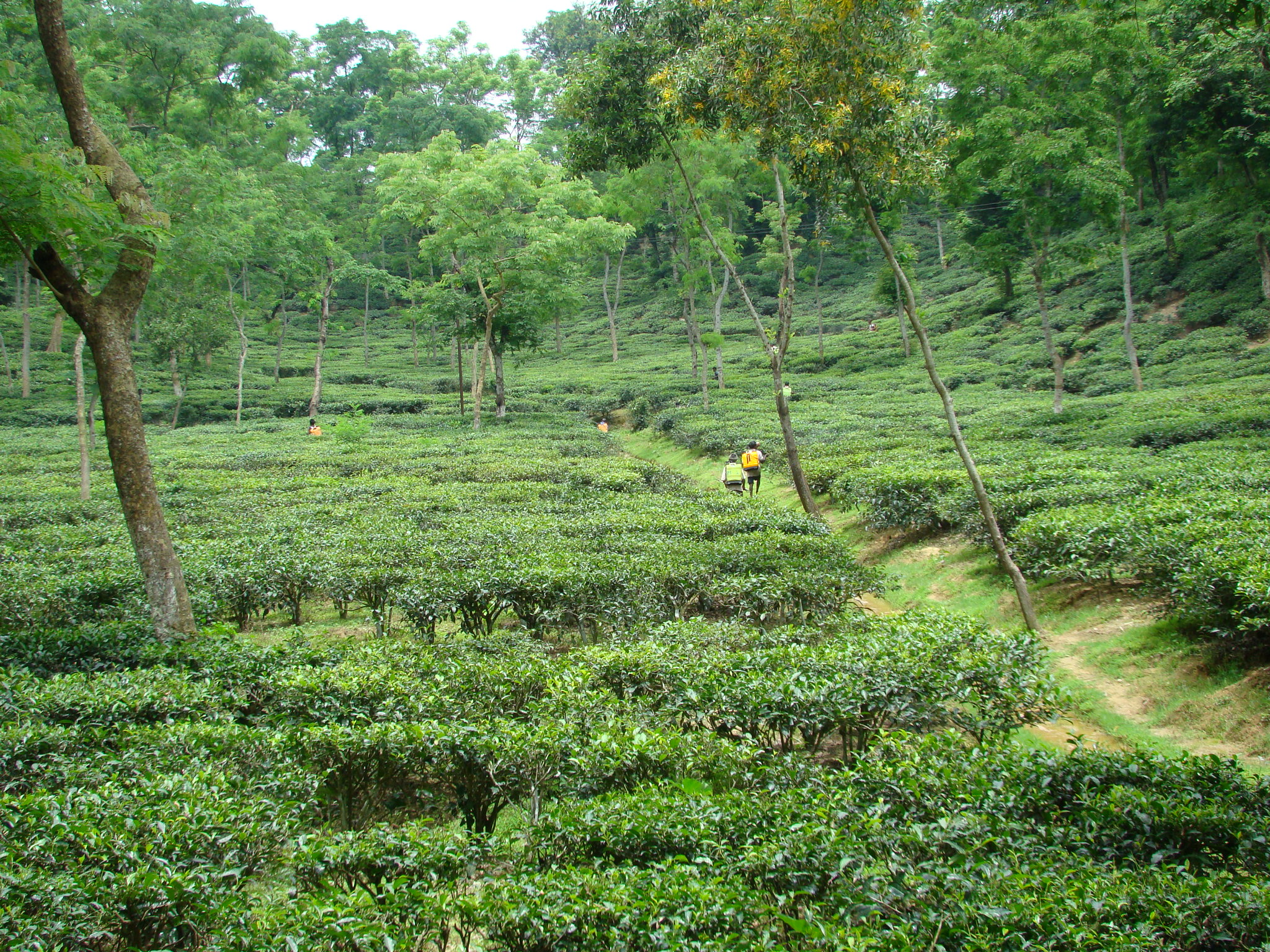
Mulnicherra, now the oldest tea garden in South Asia, is home to the Harong Hurong cave which Garuda supposedly retreated to.

Garuda was born in the Gour royal palace to Raja Govardhan and Apurna. He was to next-in-line to rule over the Gour Kingdom. Garuda was just a baby in 1260 AD, when a battle took place between Govardhan and the tribal rebels consisting of the Nagas, Kukis, Pnars, Khasis and Kacharis. Govardhan was killed in this battle. Shortly after, on the way back from Kamrup, an army of sannyasis led by Govinda, of the Brahmachal (Southern Sylhet) royal family, emerged. This army was able to fight off the rebels and take the throne. Govinda, who was a cousin of Garuda, declared himself the king of Gour, and taking the name Gour Govinda. Garuda's mother, Apurna, thanked the sannyasis and pleaded to allow baby Garuda to survive as a minor.

== Migration ==
The Islamic Conquest of Sylhet in 1303 led to the dethroning of his cousin, Raja Gour Govinda. The royal family escaped to Harong Hurong cave in Mulnicherra before heading off to the shrine of Grivakali. Garuda, his wife Shantipriya and mother Apurna remained in the care of Grivakali's priest while Govinda headed with his family to Kamrup.

Garuda then decided that they head off to Tungachal, a protectorate of Gour governed by Raja Achak Narayan. However, they were seen by Subid, a tribal rebel, who informed the Muslims and this led to Garuda's boat being followed by the Muslims. Out of embarrassment, Garuda committed suicide, jumping off the boat at Puni beel. The boatmen, however, continued taking Apurna and Shantipriya to Tungachal, eventually finding refuge with Raja Achak Narayan. They made a vrata (vow) in Tunganath Shiva temple to fast for ninety days, hoping for safety. Shantipriya committed suicide shortly after.

== Personal life ==
Garuda grew up in the royal palace, never taking the throne but enjoyed remaining a part of Govinda's royal family. He had good relations with Raja Pratap Singh of the Pratapgarh Kingdom. Singh gave his daughter, Princess Shantipriya, in marriage to Garuda and gifted Garuda the area now known as Chapghat in eastern Karimganj as a dowry.

== See also ==
- Sylhet region
- History of Sylhet
