= Gour Govinda =

King of Sylhet from 1260 to 1303

- Raja of Gour Kingdom
- Reign: 1260–1303
- Predecessor: Raja Govardhan
- Successor: Wazir Sikandar Khan Ghazi (under Sultan Shamsuddin Firoz Shah)
- Born: Govinda Fenchu; 13th century Brahmachal kingdom (southern Sylhet)
- Died: 14th century Kamrup region
- Wife: Hiravati Narayan
- Issue: Nirvana Govinda
Temple name
- Hattanath Temple
- Mother: Annapurna Jaintia
- Religion: Hinduism

Gour Govinda was the final Kamrupi Hindu king from Jaintia ethinicity of medieval Sylhet's Gour Kingdom. He is described as a very conservative Hindu ruler whose reign started in 1260. Govinda was known to be disrespectful and intolerant of other faiths practised in Shylet, such as Islam, Buddhism and certain Hindu denominations, often getting into war with neighbouring states such as Laur, Jaintia and the Khasis. However, he is also noted as one of the strongest rulers of medieval Sylhet, and during his reign, Gour was described to be "free of enemies" due to other states fearing Govinda. After the arrival of Shah Jalal and the Conquest of Sylhet in 1303, Govinda left Gour and the area came under the rule of Wazir Sikandar Khan Ghazi.

== Background and early life ==
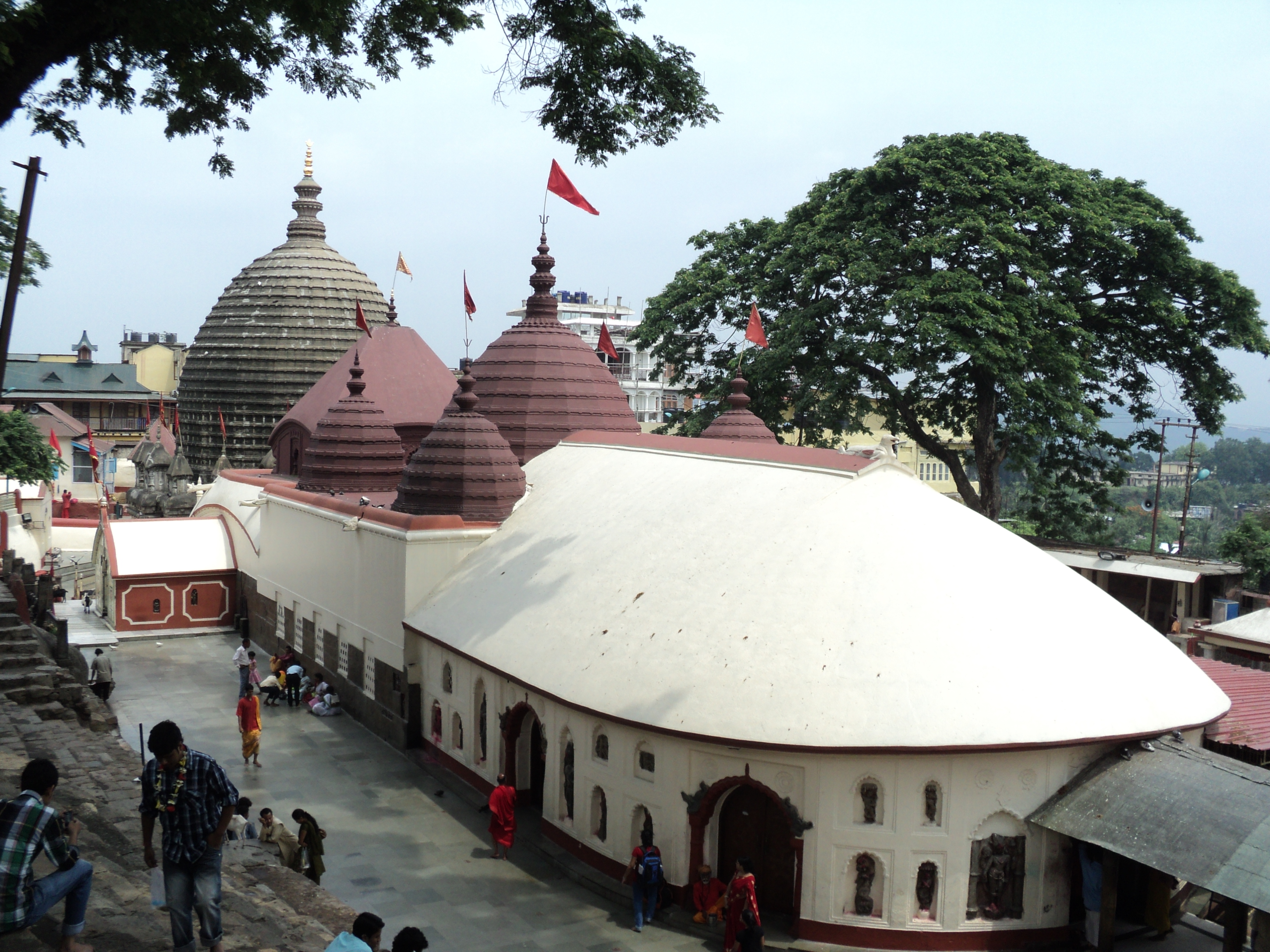
Govinda spent a large proportion of his childhood in Kamakhya Temple and the Kamrup region as a whole, where he was given religious, military and magical education.

Govinda was educated in Kamakhya and given military training in the Kulsia ashram on the banks of the Kulsi River (in modern-day Sualkuchi or Kulsi Reserve Forest) for the next twelve years of his life. He learnt a number of skills which he would use during his reign against his enemies such as archery and magic. He studied alongside Hiravati and Achak Narayan, the orphaned children of a dead Jalpaiguri chief and his captive wife, brought to Kamrup by their nurse Mandavi and her son Jhantu. In 1250, Govardhan would successfully defeat Upananda, thus gaining control of Northern and Southern Sylhet.

== Reign ==
After successfully completing his education, Govinda and his twelve associates were guided by Giridhari back to Sylhet, through Puni beel, in 1260. During this time, Raja Govardhan, the king of Gour, was killed by rebels. Govinda and his accompanying sannyasis went to the temple of Hattanath (tutelary deity of Gour) before launching a surprise attack on the rebels causing them to retreat. Govardhan's wife, Apurna, then thanked the sannyasis and consented for them to rule over Gour as her son, Garuda, who was meant to be Govardhan's heir, was still a minor. Giridhari then informed the royal officers of Govinda's royal lineage, gaining their acceptance, to make his way to the throne. He then changed his name from Govinda Fenchu to Gour Govinda, after his kingdom which he had earned. Govinda appointed Mona Rai as his chief minister, replacing Govardhan's former chief minister Madan Rai.

Govinda then married his childhood friend, Hiravati. In one occasion, Hiravati suffered from an illness and no one in Srihatta could help in curing her. Govinda then travelled to Rarh where he met up with a healer by the name of Chakrapani Dutta. The two men then went back to Gour and Dutta was able to cure Hiravati. Govinda, in delight, requested Dutta to live and spend the rest of his life in the Gour Kingdom. However Dutta wanted to return to Rarh. Not wanting to displease Govinda, Dutta gave his youngest son, Mahipati, to live in the kingdom. Dutta stayed for a while in Gour as Govinda's commander-in-chief. The descendants of Mahipati are now known as the Duttas of Lakhai.

Govinda also made peace with King Ratan Manikya of Tripura, by gifting an elephant. He did this as a plea for the King to return Brahmachal (Southern Sylhet) back to him from the feudal governor Jaidev Rai, to which the King accepted. After the marriage of Achak Narayan to the eight-year-old princess Lalasa, Govinda gifted Narayan by appointing him as the feudal ruler of Tungachal (modern-day Habiganj District). He built forts all over his kingdom and established many military training camps with Takerghat as his naval headquarters. He is famously known to have built a seven-storey brick tower in Penchagor which acted as his palace. The ground floor was given to his army, the first to the commander-in-chief Chakrapani Datta, the second to Mona Rai, the third to the cabinet, and the rest for himself. The palace which was used by the past chief ministers of Gour was given by Govinda to Mona Rai. The new palace in Penchagor, named Gorduar, also remains as ruins today in Mazumdari Mahalla, Ambarkhana Bazar. It was known to his people that he practised magic which he had learnt in the mountains of Kamrup which was in close proximity to his temple.

His military strategy and past victories led to him being very arrogant and boastful of his power. It is said that he would fight lions with swords. There were occasions in which he would go into war with the neighbouring petty kingdoms of Srihatta such as Laur and Jaintia. During a war with the Khasis, Govinda tied the Khasi Raja to ropes, bringing him to Gour. Govinda demanded a ransom for the release of the Khasi king which was later paid. Using Puni beel as a battlefield, Govinda was said to have "drowned his challengers". The Gour Kingdom during his reign became so powerful to such an extent that it was described to be "free of enemies". Govinda would carry on the tradition of using stones (shila) to guard the capital; from which the name of Shilhot came into existence.

Govinda's kingdom bordered Bengal to the west which was ruled by the Muslim Balban dynasty. The Muslim rule led to large numbers of Bengali Hindu Refugee to migrate to Gour, which was considered a Hindu stronghold. Govinda encouraged celebrations such as Vishnu-Sankranti, Shiva-Chaturdashi-Mahashtami, Janmashtami and Utthana-Ekadashi, in addition to holding a 45-day celebration in spring. Brahmins from the Deccan migrated to Gour and gained some authority, being favoured by Govinda for their orthodoxism. These elitist Brahmins led a movement against members of other religions in Gour. They favoured the Brahmins of Brahmachal brought over by Brahmajit. The followers of Tantric Buddhism were treated as dalits, or untouchables of the lowest social status. The Brahmins which King Kesava Deva had welcomed from Central India, were looked down upon by the Deccan Brahmins as low-class as well, in addition to the Namasudras, Kaibartas and Dasas who were influenced too much by Tantric Buddhism.

== Defeat ==
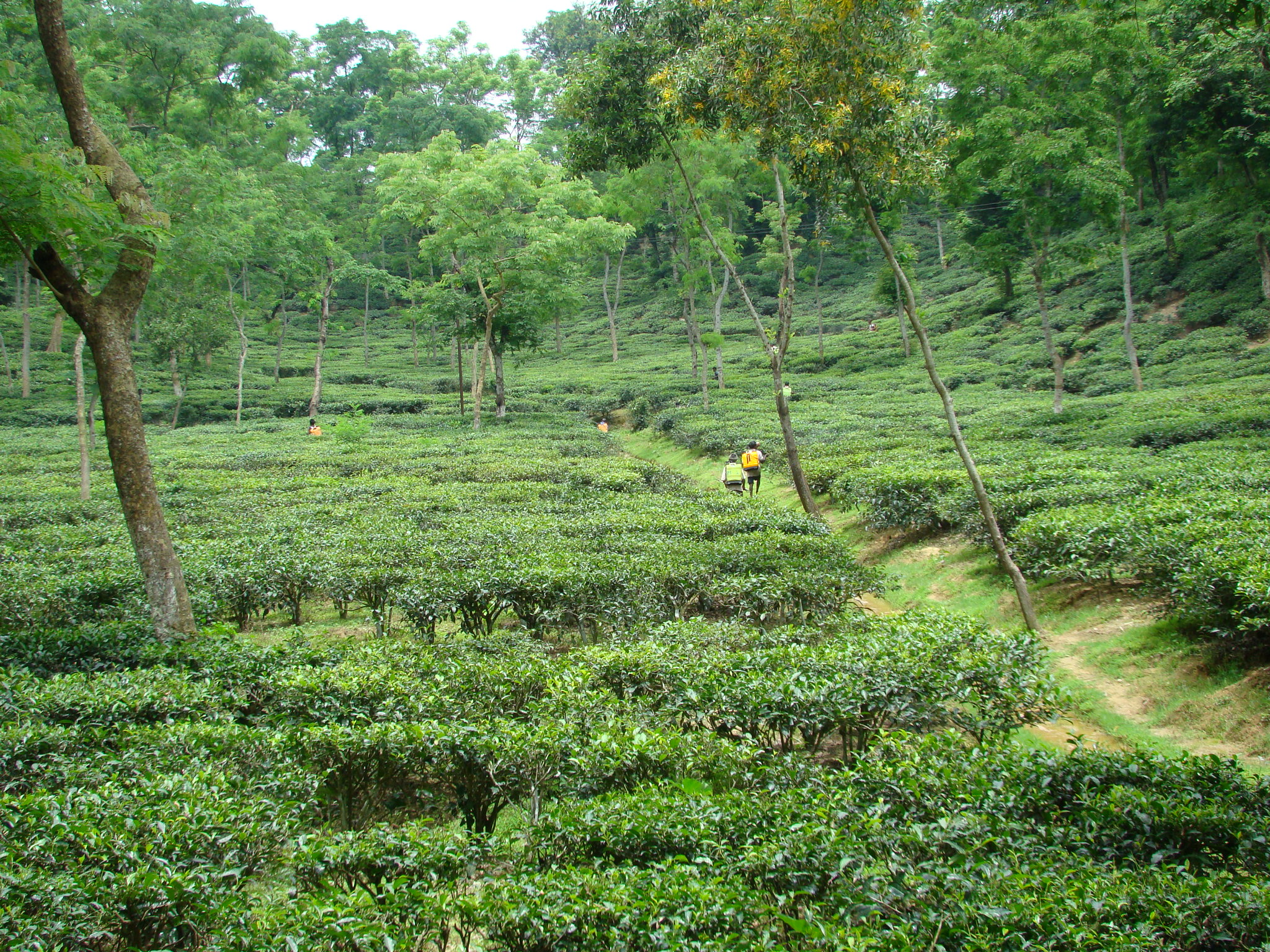
Mulnicherra, now the oldest tea garden in South Asia, is home to the Harong Hurong cave which Govinda supposedly retreated to.

There was also a minority of Muslim families who migrated to Gour and Tungachal, following the short-lived Azmardan Expedition in 1254 led by the Governor of Bengal, Malik Ikhtiyaruddin Iuzbak. Burhanuddin, who lived in the village of Tultikar, sacrificed a cow for his newborn son's aqiqah or celebration of birth. Govinda, in a fury for what he saw as sacrilege due to his Hindu beliefs, had the newborn, Gulzar Alam, killed, as well as having Burhanuddin's right hand cut off. Shortly after this incident, Qazi Nuruddin of Taraf, a rich cultivator, celebrated his son's marriage ceremony by slaughtering a cow for them to eat. After Nuruddin was expelled from the kingdom, Burhanuddin and Nuruddin's brother, Halimuddin, travelled to lower Bengal where they addressed their issued with Sultan Shamsuddin Firoz Shah of Lakhnauti. This initiated the Muslim Conquest of Gour, consisting of two unsuccessful expeditions led by Syed Nasiruddin and Sikandar Khan Ghazi respectively. Govinda's family rejoiced and his aunt Apurna, the queen-mother and wife of the deceased Raja Govardhan, celebrated building a large 20-acre water tank in Bara Bazar, Ambarkhana which was known as Rajar Mar Dighi.

Govinda's defeat was in the third battle by the joint force of Sultan's commander-in-chief Sikandar Khan Ghazi's army as well as Shah Jalal and his companions. After hearing that his commander Mona Rai was killed, he escaped with his family to Harong Hurong cave in Mulnicherra. He then went to the shrine of Grivakali, where he left his aunt, Apurna, and his cousin Garuda and cousin-in-law Shanti in the care of the priest. Following this, he took his wife, Hiravati, and son, Nirvana, with him to Kamarupa Assam.

Preceded by Raja Govardhan	Raja of Gour; 1260-1303	Succeeded by Sikandar Khan Ghazi (under Shamsuddin Firoz Shah)
Preceded by Jaidev Rai	Ruler of Brahmachal; 1260-1303	Succeeded by Shamsuddin Firoz Shah

== See also ==
- Sylhetis
- List of people from Sylhet
