= Ghazi Burhanuddin =

Sufi saint in Bengal (c. 14th century)

Shaykh Ghazi Burhanuddin
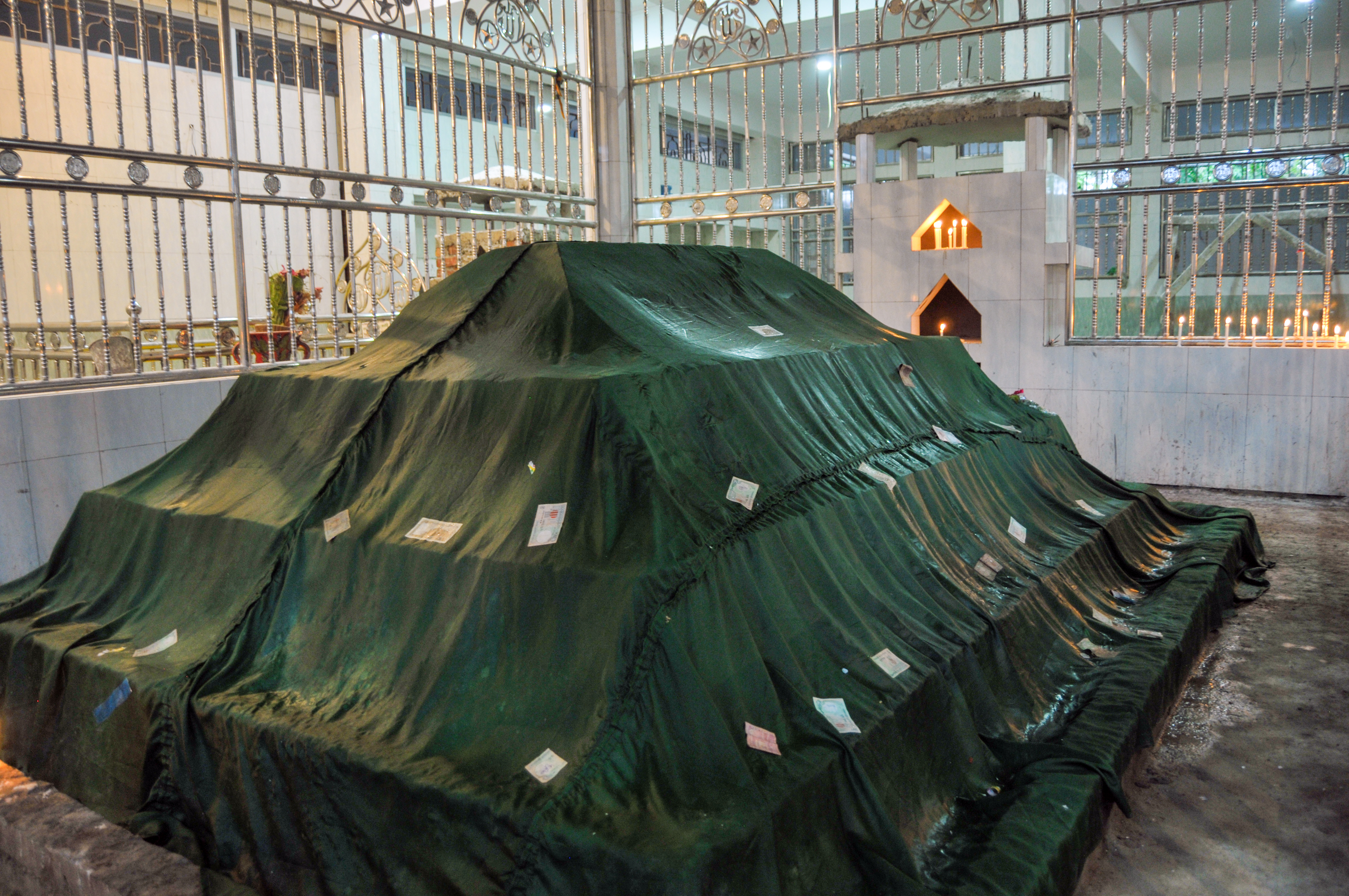
- The tomb of Gazi Burhan Uddin.

Personal life
- Died: Tultikar, Sylhet
- Children: Syed Gulzar Alam

Religious life
- Religion: Islam

Muslim leader
- Based in: Burhanabad, Kushi Ghat, Tultikar, Sylhet
- Post: Companion of Shah Jalal
- Period in office: Early 14th century

Syed Ghāzī Burhān ad-Dīn (Arabic: سيد غازي برهان الدين, Bengali: সৈয়দ গাজী বুরহানউদ্দীন) was a 14th-century Sufi Muslim figure living in Sylhet. He is celebrated in folklore as the first Muslim to live in the Sylhet region.

== Life ==
It is said that there were around 13 Muslim families which settled in the mahalla of Tultikar with Burhanuddin being the chief of this minority group. The ancestors of these thirteen families entered the subcontinent after Muhammad bin Qasim's early 8th century conquest of Sindh and travelled to Chittagong via ship. From there, they eventually reached Sylhet for dawah and business-related purposes. The village which the thirteen families settled in still exists today in Tultikar and is known as Tero Ratan village (তেররতন thirteen pearls).

During the celebration of his newborn son's aqiqah, Burhanuddin decided to sacrifice a cow. Gour Govinda, the King of Sylhet, was angered for what he saw as sacrilege due to his Hindu beliefs and had the newborn, Gulzar Alam, killed as well as Burhanuddin's right hand cut off. Govinda had a reputation of being intolerant of minority peoples following faiths such as Islam, Buddhism and certain sects of Hinduism. Shortly after this incident, Qazi Nuruddin of Taraf celebrated his son's marriage ceremony of his son by slaughtering a cow for them to eat and was also punished by Taraf's feudal ruler, Achak Narayan. After both men being punished, Burhanuddin and Nuruddin's brother, Helimuddin, travelled to North Bengal where they addressed their issues with Sultan Shamsuddin Firoz Shah.

A number of battles took place in order to conquer Sylhet and fight injustice, with Burhanuddin acting as guide. This expedition came to be known as the Conquest of Sylhet. The region was finally conquered with the help of a force led by Shah Jalal and his companions in 1303.

== Legacy ==
A road in Sylhet is named after him as Sayed Burhanuddin Road in Burhanabad (also named after him), Kushighat, Tultikar. A school called Ghazi Burhan Uddin Primary School can also be found in the road. The road also contains his mazar (mausoleum). The former police station in Commercial Street, London was redeveloped as a housing block in 1987 and named after him as Burhan Uddin House.

== See also ==
- Borhani
