= Kamada =

Kamada (written: 鎌田 lit. "sickle ricefield") is a Japanese surname. Notable people with the surname include:

- Daichi Kamada (鎌田 大地; born 1996), Japanese footballer
- Hiroko Kamada (鎌田 弘子; born 1953), Japanese fencer
- Makoto Kamada (鎌田 誠; born 1950), Japanese sport wrestler
- Michiaki Kamada (鎌田 道章; 1890–1947), Imperial Japanese Navy admiral
- Satoru Kamada (鎌田 悟; born 1984), Japanese motorcycle racer
- Yasuji Kamada (鎌田 彌壽治; 1883–1977), Japanese photographer

== See also ==
- Kamata (disambiguation)
