= Madhabpur Upazila =

Madhabpur মাধবপুর
- Upazila
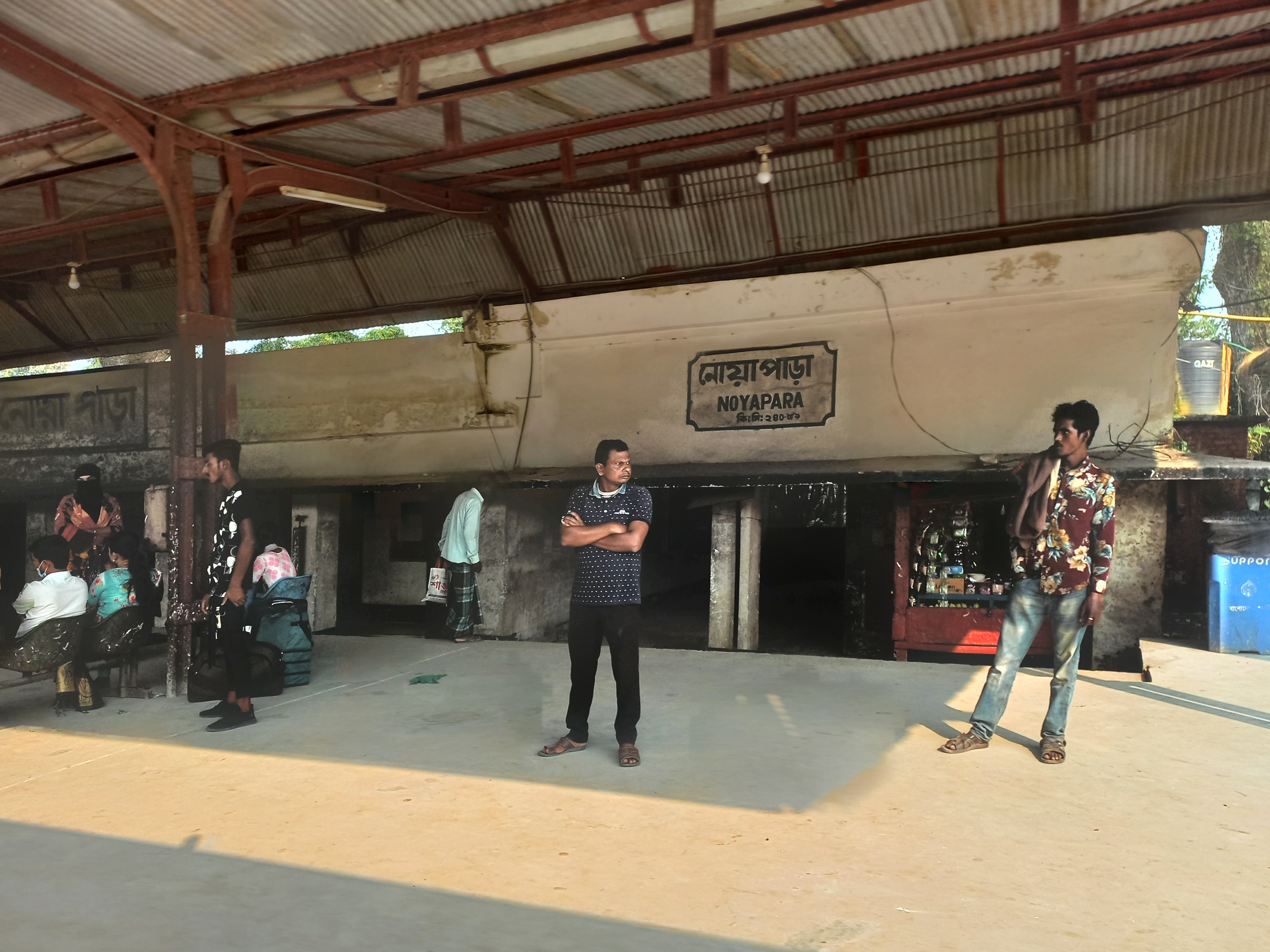
- Nayapara Railway Station, Madhabpur

- Coordinates: 24°6.2′N 91°17.5′E
- Country: Bangladesh
- Division: Sylhet
- District: Habiganj

Area
  - Total: 294.26 km^{2} (113.61 sq mi)

Population (2022)
  - Total: 384,243
  - Density: 1,305.8/km^{2} (3,382.0/sq mi)
- Demonym: Madhabpuri
- Time zone: UTC+6 (BST)
- Postal code: 3330
- Area code: 08327
- Website: Official Map of Madhabpur

Madhabpur Upazila mauza geocode map

Madhabpur (Bengali: মাধবপুর, romanized: Madhôbpur), is an upazila (sub-district) of Habiganj District, located in Bangladesh's Sylhet Division. The upazila is home to Teliapara tea estate

== History ==
Following the Muslim conquest of Taraf in 1304, Fateh Ghazi settled with his nephews in the Raghunandan hills in present-day Madhabpur. He founded the village of Fatehpur, and his dargah (shrine) remains a popular attraction in Madhabpur.

In 1804, a thana (police administrative headquarters) was established in Madhabpur by the British Raj. Later on in the century, the local zamindar Siddheshwari Rai Prasad Chaudhury established a haat bazaar in Madhabpur on the banks of the Sonai River. After 1947, the first CO Office was established in the village of Itakhola in Noapara Union at the house of Rashid Majumdar. It was moved from there to its present location in 1966.

On 4 April 1971, during Bangladesh Liberation War the senior army officers assembled at the headquarters of 2nd East Bengal at Teliapara under Madhabpur Thana, a semi hilly area covered by tea gardens where General MAG Osmani, Lieutenant Colonel Mohammad Abdur Rab, Lieutenant Colonel Salahuddin Mohammad Reja, Major Kazi Nuruzzaman, Major Khaled Mosharraf, Major Nurul Islam, Major Shafaat Jamil, Major Mainul Hossain Chowdhury and others were present. In this meeting four senior commanders were entrusted with the responsibility of operational areas. Sylhet-Brahmanbaria area was placed under the command of Major K. M. Shafiullah, Comilla-Noakhali area was given to Major Khaled Mosharraf while Chittagong-Chittagong Hill Tracts was given to Major Ziaur Rahman and Kushtia-Jessore area was placed under command of Major Abu Osman Chowdhury. In the meeting the organisation concept of the freedom fighter forces and the command structure were chalked out under the command of General MAG Osmani.

== Geography ==
Madhabpur is located at 24.1028°N 91.2917°E. It has 62,300 households and total area 294.26 km^{2} (114 sq mi).

== Demographics ==
Religions in Madhabpur Upazila (2022)
Religion	Percent
Islam	82.32%
Hinduism	17.33%
Other or not stated	0.35%

According to the 2022 Bangladeshi census, Madhabpur Upazila had 84,327 households and a population of 384,243. 11.37% of the population were under 5 years of age. Madhabpur had a literacy rate (age 7 and over) of 68.93%: 70.39% for males and 67.56% for females, and a sex ratio of 94.96 males for every 100 females. 41,487 (10.80%) lived in urban areas. Ethnic population is 8572 (2.23%) of which Munda were 2384 and Santal 2109.

According to the 2011 Census of Bangladesh, Madhabpur Upazila had 62,300 households and a population of 319,016. 89,950 (28.20%) were under 10 years of age. Madhabpur had a literacy rate (age 7 and over) of 39.76%, compared to the national average of 51.8%, and a sex ratio of 1047 females per 1000 males. 24,415 (7.65%) lived in urban areas. Ethnic population was 15,898 (4.98%), of which Santal were 2,315 and Munda 2,275.

As of the 1991 Bangladesh census, Madhabpur has a population of 250069. Males constitute 50.72% of the population, and females 49.28%. This Upazila's eighteen up population is 122903. Madhabpur has an average literacy rate of 23.9% (7+ years), and the national average of 32.4% literate.

=== Education ===
Madhabpur has eight total madrasas including Harashpur Darul Uloom Islamia Madrasa and Darus Sunnah Madrasa Mantala. The three Qawmi madrasa of Madhabpur are: Kharki Islamia Qasimul Uloom (est. 1896, Sharifuddin), Al-Jamiatul Islamia Ashraful Uloom Maujpur (2004, Maniruzzaman) and Khadijatul Kubra Women's Madrasa Maujpur (2012, Ali Husain).

== Administration ==
Madhabpur Upazila is divided into Madhabpur Municipality and 11 union parishad: Adaoir, Andiura, Bagashura, Bahra, Bulla, Chhatiain, Choumohani, Dharmaghar, Jagadishpur, Noapara, and Shahjahanpur. The union parishads are subdivided into 181 mauzas and 267 villages.

Madhabpur Municipality is subdivided into 9 wards and 12 mahallas.

Upazila Nirbahi Officer (UNO): Tasnuva Nashtaran

== Notable people ==
- Fateh Ghazi, Sufi saint and soldier
- Md. Mahbub Ali, politician
- Mohammed Farashuddin, 7th Governor of Bangladesh Bank

== See also ==
- Upazilas of Bangladesh
- Districts of Bangladesh
- Divisions of Bangladesh
