= Kamta =

Kamta may be:

== People ==
- Kamta Prasad (politician), Indian politician
- Kamta Prasad (economist), Indian economist, author and professor
- Kamta Prasad Guru, Indian linguist
- Kamta Prasad Khatik, Indian politician
- Kamta Singh, Indian politician

== Others ==
- Kamta or Kamtapuri, another name for the Rangpuri language, Indo-Aryan language spoken in northeastern India
- Kamtapur, autonomous administrative division in Assam, India
  - Kamatapur Autonomous Council, autonomous administrative region in Assam, India
- Kamata Kingdom, medieval kingdom in Assam and nearby areas
- Kamta-Rajaula State, former princely state in central India
- Chitrakoot, an ancient city in Uttar Pradesh, India, also known as Kamta

== See also ==
- Kamata (disambiguation)
