= Kamata =

Kamata can refer to:

== Places ==
- Kamata, Tokyo, a neighborhood in Ōta, Tokyo, Japan
  - Kamata High School, a school located in the Kamata neighborhood, Ōta, Tokyo, Japan
- Kamata Kingdom, a 13th-century kingdom in Assam, India
- Kamtapur, autonomous administrative division in Assam, India
  - Kamatapur Autonomous Council, autonomous administrative region in Assam, India
- Kamata, New Zealand, a locality in Grey District, New Zealand

== People with the surname ==
- Jiro Kamata (born 1985), Japanese footballer
- Mitsuo Kamata (born 1937), Japanese footballer
- Pedro Kamata (born 1981), Angolan-born Congolese-French footballer
- Shoji Kamata (鎌田 正司, born 1935), Japanese basketball player
- Shoma Kamata (born 1989), Japanese footballer
- Tor Kamata (1937–2007), American-Canadian wrestler
- Yoshinao Kamata (born 1993), Japanese professional baseball pitcher

== Train stations ==
- Kamata Station (Tokyo), an interchange train station located in Ōta in Tokyo, Japan, served by the Keihin-Tōhoku Line, Tōkyū Tamagawa Line, and Tōkyū Ikegami Line
- Keikyū Kamata Station, a railway station located in Ōta in Tokyo, Japan, operated by Keihin Electric Express Railway (Keikyū)
- Kamata Station (Ehime), a train station located in Ehime Prefecture, Shikoku, Japan, served by the Iyo Railway Gunchu Line

== See also ==
- Kamta (disambiguation)
- Kamada
