= Kamta Singh =

Indian politician

Member of Parliament, Rajya Sabha
- In office 1958-1964
- Constituency: Bihar

Personal details
- Born: 1916
- Party: Swatantra Party
- Spouse: Indumati Devi
- Children: 6

Kamta Singh was an Indian politician. He was born in Bihar. He was a Member of Parliament, representing Bihar in the Rajya Sabha the upper house of India's Parliament as a member of the Swatantra Party.
