= Malnicherra Tea Estate =

Tea garden in Bangladesh

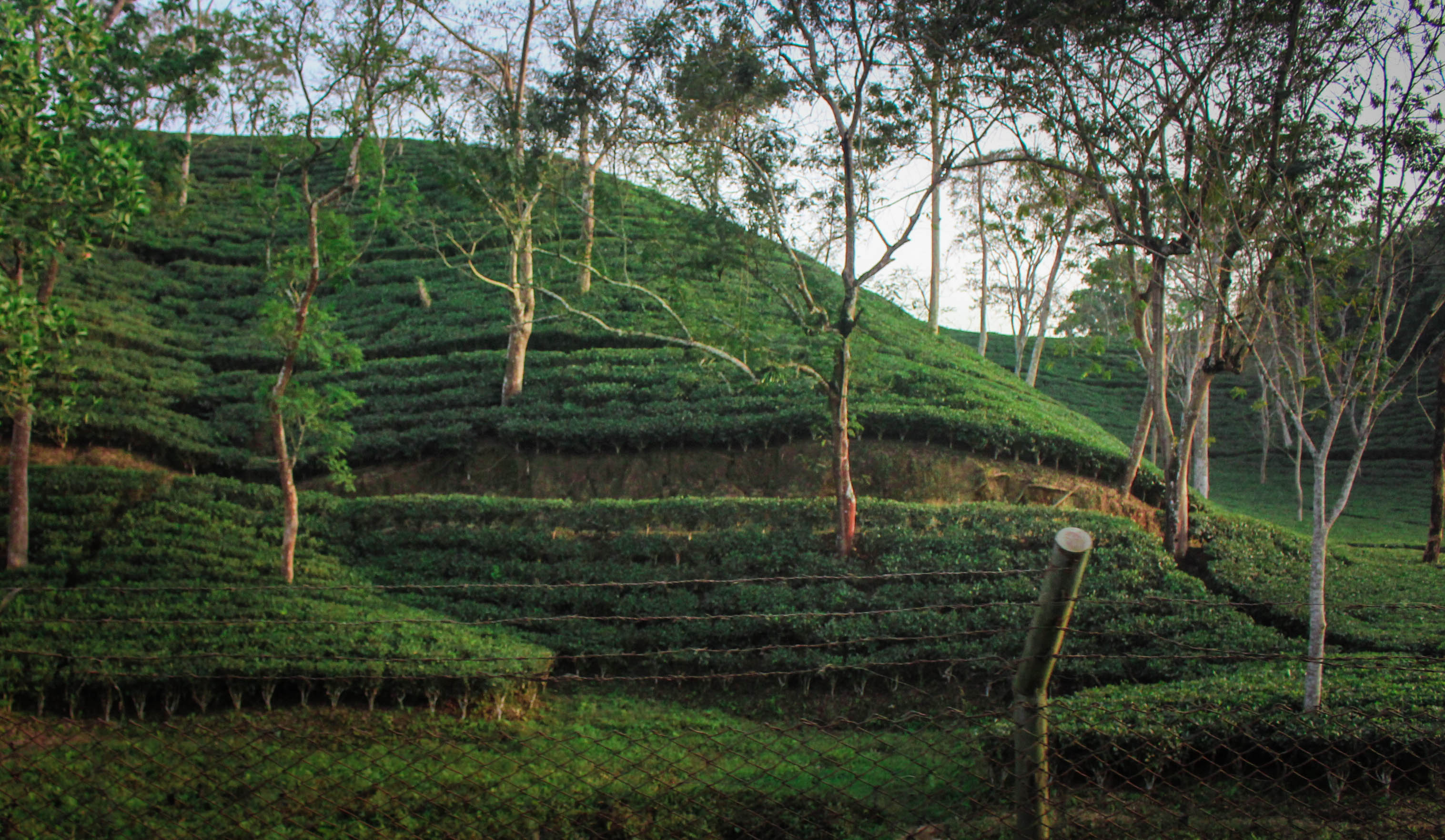
- Malnicherra Tea Estate - Sylhet - Bangladesh.
- Interactive map of Malnicherra Tea Estate
- Type: private
- Location: Sylhet, Bangladesh
- Area: 1,500 acres (610 ha)
- Opened: 1849; 177 years ago

Malnicherra Tea Estate (also known as Malnichhera Tea Garden) is a tea garden located in Sylhet district of Bangladesh. It is the oldest tea garden in South Asia. Malnichhera Tea Garden is not only the largest and first established tea garden in Bangladesh, but also in the subcontinent. It was established by Lord Hurdson in 1849 on 1500 acres of land. The tea garden is located a short distance from Sylhet International Airport. Harong Hurong, an ancient cave, is situated in the remote area of Malnicherra.

== History ==
In 1650, the first tea production began in China. Drinking tea was one of the seven tasks of the daily life of the intellectuals of the country. About 200 years later, in 1849, the first tea production started in the subcontinent in Sylhet. The British and Bangladeshis became accustomed to tea. Tea cultivation in the subcontinent originated from the Malnicherra tea garden in Sylhet. Malnicherra has been operated by many English, Pakistani and Bangladeshi merchants and has been privately owned since 1988. When former US Ambassador Harry K. Thomas passed through the garden path, he said that the world is so beautiful that it is impossible to understand without seeing the Malnichhera garden. Thousands of national and international tourists visit the tea garden every day.

== See more ==
- Tea production in Bangladesh
