= Syed Nasiruddin =

Bengali Sufi saint and military leader

Syed Shah Nasiruddin
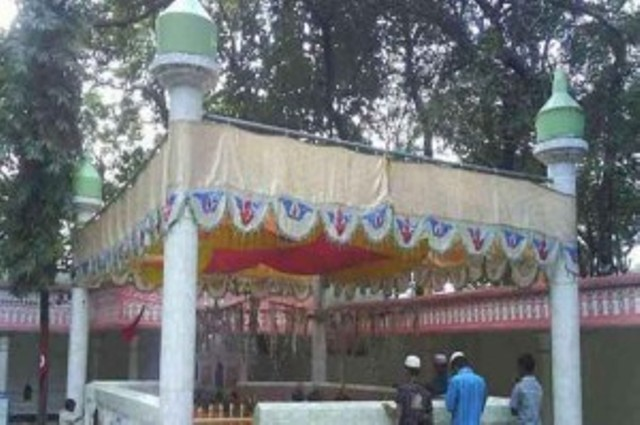
- The shrine of Syed Nasiruddin in Taraf, Greater Sylhet

Personal life
- Born: Baghdad
- Died: Murarband (present-day Chunarughat, Habiganj, Bangladesh)
- Resting place: Murarband Darbar Sharif, Habiganj
- Children: Syed Shah Sirajuddin
- Parent: Hasan al-Arabi (father)
- Other name: Nasir Uddin

Religious life
- Religion: Islam
- School: Suhrawardiyya

Muslim leader
- Based in: Taraf
- Post: Sipah Salar
- Period in office: Early 14th century

Syed Shah Nasiruddin (Bengali: শাহ সৈয়দ নাসিরুদ্দীন, Arabic: شاه سيد ناصر الدين) was a Sufi saint and military leader associated with the spread of Islam in Bengal in the 14th century. As the commander of the armed forces (Sipah Salar) of Sultan Shamsuddin Firoz Shah, Syed Nasiruddin is primarily known for his role in the Conquest of Sylhet in 1303, alongside the celebrated Sufi dervish Shah Jalal.

== Birth and lineage ==
Nasiruddin was born into a Syed family in Baghdad, the son of Hasan al-Arabi (Hasan the Arab). Historian Achyut Charan Choudhury traces Nasiruddin's descent from the Twelve Imams of Shia Islam, saying his lineage was:

Syed Nasiruddin, Siphah Salar son of Hasan Arabi son of Khwaja Daud son of Khwaja Abul Fazal son of Khwaja Abul Farah son of Muhammad al-Mahdi son of Hasan al-Askari son of Ali an-Naqi son of Muhammad al-Taqi son of Ali al-Ridha son of Musa al-Kadhim son of Ja'far al-Sadiq son of Muhammad al-Baqir son of Zayn al-Abidin son of Hazrat Husayn son of Hazrat Ali.

== Life ==
=== Conquest of Sylhet ===
After being forced to leave the city in 1258 following its destruction by the Mongols under Hulagu Khan, Syed Nasiruddin first moved to Delhi before settling in Bengal. At some point, he became a follower of the Suhrawardiyya Sufi Order and a number of supernatural abilities were attributed to him. It is perhaps through these stories of spiritual powers that he gained the patronage of the Sultan of Bengal, Shamsuddin Firoz Shah.

By 1303, Syed Nasiruddin had become the Sipah Salar of the Sultan's army. During this time, Firoz Shah was involved in a war with the Hindu king of Sylhet, Gour Govinda. Two unsuccessful attacks against Govinda had already been attempted by the Sultan's army, led by his nephew Sikander Khan. A third strike, now also under the leadership of Syed Nasiruddin was ordered. This army was later joined by the forces of Shah Jalal and his 360 followers. This attack ultimately proved successful and Gour Govinda was forced to retreat, thereby bringing Sylhet under Muslim control.

=== Capture of Taraf ===
Soon after the conquest of Sylhet, word was received of the execution of a local Qadi by Achak Narayan, the ruler of the neighbouring kingdom of Taraf in present-day Habiganj. This was done in response to the Qadi, who was called Nuruddin, sacrificing a cow in celebration of his son's marriage, an action which offended the king.

Syed Nasiruddin was dispatched with a contingent of soldiers as well as twelve of Shah Jalal's followers against Narayan, who fled with his family upon learning of the advance. Taraf was easily captured as a result, with Nasiruddin being subsequently appointed as its governor. He then attempted to console the family of the late Qadi by giving his own son, Syed Sirajuddin, in marriage to Nuruddin's daughter.

=== Legacy ===
Nasiruddin was buried in Murarband, Taraf, and his grave later became a shrine (mazar). His family continued as hereditary rulers of the area.

== See also ==
- Syed Ibrahim Danishmand
