= Harong Hurong =

Name of an ancient cave in Bangladesh

Harong Hurong Cave
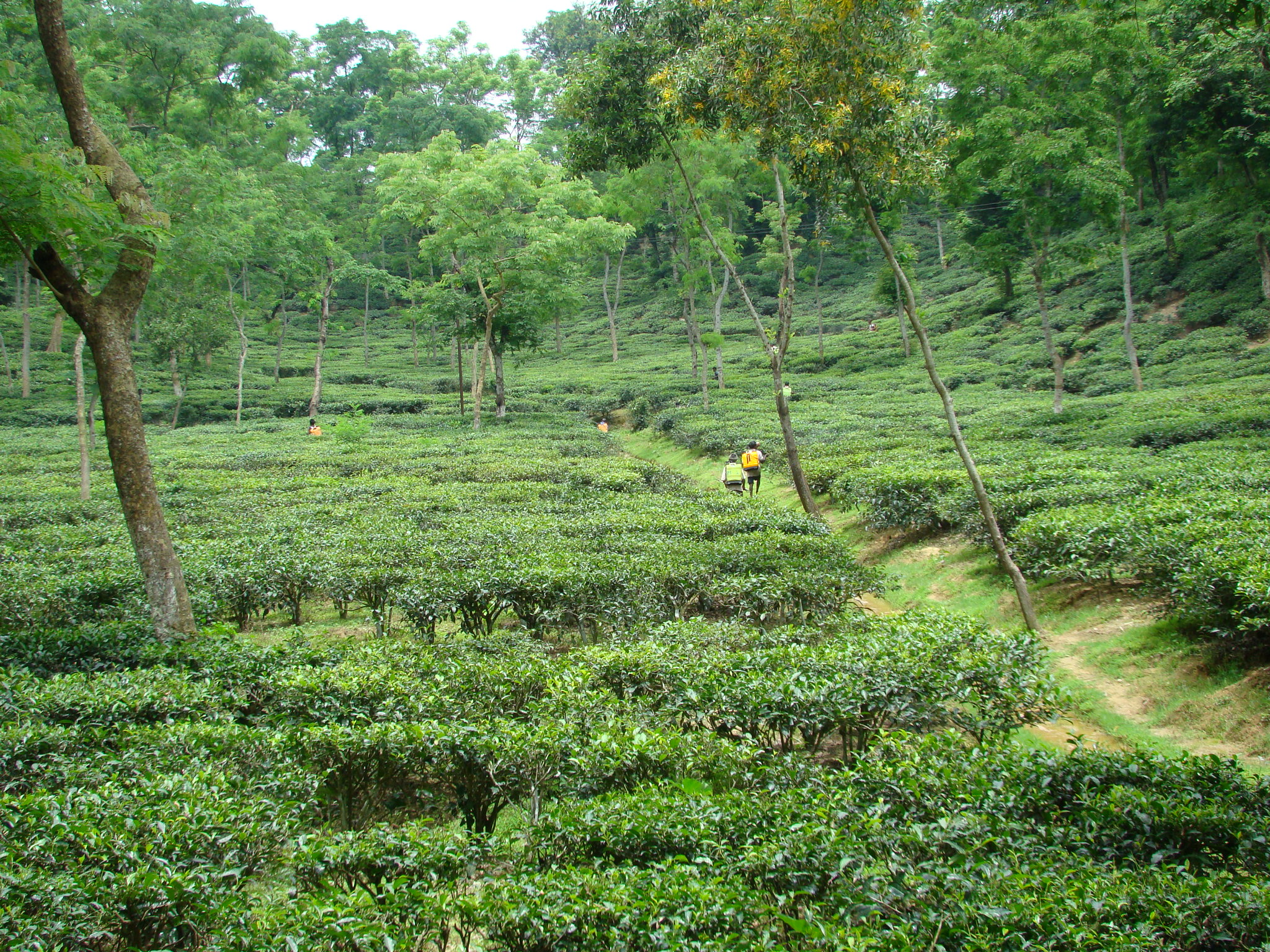
- Mulnicherra, now the oldest tea garden in South Asia, is home to the Harong Hurong cave to which Govinda supposedly retreated.
- Location: Sylhet District, Bangladesh

Harong Hurong (Bengali: হারং হুরং) is the name of an ancient cave in the Sylhet region of Bangladesh. In Sylheti 'harong' means narrow or alternative route and 'hurang' means 'tunnel'. There is a legend that, in 1303 when the king of Gour Govinda heard the news of Shah Jalal's arrival in the region he and his army fled through the tunnel and disappeared forever.

== Etymology ==
Hurong (হুরং) is the Sylheti dialectical form of the word (Bengali: সুড়ঙ্গ, romanized: shurongo literally meaning tunnel), and is used to mean (Bengali: সাঁকো, romanized: Sanko) the bamboo bridge in many areas of Sylhet and Sunamganj. The tunnel is known by the people of the garden as "Gaur Govind Radha Cave"; where every Saturday and Tuesday they offer worships.

== Location ==
Harong Hurong tunnel is located in the remote area of Malnicherra, the first commercial tea estate in the subcontinent. This tunnel is located south of Telihathi, next to section No-14 of the Hiluachara Tea Garden.

== Myth ==
The tunnel dates back to about seven hundred years or more. As a result, many folk tales and myths are prevalent among the locals. Many people think that the tunnel extends to Jaintia. It is reported that none of the people who entered into the cave came out alive. And even though who has come out, he has died in a short period of time. Three Indian Tantrikas entered here. Only one of them returned and lived very short time. He was abnormal until his death. A wealthy businessman from Sylhet took an initiative to dig it, but he stopped the renovation work in the midst of seeing an unusual dream. An old man of this village entered of his youth. When he sees something supernatural, he comes out with panic. Since then the man is mad, even the famous Kabiraj of Telheti could not cure him.
