= Shamsuddin Firuz Shah =

Sultan of Lakhnauti from 1301 to 1322

- Al-Sultan Al-Azam Shams Al-Duniya wa Al-Din Abu Al-Muzaffar Firuz Shah Al-Sultan
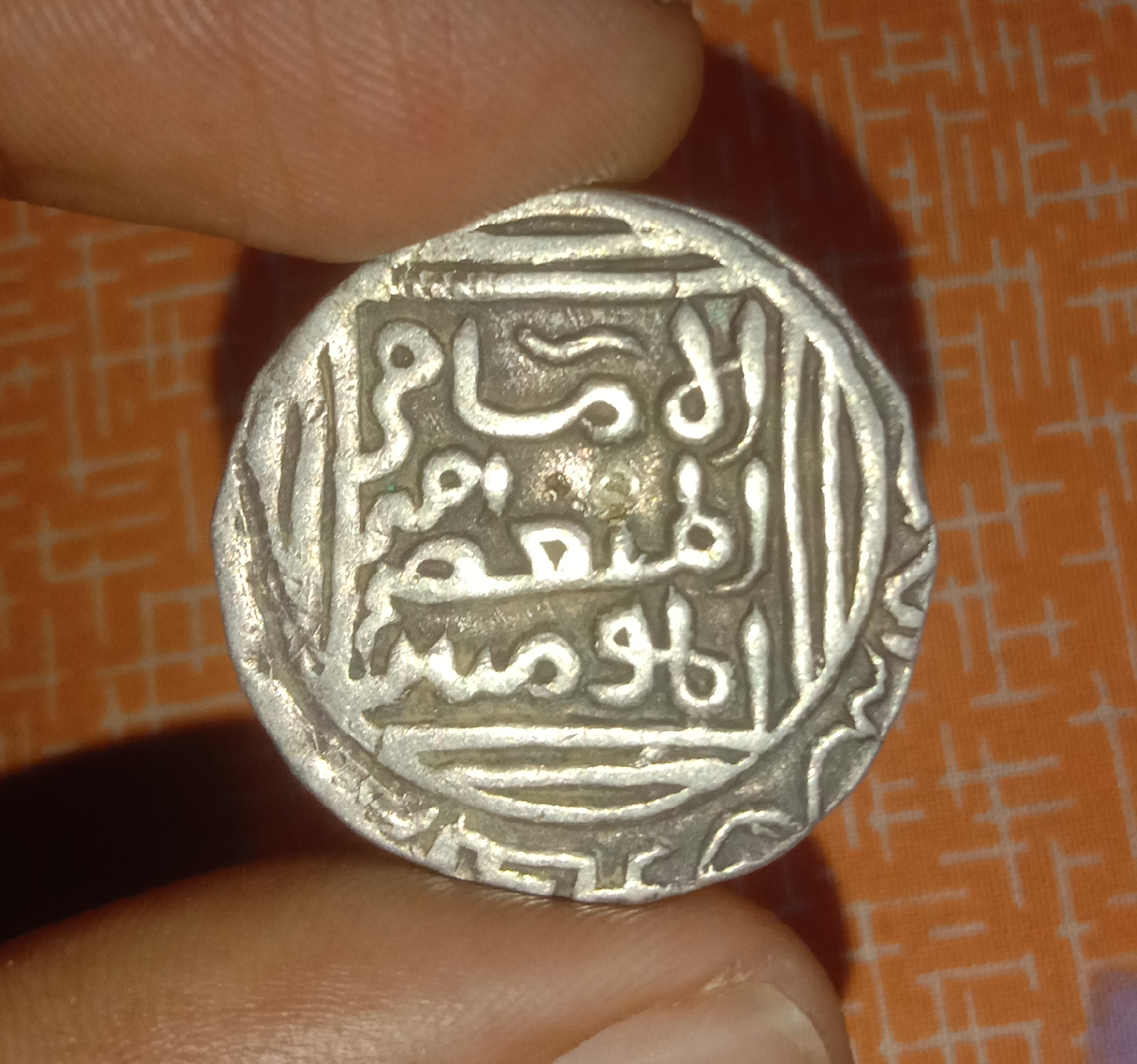
- Silver Tanka of Shamsuddin Firuz Shah, Kingdom of Lakhnauti, AH 716, struck in the royal mint of Khitta Lakhnauti.
- Reign: 1301–1322
- Predecessor: Rukunuddin Kaikaus
- Successor: Ghiyasuddin Bahadur Shah
- Died: 1322
- Issue: Shihabuddin Bughda; Jalaluddin Mahmud; Ghiyasuddin Bahadur Shah; Nasiruddin Ibrahim; Tajuddin Hatim Khan; Qutlu Khan

Shamsuddin Firuz Shah (Persian: شمس الدين فيروز شاه, Bengali: শামসুদ্দীন ফিরুজ শাহ, Shams Ad-Dīn Firūz Shāh; reigned: 1301–1322) was the independent ruler of the Lakhnauti Kingdom. He ascended the throne with the title of Al-Sultan Al-Azam Shams Al-Duniya wa Al-Din Abu Al-Muzaffar Firuz Shah Al-Sultan and invoked the name of the Abbaside Caliph Mustasim Billah in his coins.

== Origin ==
His origin and identity is uncertain. He was once thought, based on the writings of Ibn Battuta, to be the son of Bughra Khan and the grandson of Sultan Ghiyasuddin Balban. This belief was challenged in the 1940s by scholars who showed Ibn Batuta to be unreliable regarding this part of the history of Bengal. They furthermore observed, on a close examination of his coins, that Firuz called himself only "Sultan", not "Sultan bin Sultan" or "Sultan bin Sultan bin Sultan" as would have been customary if he were a descendant of Balban. KR Qanungo postulated that Firuz was one of the two Firuzes left by Sultan Ghiyasuddin Balban to assist his son Bughra Khan, who was appointed to the governorship of Lakhnauti. Historian Abdul Karim, writing in 1958, endorsed that view and concluded based on original and contemporary authorities that Firuz came from Delhi and was appointed secretary to Bughra Khan. Mohammed Akhtaruzzaman concurs that Firuz was "most probably one of the principal bureaucrats in Bughra Khan's administration."

Of the two Firuzes who were advisors of Bughra Khan, Firuz Iitigin, the ruler of Bihar, was more competent. Probably Firuz Iitigin, one of the two Firuzes, after the death of Rukunuddin Kaikaus or displacing him forcibly, came to the throne of Lakhnauti in 1301 CE with the title of Sultan Shamsuddin Firuz Shah. On his accession to the throne, Sultan Shamsuddin Firuz Shah entrusted the governorship of Bihar to Tajuddin Hatim Khan, one of his sons.

== Expansion of kingdom ==
Having consolidated his position, Firuz Shah turned his attention towards the expansion of his kingdom. The Muslim principality of Lakhnauti was limited to Bihar, north and northwest Bengal and up to Lakhnur in southwest Bengal. Rukunuddin Kaikaus had already started the conquest of the eastern part of Bengal, and the task was completed during the time of Firuz Shah. It is said that Kaikaus issued coins for the first time from the Kharaj of Bang. But during the time of Firuz Shah the Sonargaon area (southeast Bengal) was included in the Muslim Kingdom. He built a mint at Sonargaon from where a large number of coins were issued. Similarly, the conquest of Satgaon, begun during the time of Kaikaus under his general Zafar Khan, was completed during the time of Firuz Shah. From an inscription of Firuz, it is learnt that one Zafar Khan built a madrasa called Dar-ul-Khairat in 1313 CE. Very little is known about his conquest of Mymensingh. It is only known that his son Ghiyasuddin Bahadur issued coins from Ghiyaspur mint, identified with a village having the same name, about 24 km from Mymensingh. During the reign of Firuz Shah, his nephew Sikandar Khan Ghazi led a fruitful expedition against Matuk, a Hindu Raja of the Sundarban area. A coin of Sultan Firuz has been discovered in a village in the extreme south of Satkhira District. The most important event of the reign of Firuz Shah was the Conquest of Sylhet. According to an inscription Firuz Shah conquered Sylhet in 1303 CE. The names of the Sufi-saint Shah Jalal and the commander Syed Nasiruddin are associated in connection with the conquest of Sylhet.

Firuz Shah held Bihar firmly against the Khaljis. Two inscriptions of his reign, discovered in Bihar, prove this. Thus during his time, Lakhnauti extended from at least the rivers Son and Ghogra in the west to Sylhet in the east and from Dinajpur-Rangpur in the north to Hughli and the Sundarbans in the south.

== Sharing power ==
Firuz had six grown-up sons - Shihabuddin Bughda, Jalaluddin Mahmud, Ghiyasuddin Bahadur, Nasiruddin Ibrahim, Hatim Khan and Kutlu Khan. Of these six, Tajuddin Hatim Khan was the governor of Bihar. It is evident from numismatic evidence that during the lifetime of Firuz Shah, his sons Jalaluddin Mahmud, Shihabuddin Bughda and Ghiyasuddin Bahadur issued coins in their own names from the Lakhnauti mint. Ghiyasuddin Bahadur also issued coins from the mints of Sonargaon and Ghiyaspur.

A group of scholars, on the basis of these coins, have argued that the sons of Firuz Shah rose in rebellion against their father and alternately ruled Lakhnauti. But the minting of coins by the sons of Firuz Shah was not the result of their rebellion, rather it was the result of their sharing of power with their father. In fact, Firuz Shah ascended the throne of Lakhnauti at quite an advanced age when he was the father of six grown-up sons who helped him in the affairs of the kingdom. Being satisfied with the co-operation of his sons, Firuz Shah allowed his sons to run the administration of some portions of his kingdom independently and to exercise royal authority as in the minting of coins. Had the sons revolted against their father, chaos and confusion would have prevailed and expansion of the kingdom would not have been possible.

== Death ==
Firuz Shah died in 1322 CE while staying at Khulna.

Preceded by Rukunuddin Kaikaus (Balban Dynasty)	Independent Sultan of Bengal; 1301–1322	Succeeded by Ghiyasuddin Bahadur Shah

== See also ==
- List of rulers of Bengal
- History of Bengal
- History of Bangladesh
- History of India
