= Jaintia =

Jaintia may refer to:

- Jaintia people, also known as Synteng or Pnar, a tribe of Meghalaya, India
- Jaintia language, spoken by the Jaintia people
- Jaintia Kingdom, a former kingdom in present-day North-East India
- Jaintia Hills district, a former district in Meghalaya, India
  - East Jaintia Hills district, an administrative district in Meghalaya, India
  - West Jaintia Hills district, an administrative district in Meghalaya, India

== See also ==
- Pnar (disambiguation)
- Jaintiapur Upazila, an administrative division of Bangladesh
- Jaintia Rajbari, residence of Kings of Jaintia Kingdom
