= Dibir Haor =

Tourist attraction in Sylhet District, Bangladesh

- Shapla Beel
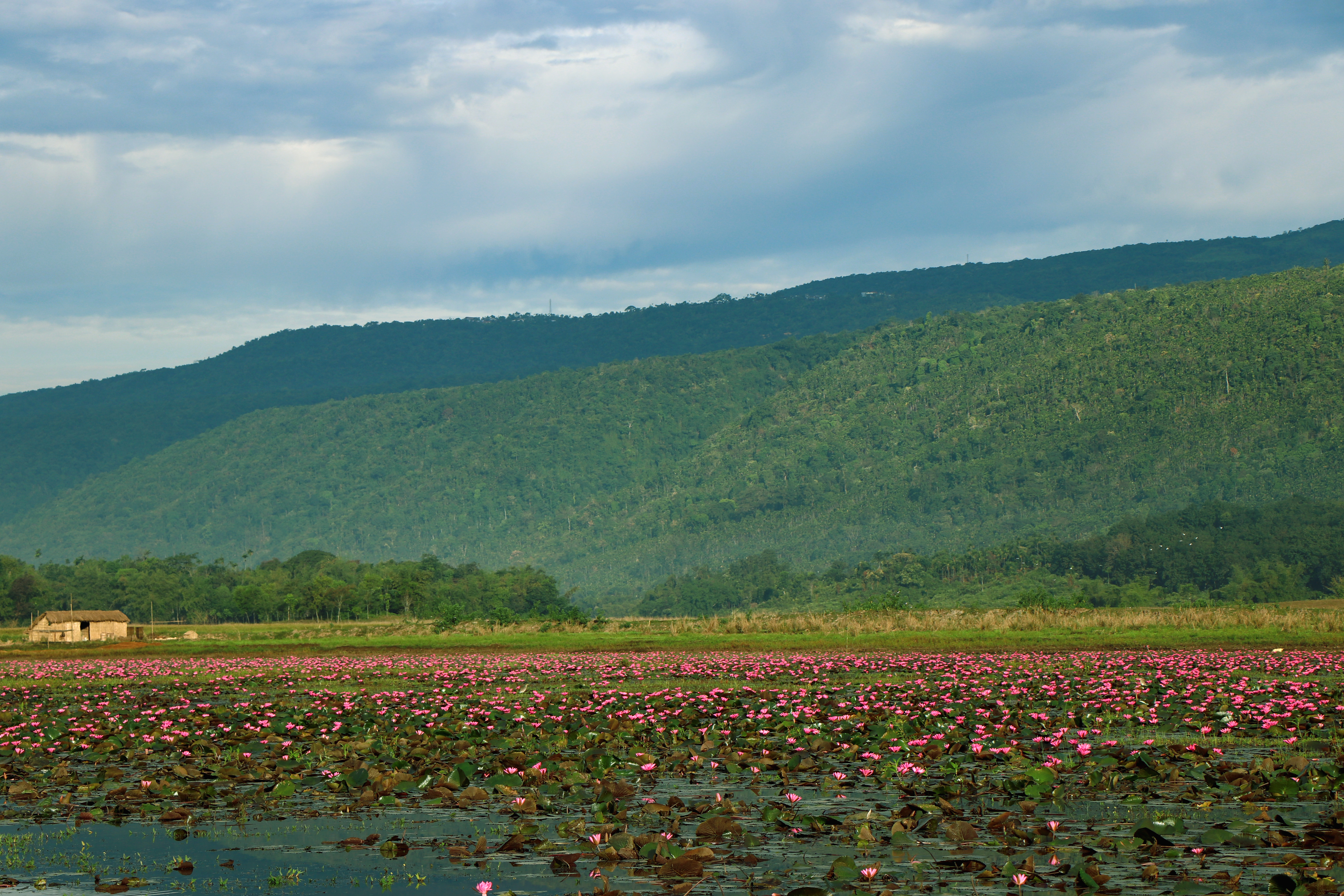
- Location: Jaintiapur Upazila, Sylhet District, Bangladesh
- Coordinates: 25°09′31″N 92°07′16″E
- Primary inflows: foothills of the Meghalaya Hills

Dibir Haor, also known as Shapla Beel (Water Lily Lake), is a prominent wetland and tourist attraction located in Jaintiapur Upazila, Sylhet District, Bangladesh. Situated near the Bangladesh–India border at the foothills of the Meghalaya Hills, Dibir Haor is renowned for its vibrant red water lilies (locally called shapla), which blanket the area during the post-monsoon season, creating a stunning natural spectacle. The haor encompasses four interconnected beels (wetlands): Dibi Beel, Yam Beel, Horofkata Beel, and Kendri Beel, covering a total area of approximately 900 acres (3.64 km²).

== Geography and Location ==
Dibir Haor is located approximately 42–45 kilometers from Sylhet city, near the Jaintapur Upazila, close to the Tamabil road along the Bangladesh-India border. The haor is positioned at the coordinates 25°9'25.650"N, 92°7'18.988"E, nestled at the base of the Meghalaya Hills. The surrounding area is characterized by its proximity to the Khasi and Jaintia Hills, with the Khasia community residing nearby.

The haor is part of a larger ecosystem that supports diverse flora and fauna, particularly during the monsoon and post-monsoon seasons when water levels rise, creating an ideal habitat for aquatic plants and migratory birds.

== History ==
Dibir Haor is historically associated with the Jaintia Kingdom and Raja Ram Singh, a prominent figure in the region's history. Local legend states that one of the kings of the Jaintia Kingdom drowned in the haor, and a now-dilapidated temple, approximately 200 years old, was constructed in his memory at the center of Dibir Haor. This temple, though in ruins, remains a point of interest for visitors.

The red water lilies, which dominate the haor, are said to have been introduced by the Khasia community around 30 years ago for religious purposes. Since then, the lilies have proliferated across the four beels, covering approximately 700 acres and transforming the area into a major tourist destination.

== Ecology and Biodiversity ==
Dibir Haor is a vital ecological zone, particularly known for its red water lilies (Nymphaea spp.), which bloom vibrantly from September to December, with November being the peak season for viewing. The lilies are most striking in the early morning when they are fully bloomed, illuminated by the soft light of dawn.

In addition to its floral beauty, the haor serves as a winter habitat for migratory birds such as Balihans, Patisrali, Pankauri, Sadabak, and Jal Mayuri, which add to the area's ecological significance. The haor also supports various species of domestic fish, contributing to the local ecosystem and economy.
