= Laur kingdom =

Medieval Kingdom in Sylhet (c. 600–1565)

Kingdom of Laur লাউড় রাজ্য
- 600–1565
- Capital: Nabagram (now in Badaghat Union, Tahirpur)
- Common languages: Sanskrit, Prakrit
- Religion: Hinduism
- Demonym: Lauri
- Government: Monarchy
- Historical era: Classical period
  - Established: 600
  - Disestablished: 1565
Preceded by	Succeeded by
Jaintia Kingdom	Mughal Empire
- Today part of: Bangladesh; India

The Laur kingdom was one of the many petty kingdoms of the Sylhet region. Others included the Gour Kingdom, Ita Kingdom, Taraf Kingdom, Pratapgarh Kingdom and Jaintia Kingdom.

== Location ==
It is considered that in the 7th century, the kingdom consisted of the modern-day Sunamganj District as well as parts of Habiganj and Mymensingh.

== History ==
Before the establishment of the Laur Kingdom, the area was a part of Jaintia in the greater Kamarupa Kingdom. When Guhak ascended the Jaintia throne, he married a princess from Kamarupa. Guhak split the Jaintia Kingdom into three for his three sons. He gave his eldest son, Jayantak, the northern hills which remained known as the Jaintia Kingdom. He gave his second son, Gurak, the southern plains which would be named Gour Kingdom, and he gave his third son, Ladduk, the western plains which would become the Laur Kingdom.

In 640, the Raja of Tripura Dharma Fa planned a ceremony and invited five Brahmans from Kannauj. Keshab Misra, a Brahman from Kannauj, migrated to Laur where he established a Hindu kingdom.

In the late thirteenth century, Laur faced a number of attacks from the neighbouring kingdom of Gour ruled by the Hindu king Gour Govinda.

A later Raja of Laur, Ramnath (descendant of Keshab Misra), had three sons with only one remaining in central Laur. Ramnath's second son, Durbar Singh became a Muslim and changed his name to Durbar Khan. Khan migrated to Jagannathpur to build his own palace. He later seized his youngest brother, Gobind Singh's, territory in Baniachong.

After the death of Laur Raja Durbar Khan, his younger brother Gobind Singh took over his land. Durbar Khan's sons then informed the Nawab of Bengal of this incident. Gobind was summoned to Delhi for a short time where he also accepted Islam. He changed his name to Habib Khan. As a reward, he regained Laur in 1566 but as a feudal ruler. Laur lost its independence and became a mahal/mahallah of the Sylhet Sarkar in the Bengal Subah of the Mughal Empire. Habib's grandson was Majlis Alam Khan, the father of Anwar Khan.

A later zamindar of Laur, Abid Reza left Laur to establish Baniachong in the early eighteenth century, which would become the largest village in the world. Many followed Reza to Baniachong after Laur was burnt by the Khasi in 1744. The Nawab of Bengal Alivardi Khan is said to have granted 48 large boats to the Baniachong zamindars. A short while after, Reza built a fort in Laur which remains as ruins today. His son, Umed Reza, excavated much of Baniachong during his zamindari. Both Rezas were feudal under the Amils or Faujdars of Sylhet.

=== British rule ===
With the establishment of the East India Company and later the British Raj, Laur continued to exist merely as a pargana or fiscal division, as well as a thana, within greater Sylhet. Its area was 105.64 square metres, consisted of 305 estates and had a land revenue of £308 as of 1875.

In one incident, hill tribes attacked the Laur thana, killing 20 people including the thanadar. In 1787, the Khasis of Laur also rebelled, plundering many parganas, such as Atgram, Bangsikunda, Ramdiga, Betal and Selharas, and killing up to 800 people. Before the troops of the Collector of Sylhet, Robert Lindsay, could arrive, the Khasis retreated back to their mountains.

== Rulers ==
=== Krishak dynasty ===
1. Ladduk (600-630)
2. Shambhuk (630-660)
3. Devadatta (660-690)
4. Bhagadatta (690-720)
5. Navarjun (720-750)
6. Madhab (750-780)
7. Pramardan (780-810)

== See also ==
- History of Sylhet
