= Gour Kingdom =

Medieval kingdom in Sylhet

Gour kingdom
- 600-900–1303
- Capital: Borchola (first), Bank of Malini stream (royal) and Mona Rai hill (minister)
- Languages: Sanskrit, Prakrit
- Religion: Hinduism (official)
- Government: Monarchy
- Raja
  - 630-660: Gurak (first (legendary))
  - 1260-1303: Gour Govinda (last)
- Chief minister
  - 630-660: Marbel (first)
  - 1060-1100: Vanamali Kar
  - 1250-1260: Madan Rai
  - 1260-1303: Mona Rai (last)
- Historical era: Classical period
  - Established: 600-900
  - Disestablished: 1303
Preceded by	Succeeded by
Jaintia kingdom	Taraf kingdom; Lakhnauti Sultanate
- Today part of: Bangladesh

The Gour kingdom was one of the greater of the many petty kingdoms of the medieval Sylhet region. According to legend, it was founded by Gurak, off-shooting from Kamarupa's Jaintia kingdom in 630. Much of its early history is considered legendary or mythological up until Navagirvana who is mentioned in the Bhatera copper-plate inscriptions. The Kings of Gour are described as patrons of Hindu revivalism in what was previously a predominantly Buddhist and animist populated land.

The 11th century king Govinda-Rana Kesava Deva is recognised for introducing the navadinga (nine war boats) and heavily improving the kingdom's infantry, cavalry, and elephant power. Due to familial tensions, the kingdom split into two separate kingdoms in 1170; Gour (Northern Sylhet) and Brahmachal (Southern Sylhet), before being reunited by Raja Govardhan in the early years of his reign. However, this would be short-lasted as during Govardhan's reign, the kingdom would suffer attacks from neighbouring kingdoms of all directions; eventually leading to the latter's death and the annexation of Brahmachal from Gour to Twipra. Gour Govinda would be the last king to succeed him. In contrast to Govardhan, he would revive Gour back into a regional superpower, warding off all potential enemies, regaining lost territory, introducing defensive strategies like archery in war for the first time in Bengal's history and improving Gour's military status. Noted as a Hindu Revivalist, Gour Govinda encouraged the Hindu way of life . The kingdom came to an end after the Islamic conquest of Sylhet in 1303 led by Sikandar Khan Ghazi, Syed Nasiruddin and Shah Jalal, leading to the flight of Govinda and the royal family, and the subsequent incorporation of Sylhet with mainland Muslim Bengal ruled by Sultan Shamsuddin Firuz Shah.

== Name ==
There are many theories behind the naming of the Gour kingdom. Some say that the name originated from the kingdom's founder; Gurak, the son of Raja Guhak just as Jaintia was named after Jayantak and Laur after Ladduk. Other theories are that it was named following the 1170 partition of the kingdom into two. The north was renamed Gour (also transliterated as Gauda in Sanskrit) as in imitation of the great Hindu Gauda kingdom which ruled Bengal from 590AD to 626AD.

== Location and origin ==
The kingdom consisted of majority of the modern-day Sylhet District. It included some eastern parts of the modern-day Moulvibazar District until it split from Gour to become the independent kingdom of Brahmachal. The final king of Gour, Gour Govinda would reunite Brahmachal to the Gour kingdom. The Tungachal kingdom, to its southwest, was a vassal state of Gour, and later Brahmachal would be one as well. With Govinda turning Gour into a regional superpower, the Laur kingdom may have also been a vassal state as Takerghat (in Laur) was made the naval headquarters during Govinda's rule. In the 850s, much of the kingdom's territory was described to be "outside the pale of human habitation" with central and southwestern Sylhet forming a large sea. This explains the naval significance which the Kings of Gour boasted.

The early rulers of Gour were said to have belonged to an animist clan known as the Pator-Chutia or Patro which later converted to Hinduism after Raja Guhak's interest in the religion and his initial invitation to Brahmins from Kamarupa to come and migrate to Sylhet. The small tribe remains in existence today and are also known by their endonym, the Laleng, and claim descent from these kings although this cannot be proven. Their traditions are a mixture of tribal animistic and Hindu beliefs. They have a distinct language to Bengali and Sylheti and many migrated to Assam and Meghalaya following the 1947 Partition of India and 1971 Bangladesh Liberation War.

== History ==
=== Establishment ===
Xuanzang was a Chinese Buddhist monk who travelled to Sheelachatal (Sylhet) in the seventh century.

Before the establishment of the Gour kingdom, the area was a part of the Jaintia kingdom in greater Kamarupa. When Guhak ascended the Jaintia throne, he married a princess from Kamarupa. Guhak had a deep interest in Hinduism and migration of Brahmins from Kamarupa to this area took place. On his way back, Guhak brought a stone image known as Kangsa-Nisudhana, an image of Krishna and Balarama murdering Kamsa, as well as Grivakali and Janghakali, and they put it on top of a hill in modern-day where they would worship it. During the British colonial Bengal Presidency, this hill was also home to the Civil Surgeon's Bungalow.

Guhak had three sons, Jayantak, Gurak and Ladduk, and two daughters, Sheela and Chatala. It is said that his eldest daughter, Sheela, was once bathing in a lake south of the Kangsa-Nisudhana hill and she was kidnapped. After being rescued by Guhak, Sheela started to become more religious and live a secluded life. Chatala indulged herself in an unlawful relationship with one of the palace servants, leading to her being disowned and dumped in a distant island in the middle of 2000 square mile lake to the south of the kingdom. After Sheela's death at a young age, Guhak gave up his kingdom to also lead a more ascetic life. This port-area around the lake, which was the largest centre in the Jaintia kingdom for trade, was named "Sheela haat" in her honour. Sources such as the Hattanath Tales mention Sheelachatal was named after both daughters for the region. This is one of many theories of how Sylhet got its name. Xuanzang of Tang China mentions that he visited Sheelachatal in the 630s in his book, the Great Tang Records on the Western Regions.

Guhak split the Jaintia kingdom into three for his three sons. He gave his eldest son, Jayantak, what would become the hilly Jaintia kingdom. He gave his second son, Gurak, the southern plains which would be named Gour, and he gave his third son, Luddak, the western plains which would become the Laur kingdom.

Gurak made the capital initially at Borchola, five miles northwest of modern-day Sylhet, but moved it to Malini stream bank, 7 miles south of Sylhet. He appointed Marbel as his chief minister. The minister was stationed in a hillock (now known as Mona Rai's Tila) near the port for ease in tax collection and civil duties.

=== Mass migration period ===
Being separated from Kamarupa by the Jaintia kingdom, Gour started interacting more with the Hindu lands to its west such as Tripura and Prayagraj. Minister Marbel was ordered to find a wife for Gurak's son, Srihasta. He went south to the Twipra kingdom in eastern Bengal where he found a young princess for Srihasta. When Srihasta ascended the throne in 660, he too contributed to the increase of Hindu influence to the predominantly Tantric Buddhist and animist-populated land. He installed a stone Shivalingam, which he called Bateshwar Shiva, in modern-day Bondor Bazar which he obtained during a pilgrimage to Akshayavat in Prayagraj. It is said he did this to compete with the Buddhist Lokenath statue which a group of merchants installed in modern-day Kazir Bazar. Gour also bordered Bengal to the west which was ruled by the Buddhist Pala Empire. The Buddhist and later Muslim rule in Bengal led to large numbers of Hindus to migrate to Gour, which was considered a Hindu stronghold. Srihasta's reign ended in 690 AD and he was succeeded by Kritti Pal. The names of the four kings who succeeded Kritti Pal is unknown until 870 AD, when Bhut Vishnudeva ascends the throne as the 7th king of Gour. He was known to have been mute.

He was succeeded by Navagirvan Deva (also known as Ananta Deva Navagirvanta) who is mentioned in the Bhatera copper-plate inscription as Kharavana (sharp arrow thrower). The Bhatera copper-plate inscription mentions the rulers of Gour from Navagirvan up to Kesava Deva providing evidence of the chronicles of Gour in this period whilst the previous history before Navagirvan is considered legendary. Navagirvan is attributed for bringing prosperity to Srihatta. His son, Gokul Kishore Deva was described in the inscription to be so strong that he imposed inactivity to enemy kingdoms. Gokul's son, Narayana Deva had a minister named Nandaka and a son named Govinda-Rana Kesava Deva. He was faced with confronting a number of rebellions.

The 11th King of Gour was Govinda-Rana Kesava Deva, also known as the Ripuraj Gopi Govinda. He became king in 990 AD after the death of his father, Narayan Deva. He is considered to be one of the greatest kings of Gour. In 1027, he constructed a towering stone Krishna temple on the Kangsa-Nisudhana hill (which became the hillock of the Civil Surgeon's Bungalow during British rule). A famed patron of Hinduism, he hosted hundreds of Brahmins and Vedic scholars from Mithila and other parts of the subcontinent, employing them upon the services of temples in his kingdom. He performed a yajna, distributing gold equivalent to his body weight. The Brahmins who had migrated from Kamarupa were experienced in seafaring and navies. They built nine ships (navadinga), some being two-storied and with up to 120 oars. These boats; Chali, Hali, Jilkar, Hakaluka, Makarasya, Chatali, Damuria, Barua and Baral are said to be what the modern-day haors of Sylhet take their names from. The Navadinga boasted the power of Gour's kings who would use them when warring with neighbouring petty kingdoms as well as for trade. Kesava is also recognised for heavily improving the kingdom's infantry, cavalry, navy and elephant power. He practiced polygyny and had two sons, Jadava and Kangsa from his first wife, Kamala. After invading the kingdom of Kuchunia to his north ruled by Uraj Mardan, he also married Mardan's daughter Chandana and had a son with her named Ishan Deva. After the death of Srichandra of eastern Bengal's Chandra dynasty, Kesava took advantage and conquered the southern parts of the Sylhet region; extending the Gour kingdom south of the Kushiyara River.

Kesava's singh gour reign ended in 1040, leaving behind three sons; Jadava Kesava, Kangsa Narayan and Ishan Deva. The elder son, Jadava was meant to be king though he was said to have been childless and diseased, and so his brother, Kangsa Narayan became the next king instead. Kangsa established a satra in the memory of his father, and dug Kamala Lake in memory of his mother, Kamala. Kangsa's rule was very short as he was killed by a wild elephant at a young age. His newly-wed and pregnant wife, Kalavati, a princess from Bihar, became the queen regent with Prince Ishan Deva, General Viradatta and Minister Vanamali Kar managing the kingdom. Kalavati gave birth to a son who was named Pravir Deva. To celebrate Pravir's birth, Ishan installed the Madhu-Kaitabhari Temple - which contained an image of Vishnu - on a hillock now known as Manik Pir's hill. The installation ceremony was conducted by a group of Brahmins and they were rewarded by the administration by receiving excessive land grants in the kingdom. Ishan also possessed war-chariots. Pravir Deva became the Raja of Gour when he reached a mature age in 1080 AD. He had a son named Bhujavir.

=== Partition ===
Brahmachal infiltration
Date	1253
Location	Brahmachal palace (Baramchal, Kulaura)
Result	Amar Singh replaces Upananda as the ruler of Brahmachal
Territorial changes	Brahmachal re-annexed to Gour

Belligerents
Gour kingdom	Brahmachal kingdom Twipra kingdom (defector)

Commanders and leaders
Raja Govardhan: Minister Madan Rai; Commander-in-chief Virabhadra; Commander Shandul; Prince Garuda	Raja Upananda †: Commander Amar Singh (defector); Minister (name unknown); Jaidev Rai (minister's son); Kuki chiefs (defector)

In 1140 AD, after the death of Bhujavir Deva, his son Kshetra Pal ascended the throne. Raja Kshetra Pal also practised polygyny and had two wives; Ratnavati and Surama. During his reign, an earthquake took place which changed the country's contour and topography. It is said that a new river emerged in the town, which the King named after his second and favourite wife, Rani Surama, as the Surma River. The King's first son came from Surama and his name was Brahmajit. A few years later, Kshetra's first wife Ratnavati also gave birth to a son, called Dharmadhwaj. However, conspiracies emerged in the country as a number of people were suspicious of Ratnavati accusing her of jealousy and child illegitimacy as Kshetra was an old man by this time. After Kshetra died, his eldest son, Brahmajit stepped to the throne. His stepmother Ratnavati and her associates gave Brahmajit a hard time as she believed that as she was the elder wife, her son should have been the King.

Scared for his life, Brahmajit moved his capital to a place known as Brahmachal (now Baramchal, Kulaura), just north of the Twipra kingdom. He then appointed his stepbrother Dharmadhwaj to govern over the old capital, which retained its name as Gour. Conflict did not emerge as both rulers thought that they were in control of the kingdom as a whole, but gradually the two lands split to become two different kingdoms; Gour and Brahmachal in 1170 AD. The two stepsons worked together and hosted a Vedic yajna at the Bhatera Homer Tila at Brahmachal which was arranged by Nidhipati Shastri, who was a descendant of Ananda Shastri - a Brahmin from Mithila who arrived in Sylhet during the rule of Govinda-Rana Kesava Deva. Another yajna was hosted by Raja Sengkwchak Dharmadhar of the Twipra kingdom with Nidhipati as a priest as well who was rewarded with what would become the Ita kingdom. Dharmadhwaj of Gour died in 1200, and was succeeded by his son, Rajadhwaj who ruled until his death in 1230 in which his son, Gouradhwaj Bhabananda took the throne.

=== Civil war ===
Raja Govardhan rose to power in 1250 following the death of his father, Gouradhwaj. During this period, Upananda was the King of Brahmachal. The long-lasted conflict between the north and south continued during Govardhan's reign. Govardhan appointed his chief minister, Madan Rai, to somehow find a way to lure Upananda's general, Amar Singh, to use him as a tool to infiltrate Brahmachal, as Govardhan was not fond of Upananda. Govardhan and Rai then made an agreement with Govardhan's general Virabhadra to give his daughter, Chandrakala, in marriage to Singh. The marriage was successful, despite protests, and Singh maintained a good relationship with General Virabhadra and a developing relationship with the Gour royal court. Singh had close ties with the Kuki chiefs, the border guards for the Twipra kingdom south of Brahmachal. He managed to persuade the Kuki chiefs into raiding Raja Upananda's palace in the dead of the night, massacring most of its inmates. With the emergence of a civil war between Brahmachal and Gour, Raja Upananda was subsequently killed. Brahmachal became a part of the Gour kingdom again, and Govardhan appointed Amar Singh as its feudal governor. Babysat by the Upananda's older sister-in-law, Anna Purna, thirteen royal children managed to flee to the jungles where they stumbled across Giridhari, a Bihari sannyasi, Giridhari took them to Kamakhya Temple where they were trained into hermitage and would return to Gour a few years later during the tribal invasion.

=== Conflict with Tungachal ===
Tungachal conflict
Date	1258
Location	Banks of Ghungi Jurir Haor, Tungachal
Result	Shandul replaces Epivishnu as the ruler of Brahmachal
Territorial changes	Tungachal secured to Gour administration

Belligerents
Gour kingdom	Tungachal kingdom Brahmachal remnant officers

Commanders and leaders
Raja Govardhan: Minister Madan Rai; Commander-in-chief Virabhadra; Commander Shandul; Prince Garuda; Raja Amar Singh †	Raja Epivishnu †: General Raghu (POW); Minister Bhadra Janardan

Brahmachal which was ruled by Upananda contained the territory of Tungachal. In effect, this meant that the feudal ruler of Tungachal, Epivishnu - who was not given a choice - was effectively under the control of Amar Singh. Having close ties with Brahmachal and Tripura, Epivishnu was adamant to Govardhan and Singh's amicable compromises. With Epivishnu refusing every pleasant proposal given to be a feudal ruler under Gour, Govardhan and Singh decided it was time that they dethrone Epivishnu and appoint someone else to govern Tungachal. The Gour forces entered Tungachal, and a battle emerged on the banks of the Ghungi Jurir Haor. Raja Epivishnu was murdered and his commander-in-chief General Raghu was kidnapped and taken as a captive back to Gour. Govardhan then appointed his second general, Shandul, to be the feudal ruler of Tungachal.

=== Tribal invasion ===
The Raja of the Twipra kingdom, Ratan Manikya was informed of Singh's treacherous actions and how he tricked the Kuki chiefs, he decided that he has to take action. He was also told of the murder of Raja Epivishnu, whom he was a friend of. Ratan believed the Gour administration was going too far and decided to also put a stop to Govardhan's scheme to invade other neighbouring kingdoms. He sent a contingent towards Brahmachal to attack Amar Singh. Singh's forces were outnumbered, and requested assistance from Govardhan. However, Govardhan was unable to help as Gour was facing an invasion in the north from the Jaintia kingdom. Singh was killed by the Tripura forces and the Kuki chiefs saw this as an opportunity for them to annex Brahmachal to the Twipra kingdom. Jaidev Rai, son of the minister of Raja Upananda, who was the king of Brahmachal before Amar Singh, was made the feudal ruler under the Tripuris. The Tripuris then proceeded to Tungachal, in an attempt to dethrone Shandul. Shandul decided to flee to Gour, thus enabling the Tripuris to bloodlessly annex Tungachal to its kingdom as well. The former minister of Tungachal, Bhadra Janardan, was appointed as the feudal ruler of Tungachal under the Twipra kingdom.

The Jaintia kingdom, north of Gour, attempted to invade and annex Gour to its kingdom as they could see that Govardhan was focused on the insurgencies in the southern areas of his kingdom and on securing Brahmachal and Tungachal. The various indigenous tribes and neighbouring kingdoms including the Tripuris, Kukis, Kacharis and Nagas joined forces with the Pnar and Khasi of the Jaintia kingdom in attacking Northern Sylhet. Being attacked from both north and south directions, and having no support from neighbouring states, Govardhan was dethroned and killed in battle. However, the thirteen royals of Brahmachal who had fled to Kamakhya during the civil war, had returned to Gour, guided by Giridhari, after receiving military training, religious and magical education from the Kamrup region for a number of years. Being led by Upananda's nephew, Gour Govinda, they defeated the rebels; warding them all off and recapturing Gour. Govardhan's heir, Garuda, was still a minor and so the queen-mother Apurna consented to Govinda being the King of Gour.

=== Restoration ===
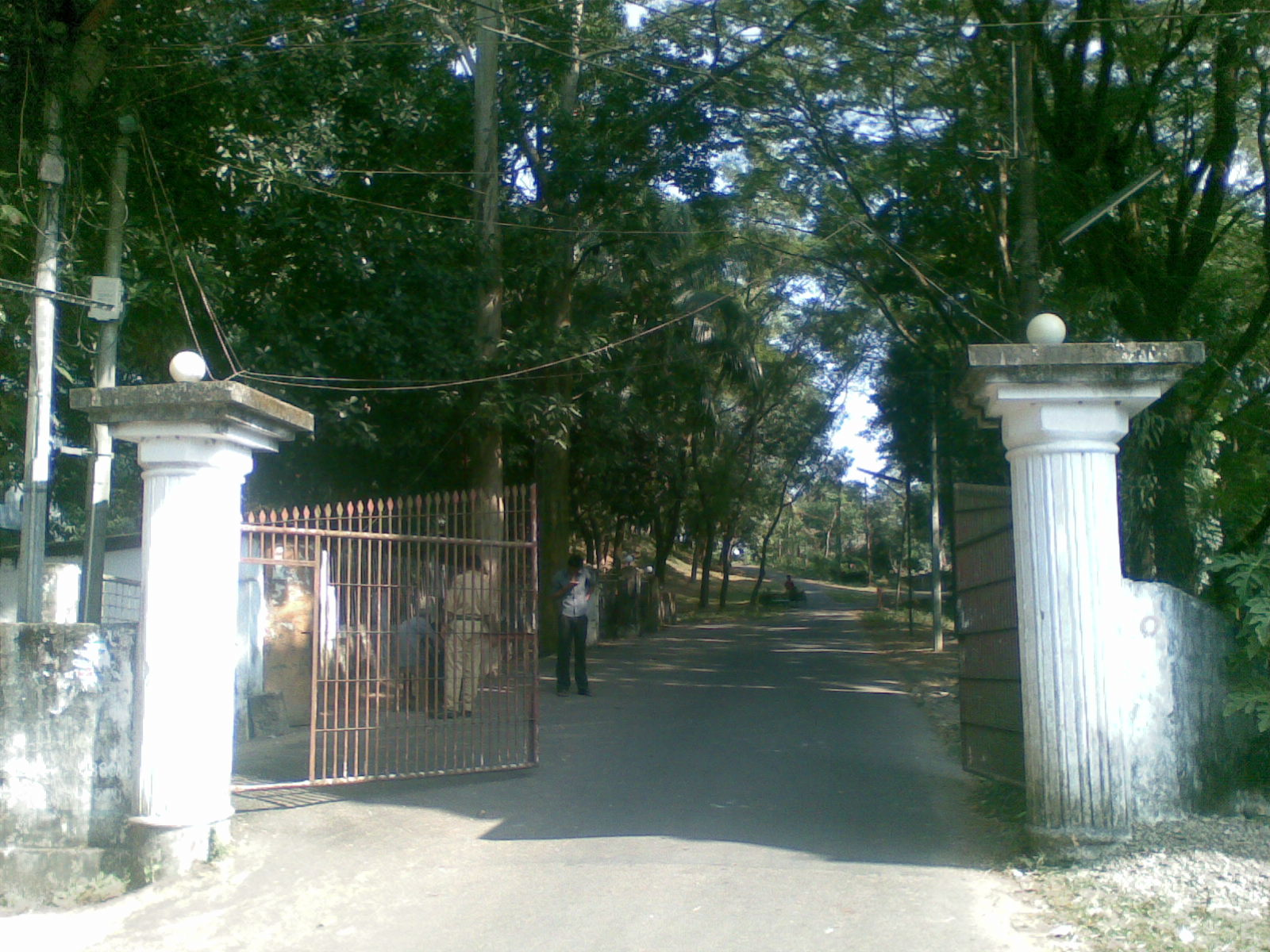
The hill of Raja Gour Govinda in Chowhatta, Sylhet

Gour Govinda dramatically restored Gour's reputation as a regional superpower by constructing forts all over his kingdom, guarding his kingdom with large stones (shil; from which the name Shilhot/Sylhet is theorised to have come from) and establishing a number of military training camps. He built a seven-storey stone brick tower in Penchagor which he called Gorduar, which would serve as the new capital. Govinda is credited to introducing archery in war for the first time in the History of Bengal. To prove his might, he tied the Khasi king to ropes, bringing him to Gour. The Khasi paid a ransom to Gour to free their king. Using Puni beel as his battlefield against states like Laur and Jaintia, Govinda "drowned his challengers" to such an extent that Gour was described to be "free of enemies" during his reign. By making peace with Ratan Manikya of Tripura and gifting him an elephant, he was able to retrieve Brahmachal and Tungachal back to Gour administration. He appointed his brother-in-law, Achak Narayan, to govern Tungachal.

=== Muslim conquest ===
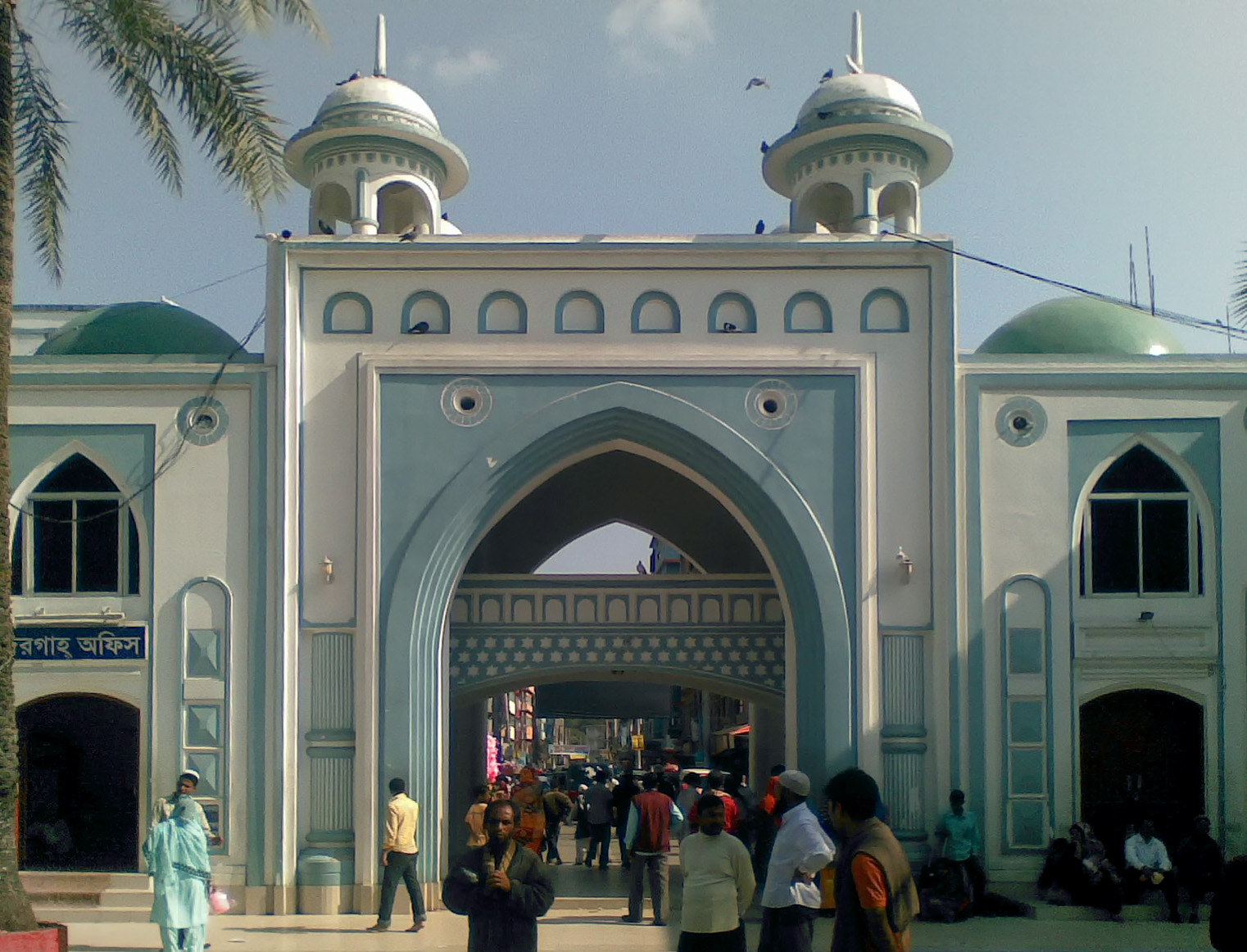
The shrine of Shah Jalal is now a popular site in Sylhet, which has become the spiritual capital of Bangladesh.

Govinda successfully settled many Brahmins from all over the Muslim-conquered lands of Deccan, Central India and Bengal to live in his kingdom; which they recognised as a Hindu stronghold. They gained some authority in the kingdom, being favoured by Govinda over the native Hindus for their religious orthodoxy. The elitist Brahmins cooperatively led a movement against members of other religions in Gour. They favoured the Brahmins of Brahmachal brought over during the reign of Brahmajit. The followers of Tantric Buddhism were treated as dalits (untouchables) of the lowest social status. The Brahmins from Central India brought by Govinda-Rana Kesava Deva, were looked down upon by the Deccan Brahmins as low-class "Govinda Brahmins" as well, in addition to the Hindu Namasudras, Kaivartas and Dasas who were influenced too much by Buddhism.

A small number of Muslim families from neighbouring Bengal also settled in Gour, possibly following Malik Ikhtiyaruddin Iuzbak's 1254 Azmardan Invasion. One day, Ghazi Burhanuddin - who lived with his family in Tultikar - sacrificed a cow for the aqiqah of his newborn son, Gulzar Alam. Gour Govinda, in a fury for what he saw as sacrilege due to his Hindu beliefs, had the newborn killed as well as having Burhanuddin's right hand cut off. Shortly after this incident, Qadi Nuruddin of Taraf celebrated his son's marriage ceremony by slaughtering a cow for them to eat. The Qadi was executed by the feudal ruler Achak Narayan. After both men being punished, Burhanuddin and Nuruddin's brother, Halimuddin, travelled to lower Bengal where they addressed their issue with Sultan Shamsuddin Firoz Shah. This marked the start of the Conquest of Sylhet in 1303, with the Sultan appointing his nephew, Sikandar Khan Ghazi, to lead an army against the Raja. A number of battles took place, with Govinda managing to defeat the Muslims of Bengal. However, in the final battle, Govinda fled with his family following the arrival of the warrior-saint Shah Jalal and his companions, numbering over three hundred. Sikandar Khan Ghazi was appointed the first Wazir of Sylhet, and Tungachal would subsequently be captured off Achak Narayan in the following year by Syed Nasiruddin and his 12 lascars. ghaturam

== Rulers ==
Titular name	Reign	Officers	Notes
Gurak (গুড়ক)	630–660	Marbel (chief minister)	Son of Raja Guhak of greater Jaintia who split his kingdom into three, giving a third to Gurak
Srihasta (শ্রীহস্ত)	660–690		2nd Raja, son of Raja Gurak; married a Tripuri princess
Kritti Pal (কৃত্তিপাল)	690–720		3rd Raja, son of Srihasta
Unknown rulers (720-870)
Bhut Vishnudeva (ভূত বিষ্ণুদেব)	870–900		7th Raja
Navagirvan Kharavana Dev (নবর্গিবান খরবাণ দেব)	900–930		8th Raja, son of Bhut
Gokul Kishore (গোকুল কিশোর)	930–960		9th Raja, son of Navagirvan
Narayan Deva (নারায়ণ দেব)	960–990		10th Raja, son of Gokul
Govinda-Rana Kesava Deva (গোবিন্দ রণ কেশব দেব)	990–1040	Kamala and Chandana (queens), Jadava, Kangsa and Ishan (princes)	11th Raja, son of Narayan
Kangsa Narayan (কংস নারায়ণ)	1040–1060	Kalavati (queen),	12th Raja, son of Govinda and Kamala
Ishan Deva (ঈশান দেব)	1060–1080	Vanamali Kar (chief minister), Viradatta (commander), Kalavati (queen-regent)	13th ruler (acting), son of Govinda and Chandana
Pravir Deva (প্রবীর দেব)	1080–1100	Vanamali Kar (chief minister), Viradatta (commander), Kalavati (queen-mother)	14th Raja, son of Kangsa Narayan
Bhujavir (ভুজবীর or ভূজবীর)	1100–1140	Kshetra Pal (prince)	15th Raja, son of Pravir
Kshetra Pal (ক্ষেত্রপাল)	1140–1170	Ratnavati and Surama (queens), Dharmadhwaj and Rajadhwaj (princes)	16th Raja, son of Bhujavir
Partition of Gour
Dharmadhwaj (ধর্মধ্বজ)	1170–1200	Ruled Gour, alongside Brahmajit who moved to Brahmachal	17th Raja, son of Kshetra and Ratnavati
Rajadhwaj (রাজধ্বজ)	1200–1230		18th Raja, son of Dharmadhwaj
Gouradhwaj Bhabananda (গৌড়ধ্বজ ভবানন্দ)	1230–1250		19th Raja, son of Rajadhwaj
Gangadhwaj Govardhan (গঙ্গাধ্বজ গোবর্ধন)	1250–1260	Madan Rai (chief minister), Apurna (queen), Virabhadra (commander-in-chief), Shandul (Tungachal governor), Garuda (heir-apparent), Raja Amar Singh (Brahmachal governor)	20th Raja, son of Gouradhwaj Bhabananda
Gour Govinda (গৌড় গোবিন্দ)	1260–1303	Mona Rai (chief minister), Chakrapani Dutta (commander), Hiravati (queen), Apurna (queen-mother), Achak Narayan (Tungachal governor), Garuda and Nirvana (princes), Shantipriya (princess)	21st Raja, defended Gour during Jaintia invasion, descendant of Brahmajit
Islamic Conquest of Gour, end of Gour kingdom

== Legacy ==
In 1877, two copper-plate inscriptions were discovered in the Itertilla or Homer Tila mound in the estate of Babu Jagachchandra Deb Choudhury in the village of Bhatera. It was found 8 feet deep whilst the folks were removing old bricks from the foundations of an ancient building. H. Luttman-Johnson, the deputy commissioner of Sylhet, passed copies of these onto Sanskrit scholars. The first 29 lines are in Sanskrit, the next 22 lines are in early Bengali and the last four lines are in an unknown language with a possibility of it being in Kukish. The first plate was written during the reign of Govinda-Rana Kesava Deva and mentions the land grants he made as well as the three kings who preceded him, starting with Navagirvan. The second plate was written during Ishan Deva's reign, the son of Kesava.

== See also ==
- Sylhet region
- History of Sylhet
