= Rangpani =

Location
- Country: Bangladesh
- District: Sylhet

Physical characteristics
- Discharge
  - location: Meghalaya

Rangpani (Bengali: রাংপানি) is a border river and popular tourist destination located in the Mokampunji area of Jaintiapur Upazila, in the Sylhet District of Bangladesh. The tourist site is situated approximately 54 kilometers from Sylhet city. The river's clear water originates from the Ronghongkong Waterfall in the Jaintia Hills of the Indian state of Meghalaya.

== Location ==
The Rangpani river is situated in the Sripur area of Jaintiapur Upazila, Sylhet. It flows near the Bangladesh–India border, and the surrounding landscape includes tea gardens and hills. The village of Mokampunji, inhabited by the Khasi community, is located on its banks.

== Cultural Significance ==
The Rangpani river and its surrounding areas played a significant role in the Bangladeshi film industry during the 1980s and 1990s. The film Banjaram, starring the popular actors Wasim and Shabana, was almost entirely shot in the Rangpani area. A song sequence for the film Denmohor, featuring the celebrated duo, the late Salman Shah and Moushumi, was filmed at the river's source. Additionally, the debut film of the famous pair Shabnaz and Nayeem, Chandni, featured scenes and its popular song, O Amar Jaan, Tor Banshi Jeno Jadu Jane Re, which were filmed in this location. Numerous film shoots were completed here throughout the 1980s, establishing Rangpani as a place of cultural importance.

== Tourism ==
Rangpani is an attractive destination for tourists due to its clear water, stone-lined banks, and hilly surroundings. In the past, tourists gathered daily to enjoy the natural beauty of Sreepur and Rangpani. However, tourism began to decline after 1992, when the Sreepur area was officially designated a stone quarry and leased out by the Bureau of Mineral Development (BMD). As a result, the area started to lose its appeal, which also affected Rangpani. The government-sanctioned quarrying led to a degradation of the river's natural beauty, leading to a decline in tourist visits. Illegal stone extraction and plundering from the river have further endangered Rangpani's ecosystem and tourism potential. Abdul Hye Al-Hadi, president of the environmental organization Save the Heritage and Environment, has stated that with proper management and security measures, Rangpani could be developed into a more attractive tourist destination.
