= Pnar =

Pnar may refer to:

- Pnar people, a sub-tribe of the Khasi people who live in the eastern part of Meghalaya state of India, some parts of Assam bordering Meghalaya state and Bangladesh, also known as Jaintia or Synteng
- Pnar language, spoken by the Pnar people
- Passive neutron albedo reactivity, a non-destructive assay method

== See also ==
- Jaintia (disambiguation)
