= Jaintia Rajbari =

Coordinates: 25.1337°N 92.1217°E

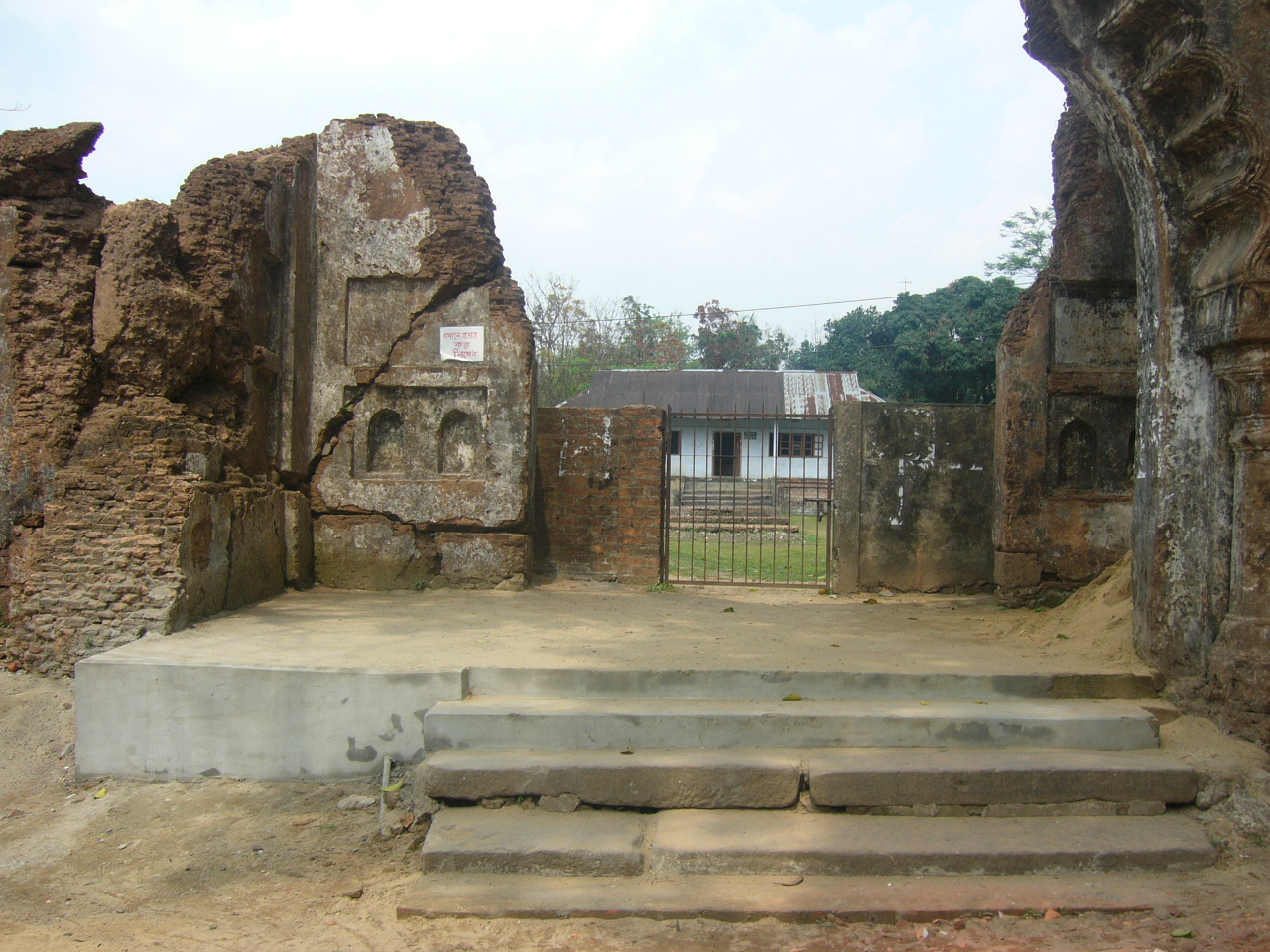
Ruins of the Jaintia Palace.

Jaintia Rajbari (Bengali: জৈন্তা রাজবাড়ী) is a royal residence located in Jaintiapur, Sylhet, Bangladesh. It was the residence of the rulers of the Jaintia Kingdom.

== See also ==
- Khasi people
- Pnar people
