= Jaintiapur Upazila =

Jaintiapur জৈন্তাপুর
- Upazila
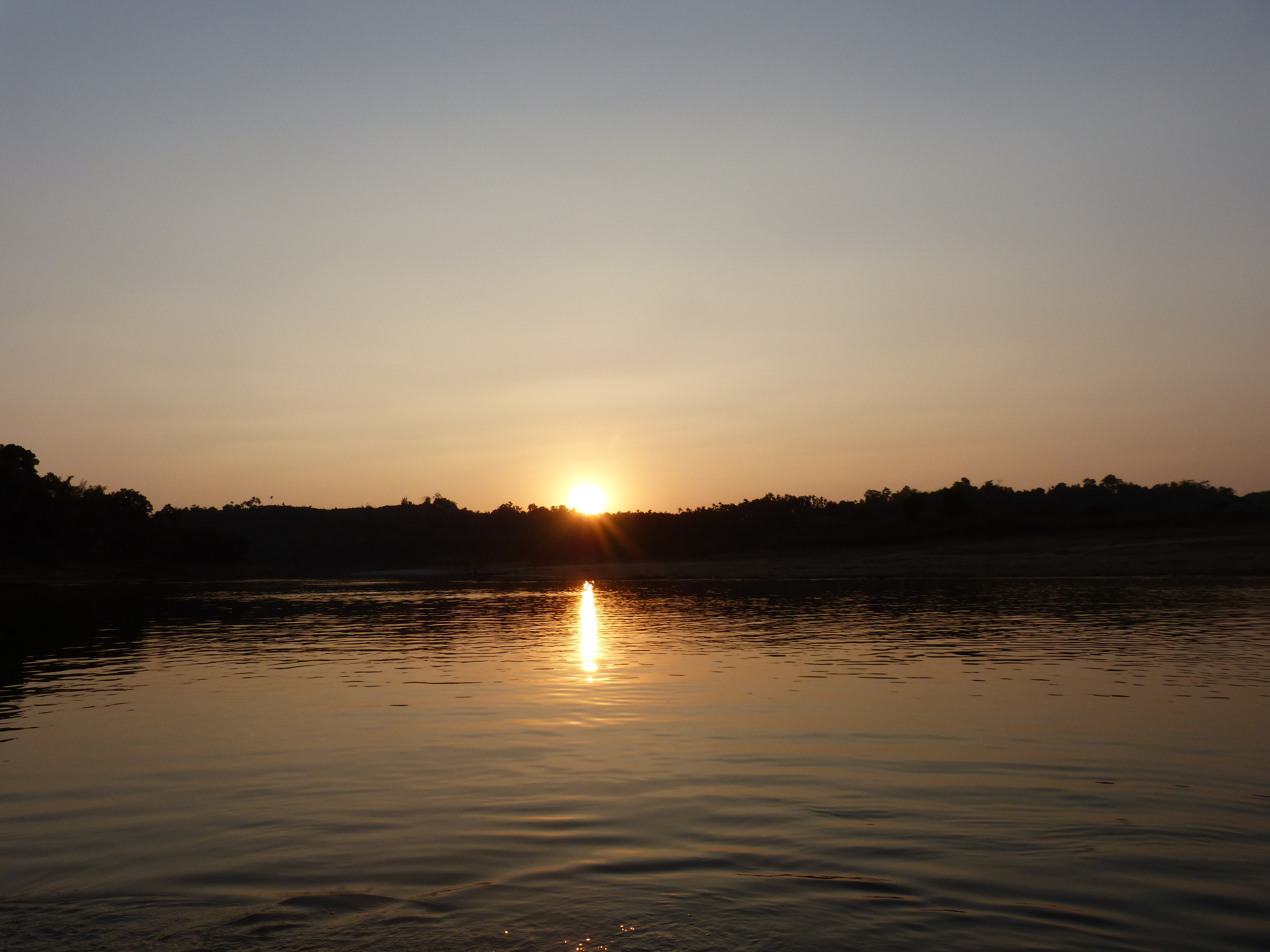
- Sari River at Lalakhal

- Coordinates: 25°7.5′N 92°7′E
- Country: Bangladesh
- Division: Sylhet
- District: Sylhet

Area
  - Total: 258.69 km^{2} (99.88 sq mi)

Population (2022)
  - Total: 200,128
  - Density: 773.62/km^{2} (2,003.7/sq mi)
- Demonym(s): Jaintapuri, Jointapuri, Zointafuri
- Time zone: UTC+6 (BST)
- Postal code: 3156
- Area code: 08229
- Website: Official Map of Jaintiapur

Jaintiapur Upazila mauza geocode map

Jaintiapur (Bengali: জৈন্তাপুর, romanized: Jointapur) is an upazila of Sylhet District in the Division of Sylhet, Bangladesh.

In the early 15th century, Jaintiapur was the capital of the Jaintia Kingdom, ruled by the Pnar people. Today, the remains of their royal palace can still be seen scattered across the town.

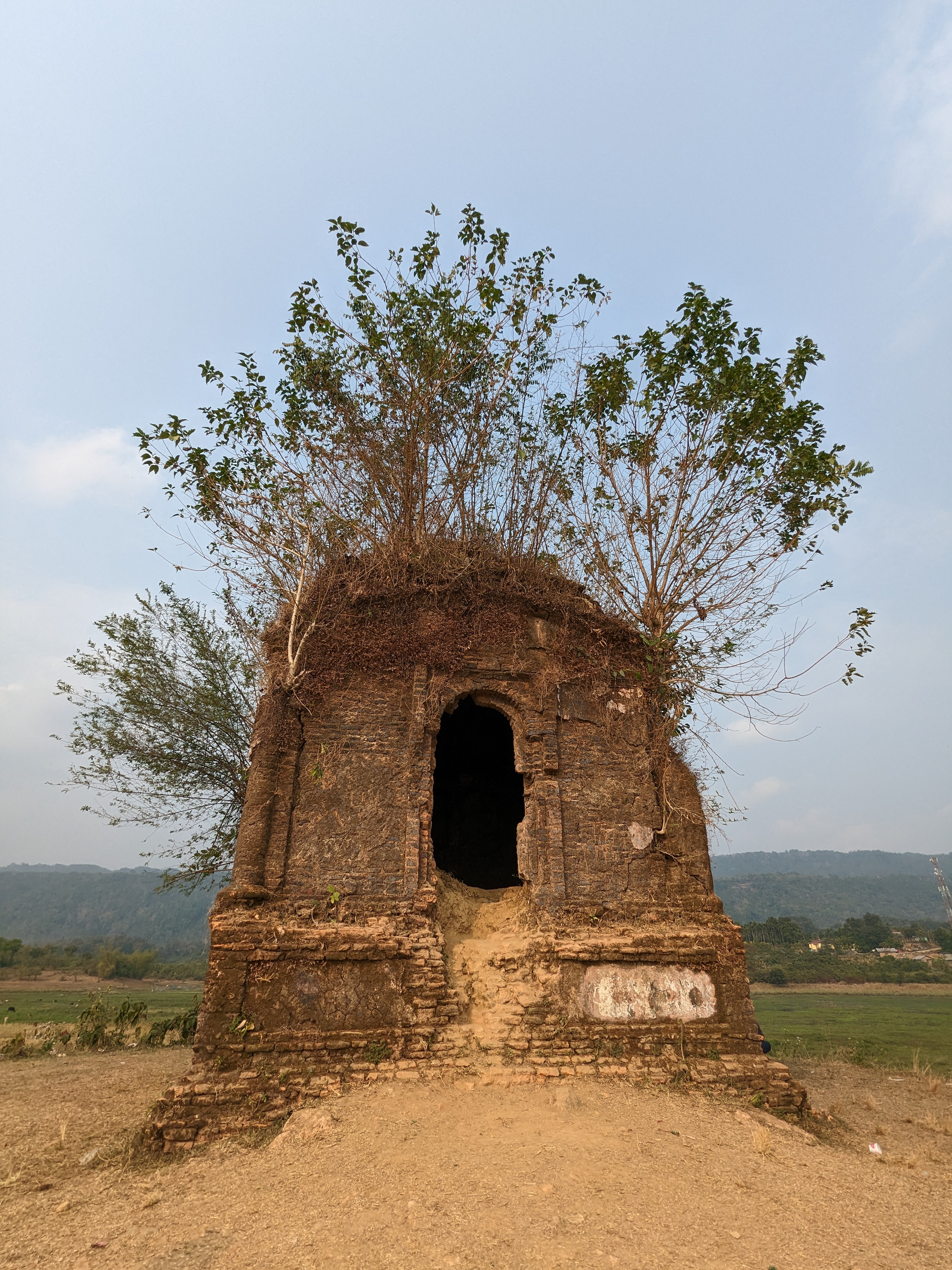
King's tomb at Dibir Haor, Jaintiapur, Sylhet

== Geography ==
Area 280.27 km^{2}, located in between 24'59' and 25'11' north latitudes and in between 92'03' and 92'14' east longitudes. It is bounded by Meghalaya State of India on the north, Kanaighat and Golapganj upazilas on the south, Kanaighat Upazila on the east, Gowainghat and Sylhet Sadar Upazila on the west. The Jaflong Hills Range is located on the northeast of the upazila.

== Demographics ==
Religions in Jaintiapur Upazila (2022)
Religion	Percent
Islam	91.35%
Hinduism	8.43%
Other or not stated	0.22%

According to the 2022 Bangladeshi census, Jaintapur Upazila had 37,286 households and a population of 200,128. 12.29% of the population were under 5 years of age. Jaintapur had a literacy rate (age 7 and over) of 71.61%: 74.06% for males and 69.20% for females, and a sex ratio of 98.88 males for every 100 females. 17,032 (8.51%) lived in urban areas.

According to the 2011 Census of Bangladesh, Jaintiapur Upazila had 27,719 households and a population of 161,744. 49,914 (30.86%) were under 10 years of age. Jaintiapur had a literacy rate (age 7 and over) of 41.15%, compared to the national average of 51.8%, and a sex ratio of 1003 females per 1000 males. 7,887 (4.88%) lived in urban areas. Ethnic population was 1,721 (1.06%), of which Khasi were 477.

As of the 2001 Bangladesh census, Jaintiapur had a population of 121458. Males constituted 63254 of the population, and females 58204. Muslim 109123, Hindu 12066, Christian 92, Buddhist 17 and others 160. Indigenous community such as khasia belongs to this upazila.

== Points of interest ==
Jaintiapur Rajbari, Jaintiapur Hill Resort, Sreepur Tea Garden, Lalakhal Tea Garden, Saytreast Research Centers, 8 No Mountain, Haripur Utlar Hill, Haripur Black Mountain, Lalakhal Tea Estate, Nazimgarh Wilderness Resorts, Lalakhal, Rangpani, Shari-Goyain River.

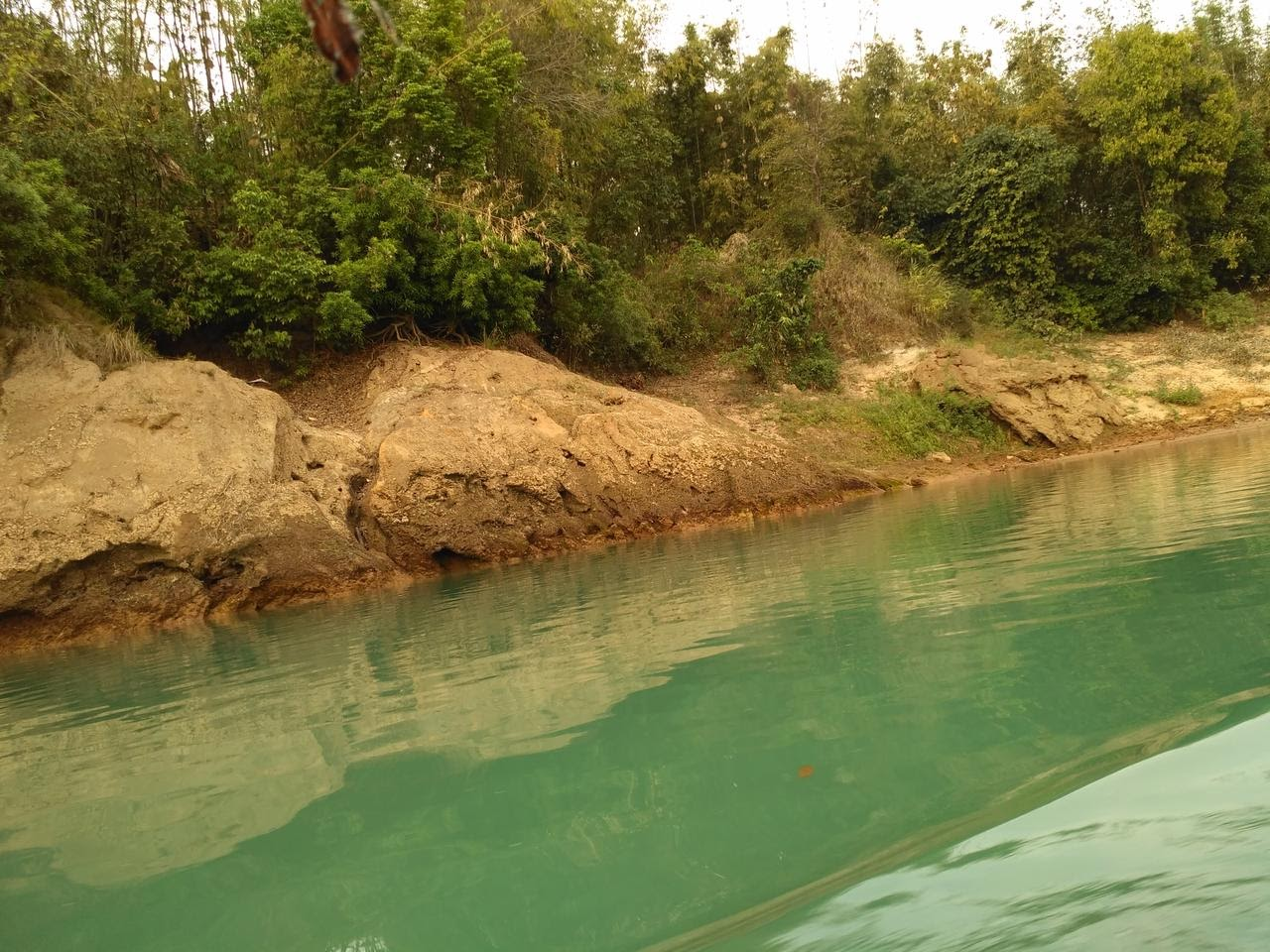
Sari river at Lalakhal

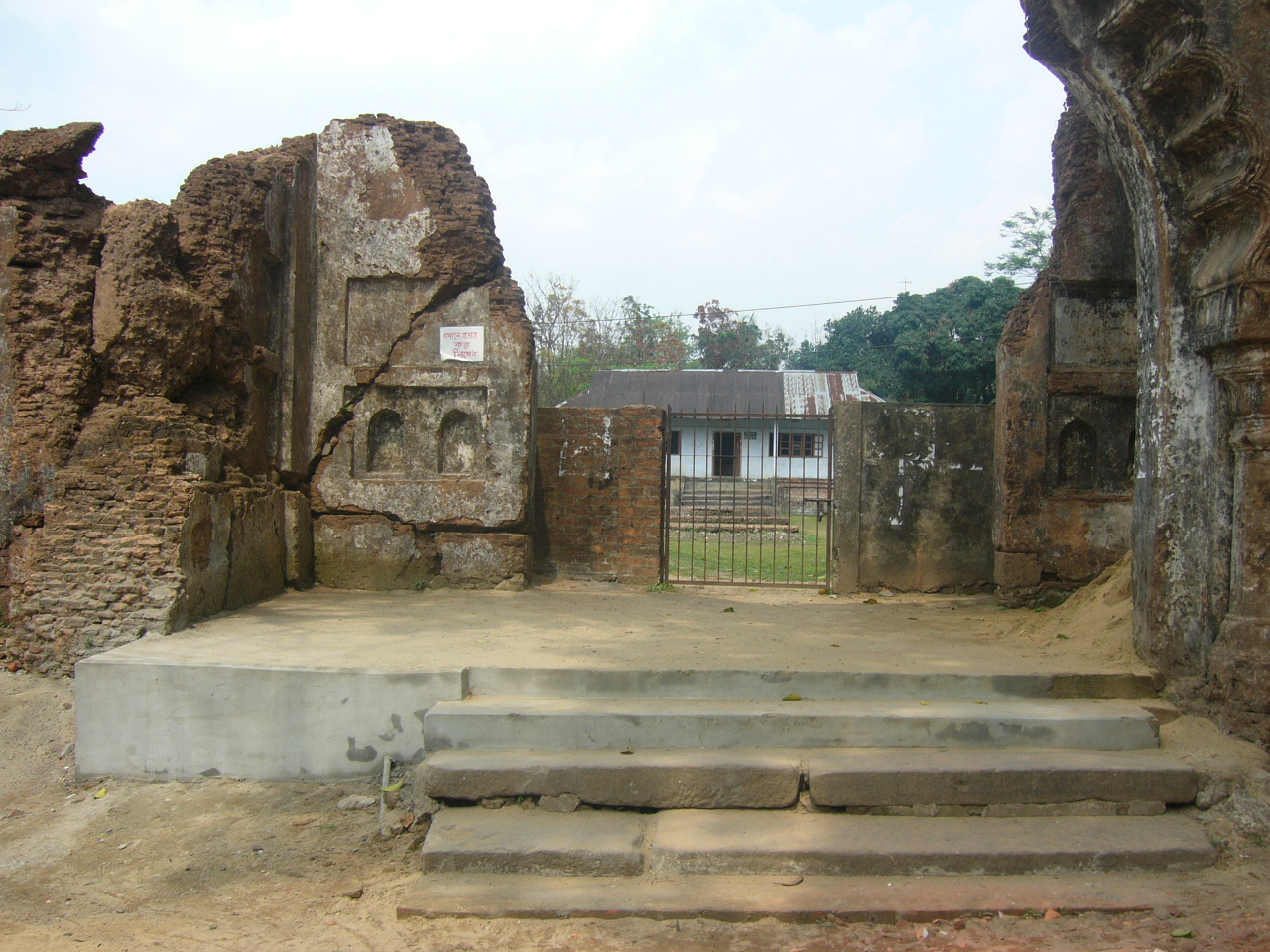
Jaintiapur Palace

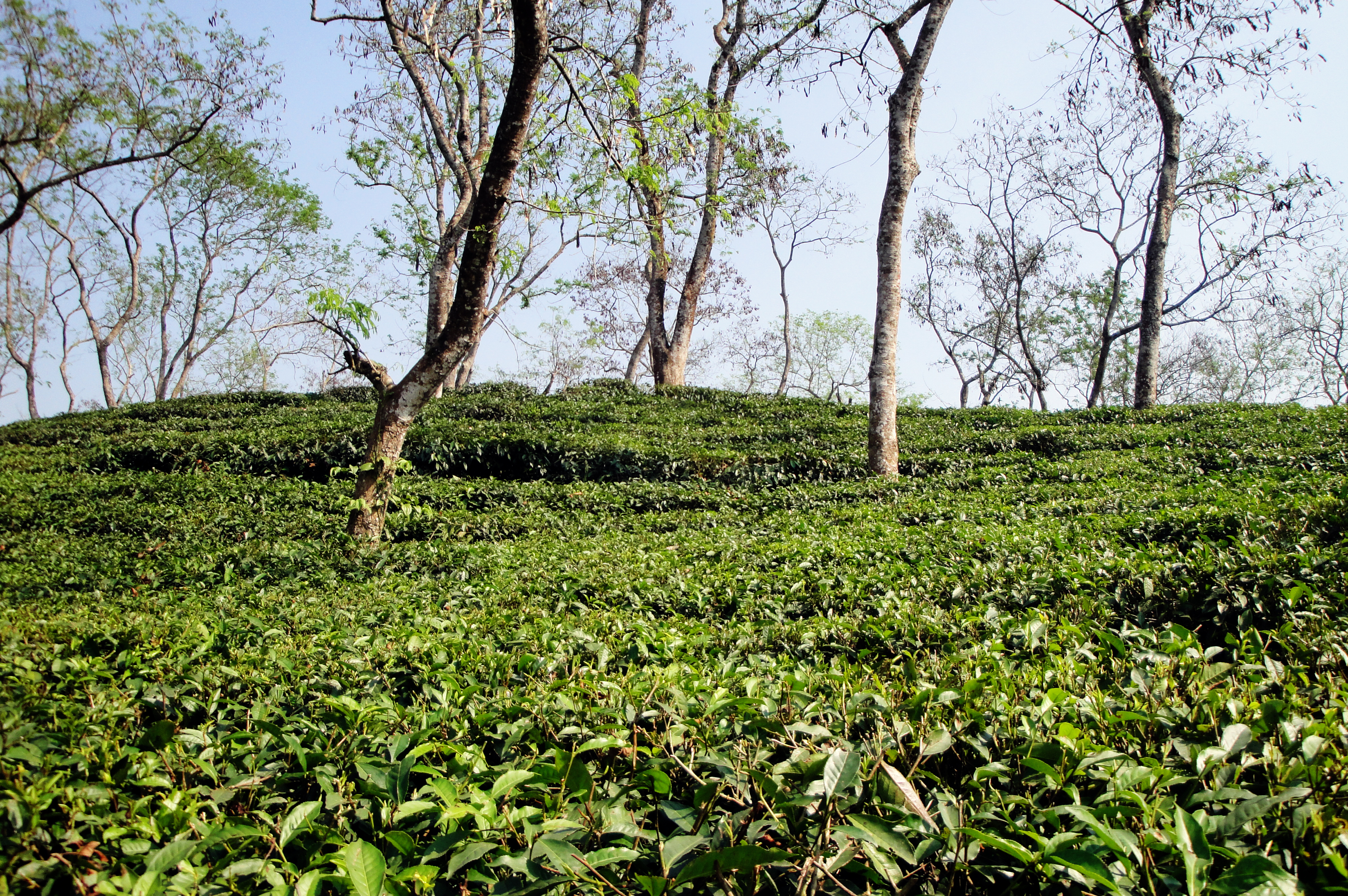
Tea garden at Sripur

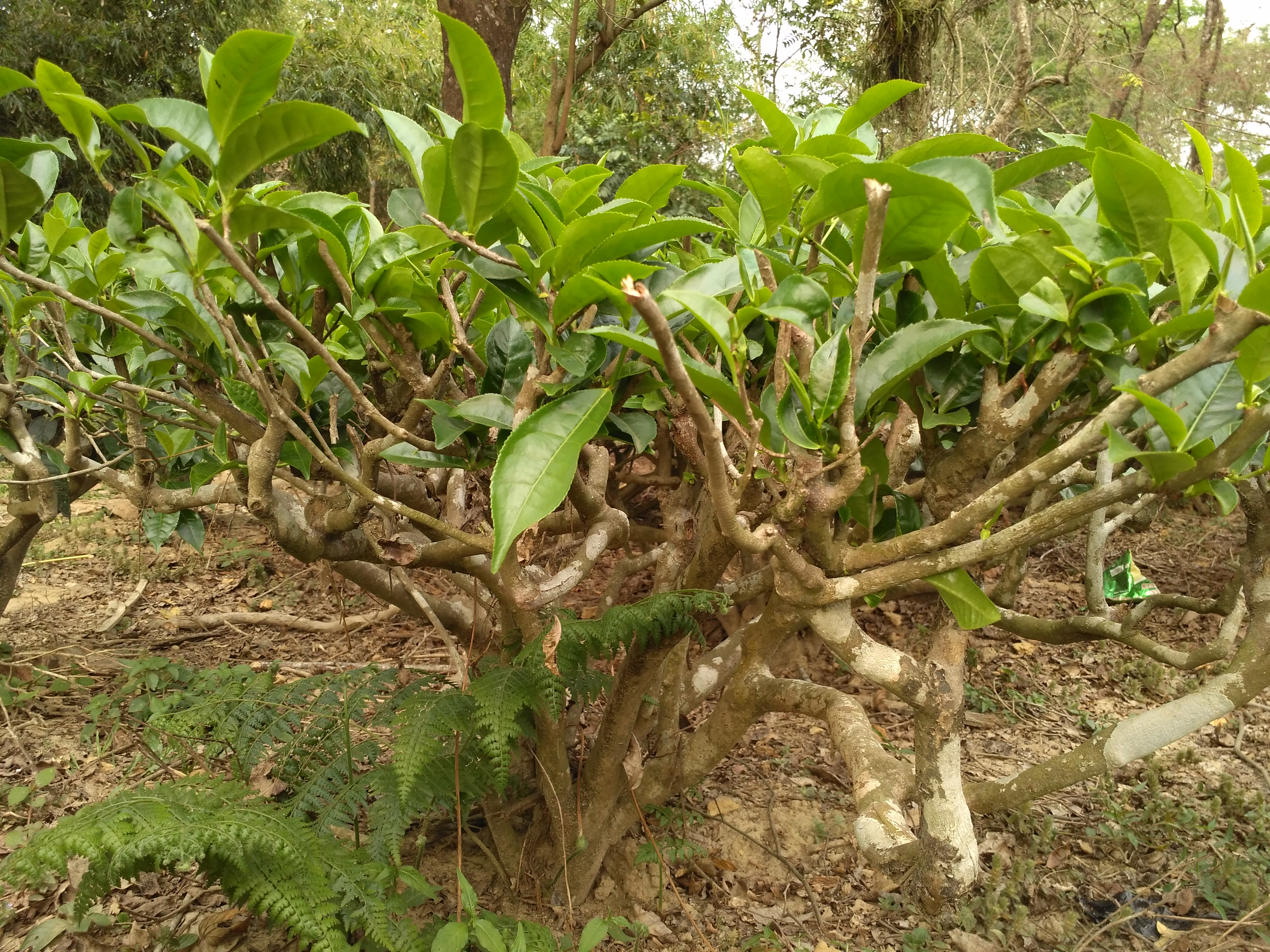
A Tea Tree in a tea garden at Sylhet

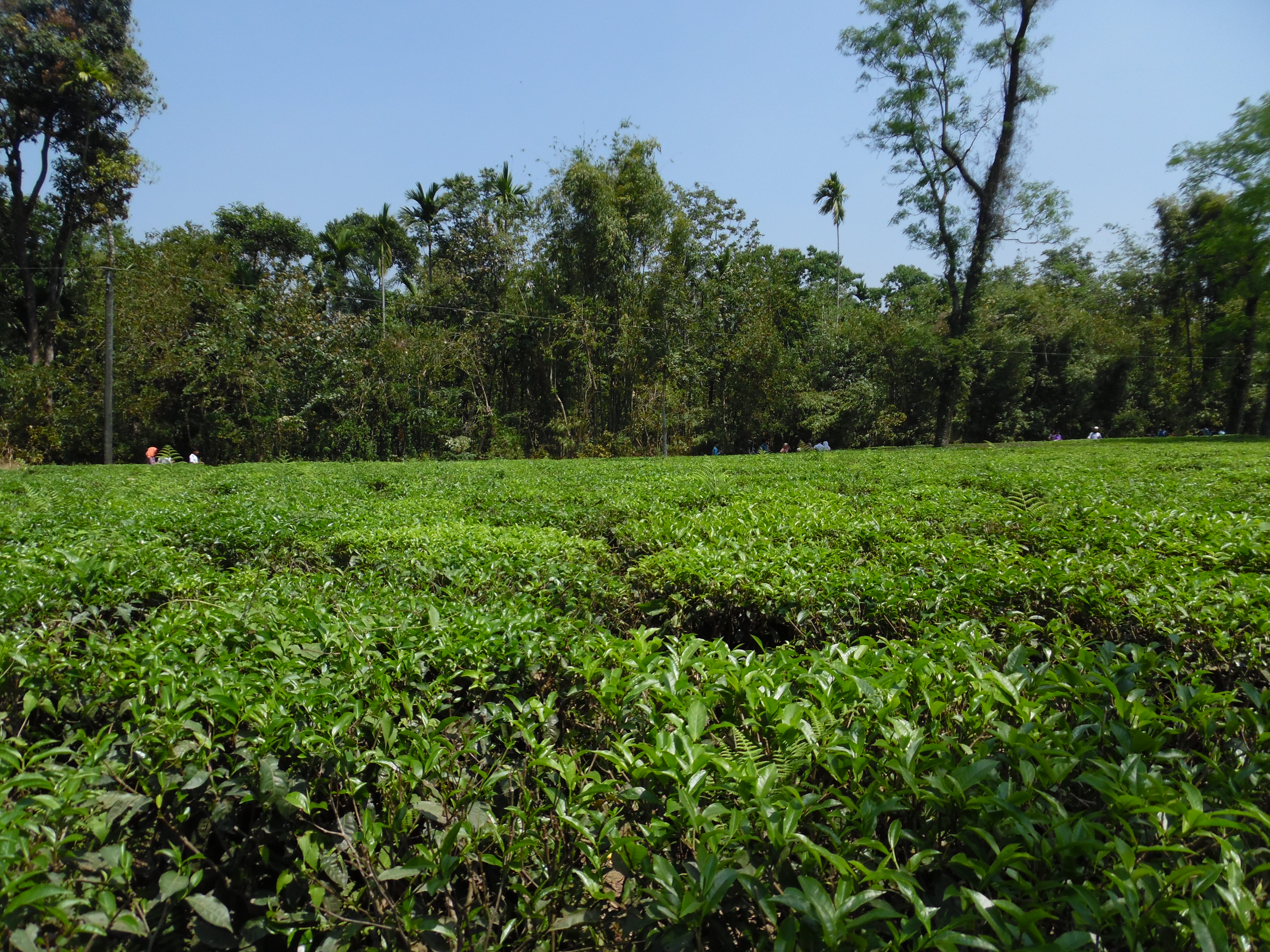
A tea garden at Sylhet.

== Administration ==
Jaintiapur Upazila falls under the 232nd constituency, Sylhet-4, and is administratively divided into six Union Parishads: Nijpat, Jaintiapur, Charikata, Darbast, Fatehpur, and Chiknagul UP. The upazila comprises 142 mouzas and 174 villages, providing a structured framework for local governance and community organization.

- Constituency: 232, Sylhet 4
- Union Parishad: 6
  - No. 1 Nijpat,
  - No. 2 Jaintiapur
  - No. 3 Charikata
  - No. 4 Darbast
  - No. 5 Fatehpur
  - No. 6 Chiknagul
- Mouzas: 142
- Villages: 174

== Infrastructure ==
Jaintiapur Upazila is characterized by a diverse range of infrastructure and public services, catering to the needs of its residents.

- Government Hospitals: 1 (Upazila Health Complex)
- Health Centers/Clinics: 18
- Post Offices: 4
- Pucca Road: 228 km
- Mud Road: 59 km
- Culverts: 99
- Bridges: 25
- Rivers: 2 (Row, Big Gang)
- Markets (Hat Bazar): 3 (Jaintiapur, Darbast, Haripur)
- Banks: 6
  - Sonali Bank Ltd.
  - Krishi Bank
  - Pubali Bank Ltd.
  - Agrani Bank Ltd.
  - Grameen Bank
  - BRAC Bank Ltd.

== Education ==
The average literacy rate in Jaintiapur Upazila stands at 35.11%, with a male literacy rate of 39.51% and a female literacy rate of 30.34%.

=== Educational institutions ===
- Colleges: 5
- Secondary Schools:
  - Government: 1
  - Private: 15
- Primary Schools:
  - Government: 41
  - Registered Private: 23
- Total Educational Institutions:
  - Colleges: 5
  - Secondary Schools: 16
  - Primary Schools: 64
  - Community Schools: 11
  - Kindergartens: 5
  - Madrasas: 23

=== Noted educational institutions ===
- Jaintia Degree College (est. 1987)
- Jaintiapur Tayob Ali Degree College (est. 1995)
- Imran Ahmad Government Women's College (est. 1999)
- Central Jaintia High School (est. 1955)
- Haripur High School (est. 1957)
- Jaintiapur Government High School (est. 1867)

== See also ==
- Jaintia Rajbari
- Upazilas of Bangladesh
- Districts of Bangladesh
- Divisions of Bangladesh
