= Jaintia Kingdom =

Former kingdom in present-day North-East India

- 500–1835
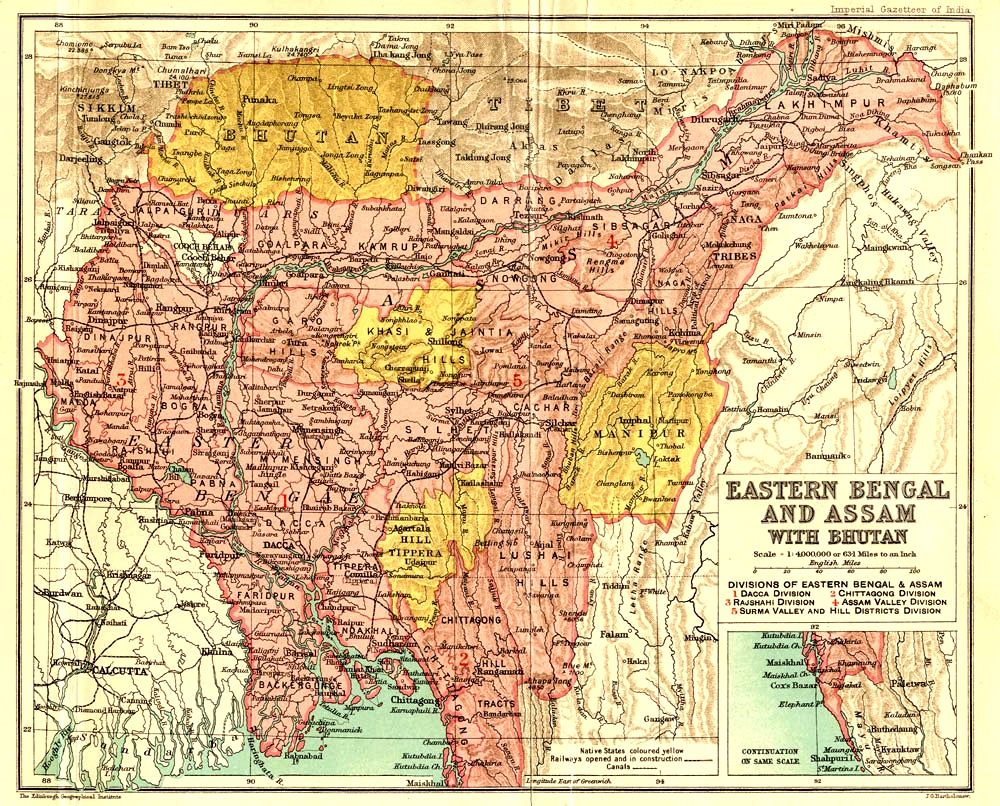
- The Khasi and Jaintia Hills in the Bengal Gazetteer of 1907
- Capital: Jaintiapur (winter); Nartiang (summer)
- Religion: Niamtre (Niam Khasi), Hinduism (royal family/elites)
- Government: Monarchy
  - 1500–1516 (first): Prabhat Ray Syiem Sutnga
  - 1832–1835 (last): Rajendra Singh Syiem Sutnga
- History
  - Established: 500
  - Disestablished: 1835
Succeeded by
Company rule in India
- Today part of: India; Bangladesh

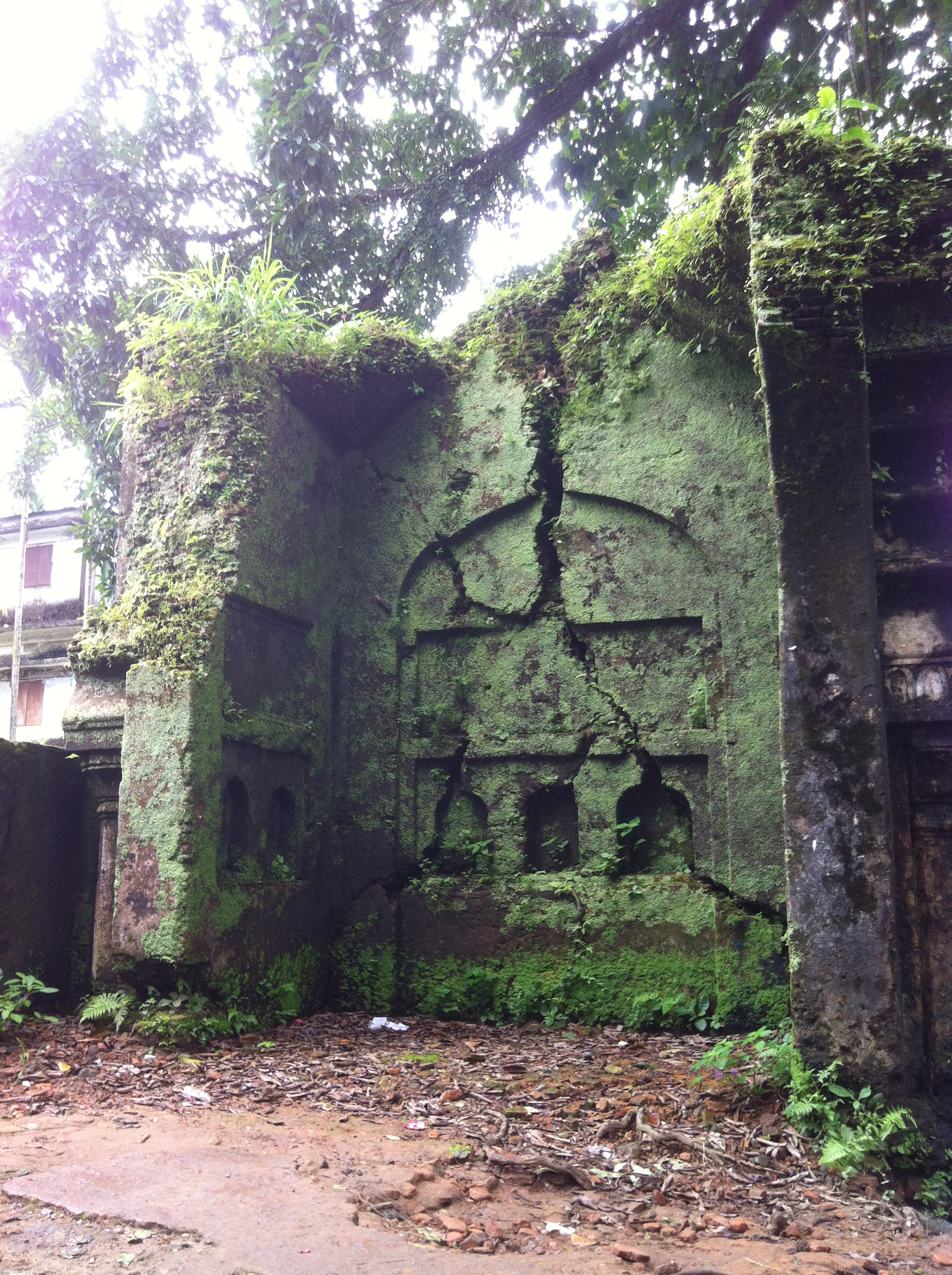
Front view of Jaintaswari House

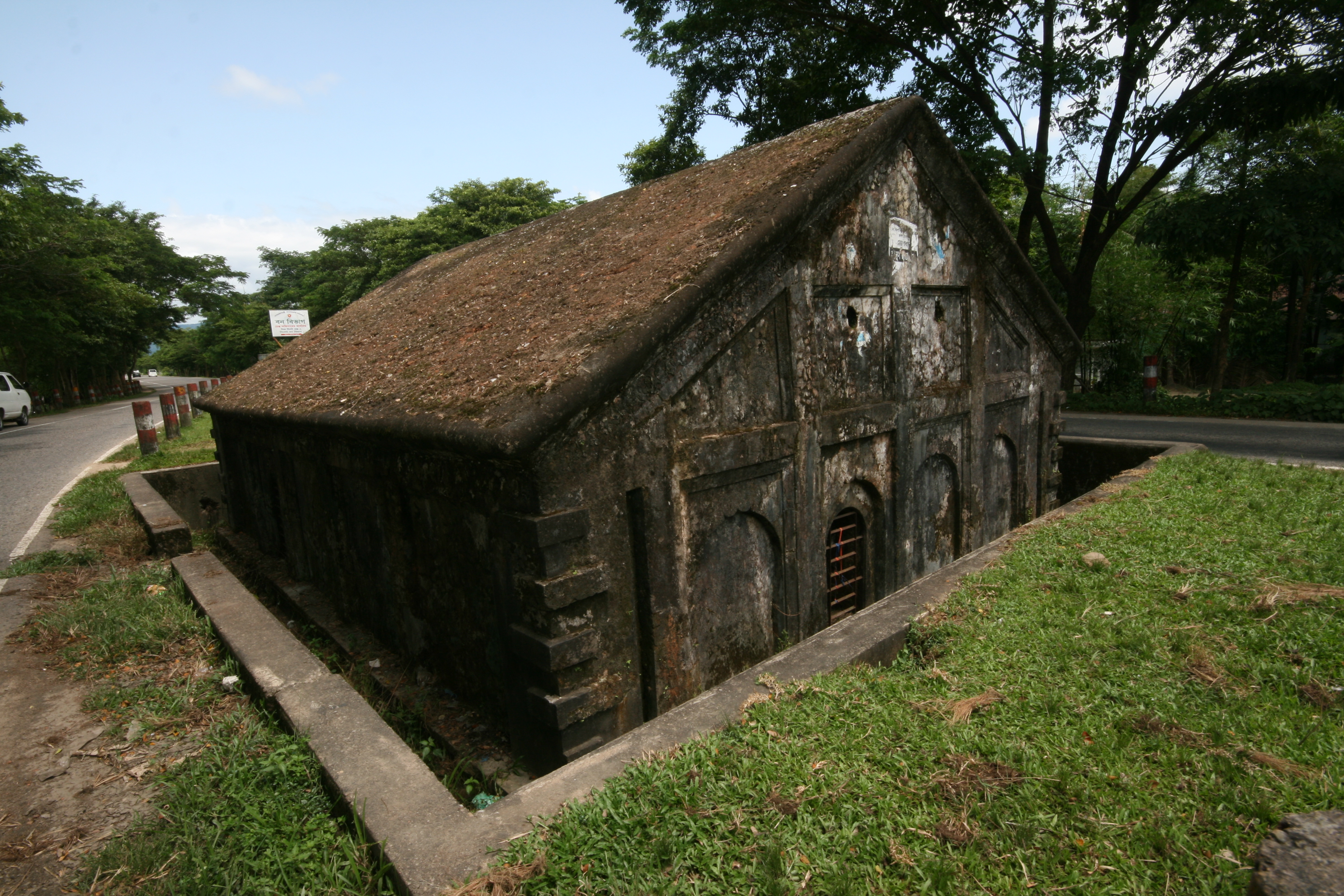
Princess Iravati's inn

The Jaintia Kingdom was a kingdom in some parts of present-day Bangladesh's Sylhet Division and India's Meghalaya state. It was partitioned into three in 630 AD by Raja Guhak for his three sons, into the Jaintia Kingdom, Gour Kingdom and Laur Kingdom. It was annexed by the British East India Company in 1835. All the Pnar Rajahs of the Jaintia Kingdom are from the Syiem Sutnga clan, which is from a Pnar tribe which claims descent from Ka Li Dohkha, a divine nymph.

== Etymology ==
One theory says that the word "Jaintia" is derived the shrine of Jayanti Devi or Jainteswari, an incarnation of the Hindu goddess Durga. Another theory says that the name is derived via Pnar (the language of the rulers) from Sutnga, a settlement in the modern day Jaintia Hills of Meghalaya. The Pnars (also called Jaintia) and War, speak Mon-Khmer languages that are related to Khasi. But many scholars belief that the Goddess Jayanti Devi was named after the people, Then later it was named after Kingdom of these Jaintia People, and in modern context due to its Cultural and Historical significance, The government of India, Recognised the Uniqueness of the Jaintia people and hence was recognised Under the Scheduled Tribes and was Given a separate district and District Council (JHADC) under the 6th Schedule and Traditional Administration was recognised in the Constitution of India, Where the Chiefs reign hand in hand with District Administration, no one can buy and register land holdings without the Chief permission.The Election of the Chief Dalloi was recorded to be the first instance of Democratic Election. Due to differences in opinions and fights over land, These Chiefs Together make a Confederacy to elect a ruler, and hence, the ruler was chosen from the Sutnga clan, the chief was very powerful and continue to ruled in the plains, so the Rajah could not get direct control over the hills, and expand towards the Sylhet and the Khasi hills was left untouched due to High terrain and cultivation and trade was more profitable in the plains than in the Hills.

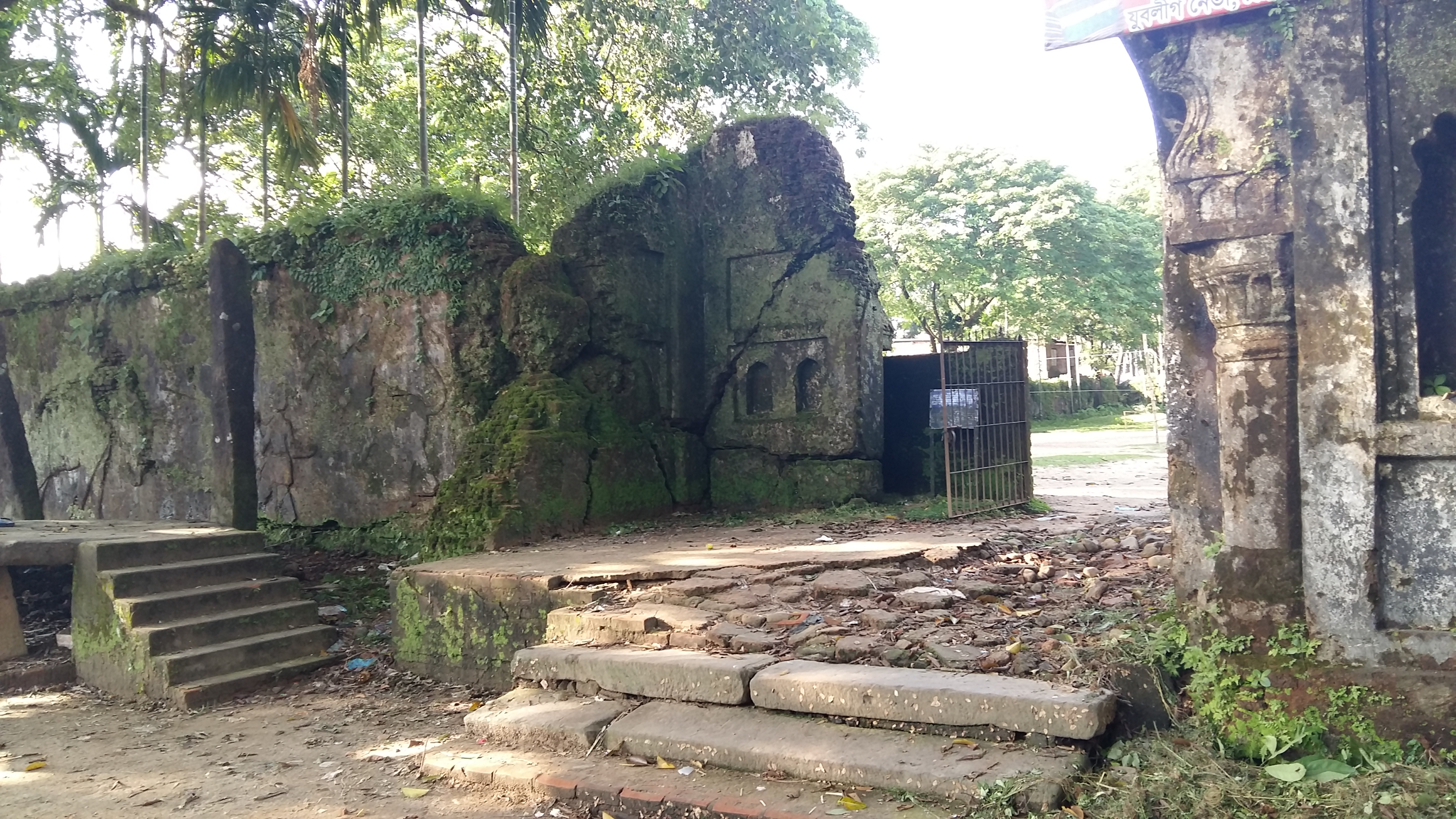
Entrance to the Jaintaswari House.

== Extent ==
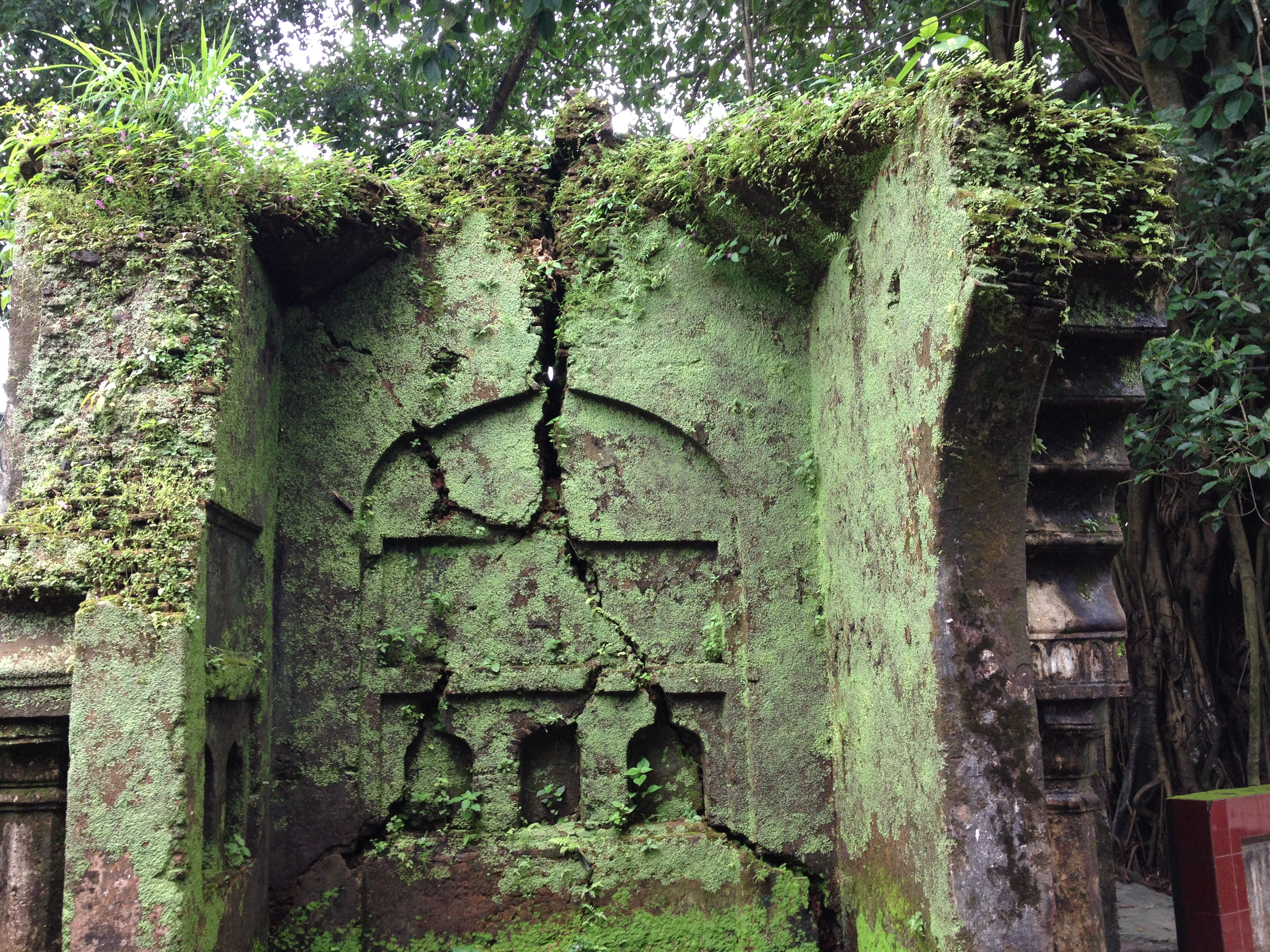
Jaintaswari Front Wall

The Jaintia Kingdom extended from the east of the Shillong Plateau of present-day Meghalaya in north-east India, into the plains to the south, and north to the Barak River valley in Assam, India. The winter capital located at Jaintia Rajbari, Jaintiapur, now ruined, was located on the plains at the foot of the Jaintia Hills; it appears there may have been a summer capital at Nartiang in the Jaintia Hills, but little remains of it now apart from the Nartiang Durga Temple and a nearby site with many megalithic structures. Much of what is today the Sylhet region of Bangladesh and India was at one time under the jurisdiction of the Jaintia king.

== History ==
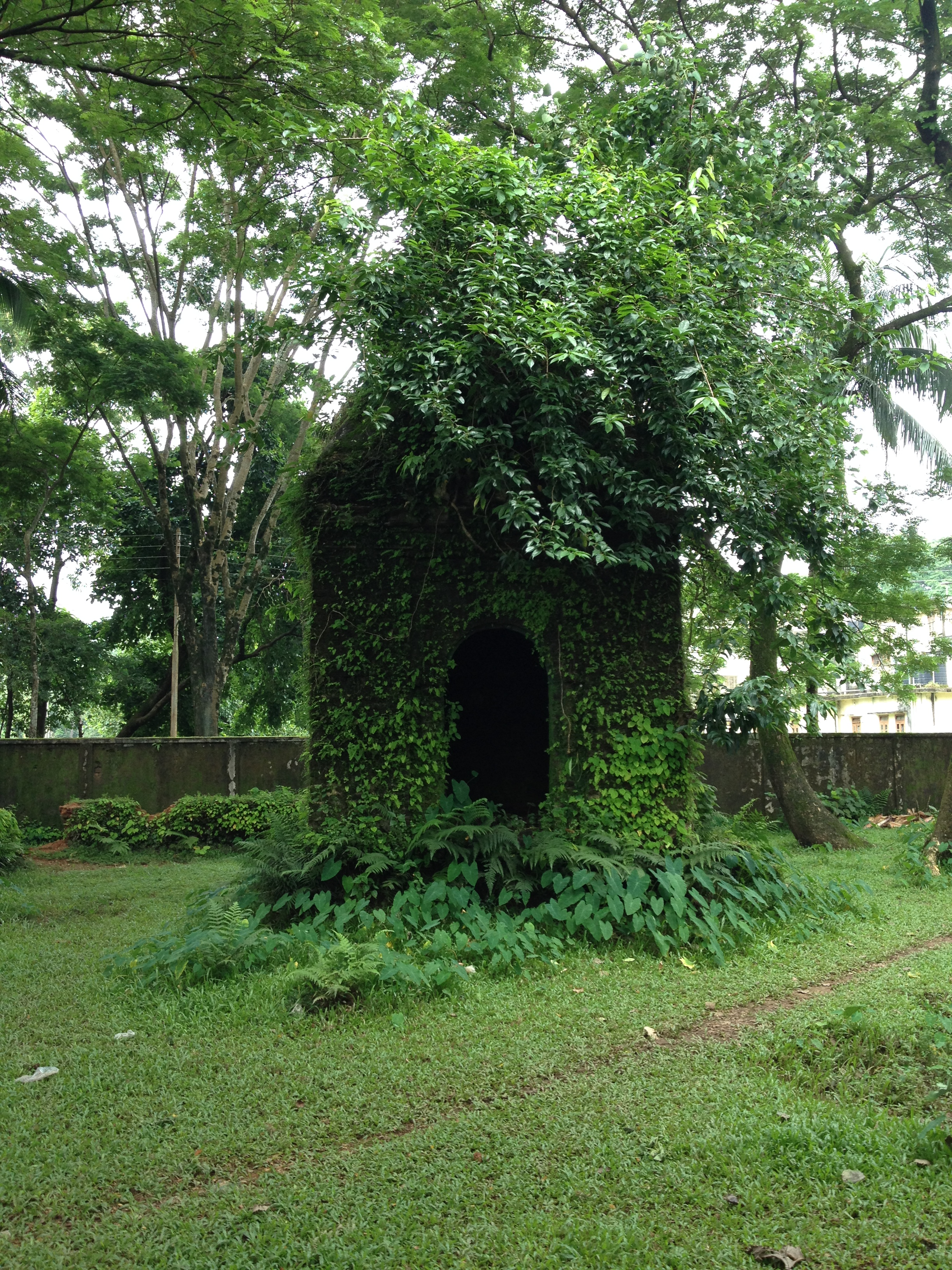
Peculiar building in Jaintiaswari Estate.

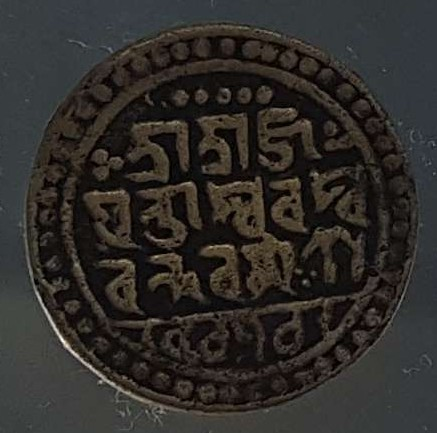
Silver Tanka of the Jaintia kingdom, Jayantiapur mint.

In ancient times, Austroasiatic tribal migrations from Southeast Asia during the Holocene period to what is now known as the Khasi and Jaintia Hills. The tribe split into two; modern-day Khasi which was the religious class, and the modern-day Pnar which were the ruling class. According to the legend constructed by the Brahmin pandits, the hero of Hindu mythology, Arjuna travelled to the Jaintia to regain his horse held captive by a princess, a story mentioned in a Purana or Hindu epic known as the Mahabharata.

The earliest known ruler, Ka Urmi Rani, married Sindhu Rai who was the ambassador to Kamarupa. They had a daughter called Ka Urvara who married Krishak, another Kamarupi ambassador. Krishak claimed he was of the lunar dynasty and descended from Parikshit, as he was the offspring of a Kachari damsel. Other sources claim Krishak was a prince of the Tibetan kingdom of Hotik. Krishak changed the inheritance law from youngest daughter to eldest son. This angered the King of Kamarupa who summoned him to his land never letting him return to Jaintia hills again. After the death of his mother, Krishak's son Hatak took over the throne.

When Guhak ascended the Jaintia throne in 600 AD and married a princess from Kamarupa, just like his father Hatak. Guhak had a deep interest in Hinduism and migration of Brahmins from the Kamrup region to this area took place. On his way back, Guhak brought a stone image known as Kangsa-Nisudhana, an image of Krishna and Balaram murdering Kamsa, as well as Grivakali and Janghakali, and they put it on top of a hill in modern-day where they would worship it. During the British colonial period, this hill was also home to the Civil Surgeon's Bungalow.

Guhak had three sons; Jayantak, Gurak and Ladduk, and two daughters; Sheela and Chatala. It is said that his eldest daughter, Sheela, was once bathing in a lake south of the Kangsa-Nisudhana hill (which became the hillock of the Civil Surgeon's Bungalow during British rule) and she was kidnapped. After being rescued by Guhak, Sheela started to become more religious and live a secluded life. Chatala indulged herself in an unlawful relationship with one of the palace servants, leading to her being disowned and dumped in a distant island in the middle of 2000 square mile lake to the south of the kingdom. After Sheela's death at a young age, Guhak gave up his kingdom to also lead a more ascetic life. This port-area around the lake, which was the largest centre in the Jaintia Kingdom for trade, was named Sheela haat (or Sheela's marketplace) in her honour. Sources such as the Hattanath Tales mention Sheelachatal was named after both daughters for the region. This is one of many theories of how Sylhet got its name. Xuanzang of China mentions that he visited Sheelachatal in the 630s in his book, the Great Tang Records on the Western Regions. He split the Jaintia Kingdom into three for his three sons. He gave his eldest son, Jayantak, the northern hills which remained known as the Jaintia Kingdom. He gave his second son, Gurak, the southern plains which would be named Gour Kingdom, and he gave his third son, Luddak, the western plains which would become the Laur Kingdom.

=== Partitioned Jaintia ===
Jayantak built his own Kamakhya Bama Jangha Pitha temple in the southeast of his kingdom on top of a hill near modern-day Kanaighat. It supposedly contained the left thigh of a Hindu goddess. He had a son called Yang who he dedicated the Phaljur area to. In modern times, there is a hill in the village of Baildara that continues to be known as Yang Rajar Tila (King Yang's hillock). The locals of this village continue to share a legend about how Yang, after being questioned for always leaving the palace by his wife, transformed his queen into a cursed bird which is still alive and inhabits the region as a sign of bad luck.

Jayantak's heir, Joymalla is remembered as an athletic ruler. There are legends of him allowing an elephant to walk over his chest. He is said to have been killed after attempting to fight a rhinoceros. He was succeeded by his son, Mahabal, and then his grandson, Bancharu. Bancharu was interested in cultivation, and planted many trees and increased production of honey, tejpata, orange and agarwood. During his reign, Buddhist merchants came to this region through Sylhet. They promoted Tantric Buddhism and Bancharu gained an interest in it. Bancharu also began the practice of sacrificing humans at Jangha Kali, which would continue for centuries in Jaintia up until British rule. Bancharu was succeeded by Kamadeva, a Sanskrit enthusiast who was close friends with Bhoja Varma Deva, a Sanskrit pandit from East Bengal. In 1090 AD, a Vijay Raghabia was composed in honour of Raja Kamadeva.

Kamadeva was succeeded by his son Bhimbal. Bhimbal could not rule properly due to insurgencies amongst the hill rulers of the region. Jaintia was defeated in a battle and Bhimbal was either murdered or fled his kingdom out of disgrace. His minister, Kedareswar Rai, took over and began the Brahmin ruling dynasty of Jaintia.

=== New dynasty ===
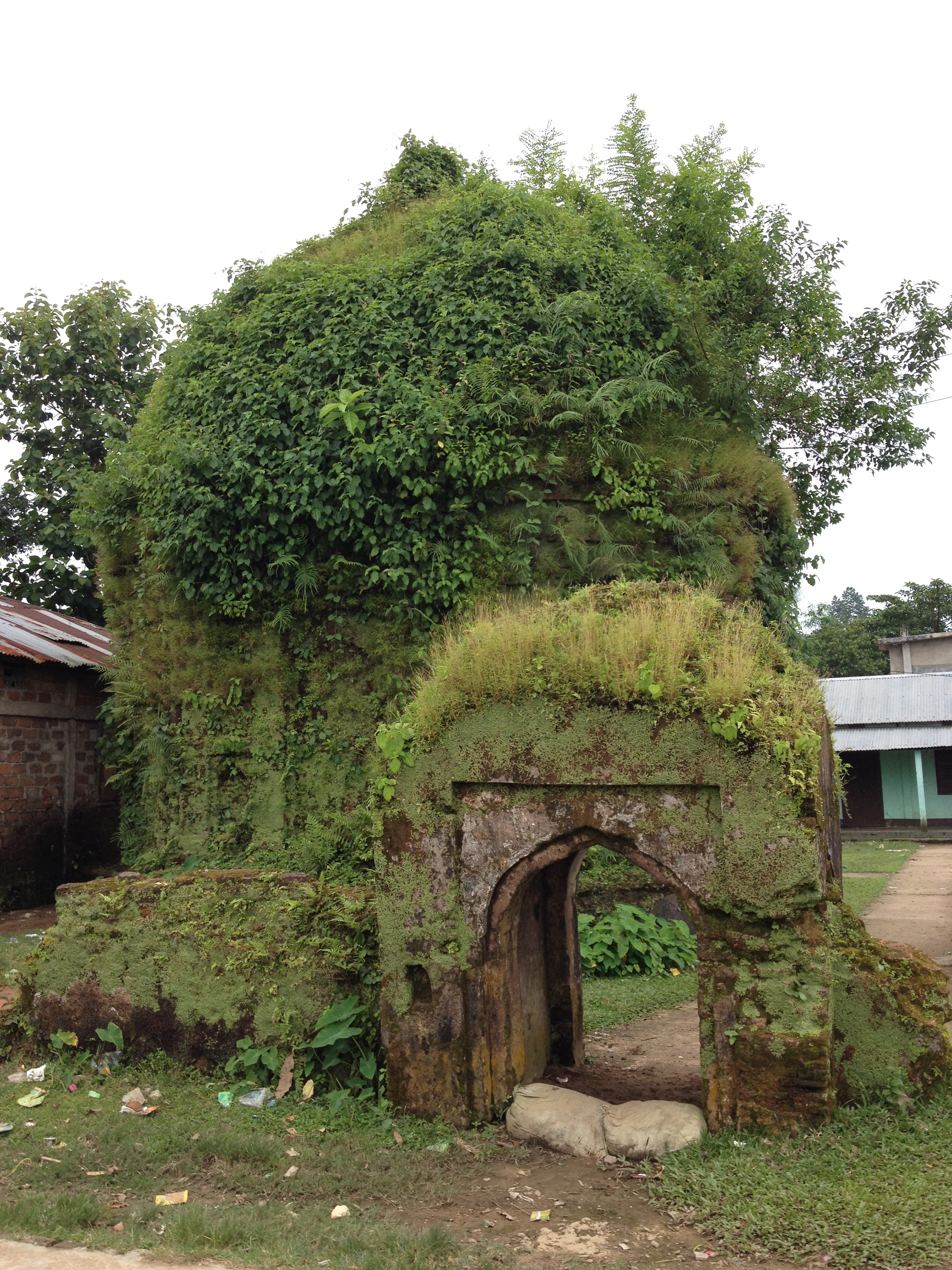
Stone structures in the Jaintaswari Estate.

In 1618, Dhan Manik conquered Dimarua leading to a war with Maibong Raja Yasho Narayan Satrudaman of the Kachari Kingdom. Dhan Manik, realising that he would need assistance, gave his daughter in hand to Raja Susenghphaa of the Ahom kingdom. The Ahoms then fought the Kachari allowing an easy escape for Dhan Manik and the Jaintians.

Sometime after 1676, the Raja of Jaintia attempted to rebel against the Mughal Empire. The Akhbarats note that the Raja had gathered 1500 infantry and began plundering the nearby region and led a siege against the fort in Sylhet. In response, the Mughals sent the general, Shaista Khan, the nobleman; Iradat Khan and Raja Tahawar Singh (also known as Kunwar Tahawurr Asad) of Kharagpur Raj in Bihar. Together, they were able to defeat the Jaintia Raja and bring the kingdom back under imperial control.

=== Subjugation under Ahoms ===
In 1707, Jaintia king Ram Singh kidnapped the Kachari Raja. The Raja of Cachar then informed Ahom Raja Rudra Singh Sukhrungphaa which led to the Ahoms attack through North Cachar and Jaintia Hills. Jaintia was annexed to the Ahoms and its capital city, Jaintiapur, was then raided by the Ahoms and thousands of innocent civilians were put to death or ears and noses were cut off. Sukhrungphaa then informed the Faujdar of Sylhet that Jaintia was under his rule and that it is him that they will trade to. However, the Ahom rule in Jaintia was weak and short-lived. The Jaintias rebelled in their own land defeating the Ahom soldiers. Ram Singh, however, died as a captive to the Ahoms and his son, Jayo Narayan took over the Jaintia Kingdom.

In 1757, the Nongkrem-Khynriam Khasi chief closed the Sonapur Duar, stopping trade between the Jaintia and Ahom kingdoms. An envoy of Jaintias assembled at Hajo where they informed the incident to Ahom Raja Suremphaa Swargadeo Rajeswar Singh who re-opened it for them.

The British came into contact with the Jaintia kingdom upon receiving the Diwani of Bengal in 1765. Jaintiapur, currently in Bangladesh, was the capital. The kingdom extended from the hills into the plains north of the Barak River Major Henniker led the first expedition to Jaintia in 1774. The quarries in their possession were the chief supplier of lime to the delta region of Bengal, but with the British, the contact was not very smooth, and they were attacked in the same year. Subsequently, the Jaintias were increasingly isolated from the plains via a system of forts as well as via regulation of 1799.

=== End ===
In 1821, a group of Jaintias kidnapped British subjects attempting to sacrifice them to Kali. A culprit was then found by the British who admitted that it was an annual tradition which the Jaintias have been doing for 10 years. The priest would cut off the victim's throat and then the Jaintia princess would bathe in his blood. The Jaintia believed that this would bless the princess with offspring. Upon hearing this, the British threatened the Jaintia Raja that they would invade his territories if this does not stop. The Raja made an agreement in 1824 with David Scott that they will only negotiate with the British. A year later, the Jaintias attempted to continue their annual sacrifice which they had previously agreed with the British that they would stop.

After the conclusion of the First Anglo-Burmese War, the British allowed the Jaintia king his rule north of the Surma River. The Jaintias kidnapped four British men in 1832. Three were sacrificed in the Great Hindu temple in Faljur, with one escaping and informing the British authorities of the atrocities. After the Jaintia Raja declined to find the culprits, the British finally marched to the Jaintia Kingdom and annexed it on 15 March 1835 The king was handed over his property in Sylhet along with a monthly salary of Rs 500. The British administered the plain areas directly and the hill region indirectly via a system of fifteen dolois and four sardars. The fifteen administrators were free to adjudicate on all but the most heinous crimes.

Jaintia continued to exist though divided into pargana or fiscal division, within greater Sylhet such as the Jaintia Puriraj (Jaintiapuri Raj) pargana, Japhlang pargana, Chairkata pargana and Phaljur pargana. Puriraj had an area of 59.15 square metres and had a land revenue of £325 of 1875. Phaljur was 51.84 sqm and had a land revenue of £301. Chairkata was 37.88 square metres, consisted of 749 estates and land revenue of £276. Japhlang was 40.07 square metres, 342 estates and £279 land revenue.

== Rulers ==
=== Old dynasty (??-630) ===
1. Urmi Rani (?-550)
2. Krishak Pator (550–570)
3. Hatak (570–600)
4. Guhak (600–630)

=== Partitioned Jaintia (630-1120) ===
1. Jayanta (630–660)
2. Joymalla (660-?)
3. Mahabal (?)
4. Bancharu (?-1100)
5. Kamadeva (1100–1120)
6. Bhimbal (1120)

=== Brahmin dynasty (1120-??) ===
1. Kedareshwar Rai (1120–1130)
2. Dhaneshwar Rai (1130–1150)
3. Kandarpa Rai (1150–1170)
4. Manik Rai (1170–1193)
5. Jayanta Rai (1193–1210)
6. Jayanti Devi
7. Bara Gossain

=== New dynasty (1500-1835) ===
1. Prabhat Ray Syiem Sutnga (1500–1516)
2. Maju-Gohain Syiem Sutnga (1516–1532)
3. Burha Parbat Ray Syiem Sutnga (1532–1548)
4. Borgohain Syiem Sutnga I (1548–1564)
5. Bijay Manik Syiem Sutnga (1564–1580)
6. Pratap Ray Syiem Sutnga (1580–1596)
7. Dhan Manik Syiem Sutnga (1596–1612)
8. Jasa Manik Syiem Sutnga (1612–1625)
9. Sundar Ray Syiem Sutnga (1625–1636)
10. Chota Parbat Ray Syiem Sutnga (1636–1647)
11. Jasamanta Ray Syiem Sutnga (1647–1660)
12. Ban Singh Syiem Sutnga (1660–1669)
13. Pratap Singh Syiem Sutnga (1669–1678)
14. Lakshmi Narayan Syiem Sutnga (1678–1694)
15. Ram Singh Syiem Sutnga I (1694–1708)
16. Jay Narayan Syiem Sutnga (1708–1731)
17. Borgohain Syiem Sutnga II (1731–1770)
18. Chattra Singh Syiem Sutnga (1770–1780)
19. Yatra Narayan Syiem Sutnga (1780–1785)
20. Bijay Narayan Syiem Sutnga (1785–1786)
21. Lakshmi Singh Syiem Sutnga (1786–1790)
22. Ram Singh Syiem Sutnga II (1790–1832)
23. Rajendra Singh Syiem Sutnga (1832–1835)
