= Islam in Bangladesh =

Bangladeshi Muslims Bāṅlādēśī Musôlmān বাংলাদেশী মুসলমান

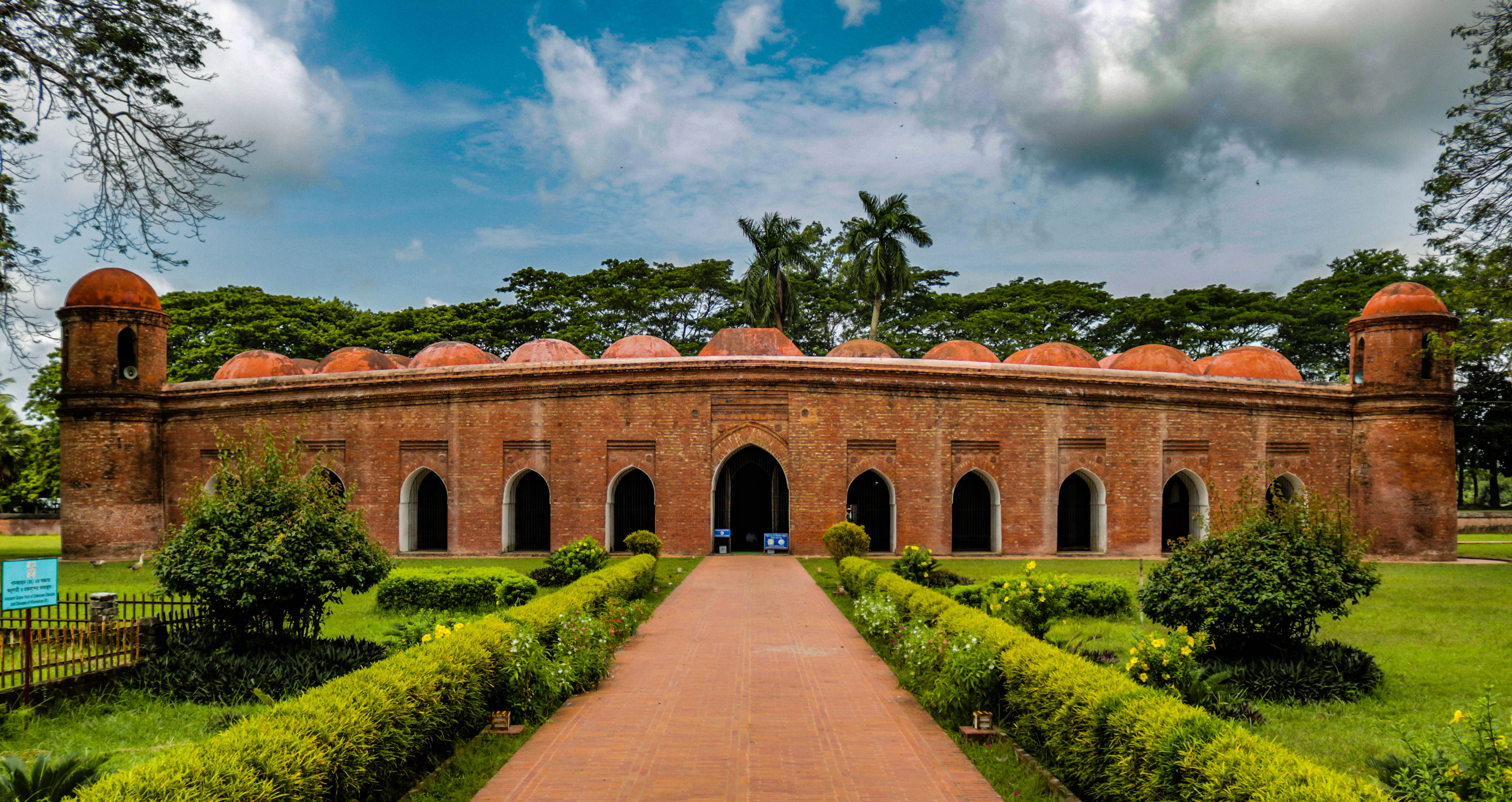
- Sixty Dome Mosque, a UNESCO World Heritage Site in the historic Mosque City of Bagerhat

Total population
- ~160 million (2025 est.) (Note: 2022 census & 2025 IMF Report); 150,360,405 (2022 census) ▲ (91.04% of the country's population) ▲ ~175 million (including diaspora)

Regions with significant populations
- Throughout Bangladesh
- Dhaka Division: 41,300,000 (93.35%)
- Chittagong Division: 30,000,000 (90.11%)
- Rajshahi Division: 19,500,000 (93.67%)
- Khulna Division: 15,700,000 (88.18%)
- Rangpur Division: 15,600,000 (86.41%)
- Mymensingh Division: 12,075,000 (95.54%)
- Sylhet Division: 9,500,000 (86.17%)
- Barisal Division: 8,500,000 (91.52%)

Religions
- Predominantly Sunni Islam; Alongside Shia, Ahmadiyya, Quranist and Nondenominational minorities

Languages
- Bengali

Website
- islamicfoundation.gov.bd

Islam is the largest and the state religion of the People's Republic of Bangladesh. According to the 2022 census, Bangladesh had a population of about 150 million Muslims, or 91.04% of its total population of 165 million.

Islam arrived in modern-day Bangladesh in the late 7th century, when Arab Muslims established commercial as well as religious connection in the region of Bengal, mainly through the coastal regions as traders and primarily via the ports of Chittagong. In the early 13th century, Muhammad bin Bakhtiyar Khalji conquered Western and part of Northern Bengal, establishing the first Muslim kingdom in Bengal. During the 13th century, Sufi missionaries, mystics and saints began to preach Islam in villages.

The Bengal region emerged as a supreme power of the medieval Islamic East. The Bengal Sultanate united Bengal on an ethno-linguistic platform, and the region reached in her golden age. Later on, Mughal Bengal became increasingly independent under the Nawabs in the 18th century. Muslim nationalism rose during British rule which ultimately led to the establishment of East Pakistan in 1947. Following the 1971 Liberation War, East Pakistan seceded from Pakistan and modern Bangladesh was established. Founded as a constitutionally secular state, Islam was declared as the state religion of Bangladesh in 1988. However, Bangladesh remains a de facto secular country.

Muslims of Bangladesh are predominant native Bengali Muslims. The majority of Bangladeshis are Sunni, and follow the Hanafi school of thought and fiqh. Minority denominations include Shi'ism and Ahmadiyya. Bangladesh also has a firmly rooted Sufi tradition, which played pivotal role in the Islamic conversion of the country. Islam constitutes a major component of the Culture of Bangladesh, influencing education, architecture, clothing, sculpture, theatre, music and festivals. Bangladeshi Muslims have retained and integrated many indigenous elements and cultural practices upon the spread of Islam.

Islamic affairs in the country (such as Hajj and Zakat) are regulated by the Ministry of Religious Affairs and Islamic Foundation Bangladesh. Sharia is only leagally applied in personal affairs (such as marriage and inheritance) through British era legal codes.

== History ==
=== Early explorers ===
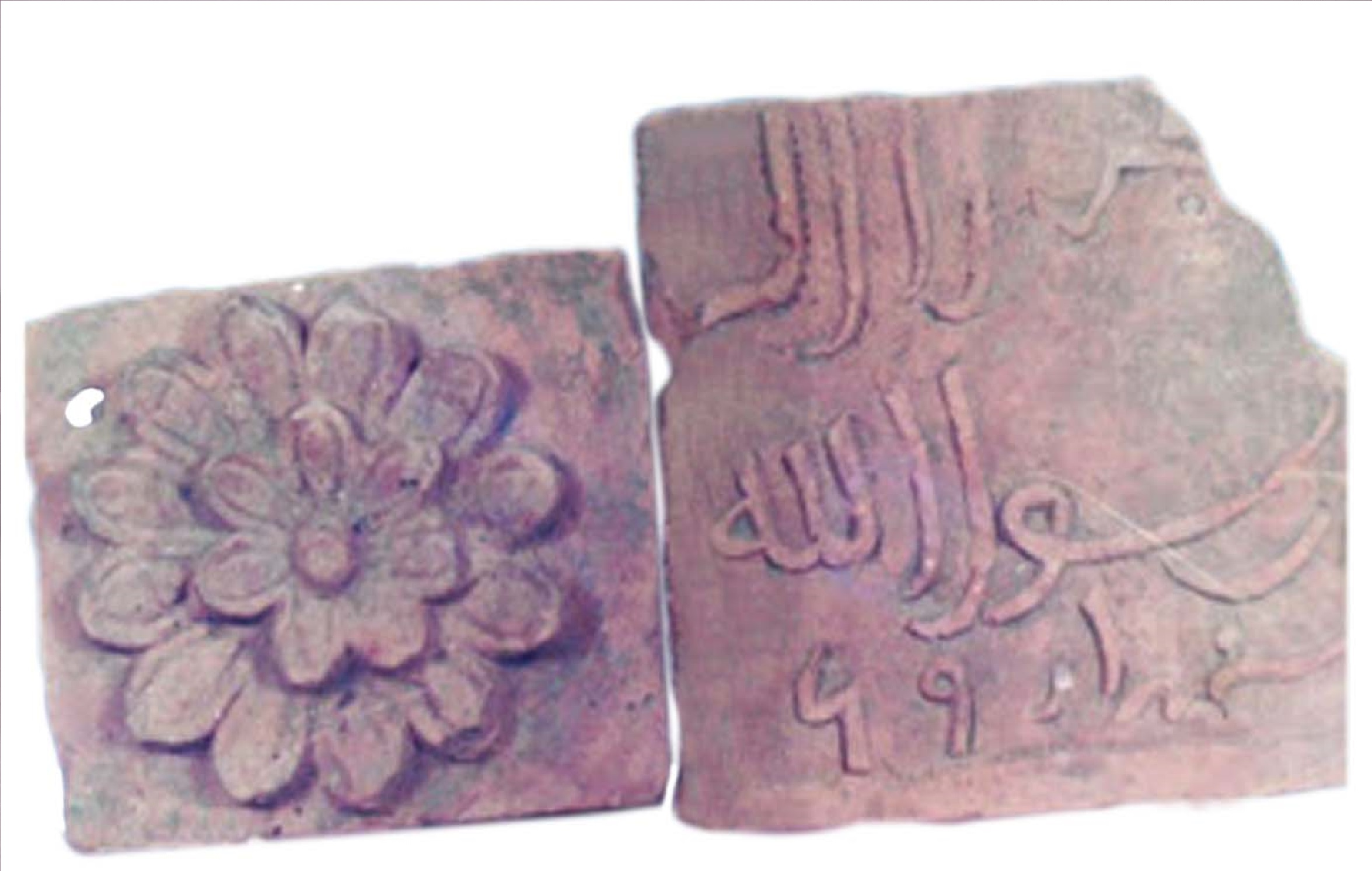
Terracotta inscriptions from the Lost Mosque of Lalmonirhat indicating 69 AH (690 AD), possibly making it the oldest mosque of South Asia

One of the earliest mosques in South Asia is under excavation in northern Bangladesh, indicating the presence of Muslims in the area around the lifetime of Muhammad. By the 9th century, Muslim merchants had increased trade with Bengali seaports, introducing Islam to the region. Coins from the Abbasid era have been discovered across Bengal, further evidencing this connection. Additional evidence of these early Arab traders includes inscriptions found near the Meghna River close to Sandwip on the Bay of Bengal. Arab writers of the time also mentioned the kingdoms of Samrup and Rumi, the latter being identified with the empire of Dharmapala of the Pala Empire.

In the 10th century, Samatata, located in southeastern Bengal, was home to a diverse population with various religious backgrounds. During this period, the Arab geographer Al-Masudi visited the region and documented a thriving Muslim community in his work The Meadows of Gold. Islam first appeared in Bengal during Pala dynasty's rule, as a result of increased trade between Bengal and the Arab Abbasid Caliphate, facilitating the presence of Arab traders along the coast of Bengal which includes Port of Chittagong.

In addition to trade, Islam was also being introduced to the people of Bengal through the migration of Sufi missionaries prior to conquests. The earliest known Sufi missionaries were Syed Shah Surkhul Antia and his students, most notably Shah Sultan Rumi, in the 11th century. Rumi settled in present-day Netrokona, Mymensingh where he influenced the local ruler and population to embrace Islam.

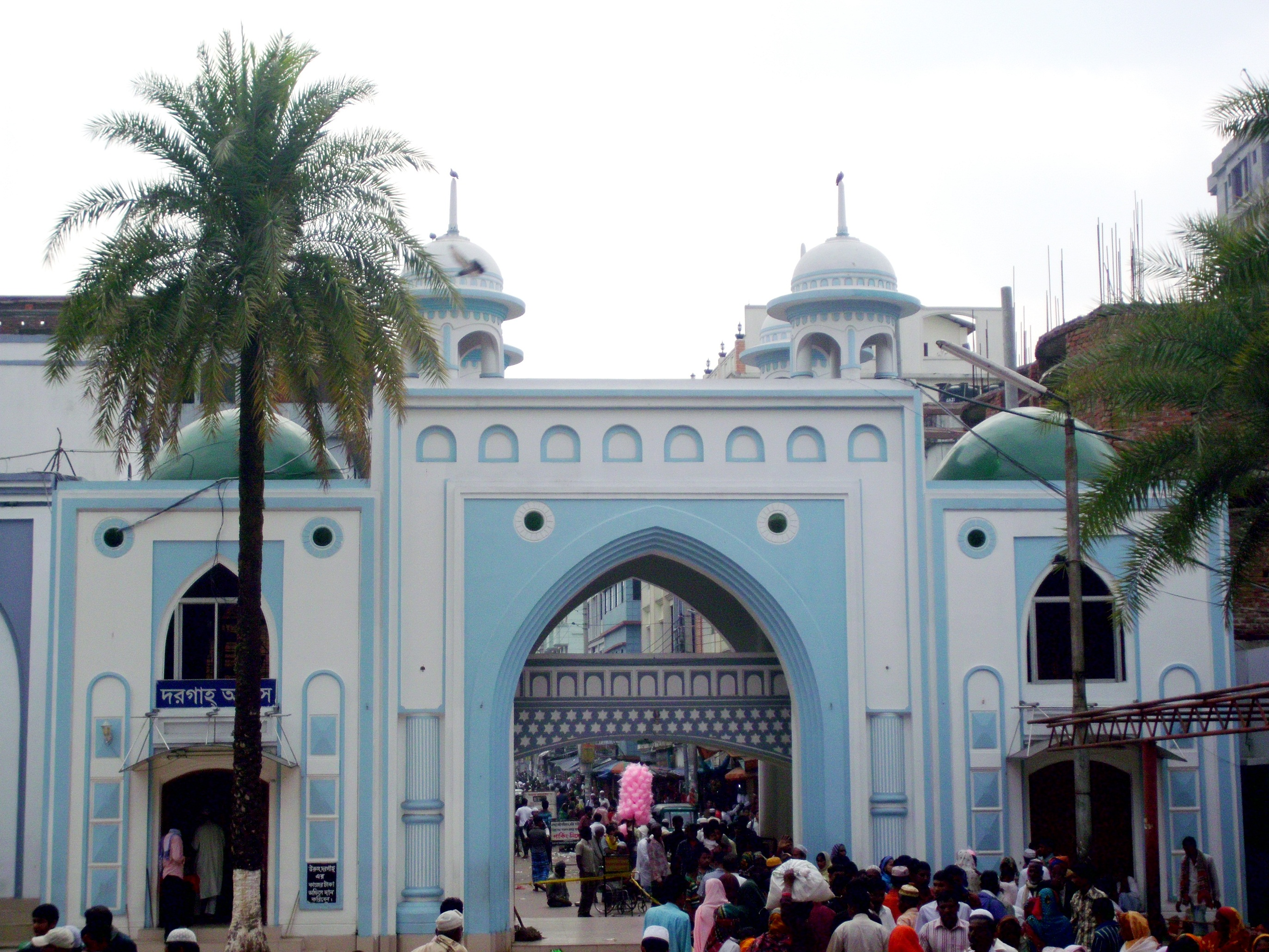
Shrine of Shah Jalal at Sylhet, a Sufi saint who led the Muslim conquest of Sylhet in 14th century

The first Muslim conquest of Bengal was undertaken by the forces of General Bakhtiyar Khilji in the thirteenth century. This opened the doors for Muslim influence in the region for hundreds of years up until the present-day. Many of the people of Bengal began accepting Islam through the influx of missionaries following this conquest. Sultan Balkhi and Shah Makhdum Rupos settled in the present-day Rajshahi Division in northern Bengal, preaching to the communities there. Numerous small sultanates emerged in the region. During the reign of the Sultan of Lakhnauti Shamsuddin Firuz Shah, much of present-day Satgaon, Sonargaon and Mymensingh came under Muslim dominion. A community of 13 Muslim families headed by Burhanuddin resided in the northeastern city of Srihatta (Sylhet), claiming their descendants to have arrived from Chittagong. Srihatta (Sylhet) was ruled by an oppressive king called Gour Govinda. After being informed of Raja Gour Govinda's oppressive regime in Sylhet, Firuz Shah sent numerous forces led by his nephew Sikandar Khan Ghazi and subsequently his military commander-in-chief Syed Nasiruddin to conquer Sylhet. By 1303, over three hundred Sufi preachers led by Shah Jalal aided the conquest and confirmed a victory. Following the conquest, Jalal disseminated his followers across different parts of Bengal to spread Islam. Jalal is now a household name among Muslims in Bangladesh.

=== Sultanate of Bengal ===
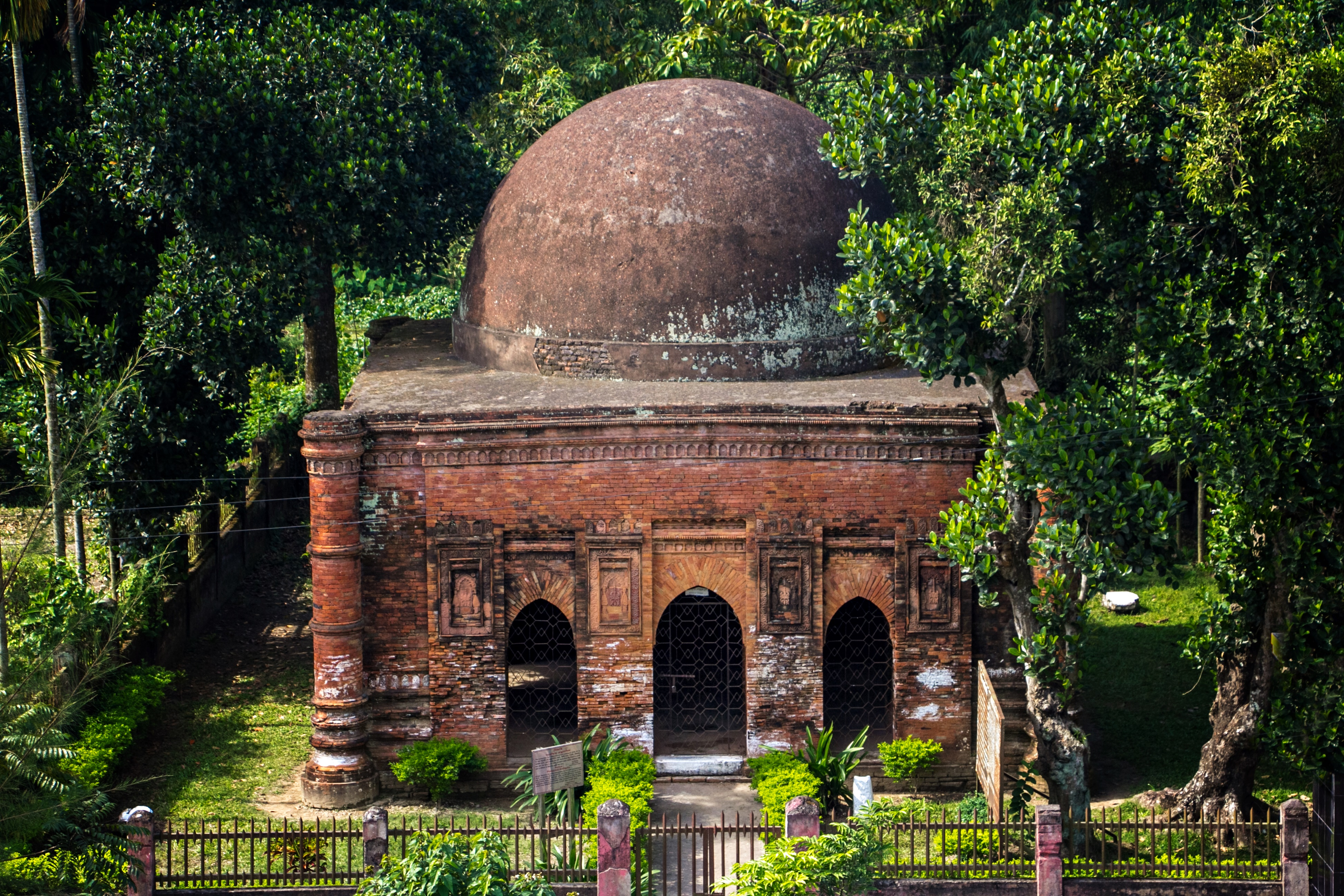
Goaldi Mosque at Sonargaon, the royal capital of the Bengal Sultanate

During the Sultanate period, a syncretic belief system arose due to mass conversions. As a result, the Islamic concept of tawhid (the oneness of God) was diluted into the veneration of saints or pirs. Deities such as Shitala (goddess of smallpox), Olabibi (goddess of cholera) and Manasa (goddess of snakes) became venerated as pirs.

=== Under Mughal Empire ===
In pre-Mughal times, there is less evidence for widespread adoption of Islam in what is now Bangladesh. What mention of Muslims there was usually in reference to an urban elite. Ibn Battuta met with Shah Jalal in Sylhet and noted the inhabitants of the plains were still Hindu. In 1591, Venetian traveller Cesare Federici mentioned Sondwip near Chittagong as having an entirely Muslim population. The seventeenth century European travellers generally understood Islam as being implanted after the Mughal conquest.

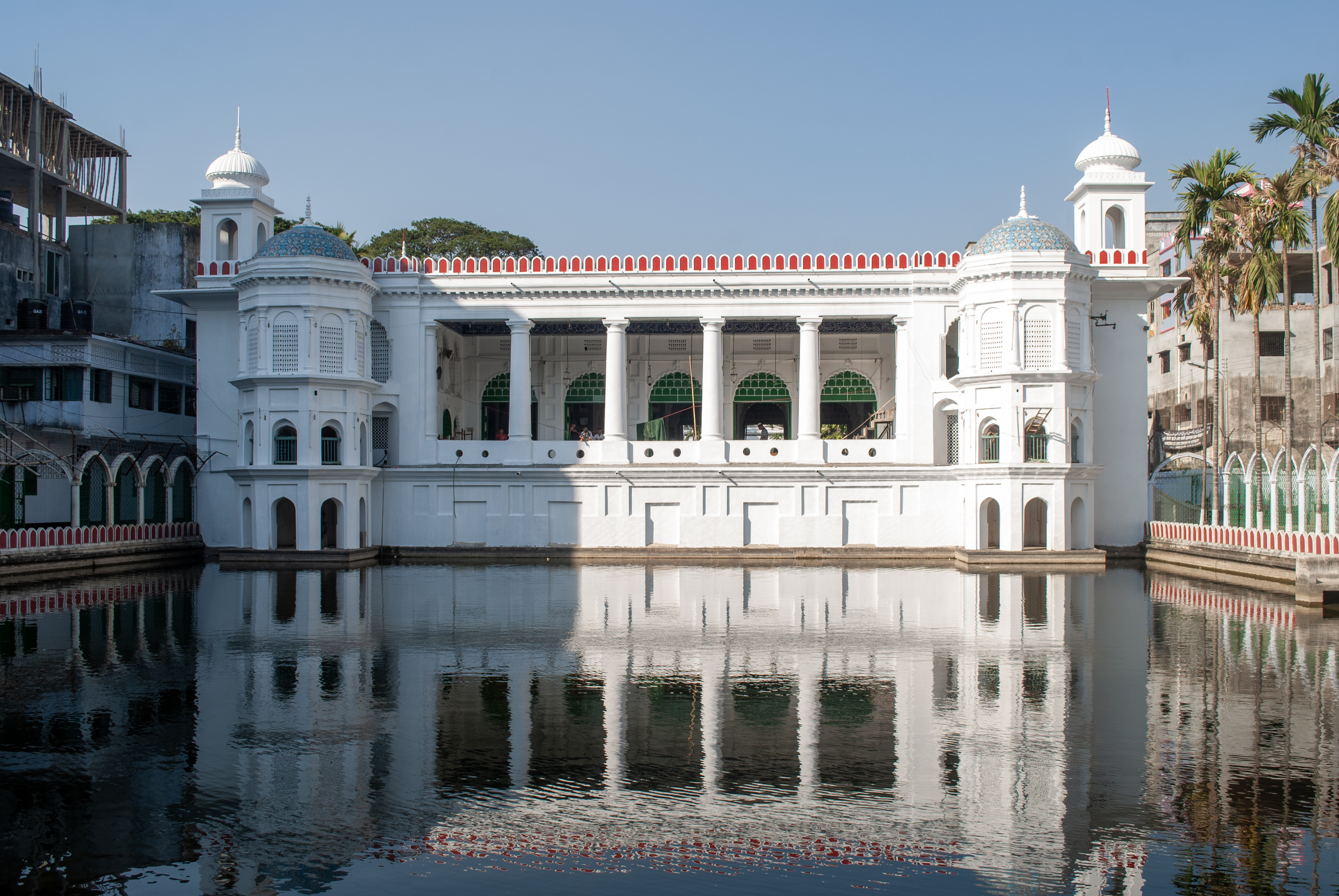
Hussaini Dalan, largest Shia Imambara in Bangladesh, built during the Mughal period

During the Mughal Empire, much of the region of what is now East Bengal was still heavily forested, but highly fertile. The Mughals incentivised the bringing of this land under cultivation, and so peasants were incentivised to bring the land under cultivation. These peasants were primarily led by Muslim leaders and so Islam became the main religion in the delta. Most of the Zamindars in the modern Barisal division, for instance, were upper caste Hindus who subcontracted actual jungle clearance work to a Muslim pir. In other instances, pirs themselves would organise the locals to clear the jungle and then contact the Mughals to gain legitimacy. In other instances, such as the densely forested interior of Chittagong, Muslims came from indigenous tribals who never followed Hindu rituals.

=== In British India ===
The British East India Company was given the right to collect revenue from Bengal and Bihar by the Treaty of Allahabad after defeating the combined armies of Nawab Mir Qasim of Bengal, Nawab of Awadh, and Mughal emperor at the Battle of Buxar. They annexed Bengal in 1793 after abolishing local rule (Nizamat). The British looted the Bengal treasury, appropriating wealth valued at US$40 billion in modern-day prices. Due to high colonial taxation, Bengali commerce shrank by 50% within 40 years, while at the same time British imports flooded the market. Spinners and weavers starved during famines and Bengal's once industrious cities became impoverished. The East India Company forced opium and indigo cultivation and the permanent settlement dismantled centuries of joint Muslim-Hindu political, military and feudal cooperation.

The Bengal Presidency was established in 1765. Rural eastern Bengal witnessed the earliest rebellions against British rule, including the Faraizi movement led by Haji Shariatullah and the activities of Titumir and Karamat Ali Jaunpuri. The mutiny of 1857 engulfed much of northern India and Bengal, including in Dhaka and Chittagong. Following the end of the mutiny, the British Government took direct control of Bengal from the East India Company and instituted the British Raj. The influence of Christian missionaries increased during this period. To counter this trend, Reazuddin Ahmad Mashadi, Muhammad Reazuddin Ahmad of the Sudhakar newspaper and Munshi Mohammad Meherullah played prominent roles.

The colonial capital Calcutta, where Bengali Muslims formed the second largest community, became the second largest city in the British Empire after London. The late 19th and early 20th-century Indian Renaissance brought dramatic social and political change. The introduction of Western law, government and education introduced modern enlightenment values which created a new politically conscious middle class and a new generation of leaders in science, politics and the arts. The First Partition of Bengal incubated the broader anti-colonial struggle and in 1906 the All India Muslim League was formed during the Muhammadan Education Conference in Dhaka. During this period a Muslim middle class emerged and the University of Dhaka played a role at the beginning of the emancipation of Bengali Muslim society, which was also marked by the emergence progressive groups like the Freedom of Intellect Movement and the Muslim Literary Society. Bengali Muslims were at the forefront of the Indian Independence Movement, including the Pakistan Movement.

=== Bangladesh War of Independence ===
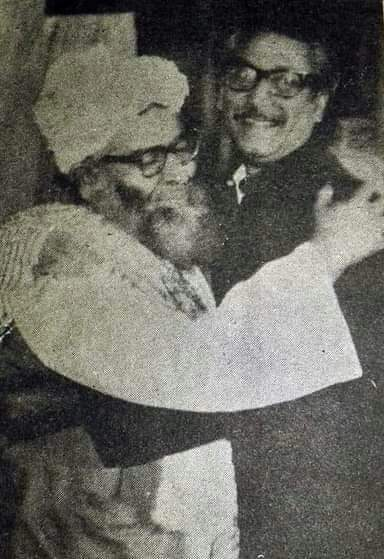
President Sheikh Mujibur Rahman with Mufti Mahmud.

Islamic sentiments powered the definition of nationhood in the 1940s, when Bengali people united with Muslims in other parts of the subcontinent to form Pakistan. In the 70s, the society they then envisioned was based on principles such as socialism, nationalism and democracy. While Islam was still a part of faith and culture, it was no longer the only factor that formed national identity.

=== Modern-day Bangladesh ===
Bangladesh was established as a constitutionally secular state and the Bangladeshi constitution enshrined secular, socialist and democratic principles. However, post-1971 regimes sought to increase the role of the government in the religious life of the people. The government sought closer ties with religious establishments within the country and with Islamic countries such as Saudi Arabia and Pakistan.

Although Islam played a significant role in the life and culture of the people, religion did not dominate national politics because Islam was not the central component of national identity. When in June 1988 an "Islamic way of life" was proclaimed for Bangladesh by constitutional amendment, very little attention was paid outside the intellectual class to the meaning and impact of such an important national commitment. However, most observers believed that the declaration of Islam as the state religion might have a significant impact on national life. Aside from arousing the suspicion of the non-Islamic minorities, it could accelerate the proliferation of religious parties at both the national and the local levels, thereby exacerbating tension and conflict between secular and religious politicians. Unrest of this nature was reported on some college campuses soon after the amendment was promulgated.

== Denominations ==
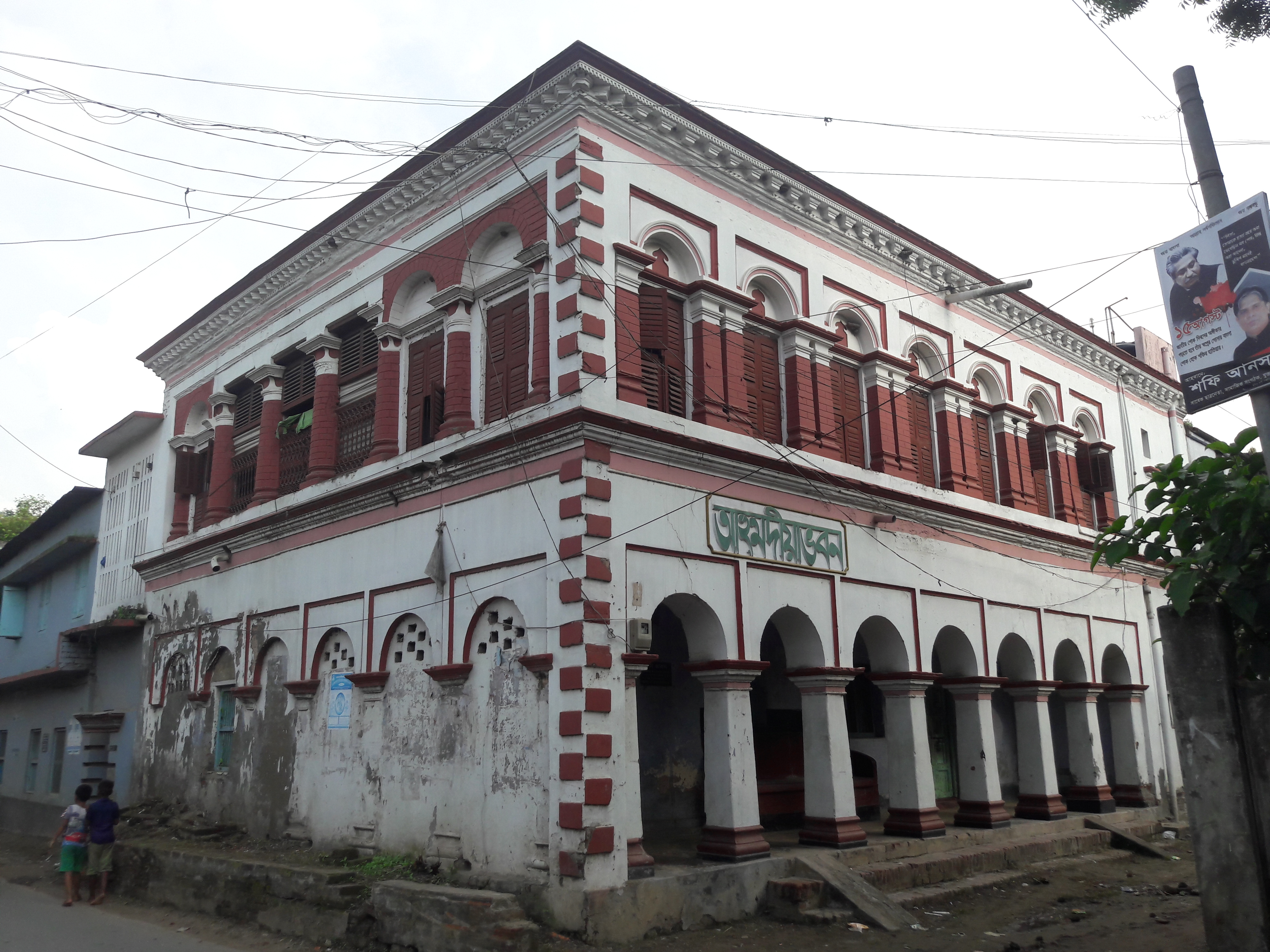
Ahmodia Bhaban (Ahmadiyya Building) at Rohanpur, Rajshahi

Muslims in Bangladesh
religion	percent
Sunni Muslim	99%
Other Muslim	1%

The majority of the Muslims in Bangladesh are Sunni, who mainly follow the Hanafi school of Islamic jurisprudence and the Maturidi school of theology. There are also few Shi'a Muslims, particularly belonging to the Bihari community. The Shi'a observance commemorating the martyrdom of Ali's sons, Hasan and Husayn, are still widely observed by the nation's Sunnis, even though there are small numbers of Shi'as. Among the Shias, the Dawoodi Bohra community is concentrated in Chittagong.

Those who reject the authority of hadith, known as Quranists, are present in Bangladesh, though having not expressed publicly but are active virtually due to fear of gruesome persecution considering the present political situation. The Ahmadiyya community, which is widely considered to be non-Muslim by mainstream Muslim leaders, is estimated to be around 100,000, the community has faced discrimination because of their beliefs and have been persecuted in some areas. There is a very small community of Bangladeshis whom are adherents to the Mahdavia creed. There are some people who do not identify themselves with any sect and just call themselves Muslims.

=== Sufism ===
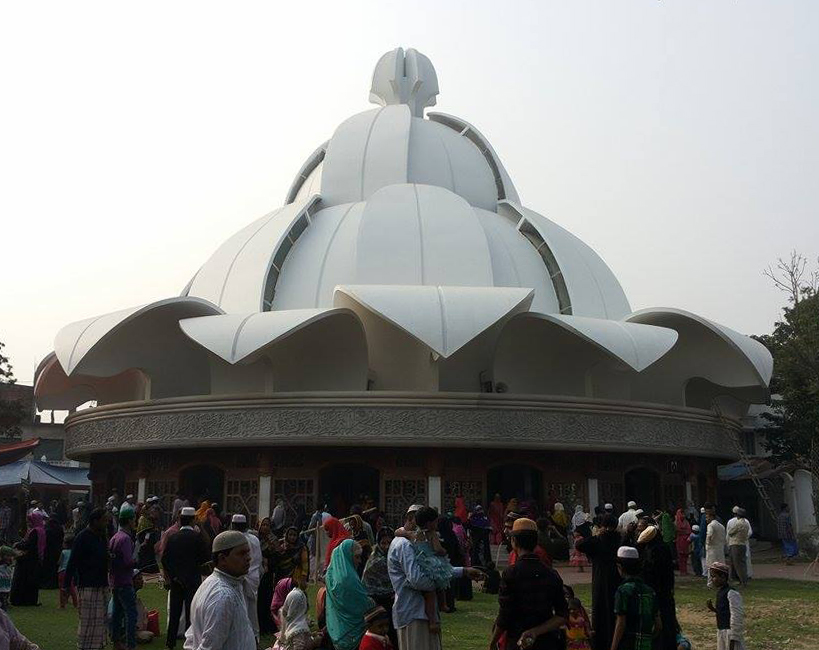
Shrine of Sayed Ziaul Haq, a Bengali Sufi saint

Sufism in Bangladesh is more or less similar to that in the whole Indian subcontinent. India, it is claimed, is one of the five great centers of Sufism, the other four being Persia (including central Asia), Baghdad (in Iraq), Syria, and North Africa. Sufi saints flourished in South Asia preaching the mystic teachings of Sufism that reached the common people. Sufism in Bangladesh is also called pirism, after the pirs or teachers in the Sufi tradition (also called Fakir).

The Sufism tremendously influenced local population and thus these Sufi masters were the single most important factor in South Asian conversions to Islam, particularly in what is now Bangladesh. Most Bangladeshi Muslims are influenced to some degree by Sufism. The conversion to Islam of the population of what was to become Bangladesh began in the thirteenth century and continued for hundreds of years. Muslim pirs who wandered about in villages and towns were responsible for many conversions.

A majority of Bangladeshi Muslims perceive Sufis as a source of spiritual wisdom and guidance and their Khanqahs and Dargahs as nerve centers of Muslim society These majority of Muslims in Bangladesh are Sunni, who mainly follow the Hanafi school of thought (madh'hab).

== Demography ==
Percentage and population of Muslims in Bangladesh by decades
Year	Percentage (%)	Muslim Population	Total population	Notes
1901	66.1%	19,121,160	28,927,626	
1911	67.2%	21,205,203	31,555,363	Before partition
1921	68.1%	22,646,387	33,254,607	Before partition
1931	69.5%	24,744,911	35,604,189	Before partition
1941	70.3%	29,525,452	41,999,221	Before partition
1951	76.9%	32,346,033	42,062,462	During Pakistan period
1961	80.4%	40,847,150	50,804,914	During Pakistan period
1974	85.4%	61,042,675	71,478,543	After independence of Bangladesh
1981	86.7%	75,533,462	87,120,487	After independence of Bangladesh
1991	88.3%	93,881,726	106,315,583	After independence of Bangladesh
2001	89.6%	110,406,654	123,151,871	After independence of Bangladesh
2011	90.4%	135,394,217	149,772,364	After independence of Bangladesh
2022	91.08%	150,422,600	165,158,616	After independence of Bangladesh

Historical Muslim Population in Bangladesh
Year	Pop.	±%
1901	19,121,160	—
1911	21,205,203	+10.9%
1921	22,646,387	+6.8%
1931	24,744,911	+9.3%
1941	29,525,452	+19.3%
1951	32,346,033	+9.6%
1961	40,847,150	+26.3%
1974	61,042,675	+49.4%
1981	75,533,462	+23.7%
1991	93,881,726	+24.3%
2001	110,406,654	+17.6%
2011	135,394,217	+22.6%
2022	150,360,404	+11.1%
Source: God Willing: The Politics of Islamism in Bangladesh by Ali Riaz, p. 63; Bangladesh Bureau of Statistics (BBS)

The population of Bangladesh have gone up from 28.92 million in 1901 to 150.36 million in 2022, as per as statistics the same way the high fertility rate among Muslims have led to over population of the country as according to census, Muslim population have gone up from 19.12 million in 1901 to 150.36 million in 2022. The Muslim percentage have also got increased from 66.1% in 1901 to 91.04% in 2022. Socio-Economic and Demographic Survey 2023 Report of Bangladesh Bureau of Statistics estimates the Muslim share 91.58% of the population.

Estimation shows that over 1 million Rohingya Muslim and Hindu refugees live in Bangladesh who have came here during the period of (2016–17) crisis. On 28 September 2018, at the 73rd United Nations General Assembly, Bangladeshi Prime Minister Sheikh Hasina said there are 1.1-1.3 million Rohingya refugees now in Bangladesh.

According to the Pew research center, Muslim population of Bangladesh will reach 218.5-237.5 million by the year 2050, and will constitute overwhelming 95% of the country's population, thus making the country 4th largest Muslim populated around that time.

=== Islam by districts ===
Map of percentage of Bangladeshi Muslims by Upazila (2011 census) Muslim Population across districts of Bangladesh (2022)
District	Muslim population	Total population	Percentage (%)
Barguna	937,545	1,010,531	92.78%
Barisal	2,283,728	2,570,446	88.85%
Bhola	1,876,758	1,932,518	97.11%
Jhalokati	599,622	661,160	90.69%
Patuakhali	1,617,155	1,727,254	93.63%
Pirojpur	1,017,024	1,198,195	84.88%
Bandarban	253,756	481,106	52.74%
Brahmanbaria	3,084,642	3,306,563	93.29%
Chandpur	2,488,435	2,635,748	94.41%
Chattogram	8,026,102	9,169,465	87.53%
Cumilla	5,936,391	6,212,216	95.56%
Cox's Bazar	2,669,977	2,823,268	94.57%
Feni	1,556,695	1,648,896	94.41%
Khagrachhari	332,687	714,119	46.59%
Lakshmipur	1,875,790	1,937,948	96.79%
Noakhali	3,476,457	3,625,442	95.89%
Rangamati	234,834	647,586	36.26%
Dhaka	13,980,953	14,734,701	94.88%
Faridpur	1,979,011	2,162,879	91.50%
Gazipur	4,971,543	5,263,450	94.45%
Gopalganj	933,708	1,295,057	72.10%
Kishoreganj	3,108,432	3,267,626	95.13%
Madaripur	1,146,678	1,293,027	88.68%
Manikganj	1,418,353	1,558,025	91.04%
Munshiganj	1,500,984	1,625,416	92.34%
Narayanganj	3,722,125	3,909,138	95.22%
Narsingdi	2443210	2,224,944	94.53%
Rajbari	1,078,677	1,189,818	90.66%
Shariatpur	1,251,521	1,294,562	96.88%
Tangail	3,762,822	4,037,608	93.20%
Bagerhat	1,342,836	1,613,076	83.25%
Chuadanga	1,204,617	1,234,054	97.61%
Jessore	2,756,729	3,076,144	89.62%
Jhenaidah	1,836,273	2,005,849	91.55%
Khulna	2,055,902	2,613,385	78.67%
Kushtia	2,090,622	2,149,692	97.25%
Magura	870,482	1,033,115	84.26%
Meherpur	690,349	705,356	97.87%
Narail	663,961	788,671	84.19%
Satkhira	1,851,516	2,196,582	84.29%
Jamalpur	2,458,714	2,499,738	98.36%
Mymensingh	5,665,649	5,899,005	96.04%
Netrokona	2,103,091	2,324,853	90.46%
Sherpur	1,456,087	1,501,853	96.95%
Bogra	3,516,157	3,734,297	94.16%
Chapai Nawabganj	1,753,993	1,835,528	95.56%
Joypurhat	859,960	956,431	89.91%
Naogaon	2,419,236	2,784,599	86.88%
Natore	1,744,274	1,859,922	93.78%
Pabna	2,828,381	2,909,624	97.21%
Rajshahi	2,740,180	2,915,009	94.00%
Sirajganj	3,210,116	3,357,706	95.61%
Dinajpur	2,605,781	3,315,236	78.60%
Gaibandha	2,380,128	2,562,233	92.89%
Kurigram	2,185,248	2,329,160	93.82%
Lalmonirhat	1,242,388	1,428,406	86.98%
Nilphamari	1,763,751	2,092,568	84.29%
Panchagarh	991,764	1,179,843	84.06%
Rangpur	2,872,953	3,169,614	90.64%
Thakurgaon	1,181,774	1,533,895	77.04%
Habiganj	1,981,089	2,358,886	83.98%
Maulvibazar	1,585,235	2,123,447	74.65%
Sunamganj	2,377,349	2,695,496	88.20%
Sylhet	3,570,400	3,857,123	92.57%

== Culture ==
=== Theology and religious education ===
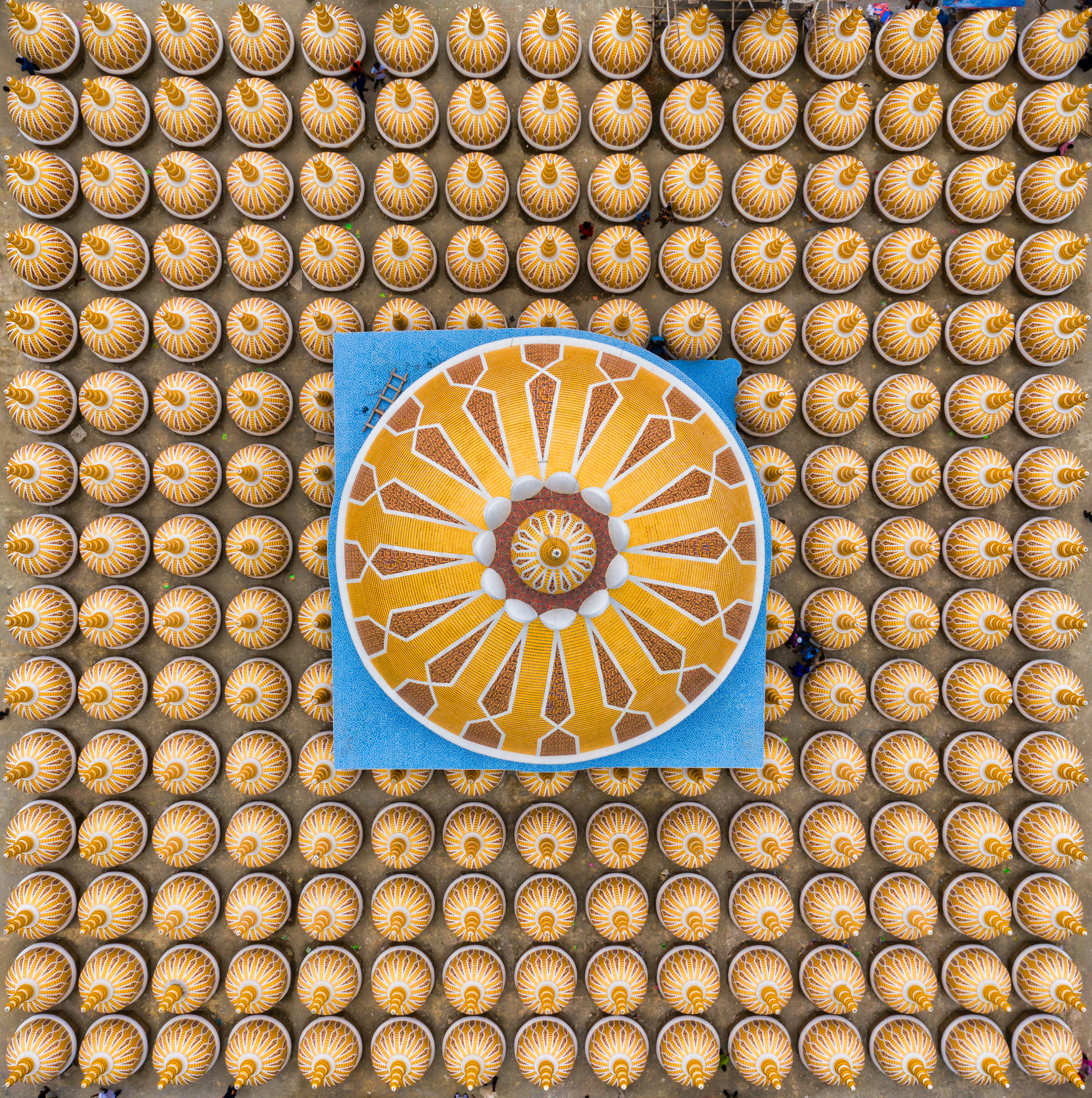
201 Dome Mosque

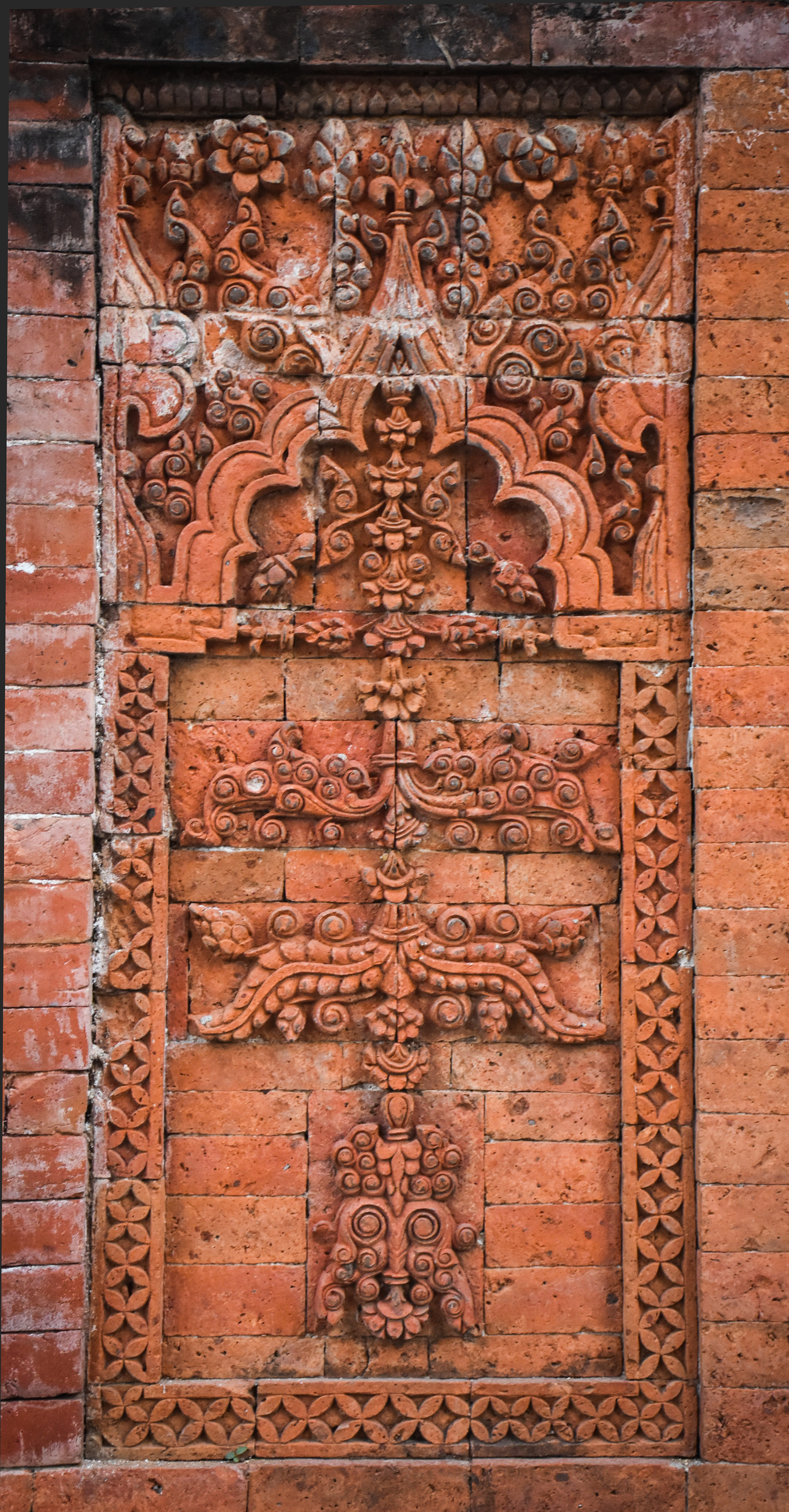
Terracotta art of Sura Mosque

The members of the Ulama include Mawlānā, Imams, Ulama and Muftis. The first two titles are accorded to those who have received special training in Islamic theology and law. A maulvi has pursued higher studies in a madrassa, a school of religious education attached to a mosque. Additional study on the graduate level leads to the title Mawlānā.

The madrassas are also divided in two mainstreams; Alia Madrasah and Qawmi Madrasah.

=== Visual arts ===
==== Islamic architecture in Bangladesh ====
The architecture of the Bengal Sultanate saw a distinct style of domed mosques with complex niche pillars that had no minarets. Ivory, pottery and brass were also widely used in Bengali art. Bangladeshi village housing is noted as the origin of the bungalow. The Bengal roofs, associated by mughal architecture can be traced back to rural Bangladesh's architecture. Modernist terracotta architecture in South Asia is popularized by architects like Muzharul Islam.

==== Mosques ====
Bangladesh has a vast amount of historic mosques with its own Islamic architecture.

- Abu Aqqas Mosque (648)
- Shahbaz Khan Mosque (1679)
- Shona Mosque (1493)
- Bagha Mosque (1523)
- Khan Mohammad Mridha Mosque (1703)
- Sixty Dome Mosque (15th century)

==== Forts ====
Lalbagh Fort (1664)

Idarakpur Fort (17th century)

==== Clothing ====
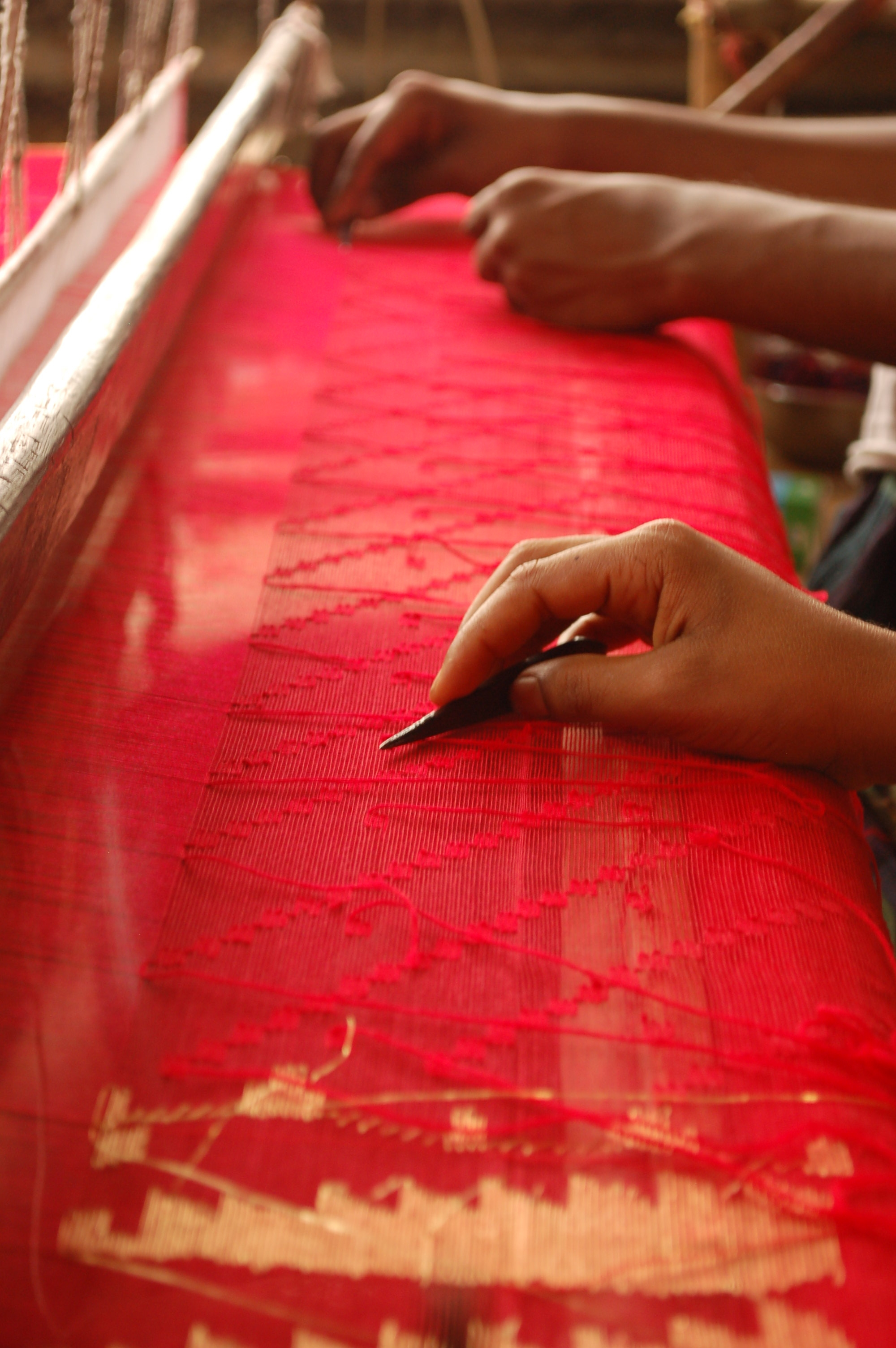
Jamdani Weaving

Bengal emerged as the foremost muslin exporter in the world, with Dhaka as capital of the worldwide muslin trade. In the latter half of the 18th century, muslin weaving ceased in Bengal due to cheap fabrics from England and oppression by the colonialists. Mughal Bengal was a major silk exporter. The Bengali silk industry declined after the growth of Japanese silk production. Rajshahi silk continues to be produced in northern Bangladesh. Mughal Bengal's most celebrated artistic tradition was the weaving of Jamdani motifs on fine muslin, which is now classified by UNESCO as an intangible cultural heritage. Jamdani motifs were similar to Iranian textile art (buta motifs) and Western textile art (paisley). The Jamdani weavers in Dhaka received imperial patronage.

Modern Bangladesh is one of the world's largest textile producers, with a large cotton based ready made garments industry.

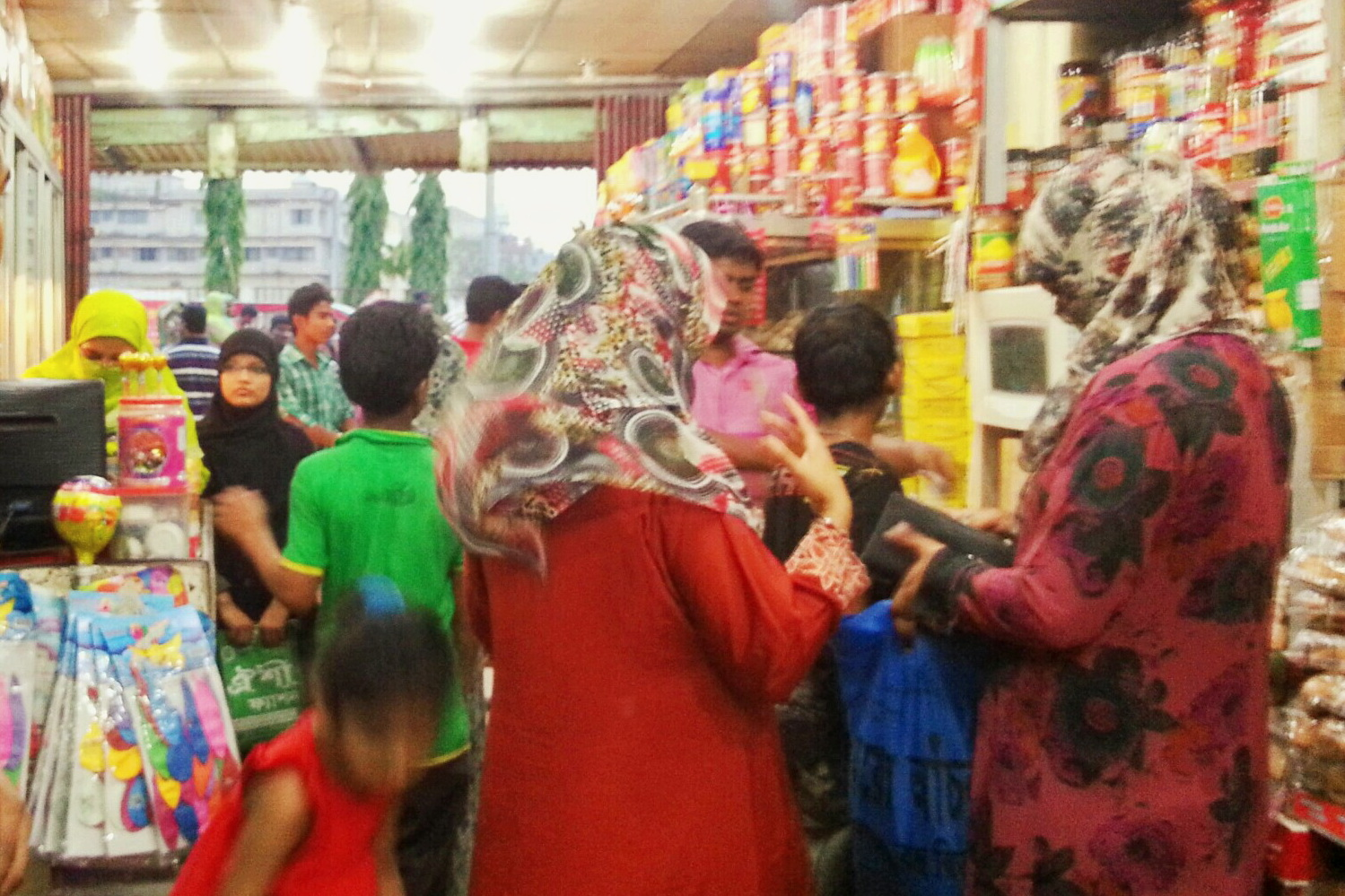
Muslim women, wearing hijab which is a version of modest Islamic clothing, can be seen shopping at a department store in Comilla, Bangladesh.

In Bangladesh, hijab is not mandated by law. Due to the widespread prevalence of the sari, Bengali Muslim women, like their Hindu counterparts, cover their head by the wrapping over the loose end of the sari like a headscarve, similar to the ghoonghat of Hindus. Veiling can be achieved by pulling down the ends of the cloth wrapped around the head upto the level of the face.

The purdah for Muslim upper- and middle-class women in India and later Pakistan and Bangladesh, both in the form of gender segregation as well as the veil, fell out of fashion due to women's active mobilisation in the anticolonial struggle for independence. The anti colonial independence movement in the Muslim world was dominated by secular modernists, who considered women's liberation as a natural part of achieving a modernized and revitalized Muslim world, and by the 1930s Muslim upper-class women had started to appear unveiled.

Veiling was historically not common in Bangladesh. Middle- and upper-class women dressed in modern Western clothing and working class women in traditional Indian sari, and veiling was seen by the middle class as a sign of low class and low education.

From the 1990s onward veiling gradually become more common as Bangladesh began to be Islamised under the rule of Hussain Muhammad Ershad (following into the footsteps of his predecessor Ziaur Rahman), accompanied the rise of political Islam and Islamic revivalism in society triggered by normalisation of bilateral relationship with Pakistan (then under the rule of Zia-ul-Haq), the Iranian revolution, the rise of the Afghan mujahideen and the Grand Mosque seizure, thus by the early 21st-century veiling started to become common.

==== Sculpture ====
Ivory sculptural art flourished across the region under the Nawabs of Bengal. Novera Ahmed is notable modernist sculptors from Bangladesh.

=== Performing arts ===
==== Theatre ====
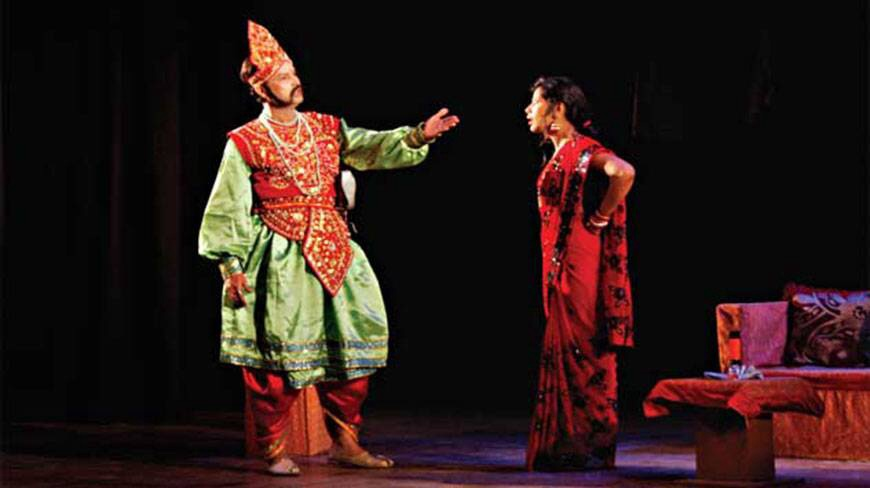
Jatra performance

The earliest extant literary evidence of the existence of the form in Bengal is a couplet in Yusuf-Zulekha written by the medieval Bengali poet, Shah Muhammad Sagir. By the 18th century, scroll-painting performances gained popularity even among the Muslims, as evinced by Gazir Pat (scroll-painting performances eulogising Pir Gazi), which can still be seen in Bangladesh today.

==== Music ====
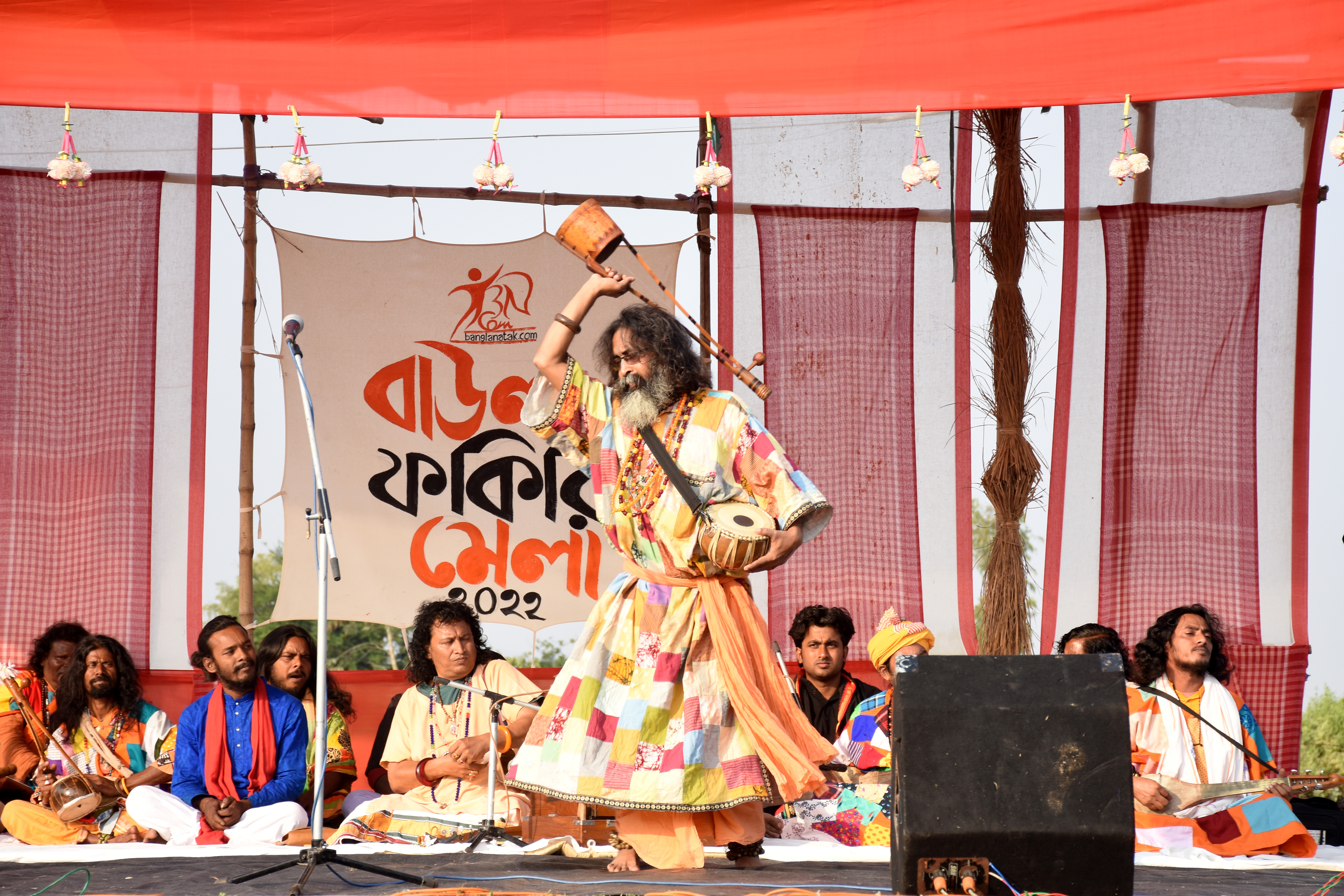
Baul is philosophy and music

A notable feature of Bengali Muslim music is the syncretic Baul tradition, influenced by Sufism. The most prominent practitioner was Lalon Shah. Baul music of Bangladesh is included in the UNESCO Masterpieces of the Oral and Intangible Heritage of Humanity. Alauddin Khan, Ali Akbar Khan, and Gul Mohammad Khan were notable Muslim exponents of Hindustani classical music from East Bengal. Artists like Runa Laila and Shahnaz Rahmatullah from East Pakistan, became widely acclaimed for their musical talents across South Asia in the field of modern music. Nazrul Sangeet is the collection of 4,000 songs and ghazals written by the national poet, Nazrul Islam.

=== Festivals ===
Eid al-Fitr and Eid al-Adha are the largest religious festivals in Bangladesh. Eid al-Fitr is held at the end of Ramadan. Eid al-Adha is the ritual of sacrifice, with cows and goats as the main sacrificial animals. Muharram (Ashura) and Muhammad's birthday are national holidays in Bangladesh, accompanied by Jashn-e Julus and Tazia procession, respectively. Other festivals include Shab-e-Barat which feature prayers and exchange of sweets. Waz Mahfil and Urs also create local festivities.

== Organization ==
The Ministry of Religious Affairs provided support, financial assistance, and endowments to religious institutions, including mosques and community prayer grounds (Idgahs). The organization of Hajj also came under the auspices of the ministry because of limits on the number of pilgrims admitted by the government of Saudi Arabia and the restrictive foreign exchange regulations of the government of Bangladesh. The ministry also directed the policy and the program of the Islamic Foundation Bangladesh, which was responsible for organizing and supporting research and publications on Islamic subjects. The foundation also maintains the Baitul Mukarram (National Mosque), and organized the training of imams. Some 18,000 imams were scheduled for training once the government completed establishment of a national network of Islamic cultural centers and mosque libraries. Under the patronage of the Islamic Foundation, an encyclopedia of Islam in the Bengali language was being compiled in the late 1980s.

Another step toward further government involvement in religious life was taken in 1984 when the semi-official Zakat Fund Committee was established under the chairmanship of the president of Bangladesh. The committee solicited annual zakat contributions on a voluntary basis. The revenue so generated was to be spent on orphanages, schools, children's hospitals, and other charitable institutions and projects. Commercial banks and other financial institutions were encouraged to contribute to the fund.

== Law ==
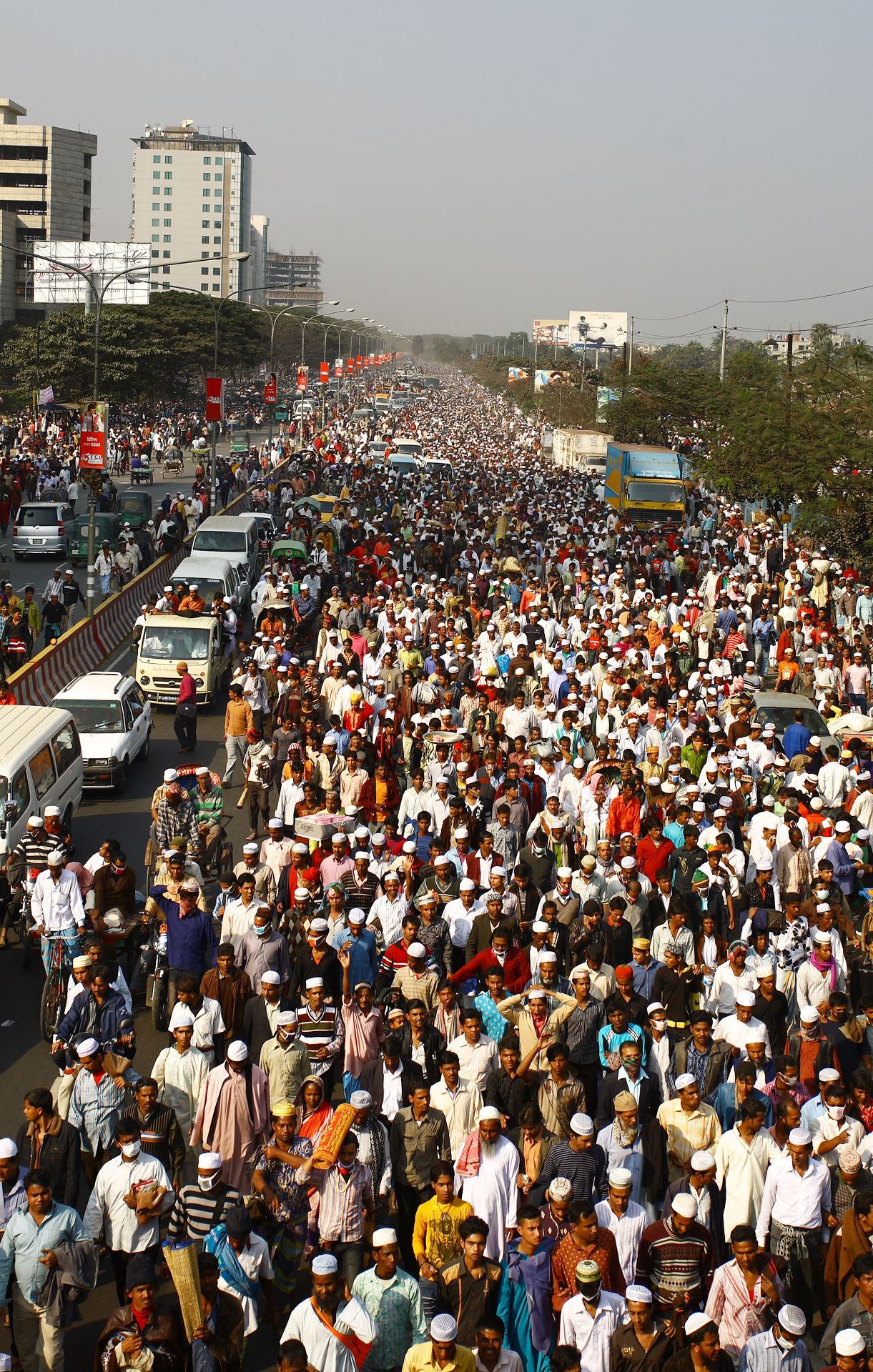
Bishwa Ijtema held annually by Tablighi Jamat

In Bangladesh, where a modified Anglo-Indian civil and criminal legal system operates, there are no official sharia courts. Most Muslim marriages, however, are presided over by the qazi, a traditional Muslim judge whose advice is also sought on matters of personal law, such as inheritance, divorce, and the administration of religious endowments.

The inheritance rights of Muslim in Bangladesh are governed by The Muslim Personal Law (Shariat) Application Act (1937) and The Muslim Family Laws Ordinance (1961). Article 2 of The Muslim Personal Law Application Act provides that questions related to succession and inheritance are governed by Muslim Personal Law (Shariat). Article 2 proclaims: "any custom or usage to the contrary, in all questions (save questions relating to agricultural land) regarding intestate succession, special property of females, including personal property inherited or obtained under contract or gift or any other provision of Personal Law, marriage, dissolution of marriage, including talaq, ila, zihar, lian, khula and mubaraat, maintenance, dower, guardianship, gifts, trusts and trust properties, and waqfs (other than charities and charitable institutions and charitable and religious endowments) the rule of decision in cases where the parties are Muslims shall be the Muslim Personal Law (Shariat)."

== Status of religious freedom ==
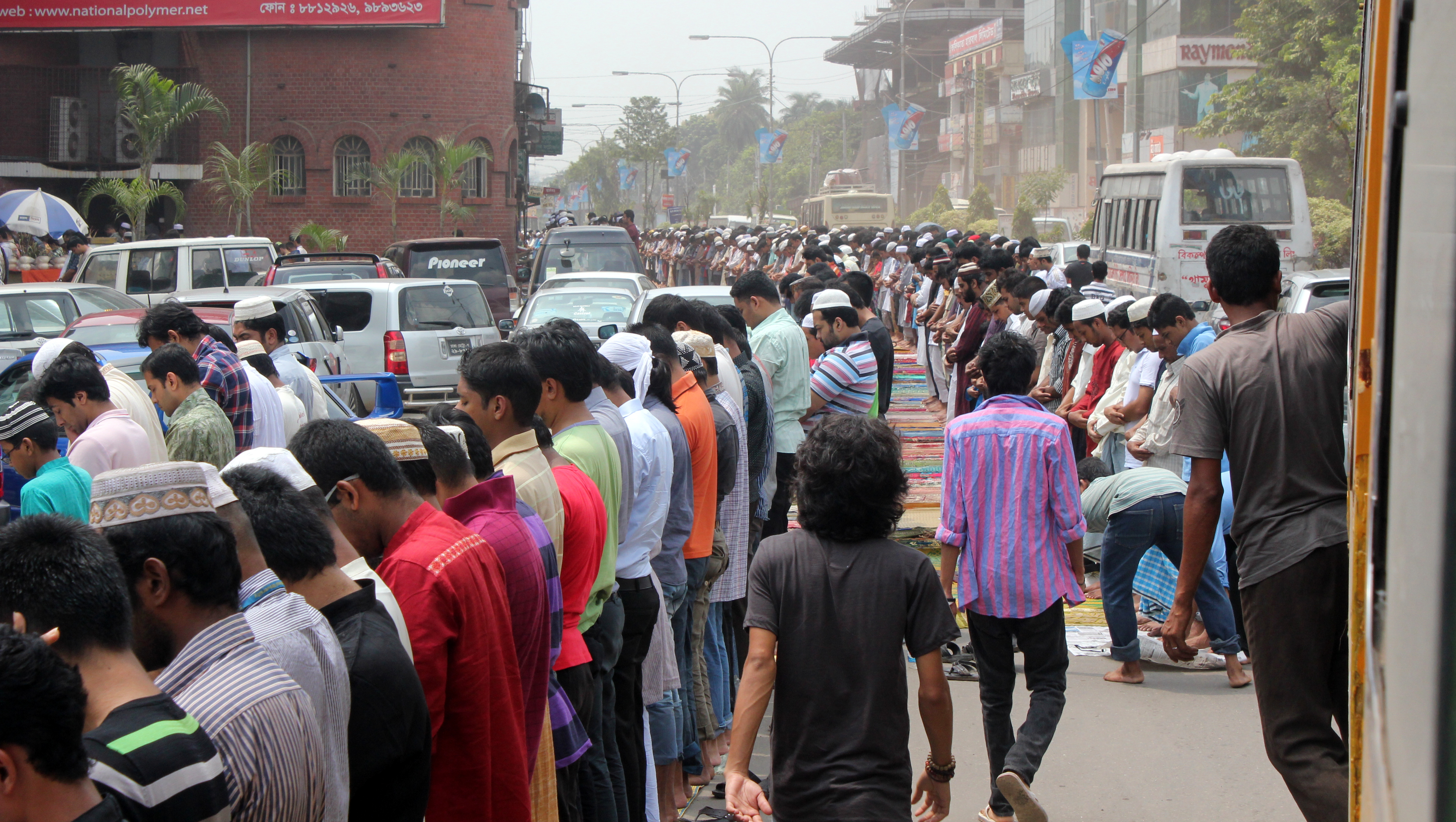
Friday prayer for Muslims in Dhaka

The Constitution establishes Islam as the state religion but upholds the right to practice—subject to law, public order, and morality—the religion of one's choice. The Government generally respects this provision in practice. However, there has been instances when the government tried to restrict minority Muslim voices. For example, the Four Party Alliance government between 2001 and 2006, led by Bangladesh Nationalist Party and Jamaat-e-Islami Bangladesh, banned Ahmadiyya literature by an executive order.

== See also ==
- Islam in South Asia
  - Islam in West Bengal
- Ethnic groups:
  - Bengali Muslims
  - Meitei Pangals
- Dobhashi
- Lost Mosque
- Maizbhandari
- Baul
- Satya Pir
