= Lost Mosque =

7th-century mosque in Bangladesh

- সাহাবায়ে কেরাম মসজিদ
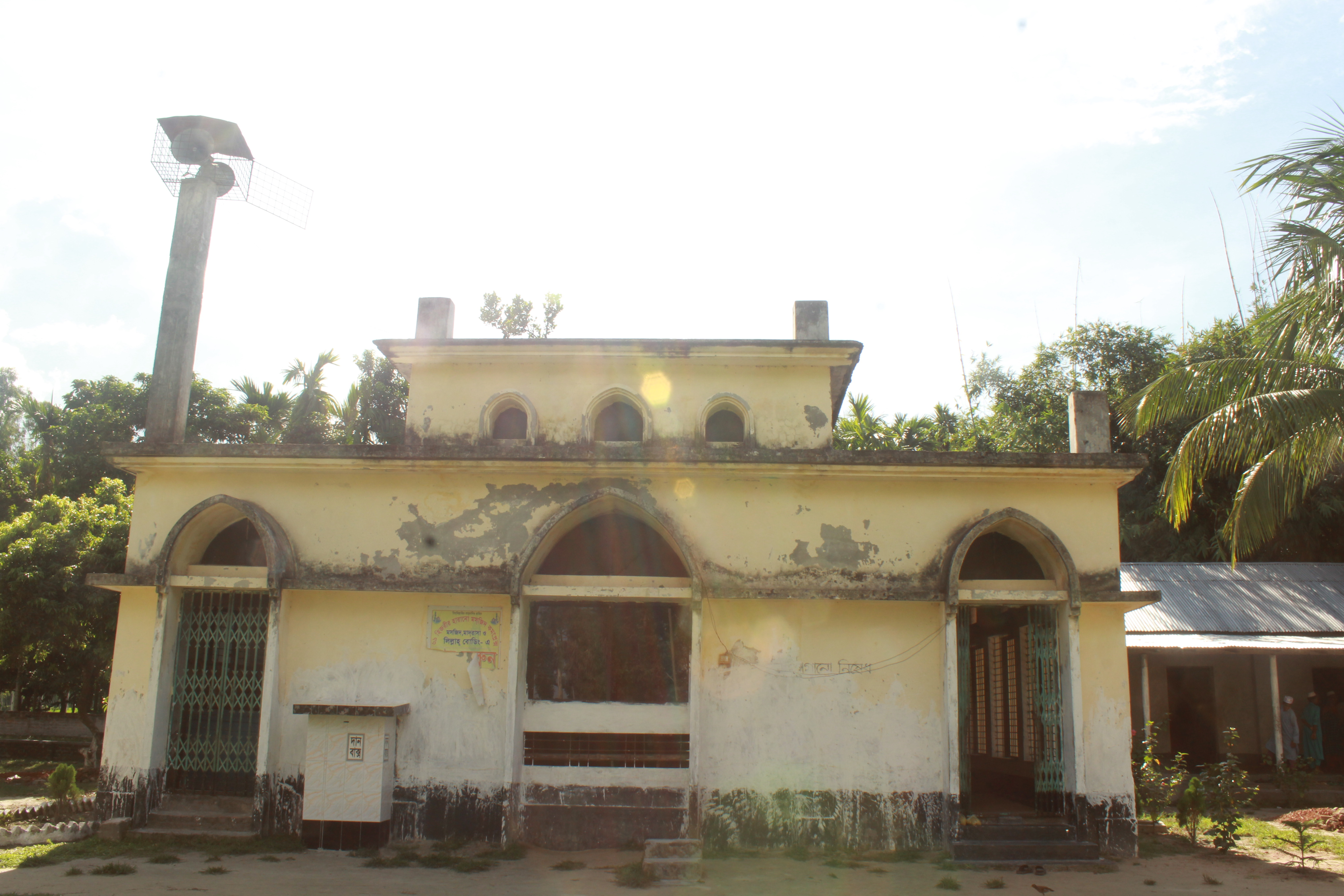
- The mosque in 2018

- Location of the mosque in Bangladesh

Religion
- Affiliation: Islam
- Ecclesiastical or organisational status: Mosque
- Status: Active

Location
- Location: Panchagram, Lalmonirhat, Lalmonirhat Sadar Upazila, Rangpur Division
- Country: Bangladesh
- Coordinates: 25°51′36″N 89°30′21″E

Architecture
- Type: Mosque architecture
- Style: Islamic
- Founder: Companion Sa'd ibn Abi Waqqas
- Completed: 69 AH (688/689 CE)

Specifications
- Length: 6.4 m (21 ft)
- Width: 3 m (9.8 ft)
- Inscriptions: One
- Materials: Brick; terracotta

The Lost Mosque also known by its official name, Jame' As-Sahaba (Bengali: সাহাবায়ে কেরাম মসজিদ) is an ancient mosque located in Panchagram, in Lalmonirhat District, in Rangpur Division of Bangladesh. A inscription discovered claims the mosque to be built in 69 AH (688/689 CE). The site often referred to as the 'Lost Mosque' or Harano Masjid, is of significant local interest, but its historical origins remain a subject of debate rather than scientific consensus. The site has not undergone a formal peer-reviewed archaeological excavation. Consequently, the claim that the mosque dates to 69 AH—based primarily on a terracotta inscription discovered by locals in 1986- lacks independent archaeological verification. Informal carbon dating inquiries, reportedly conducted on material from the site, have yielded inconclusive results. Some reports suggest that due to insufficient organic material and potential sample contamination, the dating remains unreliable; however, preliminary analysis indicated that the tested material may originate from the early 18th century, contradicting the earlier local claims of 7th-century origins.

== History ==
For many years, there existed a desolate jungle in Ramdas Mouza of Panchagram Union, Lalmonirhat district. The locals called this jungle 'Majder Ara,' where 'Ara' signifies a dense, wild area. While clearing the jungle, ancient bricks were discovered. As the soil and bricks were further removed, the foundation of a mosque was unearthed. A study of an ancient inscription found there revealed that the mosque was established in 69 AH (688/689 CE).

=== Inscription ===
A 15.2-by-15.2-by-5.1-centimetre (6 in × 6 in × 2 in) inscription was discovered within the ruins of the mosque. The inscription was clearly written in Arabic, stating "La ilaha illallah Muhammadur Rasulullah, Hijri year 69". This historical artifact is now housed in the Tajhat Museum located in Rangpur.

== Research ==
In early 1987, locals alerted journalists and researchers about the discovery of the lost mosque. Subsequently, over a hundred researchers, archaeologists, and historians flocked to the site for investigation.

Amateur archaeologist Tim Steel, an advisor at the Tiger Tourism Institution, conducted extensive research on the Lalmonirhat mosque. According to traditional history, Sufis first arrived in the Chittagong region in the 10th century. The spread of Islam in East Bengal began through Sufis in the 11th and 12th centuries, and they are believed to have built the first mosques in the region. Therefore, the existence of a mosque so early in this area is quite astonishing.

Team Steel then contacted the American Institute of Archaeologists. Researchers specializing in Islamic history there pointed to the writings of several Roman and German historians, which mentioned Arab and Roman traders traveling to and from the Brahmaputra basin for maritime trade. Additionally, several ongoing studies have provided evidence that the Brahmaputra-Tista basin was one of the oldest international maritime trade routes in the world. Team Steel also received support from the research of Professor Shah Nawaz, an archaeologist who found evidence of an ancient city in Bhitargarh, Panchagarh. He believed that discovering the history of the mosque's construction might unveil another chapter in the relationship between the history of northern Bangladesh and world civilization.

== Gallery ==
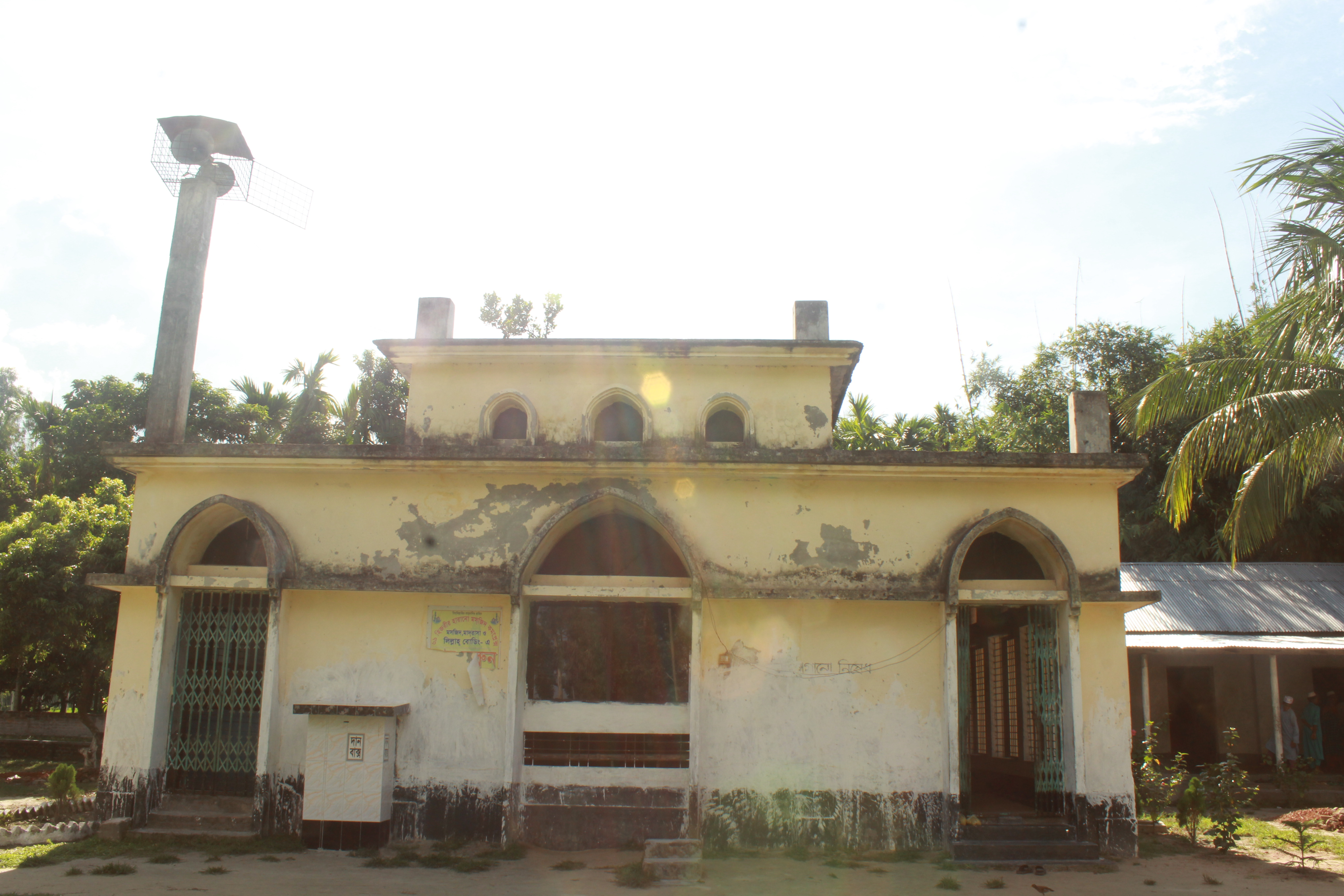
New mosque

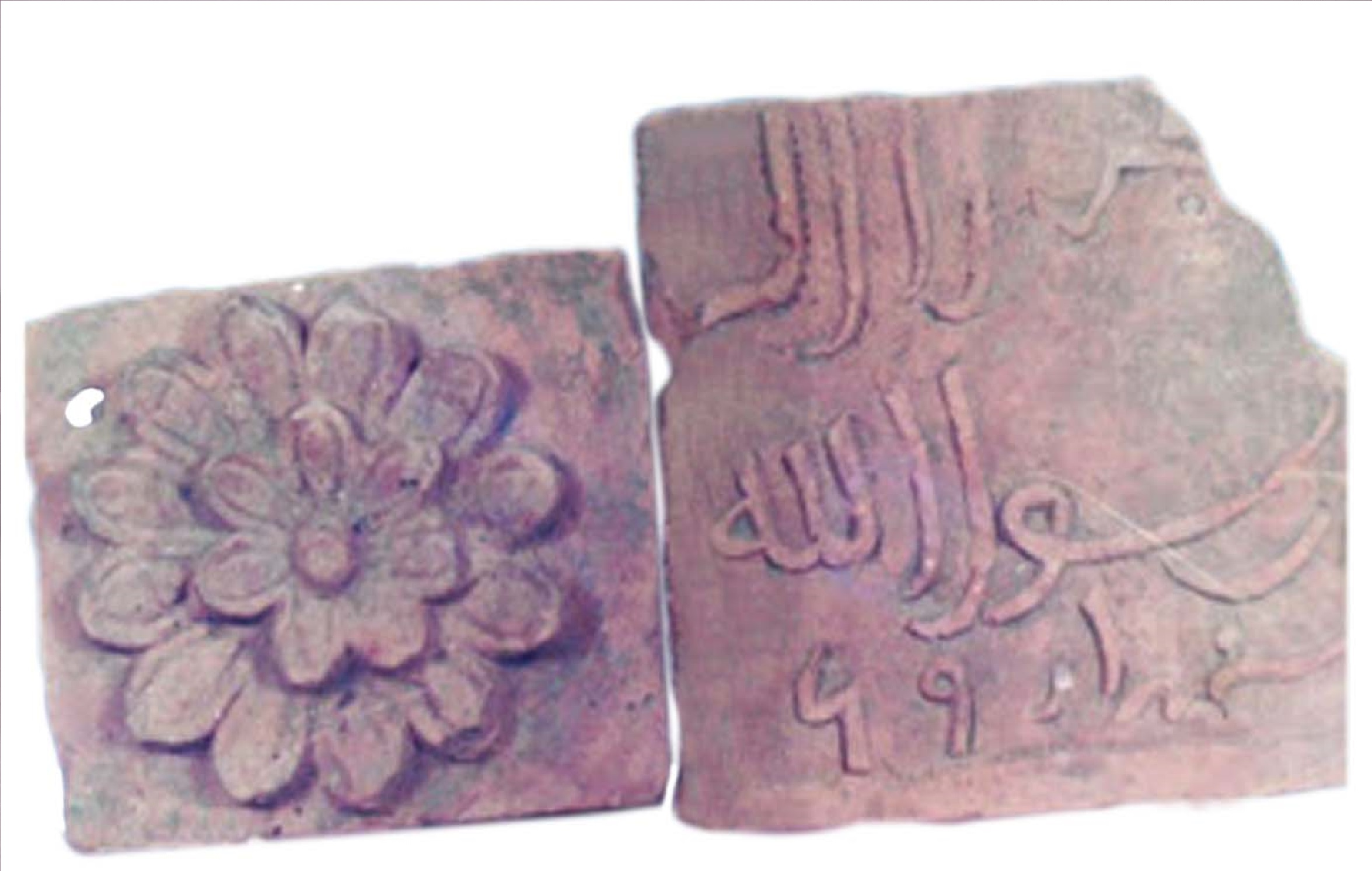
Inscription

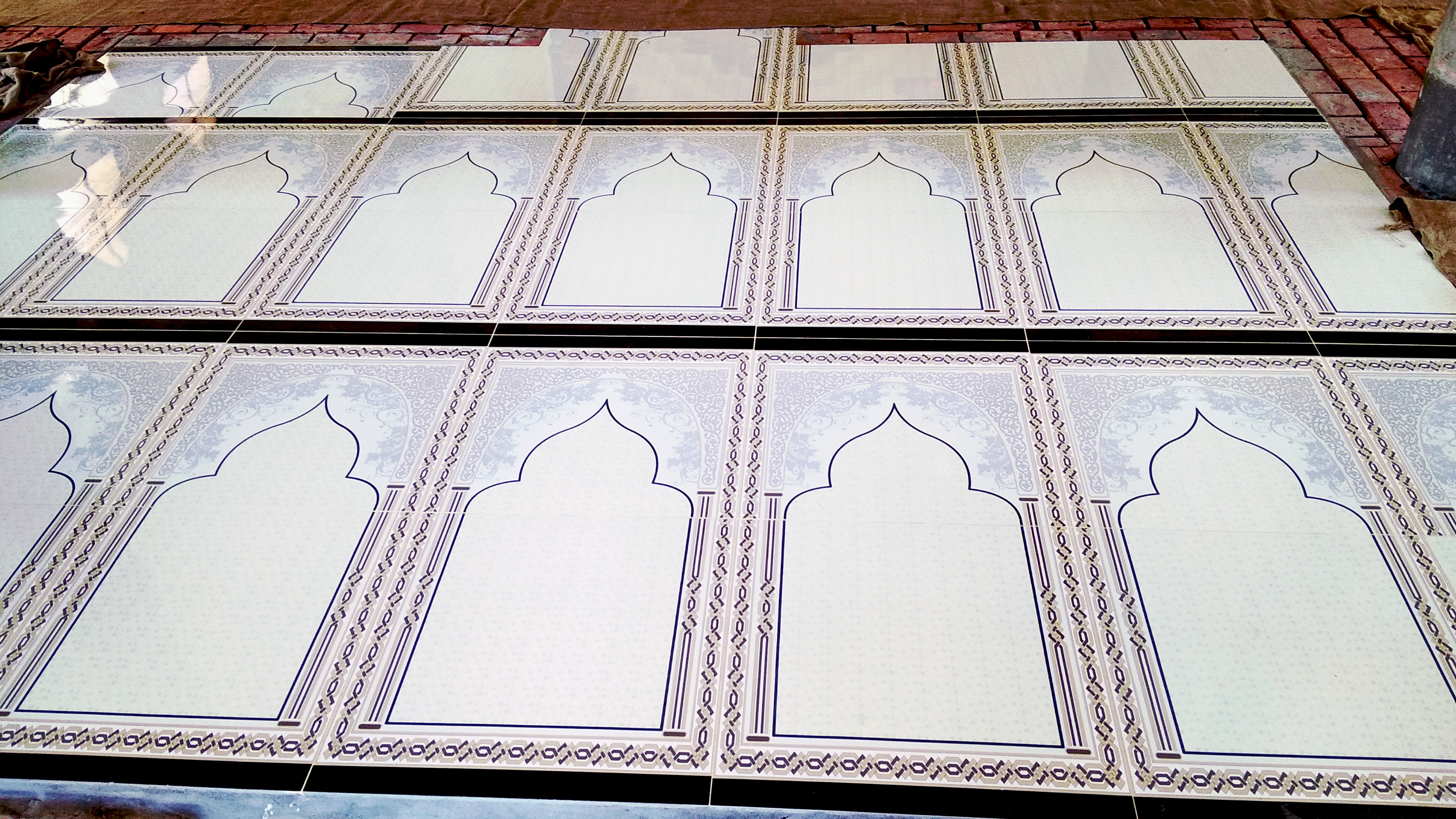
Main part

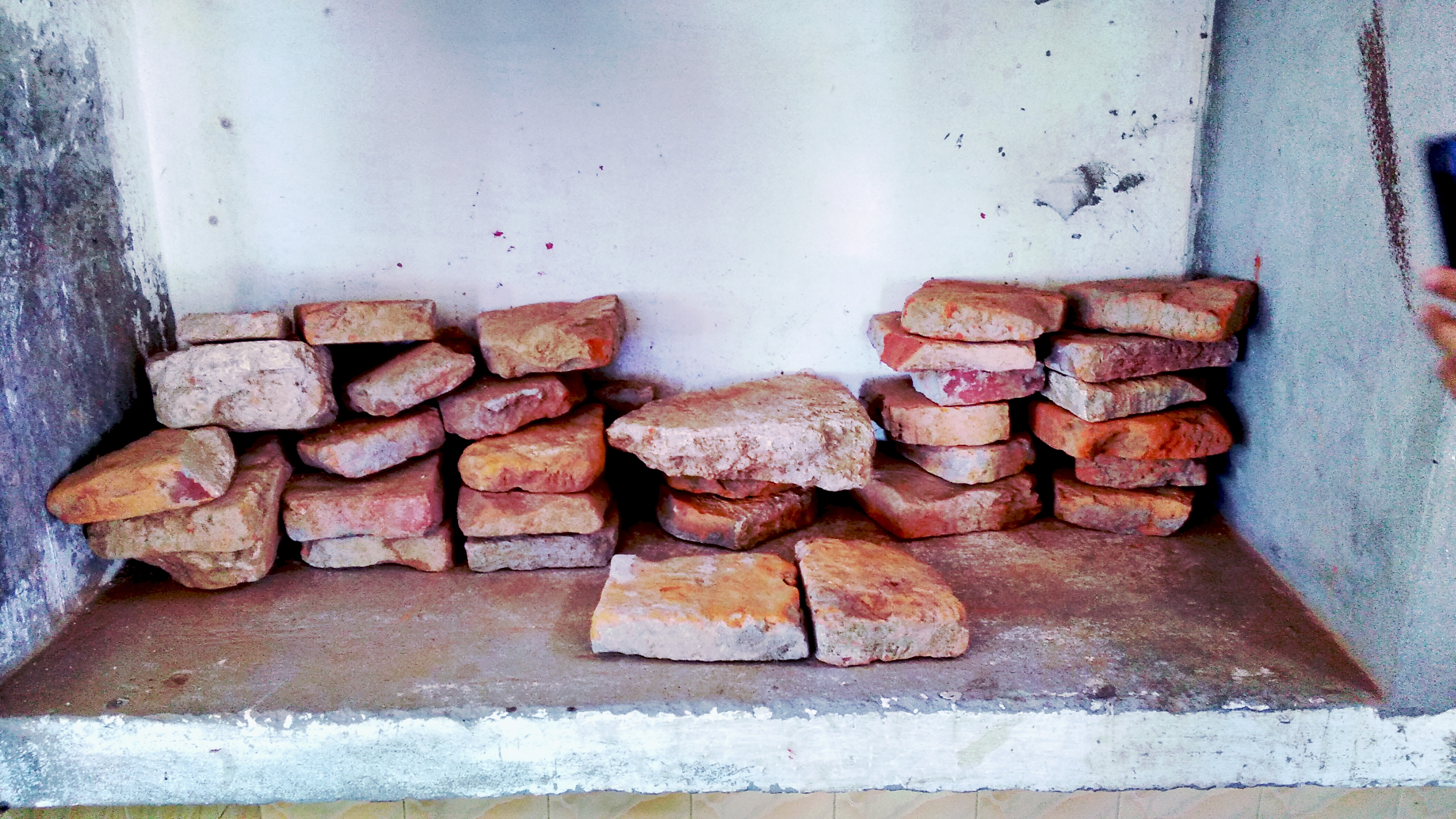
Ruins

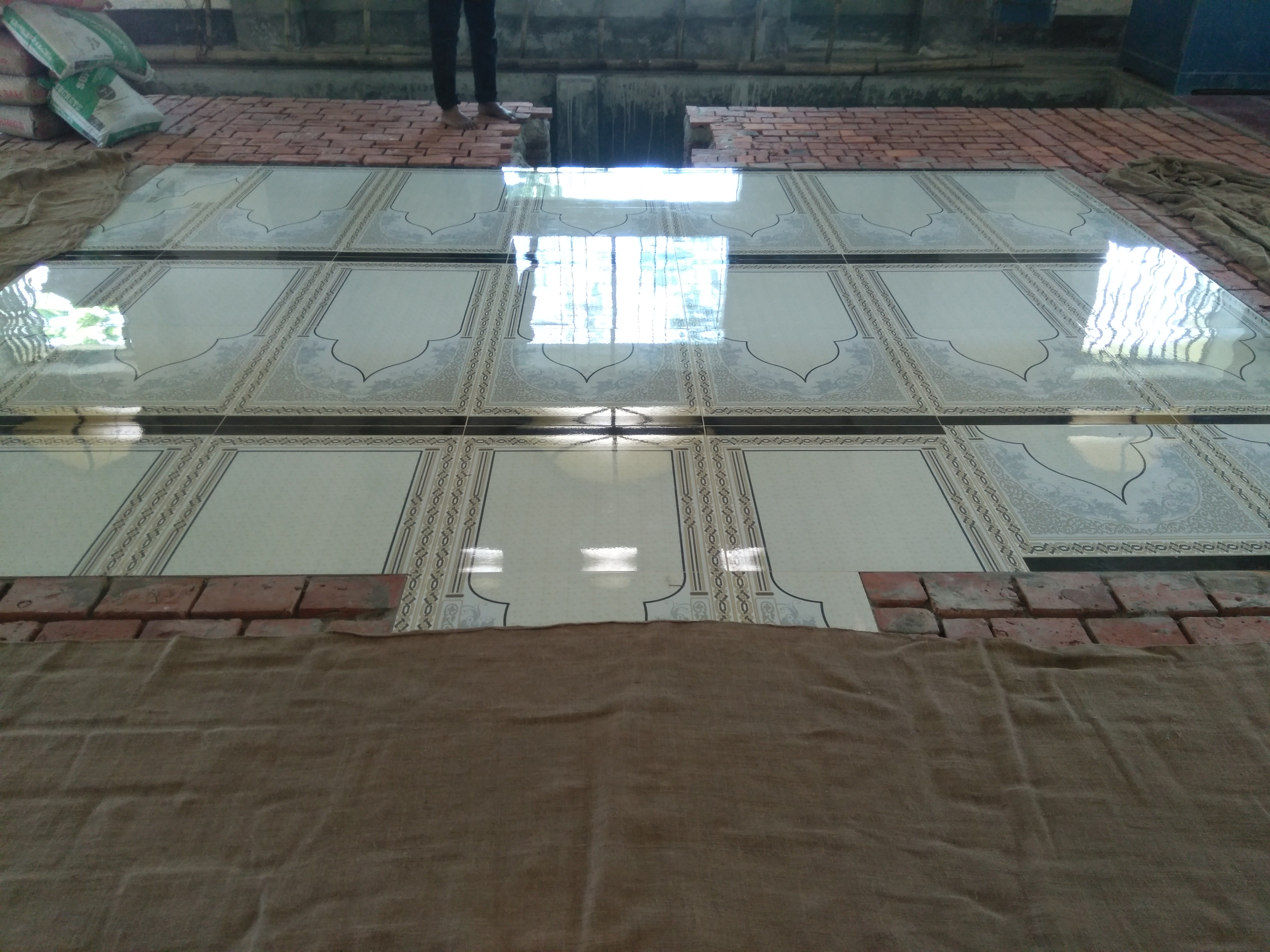
Main part

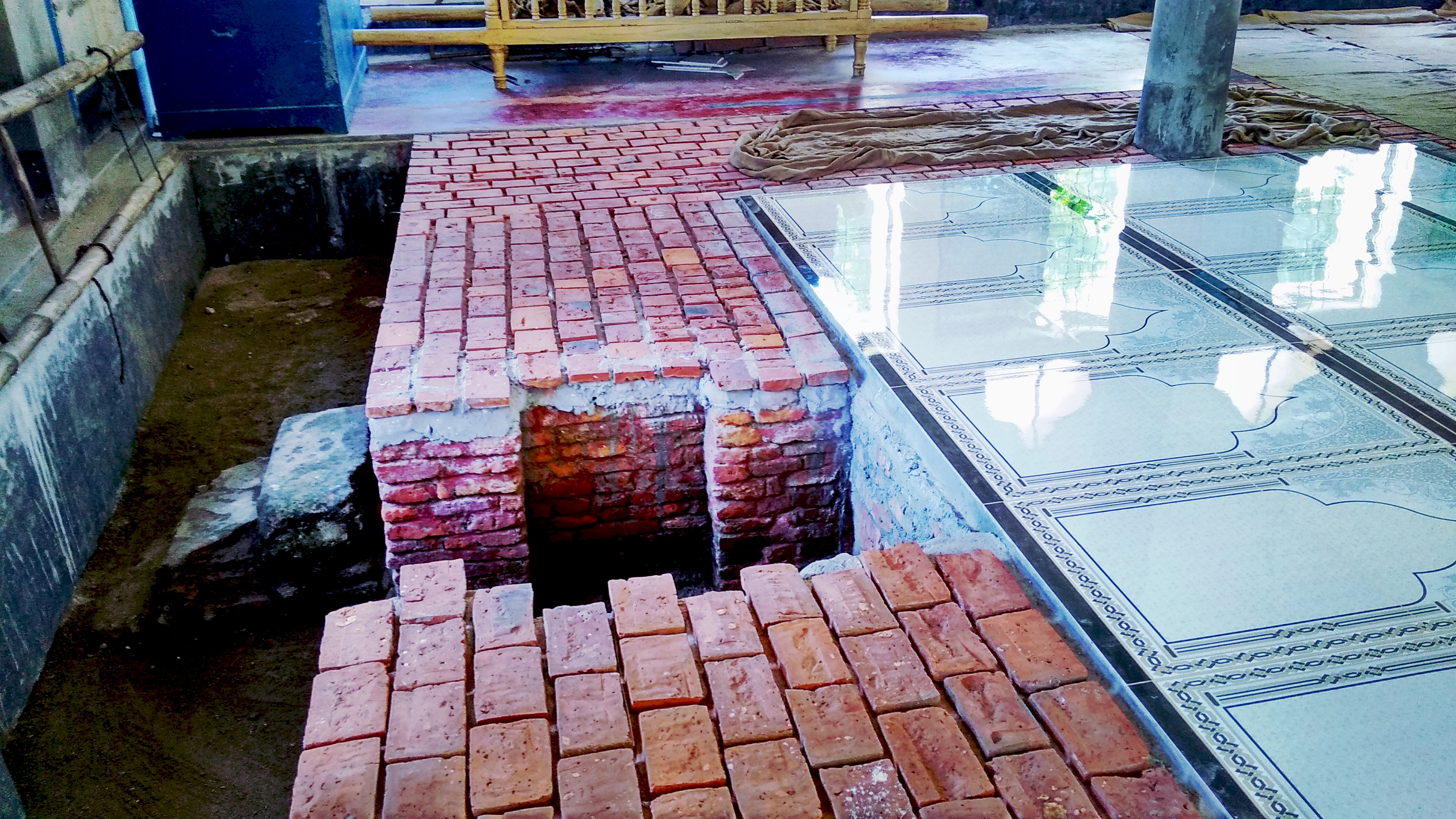
Ancient minbar

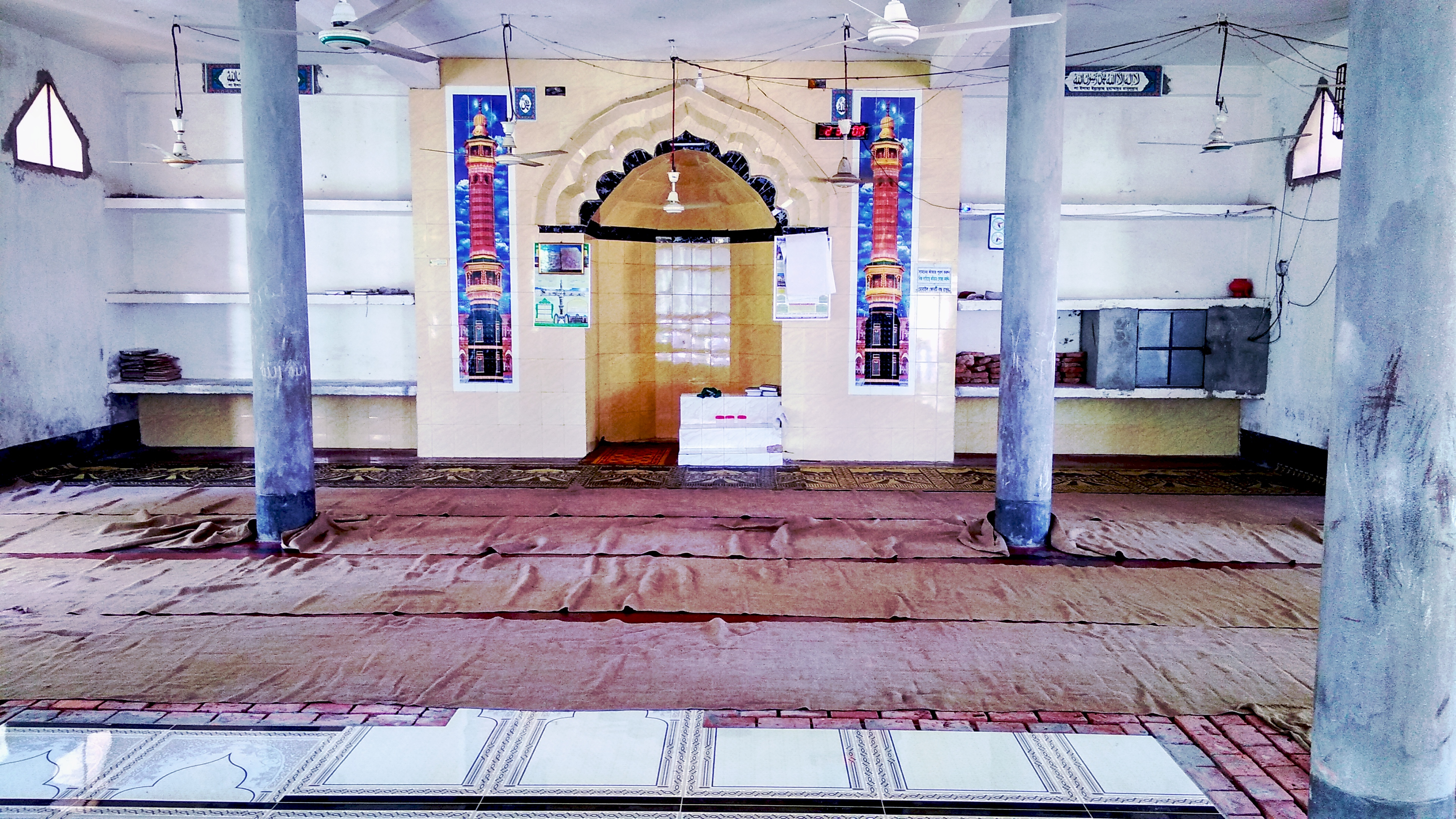
Current minbar

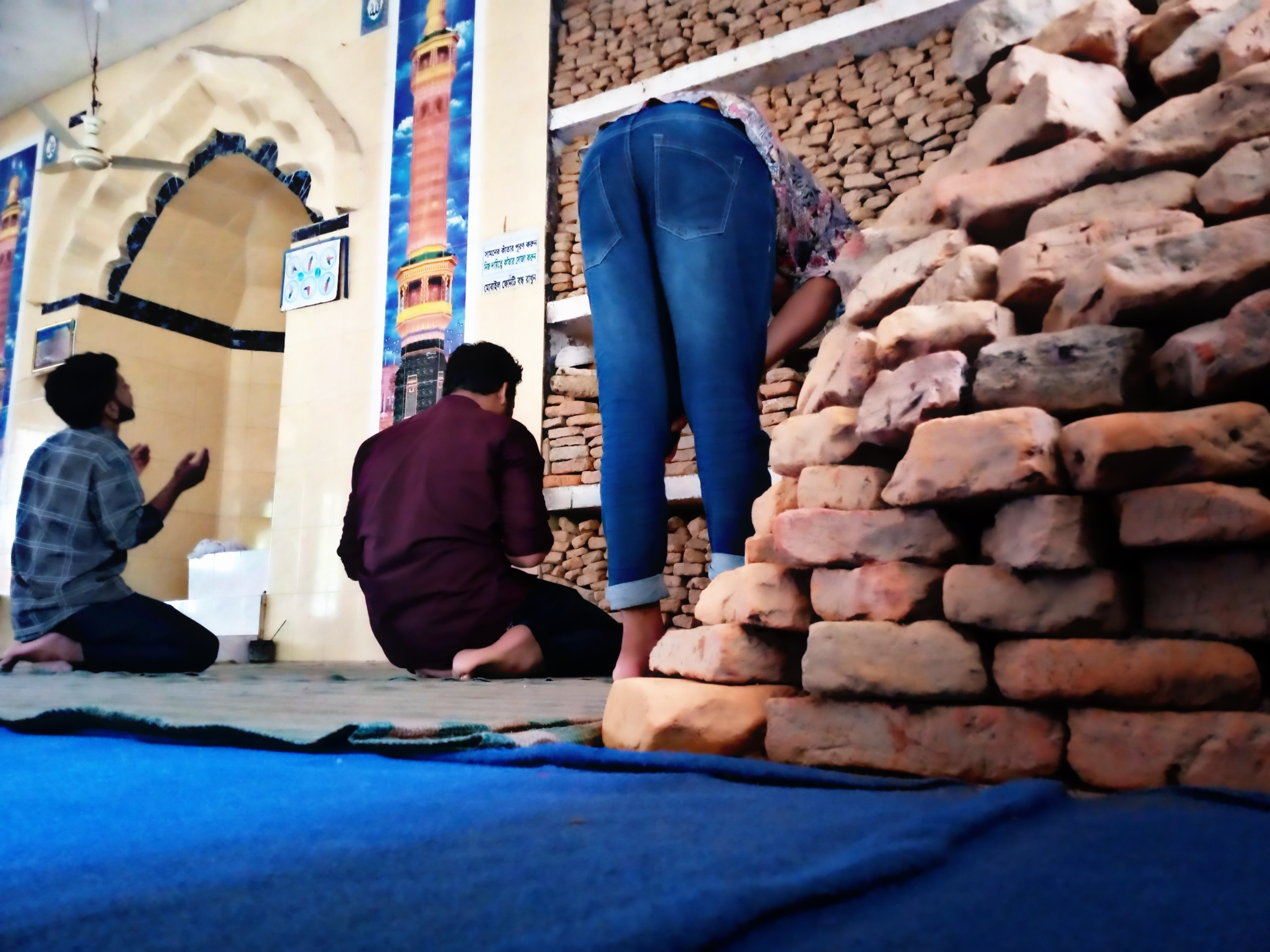
The prayer room and ruins, in 2021

== See also ==
- Islam in Bangladesh
- List of mosques in Bangladesh
- List of the oldest mosques
